= EGSA Alger =

State-run airline in Algeria

EGSA Alger or EGSA/Alger (Arabic: مؤسسة تسيير مصالح مطارات الجزائر, French: Etablissement de Gestion de Services Aéroportuaires d'Alger, which translates into English as: Airport Management Services Establishment of Algeria) is a government agency which operates 18 airports in Algeria.

EGSA Alger was created by presidential decree No. 173–87 on 11 August 1987. Under the supervision of the Algerian Ministry of Transportation, its mission is to manage, develop and operate Algerian airports open to public air traffic. It operates the following airports:

1. Algiers – Houari Boumediene Airport
2. Béjaïa – Abane Ramdane Airport
3. Hassi Messaoud – Oued Irara Airport
4. Ghardaïa – Noumerate Moufdi Zakaria Airport
5. Tamanrasset – Aguenar – Hadj Bey Akhamok Airport
6. Ouargla – Ain Beida Airport
7. In Amenas – Zarzaitine Airport
8. In Guezzam – In Guezzam Airport
9. In Salah – Tafsaout Airport
10. Laghouat – Moulay Ahmed Medeghri Airport
11. Hassi R'Mel – Tilrhemt Airport
12. El Oued – Guemar Airport
13. Djanet – Tiska Airport
14. Touggourt – Sidi Mahdi Airport
15. El Goléa – El Menia Airport
16. Bou Saâda – Ain Eddis Airport
17. Chlef – Abou Bakr Belkaid Airport
18. Illizi – Takhamalt Airport

== See also ==
- List of airports in Algeria
