= Mohamed Boudiaf International Airport =

Mohamed Boudiaf International Airport مطار قسنطينة - محمد بوضياف
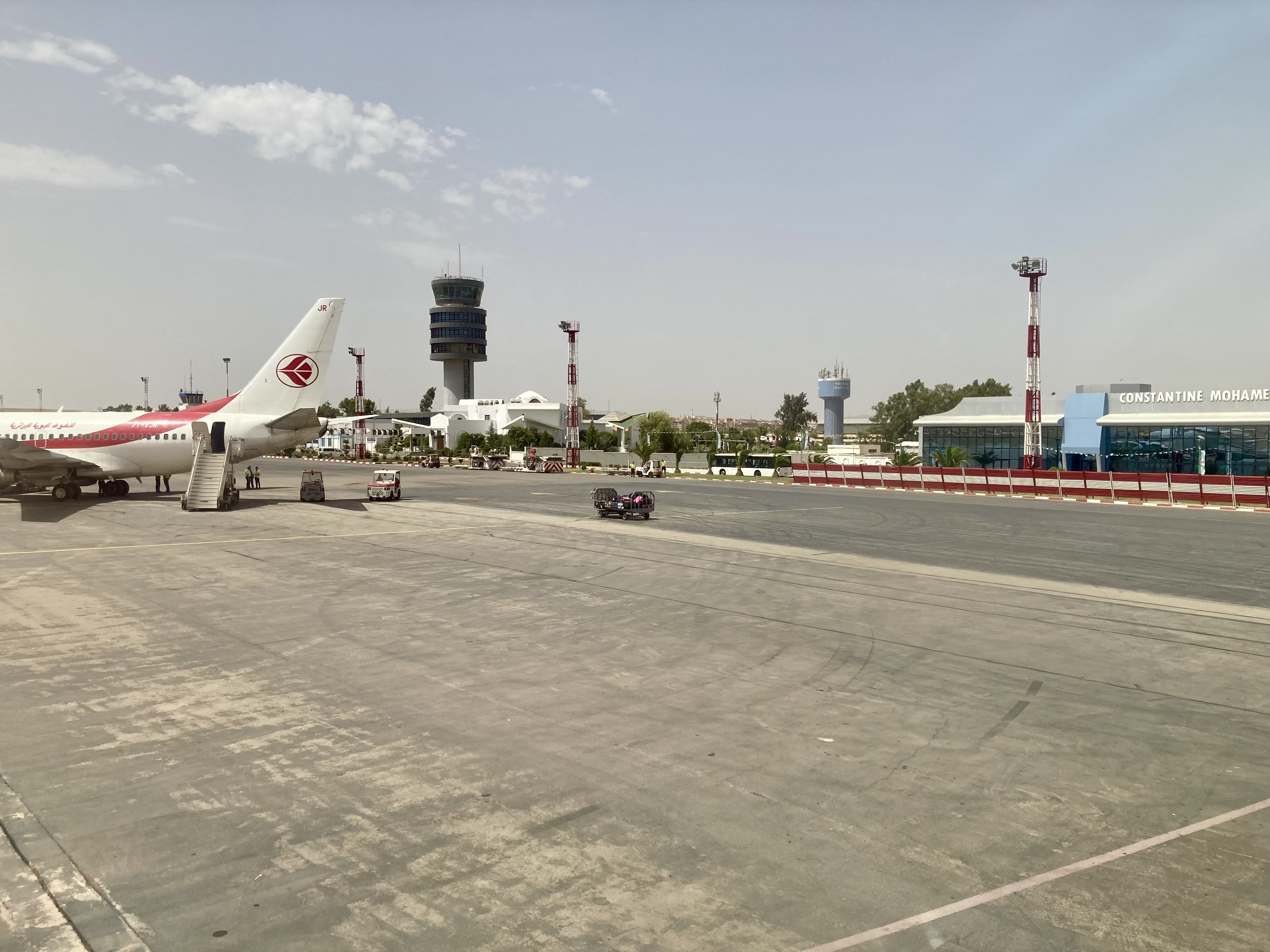
- IATA: CZL; ICAO: DABC

Summary
- Airport type: Public
- Operator: EGSA-Constantine
- Serves: Constantine
- Location: Constantine, Algeria
- Elevation AMSL: 2,316 ft (706 m)
- Coordinates: 36°17′0″N 06°37′0″E

Map
- Location of airport in Algeria

Runways
Direction	Length		Surface
Direction	m	ft	Surface
14/32	2,400	7,874	Asphalt
16/34	3,000	9,843	Asphalt

Statistics (2020)
- Passenger volume: 236,848
- Source: GCM SkyVector

Mohamed Boudiaf International Airport (Arabic: مطار قسنطينة - محمد بوضياف, French: Aéroport de Constantine - Mohamed Boudiaf IATA: CZL, ICAO: DABC) is an airport in Algeria, located approximately 9 kilometres (5.6 mi) south of Constantine; about 320 kilometres (200 mi) east-southeast of Algiers.

== History ==
The airport was built in 1943 as Constantine Airfield by the United States Army during the World War II North African Campaign. It was primarily a maintenance and supply depot for Air Technical Service Command and also served as headquarters for XII Bomber Command as a command and control base. It also was used as a command post for Allied Forces Command (AFHQ) for Free French, British and United States ground forces in Algeria in February 1943, under the command of General Sir Harold R. L. G. Alexander to coordinate the actions of the United States First Army advancing from the west and the British Eighth Army, advancing from the east against the German Afrika Korps. In 1944 it was turned over to the Algerian government and used occasionally by Air Transport Command aircraft on the North African route until the end of the war.

The airport is named for President Mohamed Boudiaf. Muhammad Boudiaf (June 23, 1919 – June 29, 1992) (Arabic: محمد بوضياف), also called Si Tayeb el Watani, was an Algerian political leader and a founder of the revolutionary National Liberation Front (FLN) that led the Algerian War of Independence (1954–1962).

== Airlines and destinations ==
The following airlines operate regular scheduled and charter flights at Constantine Airport:

Airlines	Destinations
Air Algérie	Adrar, Algiers, Basel/Mulhouse, Béchar, Djanet, Ghardaia, Hassi Messaoud, Istanbul, Lille, Jeddah, Lyon, Marseille, Medina, Metz/Nancy, Nice, Oran, Ouargla, Paris–Charles de Gaulle, Paris–Orly, Tamanrasset, Tindouf; Seasonal: Monastir, Toulouse; Seasonal charter: Sharm El Sheikh
ASL Airlines France	Seasonal: Basel/Mulhouse
Domestic Airlines	Algiers, Hassi Messaoud
Flynas	Jeddah, Medina
Transavia	Lyon, Paris–Orly; Seasonal: Montpellier, Nantes, Strasbourg
Saudia	Jeddah, Medina
Turkish Airlines	Istanbul
Volotea	Marseille

== See also ==
- Transport in Algeria
- List of airports in Algeria
