= Domestic Airlines =

Algerian airline

IATA	ICAO	Call sign
SF	DTH	TASSILI AIR
- Founded: 4 March 1998 (as Tassili Airlines); 3 July 2025 (as Domestic Airlines)
- Commenced operations: 8 April 1999 (as Tassili Airlines); 22 August 2025 (as Domestic Airlines)
- Operating bases: Houari Boumedienne Airport
- Fleet size: 15
- Destinations: 20
- Parent company: Air Algérie
- Headquarters: Algiers, Algeria
- Key people: Sidahmed Tazka (Interim Managing Director)
- Website: domesticairlines.dz

Domestic Airlines (Arabic: الخطوط الجوية الداخلية) formerly Tassili Airlines (Arabic: طيران الطاسيلي), is an Algerian passenger airline based in Algiers. Following a strategic restructuring in 2025, it operates as a wholly owned subsidiary of Air Algérie, the flag carrier of Algeria.

Originally founded in 1998 to serve the Algerian oil industry, operating charter and shuttle services domestically and internationally. The airline eventually transitioned to a scheduled carrier. Following its acquisition by Air Algérie in June 2025, it was rebranded as Domestic Airlines to serve as the group's regional and domestic specialist arm.

== History ==
Domestic Airlines was established on 4 March 1998, as a joint venture between Air Algérie (49%) and the state oil company Sonatrach (51%). Commercial services were launched on 8 April 1999, with a flight from Hassi Messaoud to Algiers. In April 2005, Air Algérie sold 25% of its shares in the airline, Sonatrach thus becoming the majority shareholder.

Domestic Airlines became a member of AFRAA in 2014, while continuing to expand its regional and international route network.

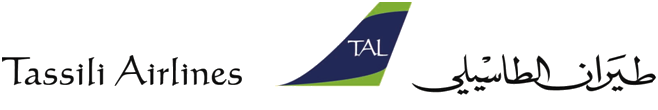
Domestic Airlines former logo.

On 19 June 2025, the Algerian government facilitated a transfer of ownership, moving 100% of the airline's shares to Air Algérie from Sonatrach Holdings. The move was intended to streamline the national aviation sector. Prior to its restructuring and acquisition by Air Algérie, Domestic Airlines operated a diverse portfolio that included specialized aerial work, medical evacuation, and agricultural services through its wholly owned subsidiary, Tassili Travail Aérien (TTA).

On 3 July 2025, Air Algérie unveiled the new visual identity of the airline, along with announcing that it would be renamed Domestic Airlines. Its primary focus would be shifting to domestic commercial routes to alleviate pressure on the mainline Air Algérie fleet. Domestic Airlines conducted its inaugural flight on 22 August 2025, followed by the full commencement of scheduled commercial services on 25 August 2025.

== Corporate affairs ==
=== Ownership ===
Prior to 19 June 2025, Sonatrach held a 76% stake in the airline and the remaining 24% was held by Air Algérie.

Since August 2025, Domestic Airlines has functioned as the regional division of Air Algérie. While it maintains its own air operator's certificate (AOC), its corporate strategy is fully integrated with the parent company's network.

=== Business trends ===
The annual accounts of the state-owned Domestic Airlines do not seem to have been published. A few recently available figures (largely from AFRAA reports) are shown below (for years ending 31 December):

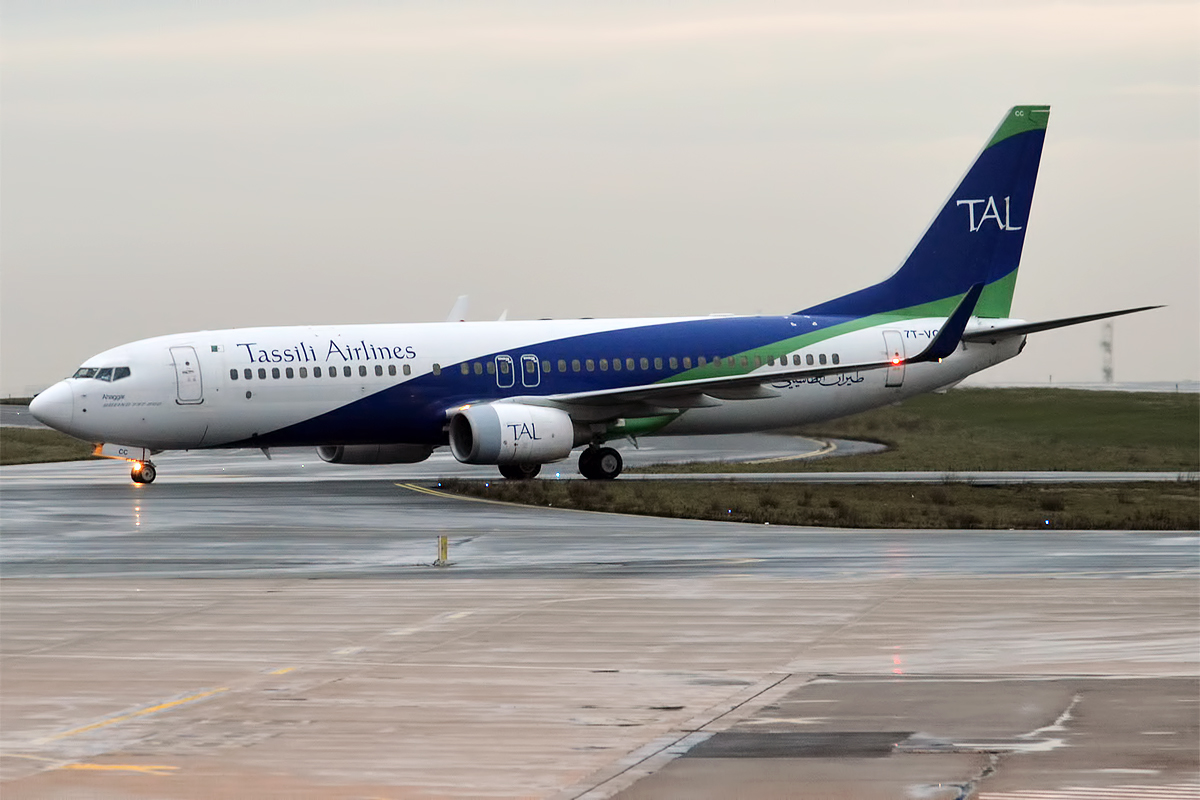
A Domestic Airlines Boeing 737-800, pictured in 2018.

	2016	2017	2018	2019	2020
Turnover					
Net profit					loss
Number of employees (at year end)	1,338	1,403	1,477		
Number of passengers (m)	0.2	0.8	1.8		
Passenger load factor (%)			58		
Number of aircraft (at year end)	12	12	15	15	15
Notes/sources					(Note: 2020: Activities and income in 2020 were severely reduced by the impact of the coronavirus pandemic)

== Destinations ==
As of January 2026, Domestic Airlines offers scheduled flights to the following destinations:

Algeria

- Adrar - Touat-Cheikh Sidi Mohamed Belkebir Airport
- Algiers - Houari Boumedienne Airport (base)
- Annaba - Rabah Bitat Airport
- Béchar - Boudghene Ben Ali Lotfi Airport
- Bordj Badji Mokhtar - Bordj Badji Mokhtar Airport
- Constantine - Mohamed Boudiaf International Airport
- Djanet - Djanet Inedbirene Airport
- El Golea - El Golea Airport
- El Oued - Guemar Airport
- Hassi Messaoud - Oued Irara–Krim Belkacem Airport
- Illizi - Takhamalt Airport
- In Amenas - In Amenas Airport
- In Salah - In Salah Airport
- Oran - Ahmed Ben Bella Airport
- Ouargla - Ain Beida Airport
- Tamanrasset - Tamanrasset Airport
- Tiaret - Abdelhafid Boussouf Bou Chekif Airport
- Touggourt - Sidi Mahdi Airport
- Timimoun - Timimoun Airport
- Tindouf - Tindouf Airport

== Fleet ==
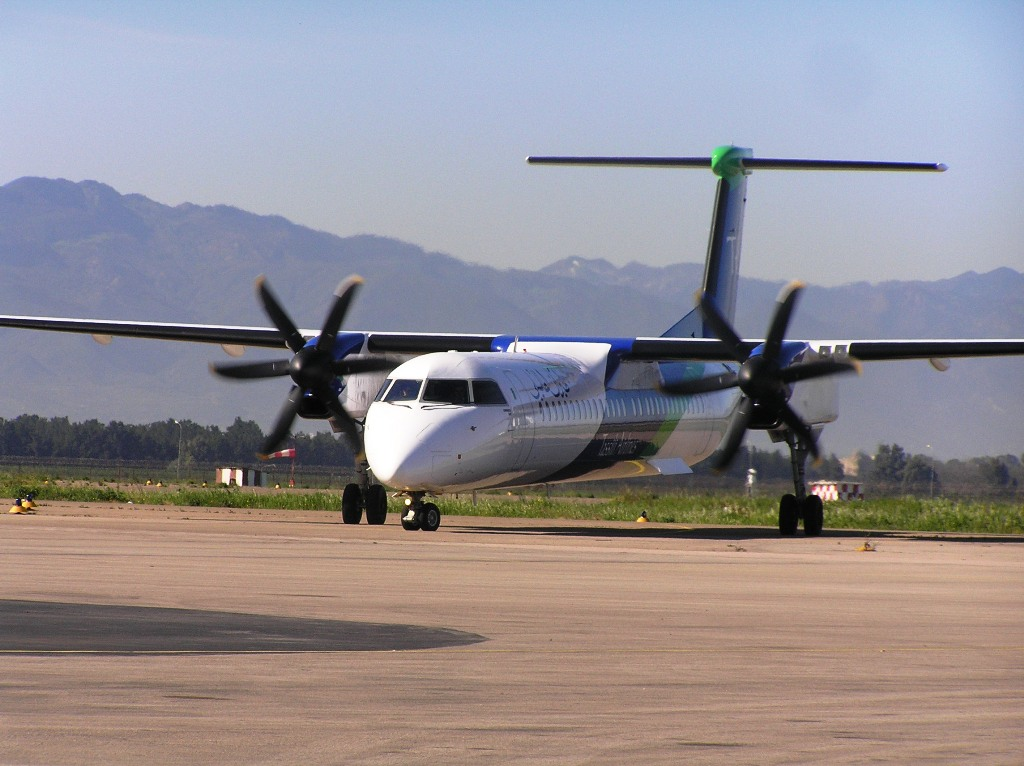
A Domestic Airlines Bombardier Dash 8 Q400 in Algiers.

As of August 2025, Domestic Airlines operates the following aircraft:

Domestic Airlines fleet
Aircraft	In service	Orders	Passengers	Notes
Boeing 737-800	7	—	155	
Bombardier Dash 8-Q200	4	—	37	
Bombardier Dash 8-Q400	4	—	74	
Total	15	—		

== Accidents and incidents ==
- On 28 January 2004, at around 21:00 local time, a Domestic Airlines Beechcraft 1900 (registered 7T-VIN) crashed 10 kilometres short of Ghardaïa Airport where it had been scheduled to land completing a chartered flight from Hassi R'Mel Airport. The pilot Mebarki Mohamed had to abort the landing approach because a preceding aircraft had not cleared the runway in time. During maneuvering for reaching the approach path again, the aircraft hit the ground with its right wing, which was subsequently torn off. Of the two passengers and three crew members on board, all but the co-pilot survived the crash.

== See also ==
- List of airlines of Algeria
- Transport in Algeria
