= Abane Ramdane Airport =

Soummam – Abane Ramdane Airport مطار بجاية – صومام – عبان رمضان (Arabic)
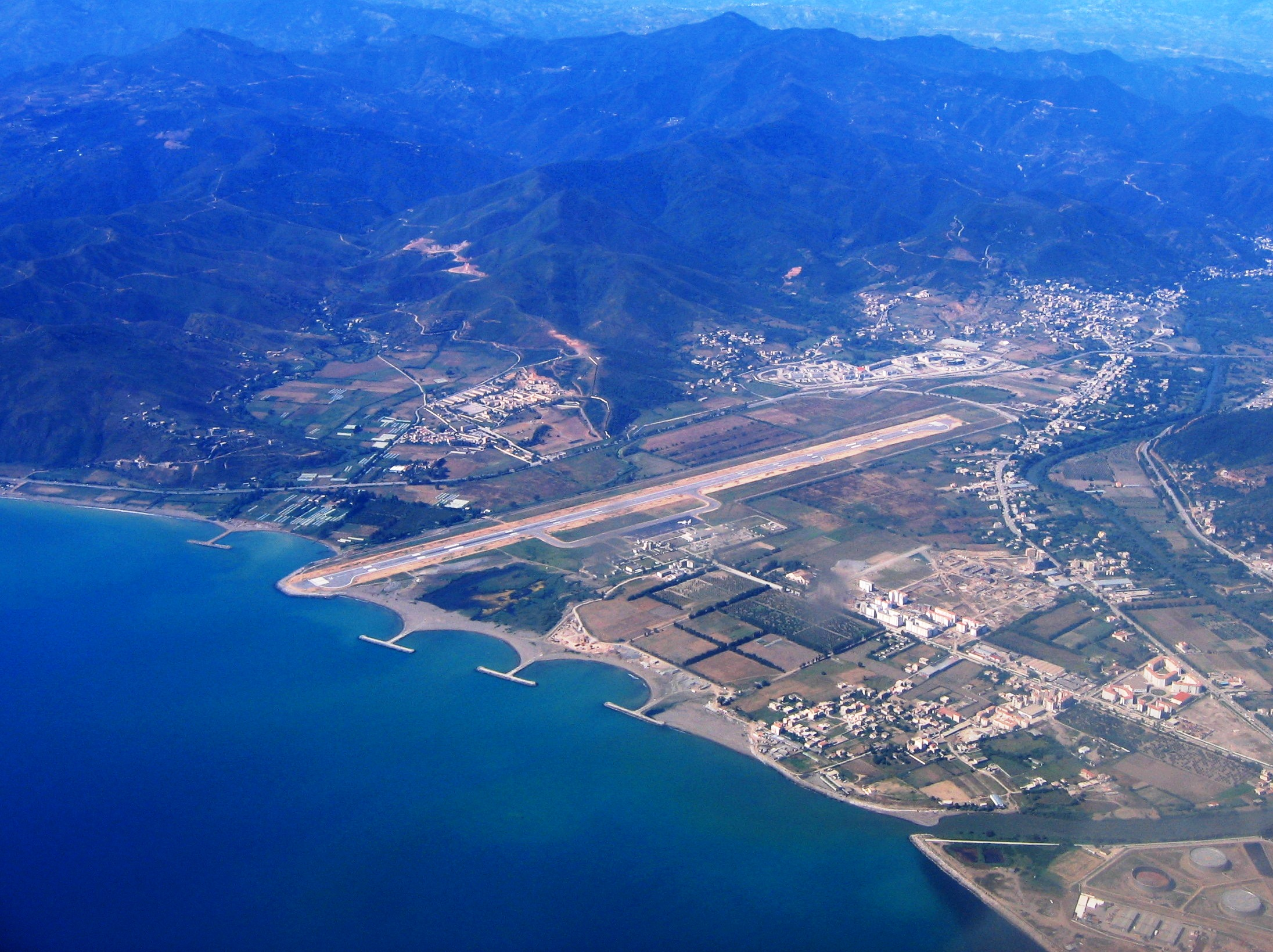
- IATA: BJA; ICAO: DAAE

Summary
- Airport type: Public
- Operator: EGSA Alger
- Serves: Bejaia
- Location: Bejaia, Algeria
- Opened: 1958
- Built: 1958
- Elevation AMSL: 6 m / 90 ft
- Coordinates: 36°42′43.1″N 5°4′10.1″E
- Website: aeroport-bja@egsa-alger.dz

Map
- Location of airport in Algeria

Runways
Direction	Length		Surface
Direction	m	ft	Surface
08/26	2,400	7,874	Asphalt

Statistics (2013)
- Passengers: 294,933
- Passenger change 12–13: ▲20.3%
- Aircraft movements: 3,664
- Movements change 12–13: ▲22.5%
- Sources: AIP, EGSA Alger, DAFIF Landings.com, ACI's 2013 World Airport Traffic Report.

Soummam – Abane Ramdane Airport (French: Aéroport de Bejaia / Soummam – Abane Ramdane) (IATA: BJA, ICAO: DAAE), also known as Soummam Airport or Bejaia Airport, is an airport serving Bejaia, a city in the Bejaia Province of northern Algeria. It is located 5 kilometres (3.1 mi) south of the city, It was opened in 1982 to national level and its quick development led to its opening in international traffic in 1993. The airport is named after Abane Ramdane (1920–1957) (since 1999 by presidential decree), an Algerian revolutionary and architect of the 1956 Congress of Soummam.

In 2008, the airport handled 52,681 passengers on domestic flights and 170,724 passengers on international flights. The airport offers more than 10 flights per week to Paris, France and some others to Lyon, France, and Marseille, France. There are daily domestic flights, mainly to Algiers.

== Airlines and destinations ==
The following airlines operate regular scheduled and charter flights at Bejaia Airport:

Airlines	Destinations
Air Algérie	Algiers, Lyon, Marseille, Paris–Orly, Paris–Charles de Gaulle
ASL Airlines France	Paris–Charles de Gaulle; Seasonal: Lille, Saint-Étienne
Tassili Airlines	Hassi Messaoud
Transavia	Lyon, Paris–Orly
TUI fly Belgium	Brussels, Lille
Volotea	Seasonal: Marseille

== Statistics ==
Traffic by calendar year. Official ACI Statistics
	Passengers	Change from previous year	Aircraft operations	Change from previous year	Cargo (metric tons)	Change from previous year
2005	205,298	▲3.51%	2,967	▲2.70%	139	▼25.67%
2006	162,441	▼20.88%	2,446	▼17.56%	106	▼23.74%
2007	75,250	▼53.68%	964	▼60.59%	24	▼77.36%
2008	202,120	▲168.60%	2,794	▲189.83%	129	▲437.50%
2009	216,847	▲7.29%	3,103	▲11.06%	114	▼11.63%
2010	213,490	▼1.55%	3,134	▲1.00%	111	▼2.63%
2011	221,175	▲3.60%	2,954	▼5.74%	111	0.00%
2012	245,254	▲10.89%	2,991	▲1.25%	134	▲20.72%
2013	294,933	▲20.26%	3,664	▲22.50%	N.A.	N.A
Source: Airports Council International. World Airport Traffic Reports (Years 2005, 2006, 2007, 2009, 2011, 2012, and 2013)
