= INF =

Inf or INF may refer to:

== Computing ==
- INF file, a file extension (information file) used by software and hardware driver installation routines
- INF help file, a binary help file created after compiling IPF help source with IBM or Open Watcom's help compiler.
- Informatics (academic field), the science of information and the practice of information processing

== Mathematics ==
- Infinity, referring to something without any limit
- Infimum, the greatest lower bound of a subset of a partially ordered set

== Politics ==
- Intermediate-Range Nuclear Forces Treaty, a 1987 arms control treaty between the United States and the Soviet Union
- International Naturist Federation, the global umbrella organisation representing official national naturist societies
- International Netball Federation, the international governing body for the sport of netball
- Irish National Federation, a nationalist political party in Ireland 1891–1900

== Places ==
- In Guezzam Airport, Algeria
- INF Clairefontaine, France national football team centre

== Biology ==
- Inferior; see Anatomical terms of location § Superior and inferior
- Inflammation, part of the immune response to tissue damage or infection

== Military ==
- Infantry, land based soldiers who are specifically trained for the role of fighting on foot

== People ==
- Issey Nakajima-Farran, Canadian soccer player
