= Air Algérie Flight 2208 =

2006 aviation accident

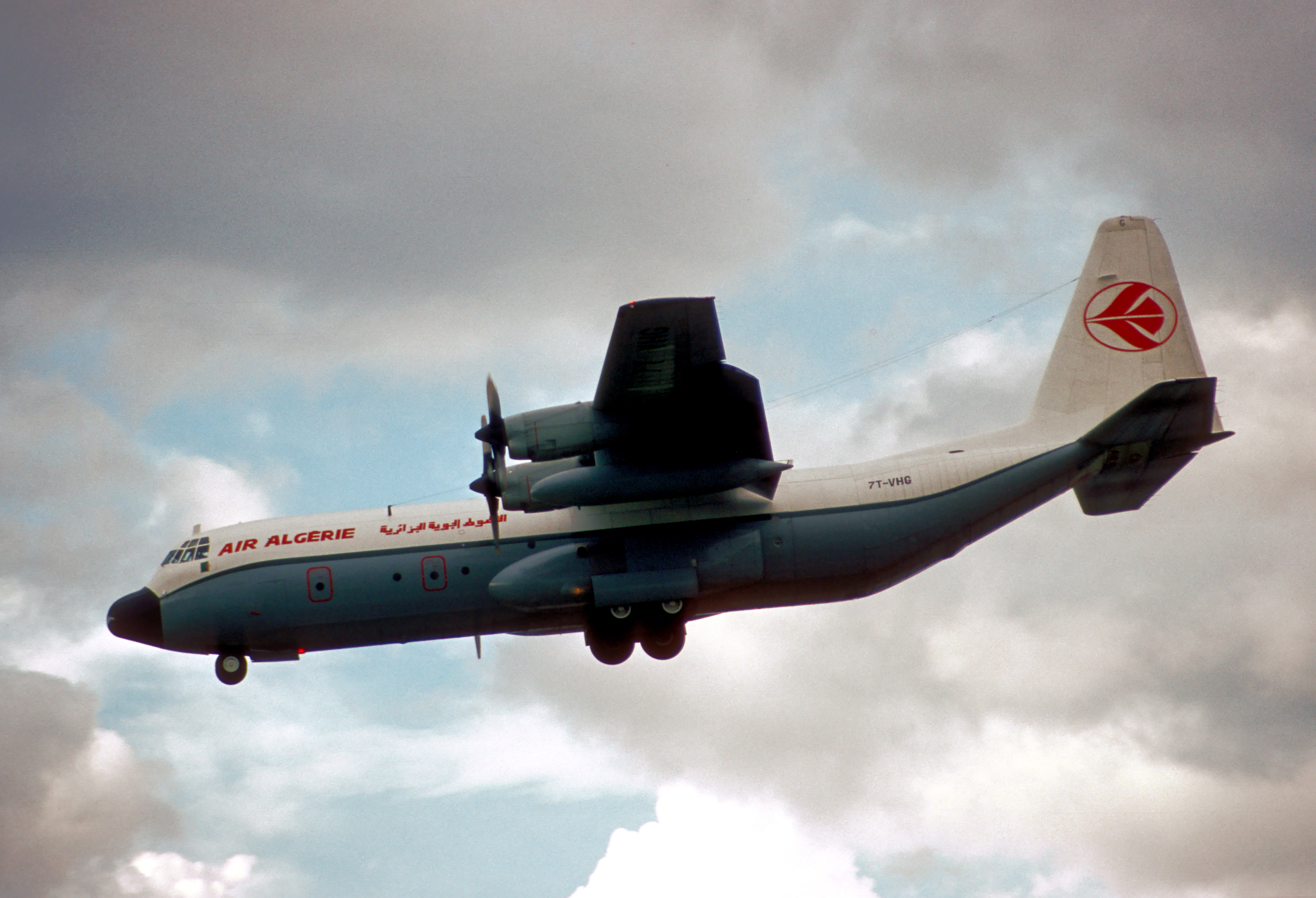
- 7T-VHG, the aircraft involved in the accident

Accident
- Date: 13 August 2006
- Summary: Instrument failure leading to a loss of control
- Site: Piacenza, Italy; 45°02′16.1″N 9°39′21.9″E

Aircraft
- Aircraft type: Lockheed L-100-30 Hercules
- Operator: Air Algérie
- IATA flight No.: AH2208
- ICAO flight No.: DAH2208
- Call sign: AIR ALGERIE 2208
- Registration: 7T-VHG
- Flight origin: Houari Boumediene Airport
- Destination: Frankfurt Airport
- Occupants: 3
- Crew: 3
- Fatalities: 3
- Survivors: 0

Air Algérie Flight 2208 was a cargo flight between Algiers-Houari Boumediene Airport, Algiers, Algeria, and Frankfurt Airport, Germany. On 13 August 2006, the Lockheed L-100 operating the flight crashed in Northern Italy as a result of an autopilot malfunction. The aircraft struck the ground in a sparsely populated area after a very steep and rapid descent, narrowly avoiding crashing into a highly populated area. The crew of three on board were killed in the accident; there were no passengers, nor were there injuries or property damage on the ground.

== Crew ==
The three Algerian crew members were 43-year-old Captain Mohamed Abdou, who had more than 8,200 hours of flight experience after being promoted to Captain in April 2005; 58-year-old First Officer Mohamed Tayeb Bederina, who had the most experience with more than 22,800 hours of flight time; and 51-year-old Flight Engineer Mustafa Kadid, who had more than 14,600 hours of flight time.

== Accident ==
The 25-year-old aircraft, a Lockheed L-100-30 Hercules, registration 7T-VHG, was operating a cargo service between Algiers-Houari Boumediene Airport and Frankfurt Airport as Flight 2208; it was flying over Italian soil at 24,000 feet (7,300 m) when it began descending for unknown reasons. The pilot had informed that there was an engine loss of power prior to losing contact with the Milan air traffic control while the aircraft was flying at 13,500 feet (4,100 m).

The pilot was able to direct the aircraft's descent towards a sparsely populated area. It struck the ground between Milan and Parma in a village named Besurica, located in the outskirts of Piacenza. Upon impacting, the airframe broke in two. According to the Corriere della Sera, the impact was so devastating that the wreckage of the aircraft was strewn over several kilometres, while the loud noise of the crash was heard in the city proper. The impact created a crater 50 metres (160 ft) long and 15 metres (49 ft) wide. The upper portion of the rudder and parts of the elevator were found 1,200 metres (3,900 ft) and 3,000 metres (9,800 ft) ahead of the impact point, respectively.

The aircraft narrowly avoided crashing into highly populated areas, to the extent that the mayor of Piacenza referred to the occurrence as a miracle. There were neither injuries nor property damage on the ground, but the crew of three on board lost their lives in the accident.

== Investigation ==
The National Agency for the Safety of Flight (ANSV) started an inquiry, following the recovery of the cockpit voice recorder a week after the crash. The flight data recorder was also recovered, and results from its decoded ribbon showed that the aircraft was flying at cruising altitude with the autopilot engaged, that it got disengaged twelve seconds after the autopilot failure light lit, and that both directional and longitudinal control was lost moments later, with the aircraft crashing 73 seconds after the light came on. The angle and the speed of the impact were estimated to be between 45° and 50° and in the range of 460 to 485 knots (852 to 898 km/h; 529 to 558 mph), respectively.

== Aftermath ==
Given that the aircraft flight data recorder (FDR) was a first generation one manufactured in the 1960s, it was not in compliance with ICAO regulations. (Note: More specifically, ICAO Annex 6 requirements were not met.) The ANSV urged the Algerian Civil Aviation Authority to replace older FDRs with newest ones.

== See also ==
- Air Algérie Flight 6289
