= Hassi R'Mel Airport =

Airport in Algeria

Hassi R'Mel Airport Aéroport de Hassi R'Mel: Tilrhemt
- IATA: HRM; ICAO: DAFH

Summary
- Airport type: Public
- Operator: EGSA Alger
- Serves: Hassi R'Mel, Algeria
- Elevation AMSL: 774 m / 2,540 ft
- Coordinates: 32°55′53.3″N 3°18′37.4″E

Map
- Location of airport in Algeria

Runways
| Direction | Length | | Surface |
| Direction | m | ft | Surface |
|---|---|---|---|
| 08/26 | 2,998 | 9,836 |
- Services Aéroportuaires d’Alger (EGSA Alger) DAFIF Landings.com Google Maps

Hassi R'Mel Airport (French: Aéroport de Hassi R'Mel: Tilrhemt) (IATA: HRM, ICAO: DAFH), also known as Tilrhemt Airport or Tilrempt Airport is an airport serving Hassi R'Mel, a town in the Laghouat Province of Algeria. It is 1.6 kilometres (1 mi) from Hassi R'Mel.

== Airlines and destinations ==
| Airlines | Destinations |
|---|---|
| Air Algerie | Algiers |
| Tassili Airlines | Algiers |
