= Air Algérie =

State-owned flag carrier of Algeria

- Air Algérie Boeing 737-800
IATA	ICAO	Call sign
AH	DAH	AIR ALGERIE
- Founded: 15 March 1947
- Hubs: Houari Boumediene Airport
- Focus cities: Oran Es Sénia Airport
- Frequent-flyer program: Air Algérie Plus
- Subsidiaries: Subsidiaries list: Air Algérie Cargo; Air Algérie Catering; Air Algérie Technics; Air Algérie Handling; Domestic Airlines; Tour Operator
- Fleet size: 56
- Destinations: 78
- Parent company: Government of Algeria
- Headquarters: Algiers, Algeria
- Key people: Hamza Benhamouda (CEO)
- Operating income: ▲102 billion Algerian dinar (DA)
- Employees: 7,945 (2022)
- Website: www.airalgerie.dz/en/

Air Algérie SpA (Arabic: الخطوط الجوية الجزائرية, al-Khuṭūṭu l-Jawwiyyatu l-Jazā’iriyyah) is the flag carrier of Algeria, with its head office in the El-Djazair office block in Algiers. With flights operating mostly from Houari Boumedienne Airport in Algiers and Ahmed Ben Bella Airport in Oran, Air Algérie operates scheduled services to 33 domestic destinations in Algeria and 42 international destinations in 28 countries across Europe, North America, Africa, Asia, and the Middle East. Air Algérie is 100% owned by the Government of Algeria.

== History ==
=== Formation and early years ===
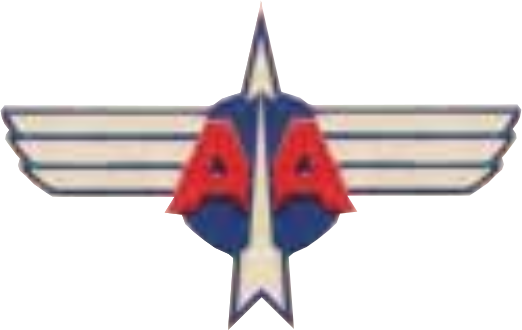
1946-1953

1953-1956

1956-1962

In 1946, Compagnie Générale de Transports Aériens (CGTA) was established. It started operating flights between Algeria and Europe on a charter basis in 1947. However, by the end of the decade, CGTA was operating scheduled flights serving Algiers, Basel, Bône, Geneva, Marseille, Paris, Philippeville, and Toulouse. In 1952, three 34-seater Bretagnes joined a fleet of seven DC-3s. Meanwhile, Compagnie Air Transport (CAT), a subsidiary of Air France and Compagnie Générale Transatlantique, had been formed in the late 1940s to connect Basel, Lyon, Marseille, Paris, and Toulouse with Algiers, Constantine, and Oran. Seasonal London–Deauville, and London–Le Touquet flights were also undertaken. Following a drop in traffic after 1951, a merging partner was under consideration.

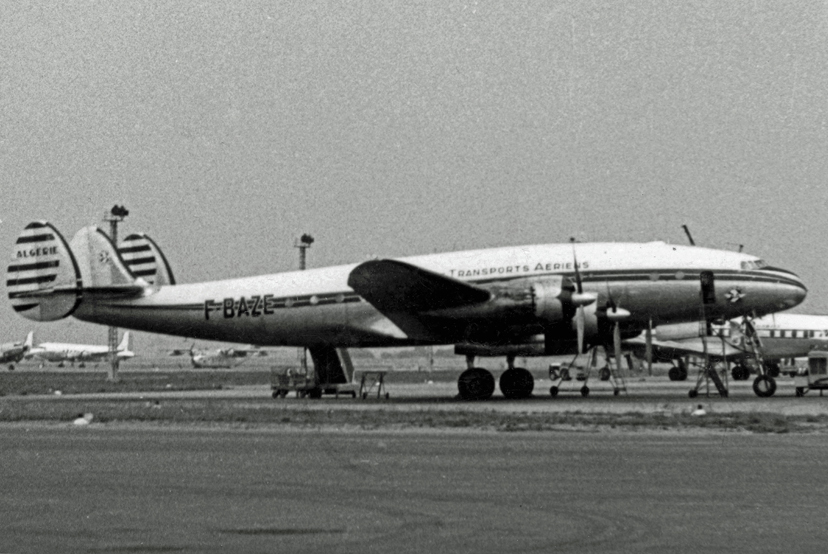
A France-registered Lockheed Constellation in Air Algérie markings at Paris Orly Airport in 1957

CGTA, and CAT merged on 23 May 1953 to form the Compagnie Générale de Transports Aériens Air Algérie, with a combined fleet that included one Breguet 761, six Bretagnes, five DC-3s, and three DC-4s. Following the merger, Air Algérie commenced seasonal services to Ajaccio, Clermont, Montpellier, and Perpignan. Furthermore, Switzerland was added to the regular schedule, a stop at Palma was performed on a weekly basis in partnership with Aviaco, and most of the trans-Mediterranean routes were operated in a pool agreement with Air France, with the French carrier flying 54% of these services, and the remainder was left for Air Algérie. Flights to the Cote d'Azur were added in the late 1950s.

Two Noratlas aircraft were acquired in July 1957, with a third entering the fleet in July the following year. In addition, it became the first private French carrier to order the Caravelle in early 1958, the first of which was handed over by the manufacturer in January 1960. Following delivery, the aircraft was deployed on the Algiers–Paris route. The type was also used to fly Paris–Bône and Paris–Oran services in the subsequent months. By April 1960, Air Algérie's fleet consisted of three Caravelles, three DC-3s, ten DC-4s, two Lockheed L-749 Constellations, and three Noratlases. The Caravelles were gradually deployed on the routes previously flown with the Constellations and the DC-4s, which were used for cargo services or sold.

=== Algerian independence ===
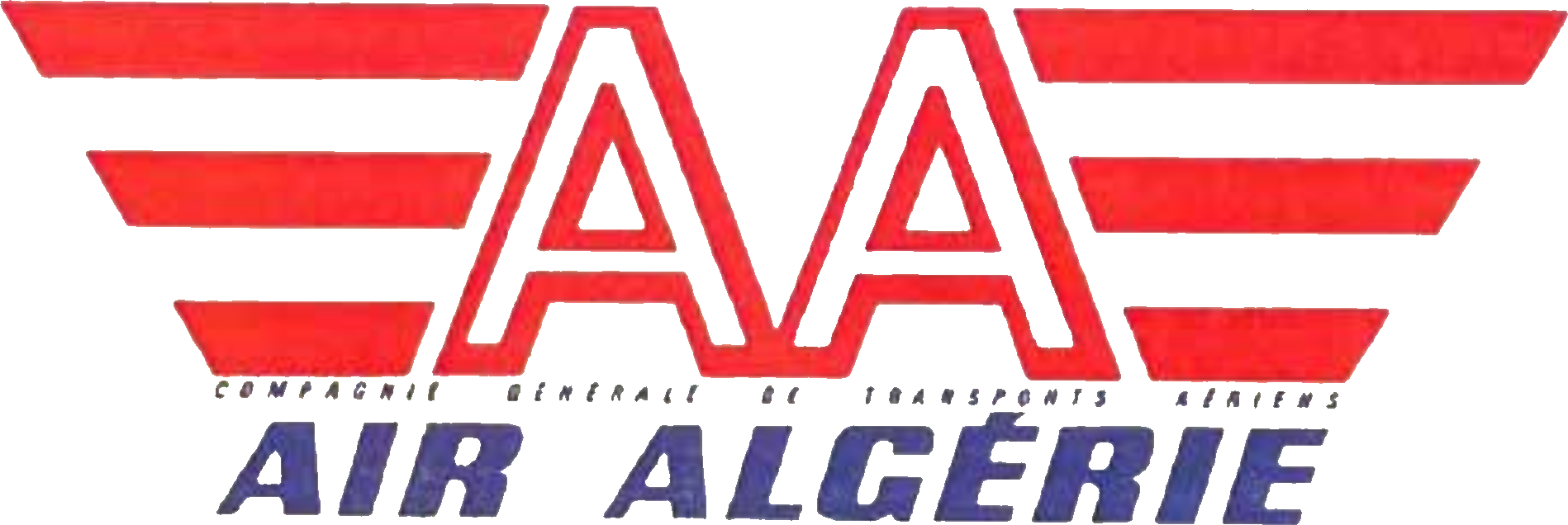
Logo 1962-1965

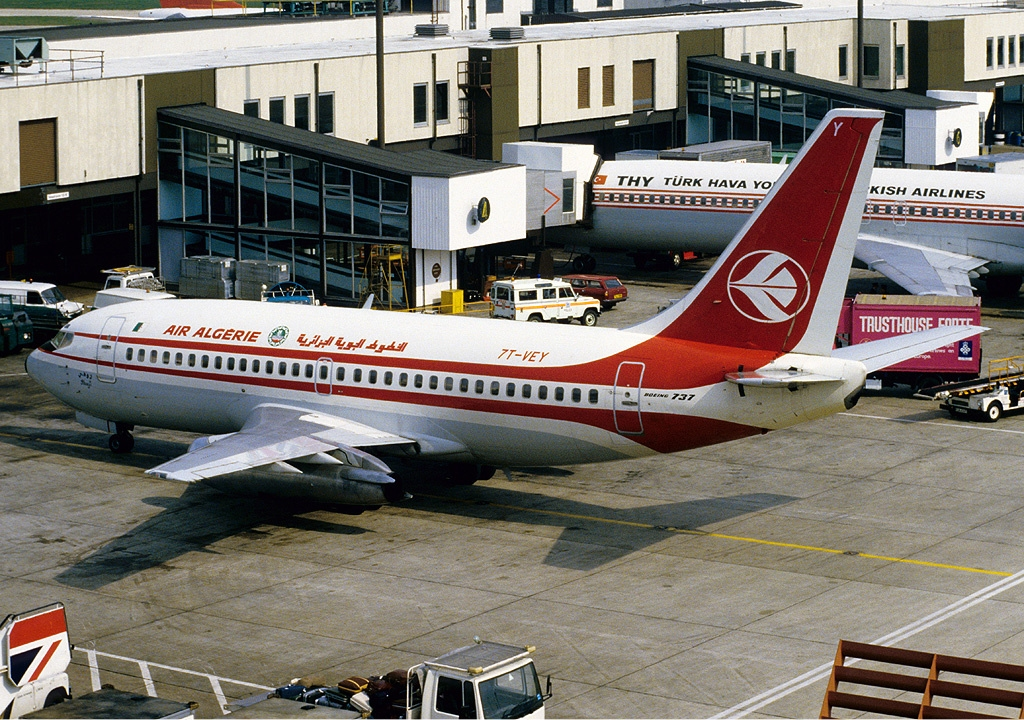
An Air Algérie Boeing 737-200 at London Heathrow Airport in April 1984

Two shipping companies, Compagnie Générale Transatlantique, and Compagnie de Navigation Mixte, were the owners of a majority stake (98%) in Air Algérie until Algeria gained its independence in 1962. Following independence, the Délégation Générale in Algeria and Air France took over a controlling interest. The financial structure changed in March 1963, when the shipping companies and Air France ceded a 31% interest, and the Algerian government took possession of 51% of the company assets, with the airline gaining flag carrier status. In April 1964, the government increased the participation in the airline to 57%. That month, a contract was signed for the acquisition of two Ilyushin Il-18s aimed at operating the Algiers–Moscow service. Air Algérie took delivery of just one of these aircraft, as the contract was later cancelled. The sole Il-18 in the fleet was used by the government. There were eight DC-4s in the airline's fleet by April 1968. That year, four ex-Lufthansa Convair 440s were bought and converted to the 640 version. These aircraft came to replace the ageing DC-4s. Charter operations made up to 20% of the airline activities.

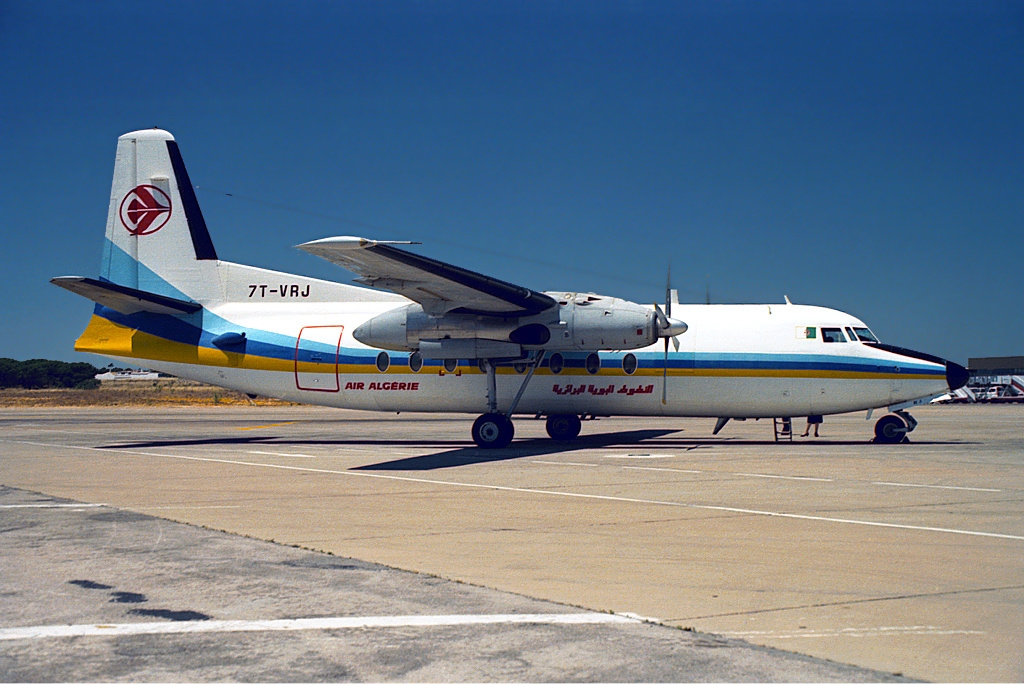
A Fokker F27 Friendship of Air Algérie at Faro Airport in 1991

By March 1970, the government was the owner of 83% of the company; at this time, a Boeing 737-200, five Caravelles, four CV-640s, three DC-3s and one DC-4 were part of the fleet. Société de Travail Aérien, a domestic carrier that had been founded in 1968, was taken over by Air Algérie in May 1972. In August, three Fokker F27-400s were ordered for £2.5 million. In September, with a second Boeing 737 pending delivery, two more aircraft of the type —one of them a convertible model— were ordered. That year, the government of Algeria boosted its participation in the carrier to 100% when it acquired the remaining 17.74% stake held by Air France. A new route to Karachi was inaugurated in 1975. In November 1979, four Boeing 727s were ordered in a deal worth US$62 million.

By July 1980, Air Algérie had 5,621 employees and a fleet comprising 57 aircraft, including 14 Ag-Cats, six Boeing 727-200s, ten Boeing 737-200s, three Boeing 737-200Cs, one Boeing 747-200C, one Cherokee Six, two Convair CV-640s, one Douglas DC-8-63CF, one Nord 262 and 18 Queen Airs; at this time, the company offered international scheduled services to Belgium, Bulgaria, Czechoslovakia, Egypt, France, Germany, Italy, Yugoslavia, Libya, Romania, Spain, the UK, the USSR and Switzerland, among other countries, as well as an extensive domestic network. In January 1981, the carrier ordered three Lockheed L-100-30s; (Note: The carrier had previously operated the type, on lease from Southern Air Transport.) by late June the same year, the first of these aircraft was due to be delivered. In November 1981, a Boeing 727-200 and a Boeing 737-200 were acquired. Three Boeing 737-200s were ordered for US$50 million in 1983. Air Algérie became Airbus' 48th customer when it placed an order for two Airbus A310s in 1984. That year, a subsidiary called Inter Air Services (IAS) (French: Lignes Intérieures Algériennes), an airline that flew domestic and regional services using Fokker F-27 aircraft, was formed. The IAS network was operated on Air Algéries's behalf, and at March 1985 included Adrar, Algiers, Bechar, Bordj B. Mokhtar, Djanet, El Golea, Ghardaia, Hassi Messaoud, Illizi, In Amenas, In Salah, Oran, Ouargla, Tamanrasset and Timimoun; by this time, Air Algérie had 6,788 employees. In 1989, the carrier ordered three Boeing 767-300s for US$264 million.

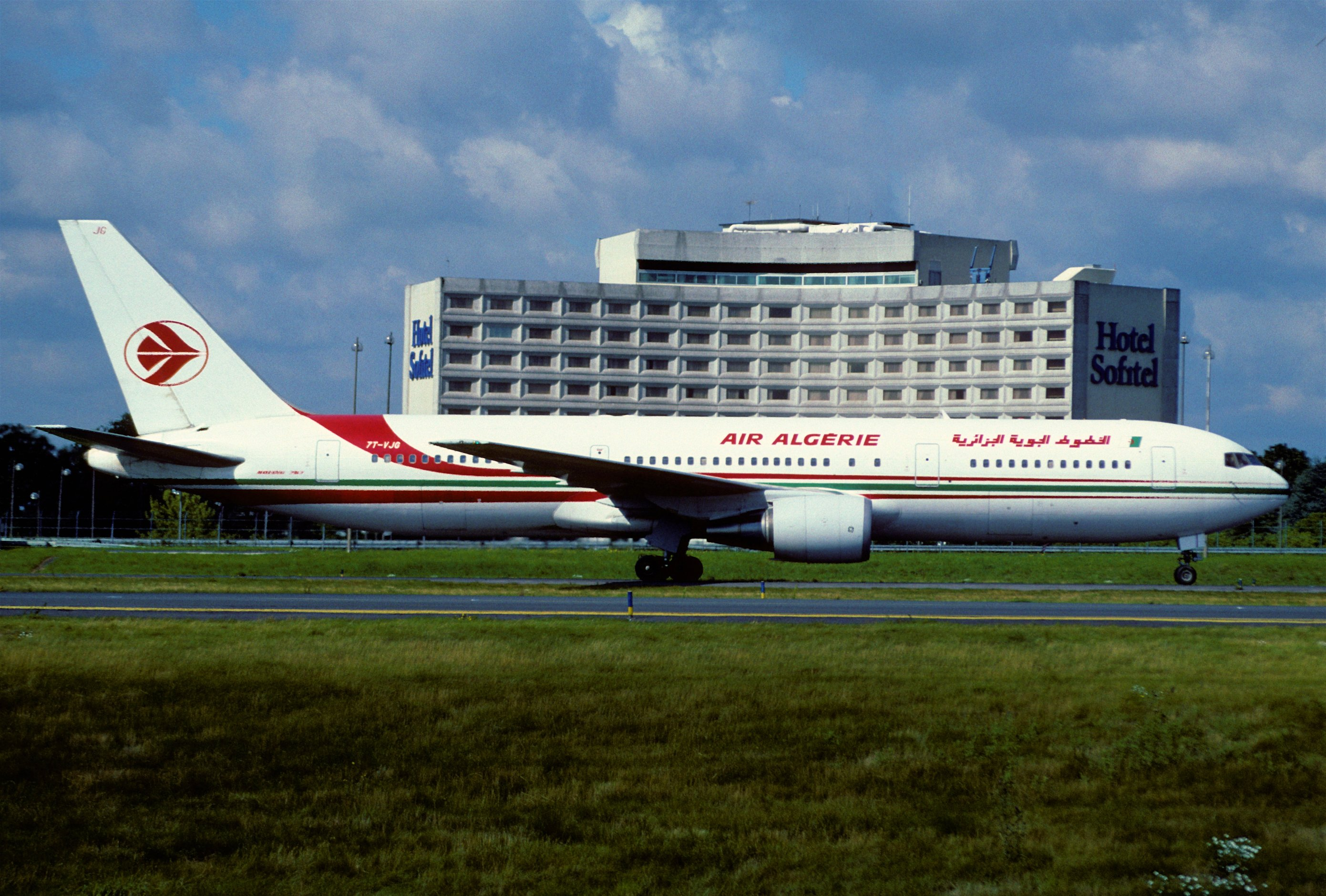
An Air Algérie Boeing 767-300 At Paris-Charles de Gaulle Airport in 2001. The airline received the first aircraft of the type in 1990.

The first Boeing 767-300 was handed over by the aircraft manufacturer in mid-1990. That year, the carrier entered a process of restructuring that would last until 1995, following years of losses that totalled US$64,000,000 (equivalent to $157,717,779 in 2025) only for 1990, with debts rising to US$402 million after a devaluation of the local currency. Restructuring seemingly bore fruit, as the company made a profit of US$14.5 million in 1992.

Air Algérie and Sonatrach created Tassili Airlines in 1998; Air Algérie's 49% shareholding in this airline was handed over to Sonatrach in 2005.

=== Modernization of the company ===
Air Algérie became a limited company in 1997. In 2006 its capital amounted to 57 billion dinars (about 560 million euros).

The sales network comprises 150 agencies in Algeria and abroad, linked to the booking system and distributed through GDS to which Air Algérie has subscribed. Air Algérie is a Joint Stock Company (J.S.C) the registered capital of which is 43.000.000.000,00 DA.

In November 2010, Air Algérie announced an investment of €400 million to renew its fleet, to be launched in 2011.

== Corporate affairs ==
=== Business trends ===
The airline is loss-making. Its full Annual Report does not seem to be published regularly; figures disclosed for Air Algérie for recent years are shown below (for years ending 31 December):

Year	Sales turnover (DA b)	Operating profit (DA b)	Net profit (DA b)	Number of employees	Number of passengers (scheduled) (m)	Passenger load factor (%)	Cargo carried (000 tonnes) (Note: the "(000)" in the AFRAA annual reports of 2021 and 2022 on the pages headlined "ANNEX 1: AFRAA member airlines performance" are not correct.)	Number of aircraft (at year end)	References
2007	49.4				2.9	57	14.7		
2008	54.3				3.2				
2009	58.1	2.2	4.0	8,898	3.5		13.5	39	
2010	55.6	2.9	2.3	9,502	3.5	60.5	13.4	39	
2011	57.0	2.9	2.6	9,750	3.7	63.6	11.7	43	
2012	65.6	2.7	2.8	9,563	4.3	66.4	11.3	43	
2013	69.6	−1.2	1.2	9,469	4.7	66.4	15.7	43	
2014	77.6	−0.2	1.4	9,095	5.2	63.2	14.9	44	
2015	80.6	−2.5	0.1	8,610	5.5	69.7	15.3	54	
2016	91.5	−1.6	−0.3	9,016	6.1	70	15.5	56	
2017	96.0	−9.3	−2.9	8,768	6.3	72	17.7	58	
2018	113.6	−5.5	−2.6	8,670	6.6	74	20.1	56	
2019					6.6	75.1	17.1	57	
2020								56 (Note: 28 in service)	
2021					1.9	73.1	11.5	56	
2022				7,945	4.6	78	17.9	58	

Air Algérie's first logo, used from 1966 to 2023.

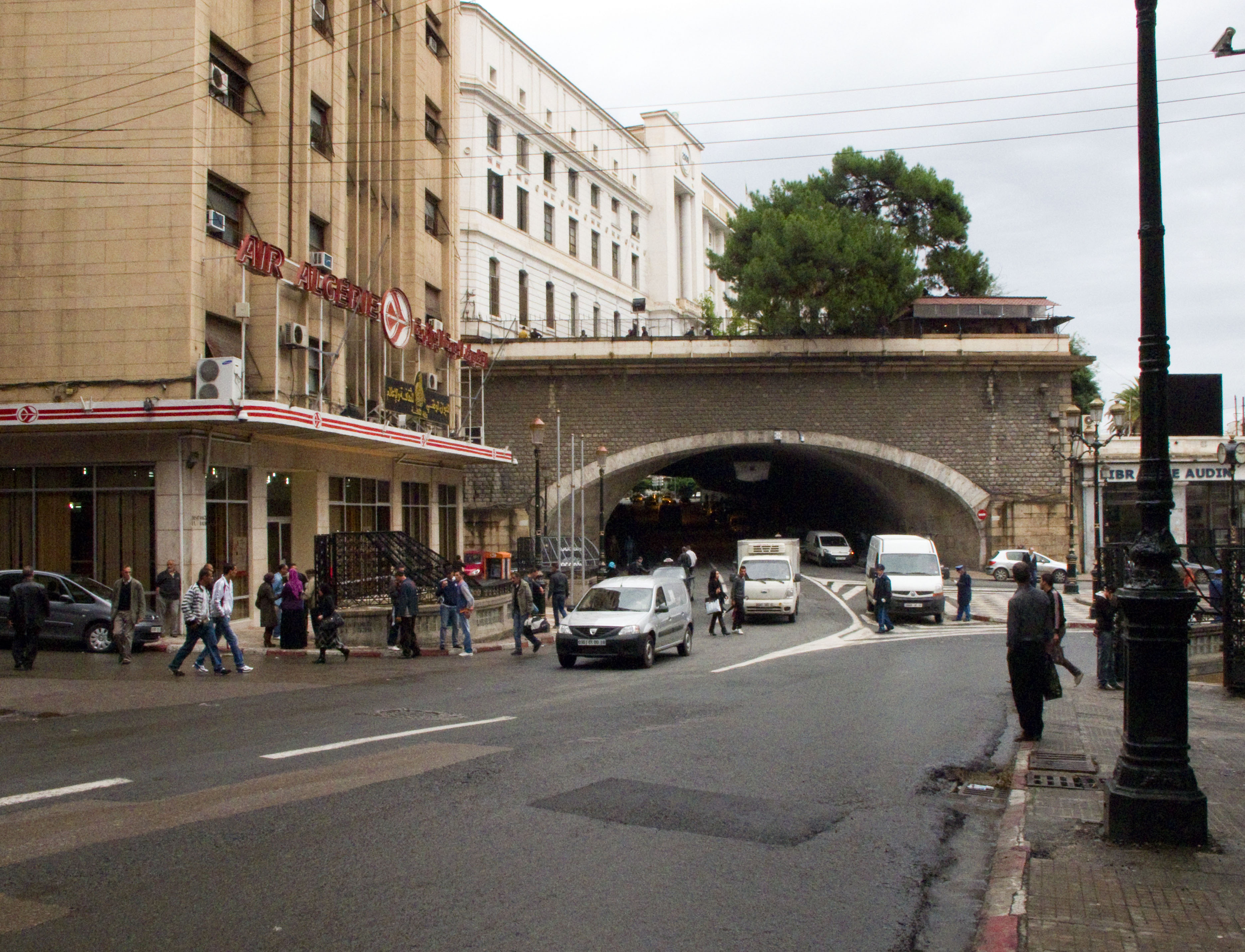
Air Algérie headquarters in Algiers

=== Ownership and subsidiaries ===
Air Algérie is a joint stock company, with the shares 100% owned by the Algerian state.

The airline has the following main subsidiaries:

- Technics Air Algérie
- Air Algérie Catering, with 2,000 employees, preparing the meals of all Air Algérie's flights departing from Algeria
- Air Algérie Cargo
- Air Algérie Handling
- Domestic Airlines

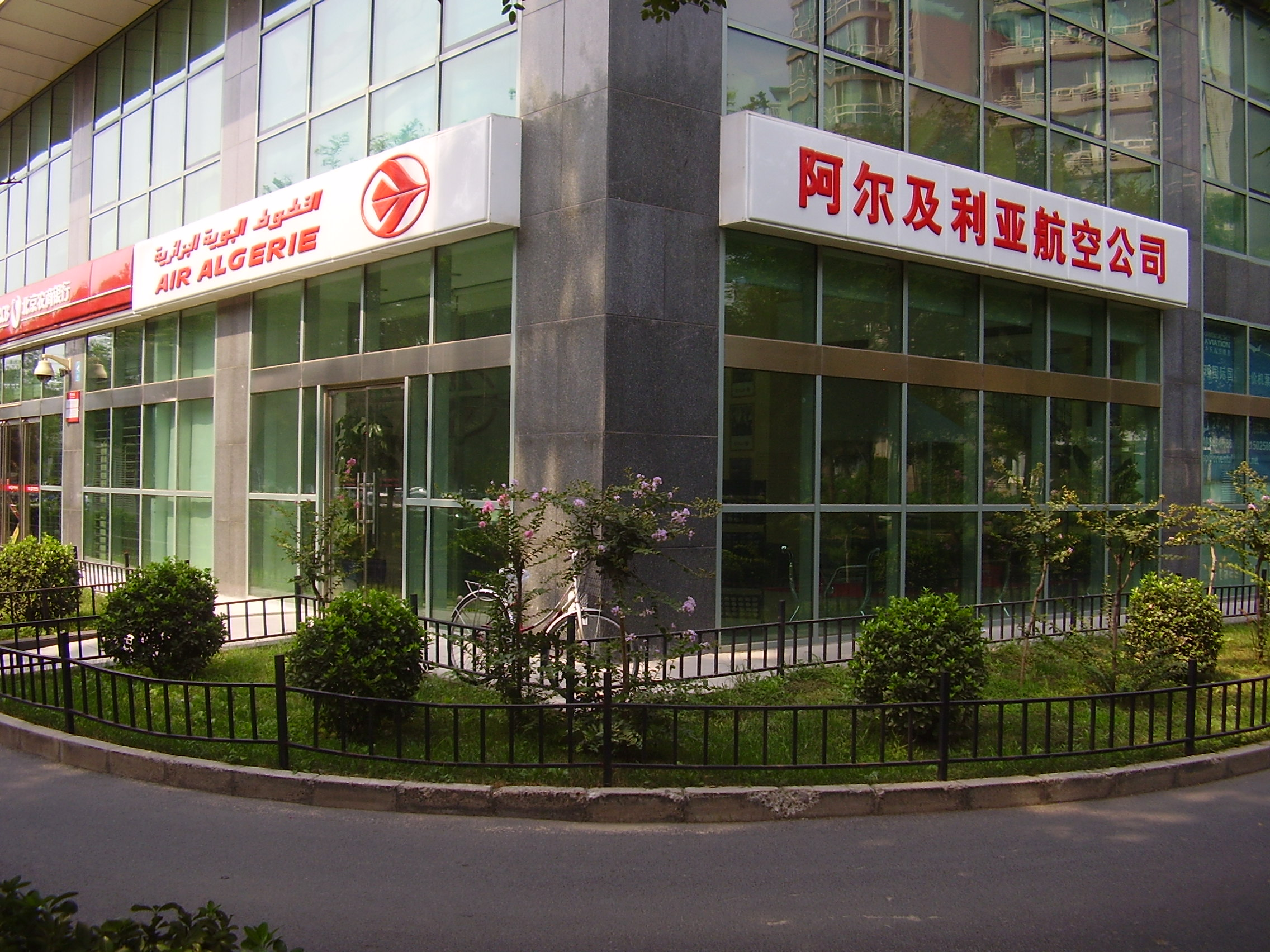
Air Algérie office in Beijing

The airline also provides charter services in support of oil exploration, and the annual Hajj pilgrimage in Mecca.

=== Key people ===
As of August 2024, Hamza Benhamouda is the chief executive officer of the company.

=== Corporate identity ===
The Air Algérie logo was created in 1966 in Algiers. On 21 June 2011, the company officially announced that the logo is a swallow. This bird is a national Algerian symbol. In 2023, the airline updated its logo, with a new typeface and an updated swallow.

== Destinations ==
In June 2007, Air Algérie inaugurated the Algiers–Montreal route. Flights to Beijing were launched in February 2009. As of September 2012, Air Algérie has a 46% market share on international routes; the airline was the leading operator for flights between Algeria and Spain, and six of ten of its international routes with highest seat availability served France.

In October 2015, the carrier serves a domestic network that comprises 32 destinations within Algeria, including its hub at Houari Boumediene Airport, plus an international network that serve 43 more cities.

As of October 2026, the airline serves 44 internationsl and 33 domestics destinations.

Country	City	Airport	Notes	Refs
Algeria	Adrar	Touat-Cheikh Sidi Mohamed Belkebir Airport		
Algeria	Algiers	Houari Boumediene Airport	Hub	
Algeria	Annaba	Rabah Bitat Airport		
Algeria	Batna	Mostépha Ben Boulaid Airport		
Algeria	Béchar	Boudghene Ben Ali Lotfi Airport		
Algeria	Béjaïa	Abane Ramdane Airport		
Algeria	Biskra	Biskra Airport		
Algeria	Bordj Badji Mokhtar	Bordj Badji Mokhtar Airport		
Algeria	Chlef	Chlef International Airport		
Algeria	Constantine	Mohamed Boudiaf International Airport		
Algeria	Djanet	Djanet Inedbirene Airport		
Algeria	El Bayadh	El Bayadh Airport		
Algeria	El Golea	El Golea Airport		
Algeria	El Oued	Guemar Airport		
Algeria	Ghardaïa	Noumérat – Moufdi Zakaria Airport		
Algeria	Hassi Messaoud	Oued Irara–Krim Belkacem Airport		
Algeria	Hassi R'Mel	Hassi R'Mel Airport		
Algeria	Illizi	Takhamalt Airport		
Algeria	In Amenas	In Amenas Airport		
Algeria	In Guezzam	In Guezzam Airport		
Algeria	In Salah	In Salah Airport		
Algeria	Jijel	Jijel Ferhat Abbas Airport		
Algeria	Laghouat	L'Mekrareg Airport		
Algeria	Mascara	Ghriss Airport		
Algeria	Mécheria	Cheikh Bouamama Airport		
Algeria	Oran	Ahmed Ben Bella Airport		
Algeria	Ouargla	Ain Beida Airport		
Algeria	Sétif	Ain Arnat Airport		
Algeria	Tamanrasset	Aguenar – Hadj Bey Akhamok Airport		
Algeria	Tébessa	Cheikh Larbi Tébessa Airport		
Algeria	Tiaret	Abdelhafid Boussouf Bou Chekif Airport		
Algeria	Timimoun	Timimoun Airport		
Algeria	Tindouf	Commandant Ferradj Airport		
Algeria	Tlemcen	Zenata – Messali El Hadj Airport		
Algeria	Touggourt	Sidi Mahdi Airport		
Austria	Vienna	Vienna International Airport		
Belgium	Brussels	Brussels Airport		
Belgium	Charleroi	Brussels South Charleroi Airport		
Burkina Faso	Ouagadougou	Thomas Sankara International Airport Ouagadougou		
Cameroon	Douala	Douala International Airport		
Canada	Montréal	Montréal–Trudeau International Airport		
China	Beijing	Beijing Capital International Airport		
China	Guangzhou	Guangzhou Baiyun International Airport		
China	Shanghai	Shanghai Pudong International Airport		
Egypt	Cairo	Cairo International Airport		
Ethiopia	Addis Ababa	Addis Ababa Bole International Airport		
France	Bordeaux	Bordeaux–Mérignac Airport		
France	Lille	Lille Airport		
France	Lyon	Lyon–Saint-Exupéry Airport		
France	Marseille	Marseille Provence Airport		
France	Metz	Metz–Nancy–Lorraine Airport		
France	Montpellier	Montpellier–Méditerranée Airport		
France	Nice	Nice Côte d'Azur Airport		
France	Paris	Charles de Gaulle Airport		
France	Paris	Orly Airport		
France	Toulouse	Toulouse–Blagnac Airport		
Germany	Frankfurt	Frankfurt Airport		
Germany	Berlin	Berlin Brandenburg Airport	Begins 14 September 2026	
Hungary	Budapest	Budapest Ferenc Liszt International Airport		
India	Delhi	Indira Gandhi International Airport		
Italy	Milan	Milan Malpensa Airport		
Italy	Rome	Leonardo da Vinci–Fiumicino Airport		
Ivory Coast	Abidjan	Félix-Houphouët-Boigny International Airport		
Jordan	Amman	Queen Alia International Airport		
Lebanon	Beirut	Beirut–Rafic Hariri International Airport		
Libya	Tripoli	Mitiga International Airport	Resumes 28 October 2026	
Mali	Bamako	Modibo Keita International Airport		
Malaysia	Kuala Lumpur	Kuala Lumpur International Airport		
Mauritania	Nouakchott	Nouakchott–Oumtounsy International Airport		
Niger	Niamey	Diori Hamani International Airport		
Portugal	Lisbon	Lisbon Airport		
Portugal	Porto	Porto Airport		
Qatar	Doha	Hamad International Airport		
Russia	Moscow	Sheremetyevo International Airport		
Senegal	Dakar	Blaise Diagne International Airport		
Spain	Alicante	Alicante–Elche Miguel Hernández Airport		
Spain	Barcelona	Josep Tarradellas Barcelona–El Prat Airport		
Spain	Madrid	Madrid–Barajas Airport		
Spain	Palma de Mallorca	Palma de Mallorca Airport		
Spain	Valencia	Valencia Airport		
Saudi Arabia	Jeddah	King Abdulaziz International Airport		
Saudi Arabia	Medina	Prince Mohammad bin Abdulaziz International Airport		
South Africa	Johannesburg	O. R. Tambo International Airport		
Switzerland	Geneva	Geneva Airport		
Switzerland; France; Germany	Basel; Mulhouse; Freiburg	EuroAirport Basel Mulhouse Freiburg		
Syria	Damascus	Damascus International Airport		
Tunisia	Tunis	Tunis–Carthage International Airport		
Turkey	Antalya	Antalya Airport		
Turkey	Istanbul	Istanbul Airport		
United Arab Emirates	Dubai	Dubai International Airport		
United Kingdom	London	Heathrow Airport		

=== Codeshare agreements ===
Air Algerie has codeshare agreements with the following airlines:

- Qatar Airways
- Tunisair
- Turkish Airlines

=== Interline agreements ===
Air Algerie has interline agreements with the following airlines:

- Air Burkina
- Emirates
- Lufthansa
- Singapore Airlines

== Fleet ==
=== Recent developments and future plans ===
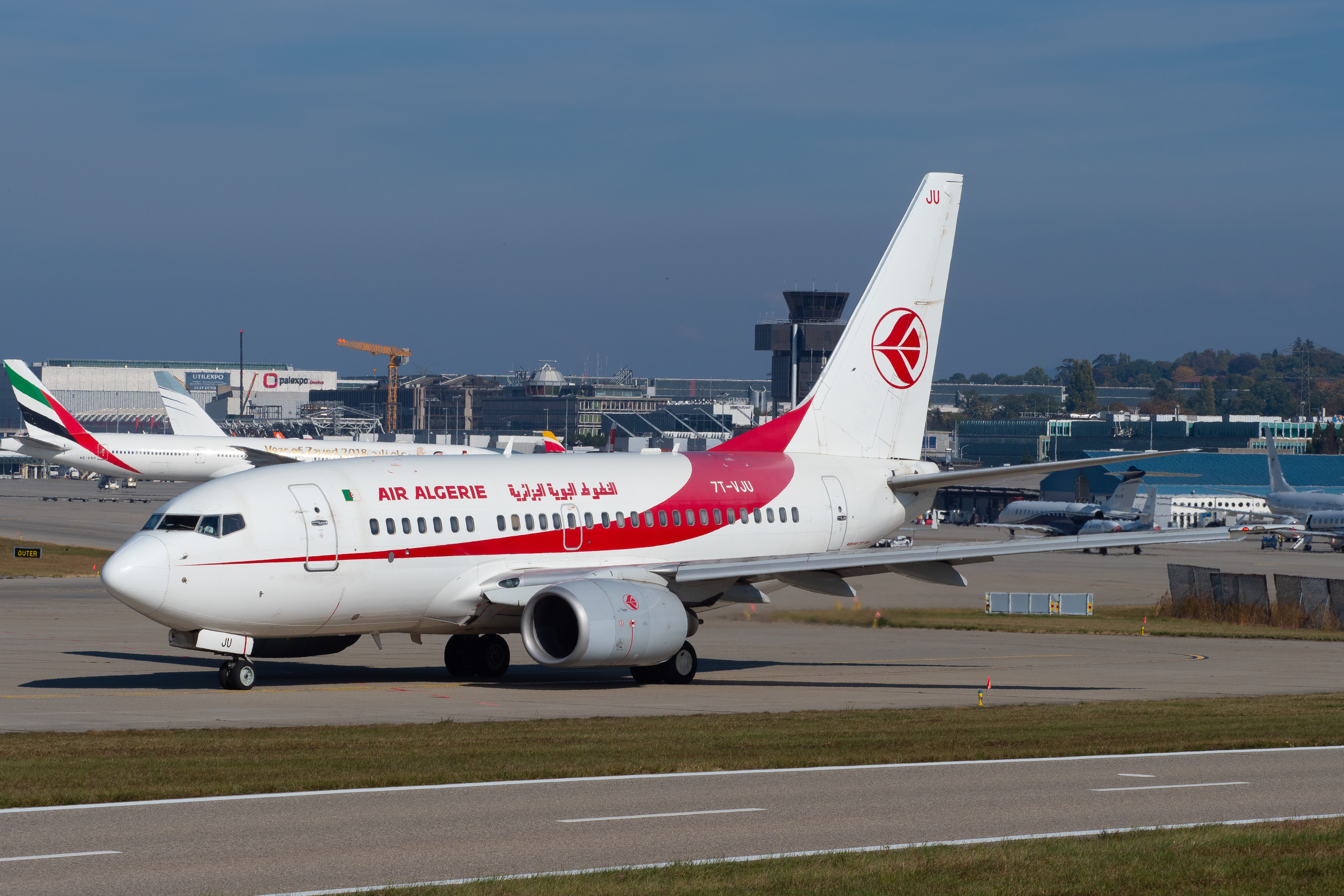
737-600 of Air Algérie at Geneva Airport

Ten Next Generation 737s—seven-800s and three-600s—were ordered in 1998 to replace the ageing Boeing 727-200s and Boeing 737-200s; the 737-600 commitment was later increased to include two more aircraft. The first Boeing 737-800 included in this order was handed over by the airframer in August 2000. When the first Boeing 737-600 was delivered to the company in May 2002, Air Algérie became the fifth airline worldwide in operating the type.

Five Airbus A330-200s were ordered in late 2003, along with nine ATR72-500s—six of them taken over from and order previously placed by Khalifa Airways. The former type would act as a replacement for the two Airbus A310s, a Boeing 747-200 and three Boeing 767-300s, while the latter would replace the seven-strong Fokker F27 fleet. Four more ATR72-500s were ordered in 2009 at a cost of approximately US$82 million, with the first of these 66-seater four turboprop machines being phased-in in February 2010. Also in 2009, during the Dubai Airshow, Air Algérie announced the purchase of seven additional Boeing 737-800s. In April 2011, the fourth aircraft from this order became the 50th Boeing jetliner delivered to the company.

In November 2012, the airline announced an investment worth €600 million for the incorporation of eight aircraft, two of them freighters, between 2012 and 2016. Air Algérie had its IOSA certification renewed in December 2012, for a period of two years. In February 2013, unofficial announcements disclosed the airline has ordered three additional Airbus A330-200s, five additional Boeing 737-800s. It was also reported the carrier's intention of deploying the new A330s on new routes to Johannesburg, New York, Shanghai and São Paulo.

The airline launched in April 2013 a tender for the acquisition of 14 passenger and two cargo aircraft. Plans for the purchase of new equipment worth US$762 million (€556 million), including three 250-seater airframes to replace the ageing Boeing 767s, were disclosed again in December 2013; already in November, Air Algérie signed a letter of intent with Airbus for three Airbus A330-200s at the 2013 Dubair Air Show. In January 2014, three 68-seater ATR 72-600s were ordered, and a commitment for eight Boeing 737-800s, valued at US$724 million at list prices, was signed with Boeing. The ATR order made Air Algérie the largest operator of the type within Africa. In May the same year, two Boeing 737-700Cs were ordered for US$152 million. Air Algérie's first ATR 72-600 was handed over to the company in December 2014.

In June 2023, the company ordered five Airbus A330-900s and two Airbus A350-1000s from Airbus; an order for eight Boeing 737 MAX 9 was placed with Boeing and a commitment for the purchase of two Boeing 737BCFs was also signed. In addition to this, 10 other aircraft will be leased, including four Airbus A330ceo, two Airbus A330-900, two Boeing 737-800 and two Boeing 737 MAX 9.

=== Current fleet ===
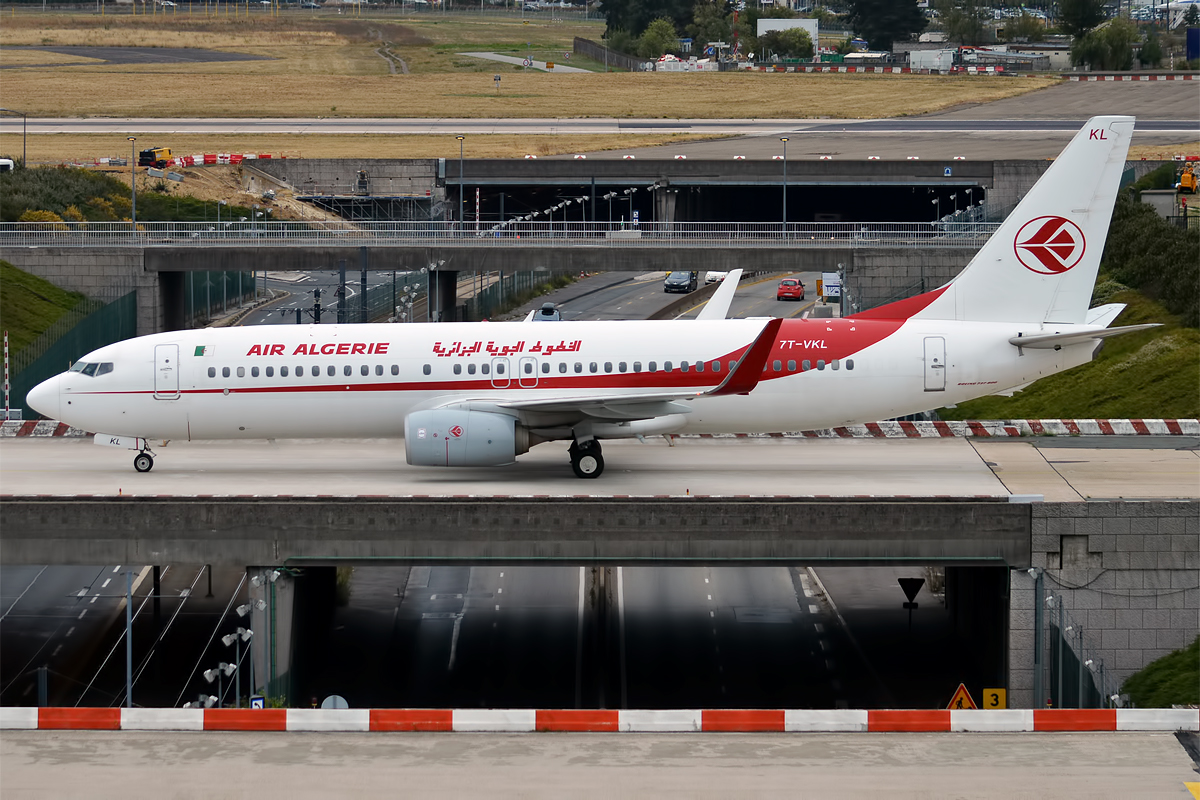
An Air Algérie Boeing 737-800 taxiing at Charles de Gaulle Airport

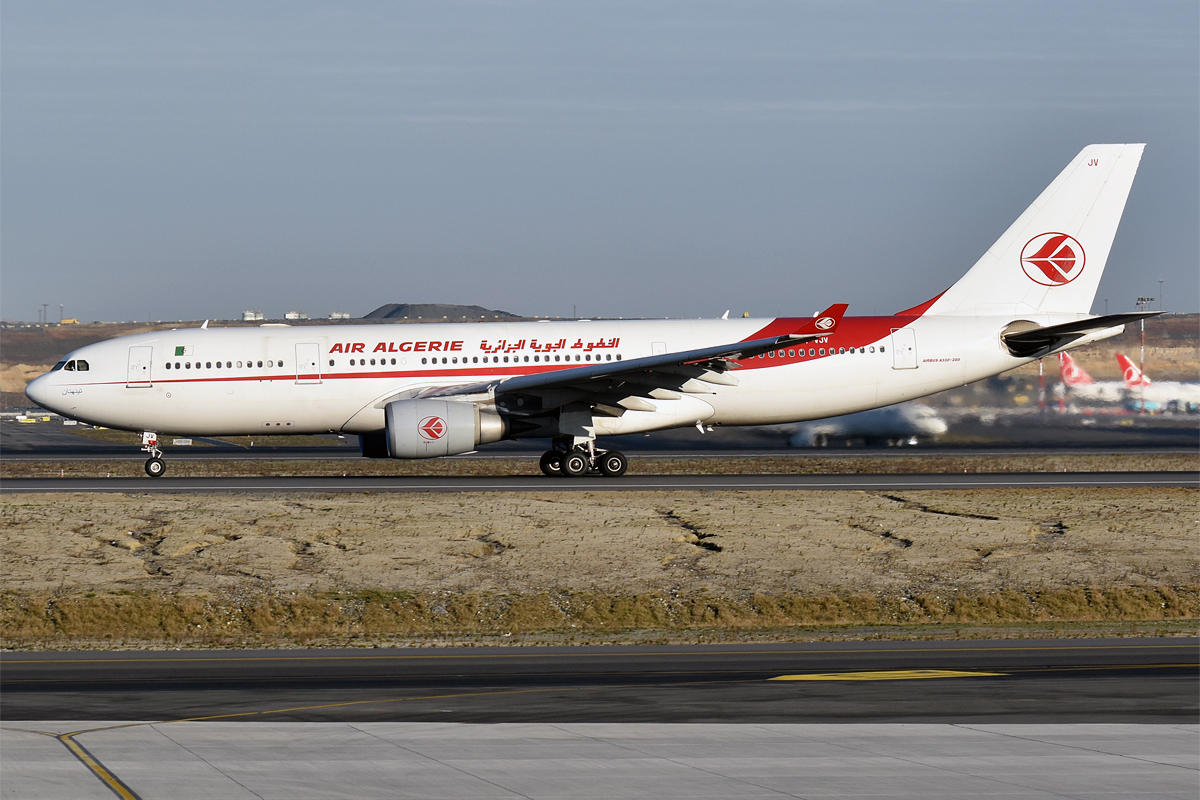
An Air Algérie Airbus A330-200

As of October 2026, Air Algérie operates the following aircraft:

Air Algérie fleet
Aircraft	In fleet	Orders	Passengers				Notes
Aircraft	In fleet	Orders	B	P	Y	Total	Notes
Airbus A330-200	8	—	14	22	196	232	
Airbus A330-200	8	—	18	14	219	251	
Airbus A330-900	5	7	18	24	266	308	
ATR 72-500	12	—	—	—	66	66	
ATR 72-500	12	—	—	—	70	70	
ATR 72-600	3	16	—	—	68	68	Deliveries from 2026
Boeing 737-600	5	—	—	16	85	101	
Boeing 737-700C	2	—	—	8	104	112	
Boeing 737-800	25	—	—	48	114	162	
Boeing 737 MAX 8	—	10	TBA				Deliveries from 2026.
Boeing 737 MAX 9	—	8	TBA				Deliveries from 2027.
Cargo
Boeing 737-800BCF	1	—	Cargo				
Lockheed L-100-30T	1	—	Cargo				
Total	62	42					

=== Historical fleet ===
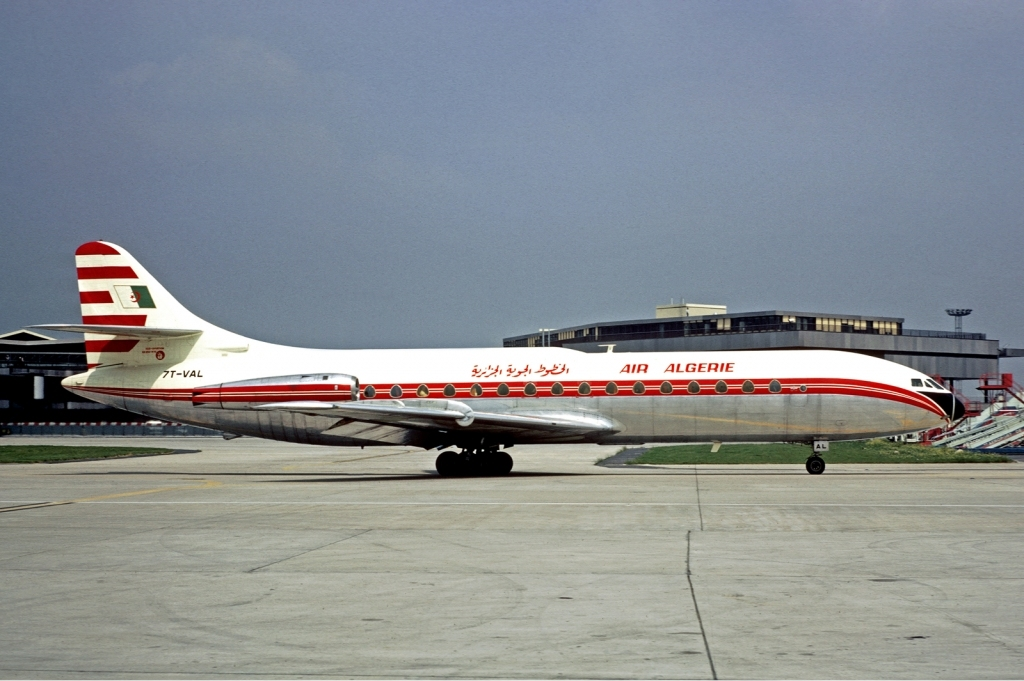
An Air Algérie Sud Aviation Caravelle at Paris Orly Airport in 1971. Air Algérie became the first private French airline in ordering the type in 1958, and received the first of them in early 1960. Caravelles were operated until the mid-1970s.

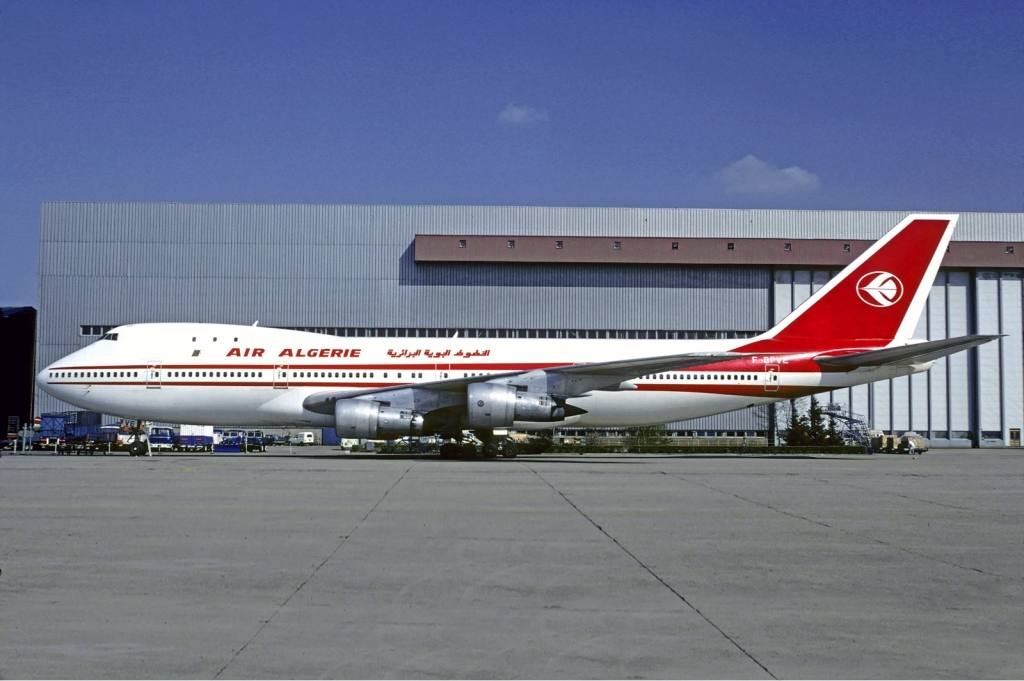
An Air Algérie Boeing 747-100 in 1982

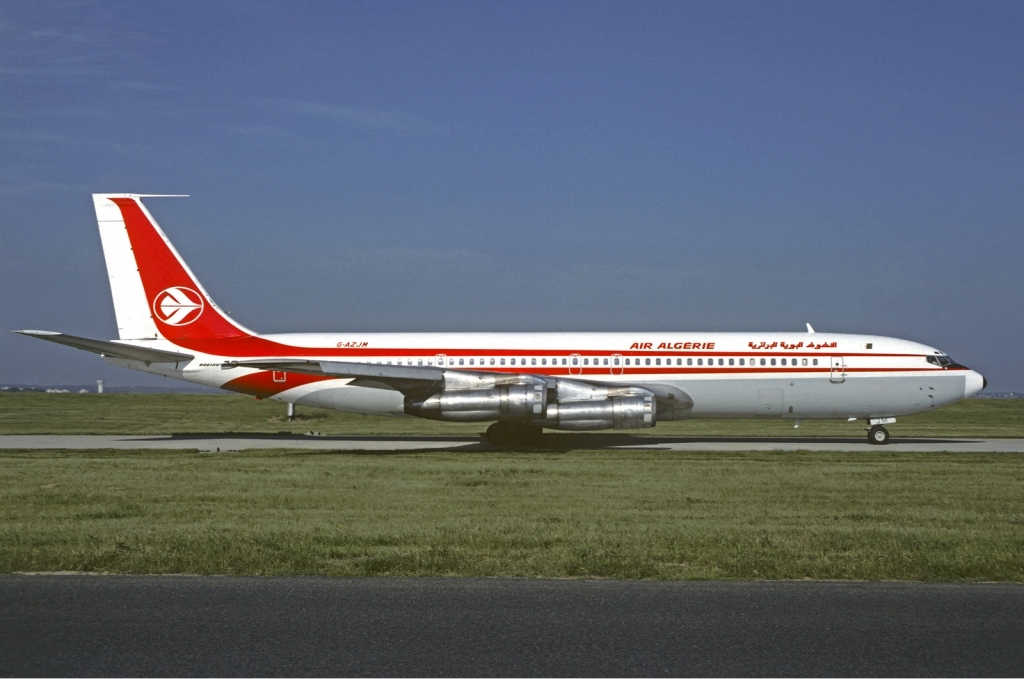
An Air Algérie Boeing 707 at Orly Airport in 1979

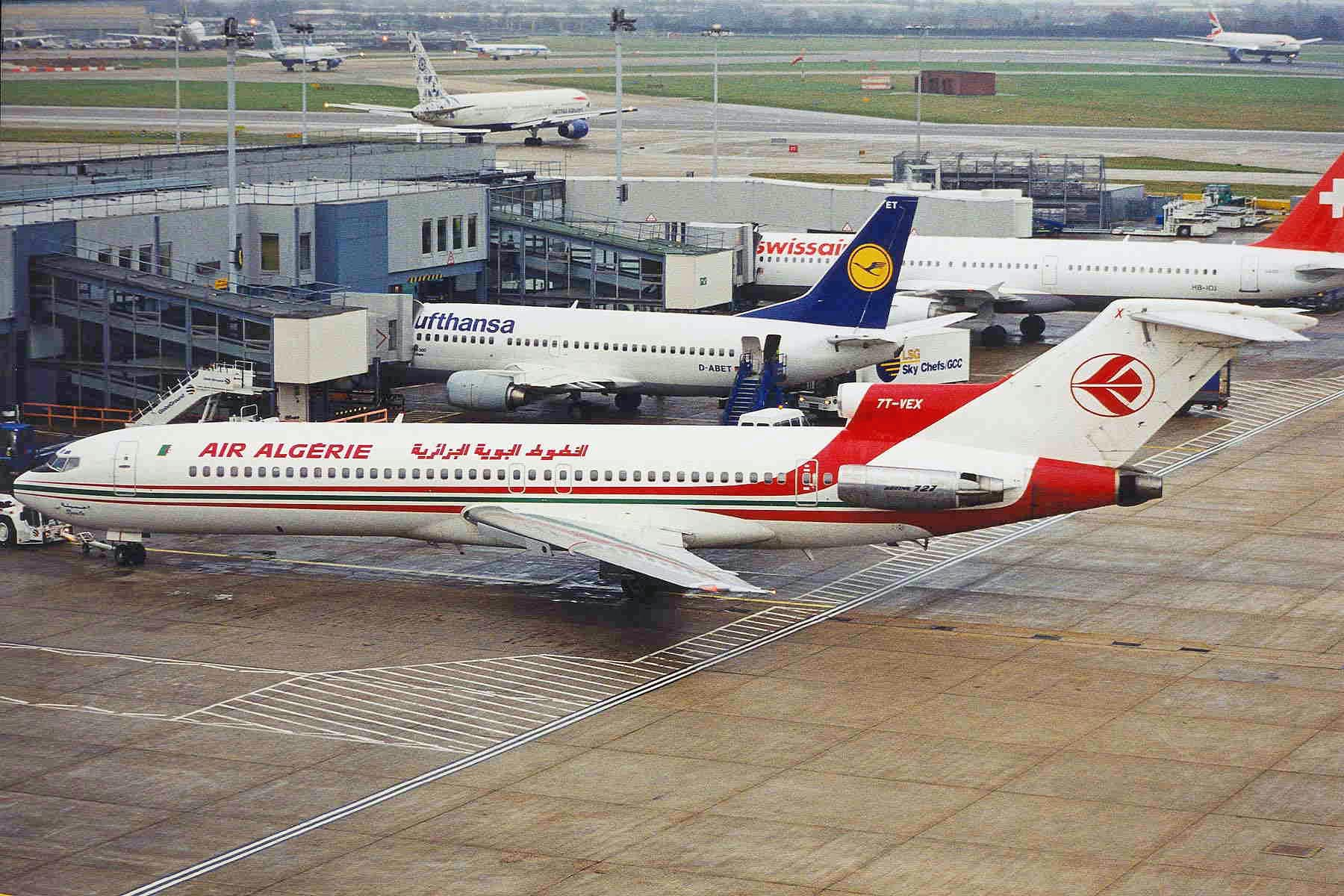
An Air Algérie Boeing 727-200 At Heathrow Airport in 1994

So far, Air Algérie has operated the following aircraft types:

Aircraft	Total	Introduced	Retired	Notes	Refs
Aérospatiale N 262	Unknown	Unknown	Unknown		
Airbus A300B4	2	Unknown	Unknown	Leased from Lufthansa	
Airbus A310-300	2	2005	2007		
Airbus A320-200	4	2005	2015	All fleet were leased	
Airbus A330-300	8	2014	2016	All fleet were leased	
Airbus A340-300	3	2012	2014	All fleet were leased	
Beechcraft Queen Air	Unknown	Unknown	Unknown	Light aircraft operated as freighter	
Boeing 707	Unknown	1971	Unknown		
Boeing 727-100	Unknown	Unknown	Unknown		
Boeing 727-200	Unknown	Unknown	Unknown		
Boeing 737-400	5	1999	2002		
Boeing 737-400SF	3	2004	2009		
Boeing 747-100	5	1979	1986		
Boeing 747-100SF	1	1986	1986		
Boeing 747-200	1	2005	2006	Leased from Air Atlanta Icelandic	
Boeing 747-200C	3	1975	1982	Leased from World Airways	
Boeing 747-200M	1	2004	2004	Leased from Air Atlanta Icelandic	
Boeing 747-200SF	1	1981	1985		
Boeing 767-300	5	1990	2019		
Bréguet 763 Deux-Ponts	Unknown	1952	1953	Launch customer Operated as freighter	
Convair CV-640	Unknown	Unknown	Unknown		
Douglas C-47 Skytrain	Unknown	Unknown	Unknown		
Douglas C-54 Skymaster	Unknown	Unknown	Unknown		
Douglas DC-4	Unknown	Unknown	Unknown		
Douglas DC-6	Unknown	Unknown	Unknown		
Fokker F27 Friendship	Unknown	Unknown	Unknown		
Grumman Ag Cat	Unknown	Unknown	Unknown	Agricultural aircraft operated as freighter	
Handley Page Dart Herald	Unknown	Unknown	Unknown		
Lockheed Constellation	Unknown	Unknown	Unknown		
McDonnell Douglas MD-83	Unknown	Unknown	Unknown	Leased from Swiftair	(Note: One aircraft destroyed in a crash on 24 July 2014.)
Piper PA-32	Unknown	Unknown	Unknown	Light aircraft operated as freighter	
Sud Aviation Caravelle	Unknown	1960	Unknown		
Sud-Ouest Bretagne	Unknown	Unknown	Unknown		
Vickers Viscount	Unknown	Unknown	Unknown		

To cope with the increased passenger volume during the Hajj and Umrah pilgrimages, Air Algérie leased Boeing 747 aircraft. Other aircraft types that were operated on short-term leases during the Hajj season included the Airbus A310-300 (2005–07, leased from Saga Airlines and Air Atlanta Icelandic), the Airbus A320-200 (2005, operated by Eagle Aviation France), the larger Airbus A330-300 (2004/05, leased from AWAS), Airbus A340-300 (2012, from AirAsia X), Boeing 757-200 (2004/05), Boeing 767-200 (2001/02 and 2004/05, leased from Air Atlanta Icelandic) and Boeing 777-200 (2003, operated by Khalifa Airways), as well as the Douglas DC-8 (from the mid-1970s throughout the 1980s, leased from Eagle Air, Icelandair, National Airlines, Trans International Airlines and World Airways), the Lockheed L-1011 TriStar (1989/90, leased from American Trans Air, Caledonian Airways and Eastern Airlines), and the McDonnell Douglas DC-10 (1977, from Laker Airways).

== Accidents and incidents ==
=== Fatal ===
- On 19 May 1960 at 9:46 UTC, a mid-air collision occurred 8 mi (13 km) away from Paris-Orly Airport, involving an Air Algérie Sud Aviation Caravelle jetliner (registered F-OBNI) on a scheduled passenger flight from Algiers, and a privately owned Stampe SV.4 biplane (F-BDEV). The Stampe was completely destroyed upon impact, killing the sole pilot on board. The impact and the propeller blades of the biplane tore open the cabin roof of the Caravelle, and both of its jet engines flamed out due to ingested debris but were restarted almost immediately, allowing for a safe landing. There was one fatality amongst the 32 passengers and 7 crew members of the Air Algérie flight, and the aircraft was later repaired.
- On 11 April 1967, an Air Algérie Douglas DC-4 (registered 7T-VAU), which was on a flight from Dar El Beïda Airport in Algiers to Tamanrasset Airport, crashed into a hill in the Sahara desert near Tamanrasset during landing approach, killing 29 of the 33 passengers and all 6 crew members on board.
- On 26 July 1969 a fire broke out on board an Air Algérie Sud Aviation Caravelle (registered 7T-VAK), which likely had been caused by an electric malfunction. The aircraft was on a chartered passenger flight from Marseille to Biskra, and the pilots tried for an emergency landing at Oued Irara – Krim Belkacem Airport, but the plane was quickly engulfed by flames and crashed, killing all 30 passengers and 7 crew members.
- On 24 January 1979 at around 19:40 local time, an Air Algérie Aérospatiale N 262 (registered 7T-VSU) crashed 15 kilometres short of the runway of Boudghene Ben Ali Lotfi Airport, resulting in the death of 14 out of the 20 passengers on board. The three crew members survived the accident, which was blamed on the malfunction of an altimeter (as the approach was performed too low), coinciding with pilot error and fatigue.
- On 21 December 1994, a cargo-configured Boeing 737-200 operating Air Algérie Flight 702P from East Midlands Airport to Coventry Airport (both in England) on behalf of Phoenix Aviation crashed 1.7 kilometres short of the runway at the destination airport, killing the five crew members on board.
- On 6 March 2003 at 15:15 local time, Air Algérie Flight 6289, a Boeing 737-200 (registered 7T-VEZ) on a domestic flight from Tamanrasset to Algiers via Ghardaïa, crashed shortly after take-off from Aguenar – Hadj Bey Akhamok Airport because of an engine failure, killing 96 passengers and all 6 crew members on board. There was only one survivor.
- On 13 August 2006 at ca 20:15 local time, Air Algérie Flight 2208 (a Lockheed L-100 Hercules registered 7T-VHG) crashed near Piacenza in Italy, resulting in the death of the three crew members. The aircraft had been on a flight from Algiers to Frankfurt when a problem with the autopilot occurred, resulting in the pilots losing control of the plane.
- On 24 July 2014, ATC controllers lost contact with Air Algérie Flight 5017, a McDonnell Douglas MD-83 leased from Swiftair, en route from Ouagadougou Airport in Ouagadougou, Burkina Faso to Houari Boumediene Airport in Algiers, Algeria, which was reported missing at 01:55 or 02:00 UTC near to Gao, Mali. The flight was carrying 110 passengers and 6 Spanish crew members. 54 of the passengers were French citizens. It was found crashed in Mali. On 28 September 2026, in the criminal proceedings arising from the crash, the Paris Criminal Court found Swiftair, which had supplied the aircraft and crew to Air Algérie, guilty of corporate manslaughter and fined it €225,000. The court found that negligence by Swiftair in crew training had contributed to the accident. Swiftair disputed its liability. At the time of the judgment, the company had ten days to appeal.

=== Non-fatal ===
- On 8 June 1949, the right main landing gear of an Air Algérie Douglas C-47 Skytrain (registered F-BCYO) collapsed upon landing at Lyon-Bron Airport, following a cargo flight from Algiers. During the crash landing, the aircraft was destroyed, but the three crew members survived.
- On 30 October 1951, an Air Algérie Sud-Ouest Bretagne (registered F-OAIY) caught fire and was subsequently destroyed at Paris-Orly Airport, following the sudden collapse of the right main landing gear during take-off run. All 30 passengers and 4 crew members on board could be saved.
- On 26 April 1962, shortly after the end of the Algerian War, a parked Air Algérie Lockheed Constellation (registered F-BAZE) was blown up at Maison Blanche Airport by OAS terrorists, a militant French far-right nationalist group strongly opposed to the independence of Algeria.
- On 23 September 1973, an Air Algérie Sud Aviation Caravelle (registered 7T-VAI) was damaged beyond repair in a landing accident at Algiers-Dar el Beida Airport.
- On 1 August 1989, an Air Algérie Lockheed L-100 Hercules cargo aircraft suffered a ground loop upon landing at Tamanrasset Airport following a flight from Algiers, resulting in the aircraft being damaged beyond repair.
- On 25 July 1991, the nosegear of an Air Algérie Fokker F27 Friendship (registered 7T-VRM) collapsed during a hard landing at In Guezzam Airport, damaging the aircraft beyond repair.
- On 2 August 1996, an Air Algérie Boeing 737-200 (registered 7T-VED) overran the runway at Tlemcen Airport in an attempt to abort the take-off for a scheduled flight to Algiers. There were no fatalities among the 100 passengers and 6 crew members on board, even though the aircraft was substantially damaged.
- Another runway overshot involving an Air Algérie Boeing 737-200 (this time 7T-VEH) occurred on 31 January 1999. Upon landing at Constantine Airfield in unusual snowy conditions following a flight from Paris, the aircraft was severely damaged when it overshot the runway and struck a heap of snow. There were no casualties among the 92 passengers and 7 crew members.
- On 18 March 2006 at 10:30 local time, the right main landing gear of an Air Algérie Boeing 737-600 (registered 7T-VJQ) collapsed upon landing in poor weather conditions at Seville Airport following a flight from Oran. Approximately 45 out of the 101 passengers and 6 crew members on board were injured.
- On 14 March 2008, an Air Algérie Boeing 737-800 (registered 7T-VKA) that was operating Flight 1143 from Paris to Sétif with 120 people on board suffered extensive damage during a hard landing at Ain Arnat Airport.

=== Hijackings ===
- On 31 August 1970, three passengers armed with pistols and molotov cocktails hijacked an Air Algérie Convair CV-640 on a scheduled domestic flight from Annaba to Algiers and demanded the pilots to head to Albania instead. During a fuel stop in Brindisi, eleven passengers were allowed to leave the aircraft. As the aircraft was denied landing permission by the Albanian authorities, it diverted to Dubrovnik in then Yugoslavia instead, where the perpetrators could be arrested.
- When an Air Algérie Boeing 737-200 landed at Houari Boumedienne Airport on 31 March 1991 (during the Algerian Civil War) following a scheduled passenger flight from Béchar, a passenger threatened to detonate a hand grenade and insisted on being allowed to have a political statement on live national television, concerning the planned national election. The demand was rejected, and the hijacker was persuaded to give up and set free the 53 other persons on board.
- A similar hijacking occurred on 13 November 1994 on board an Air Algérie Fokker F27 Friendship (registered 7T-VRK) during a flight from Algiers to Ouargla. The aircraft with 42 occupants was forced to divert to Palma de Mallorca Airport, where the three perpetrators surrendered.
- On 25 July 1996 at around 9:00 local time, an Air Algérie Boeing 767-300 with 232 persons on board was hijacked at Oran Es Sénia Airport by a man who demanded to be flown to the United States, rather than to Algiers where the aircraft had been scheduled to leave for. After more than four hours of negotiation he surrendered to the local authorities.
- On 19 January 2003, Air Algérie Flight 6025 from Constantine to Algiers was hijacked shortly after take-off by a man who demanded the pilots fly the Boeing 737-800 to North Korea. The flight continued to Algiers, though, where the perpetrator could be restrained by police forces storming the aircraft. None of the 24 other passengers and 6 crew members were injured.
- On 19 August 2003, an Air Algérie Boeing 737-800 was hijacked by a mentally-ill passenger right after take-off from Houari Boumedienne Airport, who threatened to blow up the aircraft when the crew would not divert to Geneva (rather than to Lille as the flight was scheduled to). The crew carried out an allegedly necessary fuel stop at Oran Es Sénia Airport, where the man could be arrested.

== See also ==
- List of airlines of Algeria
- Transport in Algeria

== Bibliography ==
- Guttery, Ben R. (1998). Encyclopedia of African Airlines. Jefferson, NC: McFarland & Company. ISBN 978-0-7864-0495-7.
