= Oued Irara–Krim Belkacem Airport =

Oued Irara–Krim Belkacem Airport Aéroport de Hassi Messaoud / Oued Irara–Krim Belkacem
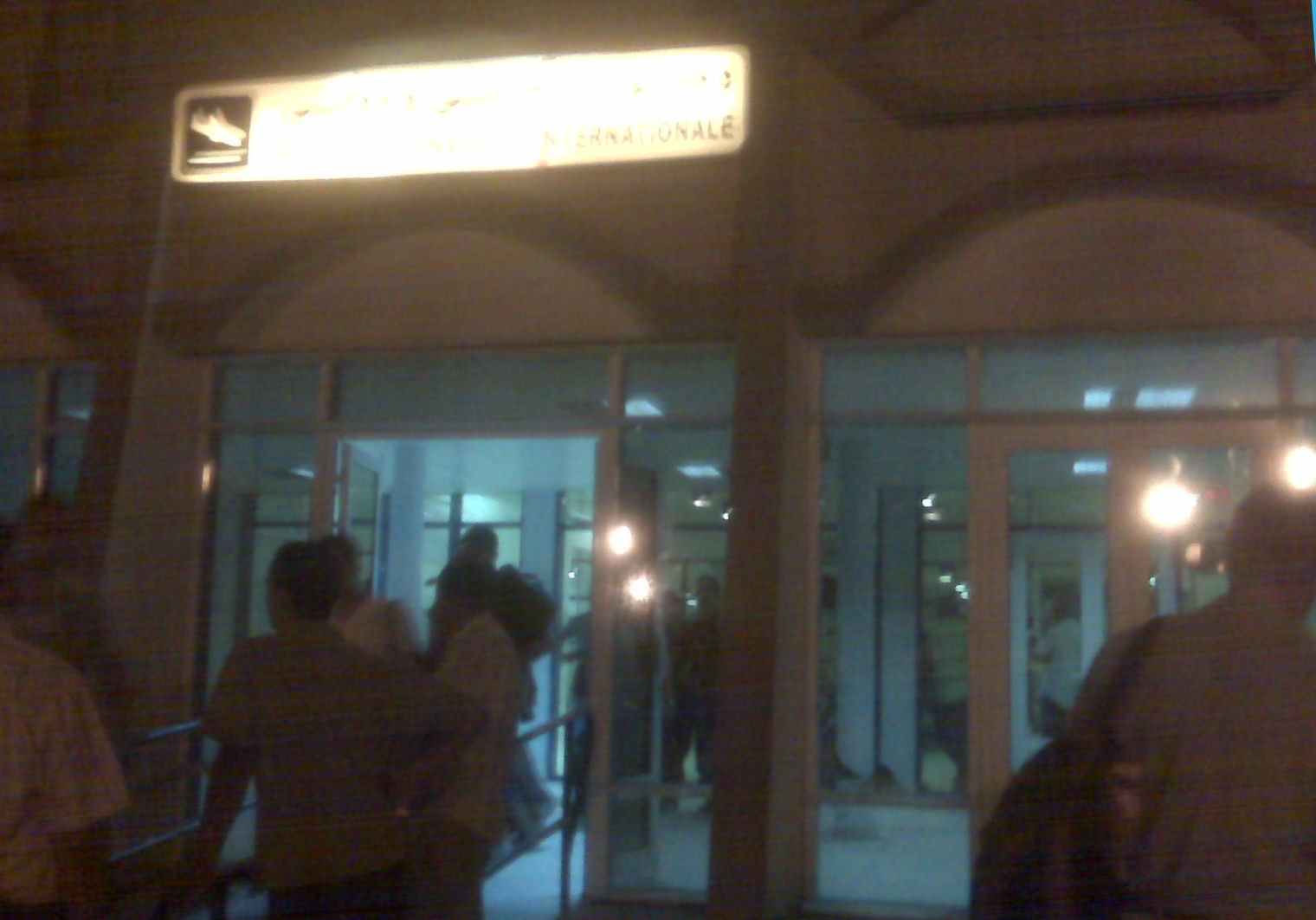
- IATA: HME; ICAO: DAUH

Summary
- Airport type: Public
- Operator: EGSA Alger
- Serves: Hassi Messaoud, Algeria
- Elevation AMSL: 140 m / 459 ft
- Coordinates: 31°40′20″N 6°8′25″E

Map
- Location of airport in Algeria

Runways
Direction	Length		Surface
Direction	m	ft	Surface
18/36	3,000	9,843	Asphalt

Statistics (2010)
- Passengers: 450,929
- Passenger change 09–10: ▼0.3%
- Aircraft movements: 24,174
- Movements change 09–10: ▲2.1%
- Sources: AIP, EGSA Alger, DAFIF Landings.com, Airport Council International's 2010 World Airport Traffic Report.

Oued Irara–Krim Belkacem Airport (French: Aéroport de Hassi Messaoud / Oued Irara–Krim Belkacem) (IATA: HME, ICAO: DAUH) is an airport serving Hassi Messaoud, a city in the Ouargla Province of eastern Algeria. It is located 5 nautical miles (9.3 km) southeast of the city. The airport is named for Krim Belkacem (1922–1970), an Algerian revolutionary fighter and politician.

Takeoff from Oued Irara from an Aigle Azur Airbus A320

== Airlines and destinations ==
Airlines	Destinations
Air Algérie	Algiers, Constantine, In Amenas, Oran
Tassili Airlines	Algiers, Annaba, Bejaia, Constantine, Oran

== Statistics ==
Traffic by calendar year. Official ACI Statistics
	Passengers	Change from previous year	Aircraft operations	Change from previous year	Cargo (metric tons)	Change from previous year
2005	377,640	▲62.61%	20,855	▼1.12%	2,677	▲86.94%
2006	410,773	▲8.77%	22,856	▲9.59%	3,663	▲36.83%
2007	396,530	▼3.47%	22,971	▲0.50%	3,562	▼2.76%
2008	450,451	▲13.60%	23,860	▲3.87%	3,470	▼2.58%
2009	452,388	▲0.43%	23,676	▼0.77%	2,970	▼14.41%
2010	450,929	▼0.32%	24,174	▲2.10%	2,874	▼3.23%
Source: Airports Council International. World Airport Traffic Reports (Years 2005, 2006, 2007, 2009 and 2010)
