= Abdelhafid Boussouf Bou Chekif Airport =

- IATA: TID; ICAO: DAOB

Summary
- Serves: Tiaret, Algeria
- Elevation AMSL: 989 m (3,245 ft)
- Coordinates: 35°20′30″N 1°28′00″E

Map
- Location of airport in Algeria

Runways
Direction	Length		Surface
Direction	m	ft	Surface
08/26	3,000	9,843	Asphalt
- Source: Algerian AIP Landings.com

Abdelhafid Boussouf Bou Chekif Airport (IATA: TID, ICAO: DAOB), also known as Bou Chekif Airport, is an airport serving Tiaret, Algeria. It is 10 kilometres (6.2 mi) east of the town.

== Airlines and destinations ==
Airlines	Destinations
Air Algérie	Algiers
Domestic Airlines	Algiers
Tassili Airlines	Algiers

== See also ==
- Transport in Algeria
- List of airports in Algeria
