= Air Algérie Flight 6289 =

2003 aviation accident in Algeria

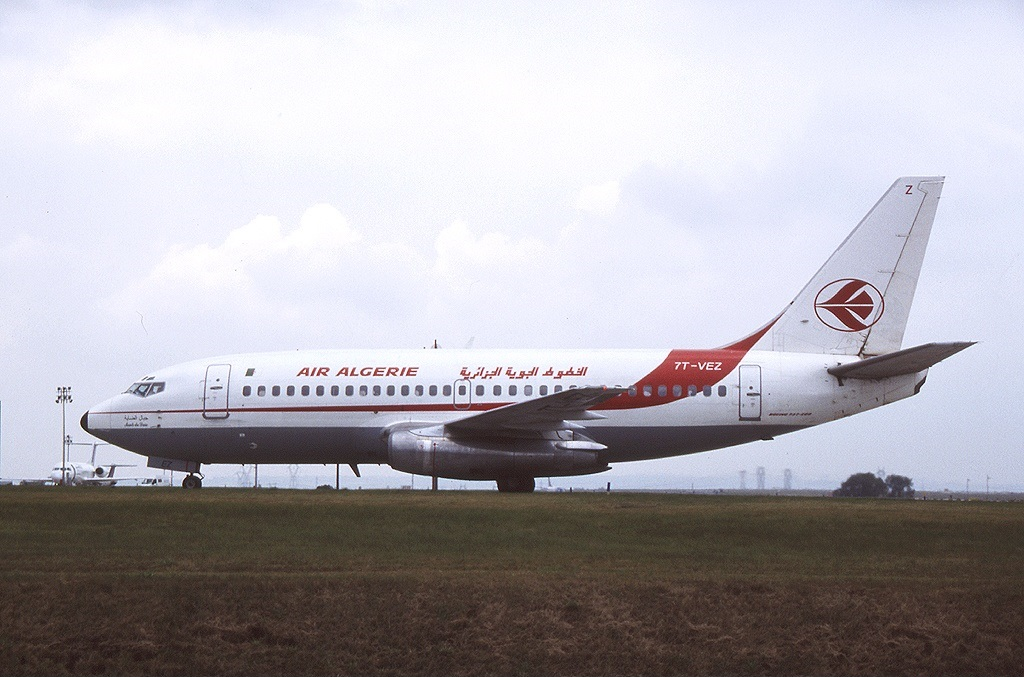
- 7T-VEZ, the aircraft involved in the accident, seen in 2002

Accident
- Date: 6 March 2003
- Summary: EFTO leading to pilot error and stall
- Site: Aguenar – Hadj Bey Akhamok Airport, Tamanrasset, Algeria; 22°47′N 5°31′E

Aircraft
- Aircraft type: Boeing 737-2T4
- Aircraft name: Monts du Daia
- Operator: Air Algérie
- IATA flight No.: AH6289
- ICAO flight No.: DAH6289
- Call sign: AIR ALGERIE 6289
- Registration: 7T-VEZ
- Flight origin: Aguenar – Hadj Bey Akhamok Airport, Tamanrasset, Algeria
- Stopover: Noumérat – Moufdi Zakaria Airport, Ghardaïa, Algeria
- Destination: Houari Boumediene Airport, Algiers, Algeria
- Occupants: 103
- Passengers: 97
- Crew: 6
- Fatalities: 102
- Injuries: 1
- Survivors: 1

Air Algérie Flight 6289 (AH6289) was an Algerian domestic passenger flight from Tamanrasset to the nation's capital of Algiers with a stopover in Ghardaïa, operated by Algerian national airline Air Algérie. On 6 March 2003, the aircraft operating the flight, a Boeing 737-200, crashed near the Trans-Sahara Highway shortly after taking off from Tamanrasset's Aguenar – Hadj Bey Akhamok Airport, killing all but one of the 103 people on board. At the time of the accident, it was the deadliest aviation disaster on Algerian soil.

The investigation concluded that a flight crew error caused the crash following an engine failure shortly after take-off. The captain of Flight 6289 had taken over the control from the first officer without adequate identification of the actual emergency. As the captain could not comprehend the exact cause of the emergency, appropriate corrective actions were not taken, despite the attempts of the first officer. The speed drastically dropped and the aircraft crashed into the terrain.

== Background ==
=== Aircraft ===
The aircraft was a 19-year old Boeing 737-2T4 with an Algerian aircraft registration of 7T-VEZ, equipped with two Pratt & Whitney JT8D-17A engines. The aircraft entered service on 9 December 1983 and had flown for more than 40,000 hours.

According to the maintenance logs, the aircraft was maintained in accordance with the written maintenance manual. The last major overhaul had been conducted from October to November 2002. The left engine was installed in 2002 and the right engine was installed in 2001. The left engine and the right engine had accrued a total of 30,586 flight hours and 22,884 flight hours, respectively.

=== Passengers and crew ===
The aircraft was carrying 97 passengers and 6 crew members. A passenger manifest listed 6 French passengers on board but, according to the Algerian Foreign Minister, all 97 passengers held dual French-Algerian nationality. Authorities stated that 38 passengers would have disembarked in Ghardaïa, while the remaining 59 were heading to Algiers. Among the passengers were 14 members of the Mouloudia d'Adriane football team, who were heading to Ghardaïa for the regional qualification of the Algerian League One.

There were six crew members on board, consisting of two flight crew and four cabin crew. The captain, 48-year-old Boualem Benaouicha, (Note: Arabic: بوعلام بن عويشة) had accumulated a total of 10,760 hours of flight experience, including 1,087 hours on the Boeing 737-200 as captain. He had obtained his licence to fly a Boeing 737 in 2001. The first officer, identified as 44-year-old Fatima Yousfi, (Note: Arabic: فاطمة يوسفي) had accumulated a total of 5,219 flight hours, including 1,292 hours on the Boeing 737-200. Fatima Yousfi is Algeria's first female commercial pilot. According to Algerian French-language newspaper Liberté, she was a sister of Algerian government official Youcef Yousfi.

== Accident ==
Flight 6289 was a flight from Tamanrasset, the capital of Tamanrasset Province, to the Algerian capital of Algiers with a stopover in Ghardaïa. The flight was popular for Algerians and tourists as Tamanrasset was known for its archaeological sites and was the capital of the Tuareg people. The fare was also described as fairly cheap. On 6 March 2003, the flight was carrying 97 passengers and 6 crew members, with First Officer Yousfi as the pilot flying. The temperature was high and the visibility was good.

At about 15:01 CET, pushback clearance was requested by the crew and the ATC cleared the crew to taxi to Runway 02. As the flight crew reported that they were ready for take-off, the ATC later asked the crew to line up and later cleared the crew for take-off to Ghardaïa. The crew chose a V_{1} of 144 knots (267 km/h; 166 mph), V_{R} of 146 knots (270 km/h; 168 mph) and V_{2} of 150 knots (280 km/h; 170 mph) with a maximum thrust on take-off.

Flight 6289 took off from Tamanrasset at 15:13 CET. Shortly after, an explosion occurred in one of the engines. The explosion was loud enough to be heard by workers in Tamanrasset's air traffic control tower and other witnesses in the area. Debris was seen dropping onto the runway. Due to the explosion, the aircraft swayed to the left; later it veered to the right as the crew tried to correct its heading. Seconds later, First Officer Yousfi reported, "We have a small problem."

The aircraft continued to climb with its landing gear still extended, reaching a maximum height of around 400 ft (120 m) before its airspeed significantly dropped from 160 knots (300 km/h; 180 mph) to its stall speed. It descended with its nose in up position and eventually crashed onto a field at 15:15 CET, striking the ground with its right side and bursting into flames. The wreckage slid across the ground and struck the airport's perimeter fence, crossed a road and finally came to rest.

The impact and the fire that had erupted due to the crash immediately killed 102 people on board. The cockpit occupants, including the captain, first officer, and the chief attendant, were killed due to the impact. The rest of the occupants were killed due to the massive explosion that had been caused by the crash. The sole survivor of the accident was 28-year-old Algerian soldier Youcef Djillali. He was seated in the last row with his seat belt unfastened (as indicated in his statement) and was ejected from the plane upon impact, escaping from the accident. The man was found in a coma with multiple injuries. However, he regained consciousness the next day. Doctors said that his injuries were not life-threatening.

== Investigation ==
Prime Minister of Algeria Ali Benflis immediately set up a commission to investigate the accident. Under the Algerian Ministry of Transport, the commission was led by Ahcéne Affane, Director General of the Algerian Ministry of Transport. Technical support from the French BEA was requested. Additionally, the investigation was assisted by representatives from the NTSB, FAA and Pratt & Whitney Canada. A total of seven meetings were held to analyse the result and the progress of the investigation.

=== Engine failure on take-off ===
There were widespread reports that one of the engines had caught fire shortly after take-off from Tamanrasset. Officials also reported that "technical problems" might have been the cause of the crash as there had been reports of an explosion on one of the engines. Testimonies from multiple witnesses were consistent with an explosion as they claimed that a large thumping noise was heard immediately after take-off from Tamanrasset. Initial examination on the runway later revealed the presence of debris from one of the aircraft's engines. During the wreckage examination, investigators discovered that during the flight the left engine was rotating at low speed with no thrust.

A more thorough examination was then carried out. Analysis on the left engine revealed that the nozzle guide vanes (stator blades) had been severely damaged, particularly on the lower part of the engine. As some parts of the guide vanes were destroyed, the gas inside the engine could not normally expand and eventually prevented the cooling stage, which was triggered by gas leaving the gas chamber. The absence of cooling then caused the high temperature to melt the guide vanes of the low pressure part of the engine, destroying the lower pressure part. This in turn caused a massive drop in engine rotation speed. Metallurgical analysis on the nozzle guide vanes of the high pressure part revealed that there were fatigue cracks on one of the blades, indicating that a blade had broken off during the take-off. The conclusion was that this was the source of the engine failure.

After the accident, the findings led to the conclusion that an engine failure indeed had occurred aboard the flight. However, the engine failure was actually contained inside the engine itself. The engine cowling did not blow in the outward direction, which would have indicated an uncontained engine failure. In the case of uncontained engine failure, the resulting damage would have caused a significant amount of drag, complicating the aircraft's control and ultimately causing a decay of the aircraft's speed. As the engine failure in Flight 6289 was actually contained, flight control would not have been much compromised. The crew should have been able to return to the airport and conduct an emergency landing with only one working engine.

=== Flight recorders analysis ===
The flight recorders were retrieved from the wreckage on the same day of the accident. The CVR showed few signs of damage, while the FDR was exposed to fire. Both recorders' memory cards were in good condition, allowing a direct readout. On 13 March, the readout was performed by BEA. Due to the old age of the FDR, there were only six recorded parameters: time, pressure altitude, speed, magnetic heading, vertical acceleration, and send/receive VHF communication.

According to the recorders, during the preparation for the flight, First Officer Yousfi had conducted the pre-departure checklist by herself as Captain Benaouicha was running late. He eventually arrived when Yousfi was about to give the pre-flight briefing to the crew members. During the taxiing, the captain could be heard conversing with the chief attendant, who was also in the cockpit, rather than paying attention to the flight operation. There was no discussion on the possible anomaly that might have occurred in-flight, as per the approved Air Algérie procedure.

As the aircraft reached its rotation speed, Captain Benaouicha called for rotation (lift the nose wheel off the ground during takeoff). First Officer Yousfi then asked for gear retraction. A second later, a loud thump was heard, indicating the start of the left engine failure. Startled, the first officer immediately exclaimed the basmala several times, later asking "What's going on?" The captain immediately took over the control and asked Yousfi to let go of the controls. She stated that she had let go and later correctly offered to retract the gear in line with procedures to reduce drag, to which the captain made no response.

First Officer Yousfi immediately reported that Flight 6289 was experiencing a small problem. The aircraft then climbed to a maximum altitude of 398 ft with a speed of 134 knots. The altitude and the speed then dropped and the stick shaker was activated for one second, warning the crew of an impending stall. The speed continued to drop and the aircraft finally entered a full stall. According to engine data it is most likely that Captain Benaouicha reduced power on the working engine after taking control and First Officer Yousfi repeatedly attempted to restore power to it by advancing the thrust lever but each time he pulled it back and instructed her to stop using it, despite her actions being correct. She kept insisting that she had let go. This conflict continued until the end of the recording. At 335 feet (102 m), both recordings abruptly stopped. The last recorded voice was the "Don't sink" alarm from the aircraft's GPWS. The speed was at 126 knots and the landing gear was still in extended position.

=== Failure to fly ===
There were multiple factors that ultimately caused the aircraft's inability to fly safely. Investigators stated that the occurrence of an engine failure during a critical phase of the flight (e.g., during the aircraft's rotation) would have provided the crew with a very limited amount of time to assess the situation. The take-off weight of Flight 6289 at the time was near its maximum allowable take-off weight, causing a reduction in the aircraft's ability to take-off. The location of the airport and the weather condition, which was located at an elevation of 1,300 metres with a typical hot desert temperature at noon, caused the air density to decrease. The reduction in air density resulted in the reduction of the engine output as well. Thus, the aircraft would have needed a higher airspeed to take off from the runway.

However, management of the emergency by the flight crew was the most crucial part for the aircraft to be able to return in a safe manner. If the captain had taken the correct actions for the emergency immediately or listened to the first officer, the aircraft would not have crashed onto the field.

The first sign of crew error was apparent from the initial stage of the flight. Prior to take-off, First Officer Yousfi was about to give the crew members a pre-flight briefing when she was suddenly interrupted by Captain Benaouicha. The captain immediately chatted with the chief flight attendant, and thus the briefing was discontinued. The pre-flight briefing was crucial as this was the exact moment when flight crew were informed on the roles of each crew member and the appropriate procedures that the crew should have taken in case they faced an anomaly during the take-off. The interrupted briefing indicated the crew's failure to emphasise the importance of flight safety in regards to the possible anomalies that might be encountered during a critical phase of the flight.

Benaouicha kept talking to the chief flight attendant even during the aircraft's taxi. This was a breach of the sterile cockpit rule, which prohibited flight crew from engaging in conversations unrelated to the flight during critical phases. During the entire conversation, nothing was said regarding a possible anomaly on take-off.

During the aircraft's rotation, the engine suddenly malfunctioned. Benaouicha, without hesitation, immediately initiated a switching of roles from pilot not flying (PNF) to pilot flying (PF). His previous role required him to scan the instruments so that the flight crew could understand the exact cause of the emergency. As he was not a PNF any more, his duty to monitor the aircraft's instruments was immediately handed over to the first officer, who had been at the controls for the entire time prior to the role switch. Why he chose to switch his role as a PF was unclear. Both flight crew had not agreed to switch roles in case of a flight emergency, leading the first officer to be confused by the captain's decision.

As his tasks were immediately transferred to the first officer, the captain could not fully understand the situation at the time. While he was taking over the control, he repeatedly asked the first officer to let go of the thrust lever. The first officer was unsure of her flight role due to the sudden role switch. This was indicated by the recording.

The sudden switch also created a sudden increase of stress for the captain. Overwhelmed, the captain was only focusing on the pitch attitude of the aircraft. He maintained an excessive angle of attack during the entire emergency. His decision was probably influenced by the rocky environment of the airport, which would have made it impossible for the crew to conduct an emergency landing.

The landing gear was still in the extended position. During an engine failure on take-off, the crew should have immediately retracted it as leaving it extended would have caused a progressive decline of airspeed. It was the PF's duty to retract the landing gear. Just one second prior to the engine failure, First Officer Yousfi was the PF and she had actually requested the captain to retract the landing gear. However, when the captain switched roles immediately, it was then up to him to request a gear retraction. During the emergency, Yousfi had offered to retract the landing gear. As Benaouicha was preoccupied with the emergency, he did not reply to the first officer's offer. The gear remained in the extended position and the aircraft stayed in its high pitch attitude, diminishing its ability to fly and ultimately causing it to crash.

=== Conclusion ===
The final report was published with the following:

The accident was caused by the loss of an engine during a critical phase of flight, the non-retraction of the landing gear after the engine failure, and the captain, the PNF, taking over control of the airplane before having clearly identified the problem.

The following factors probably contributed to the accident:

- the perfunctory flight preparation by the Captain, which meant that the crew were not equipped to face the situation that occurred at a critical moment of the flight;
- the coincidence between the moment the failure occurred and the request to retract the landing gear;
- the speed of the event that left the crew little time to recover the situation;
- the Captain choosing to take command rather than diagnosing the issue, leading to the crew swapping roles at a critical moment;
- maintaining an inappropriate rate of climb, taking into account the failure of one engine;
- the absence of any teamwork after the engine failure, which led to a failure to detect and correct parameters related to the conduct of the flight (speed, rate of climb, configuration, etc.);
- the takeoff weight being close to the maximum with a high aerodrome altitude and high temperature;
- the rocky environment around the aerodrome, unsuitable for an emergency landing.

— BEA

On 6 March 2003, the temperature at the airport was 23 °C (73 °F). The airport's elevation is 1,377 metres (4,518 ft) above sea level. The aircraft weighed 48,708 kilograms (107,383 lb), below its maximum authorised weight of 49,500 kilograms (109,100 lb).

Following the crash, investigators asked Air Algérie to ensure that their cockpit resource management (CRM) training effectively heighten flight crew awareness on the strict respect of following the procedures of the appropriate hand-over and task-sharing. Other recommendations were also issued to the Algerian government.

== Aftermath ==
Crisis centres were immediately set up in Algiers and Paris. Government officials, including Interior Minister Moureddine Yazid Zerhouni and Transport Minister Abdelmalek Sellal, visited Tamanrasset to observe the crash site. A repatriation ceremony for the six French victims was held in Algiers. At least two of the victims were sent to Marseille while the other four were flown to Paris.

Officials agreed to build a monument for the victims of the crash. A monument was later erected near the crash site of Flight 6289. Multiple events were also held to commemorate the victims of the crash. In the nearby Ben Messaoud sports complex in Iméchouène, multiple mini-tournaments were held for the residents in the area. Special sponsorship would also be given to Mouloudia d'Adriane, the football club that lost 14 members of the team in the crash. Minister of Youth and Sports El Hadi Ould Ali stated that "The state does not forget its children and full support will be given to the club so that it can return to the sports scene". After the crash, the football club worked hard to promote multiple sport activities in Tamanrasset.

In response to the crash, investigators issued a recommendation for the Algerian government to create an independent investigative body for aircraft accidents in the country. However, this recommendation was not enacted and as of 2024 there is still no independent aircraft accident investigation commission in Algeria.

== In popular culture ==
The crash was featured in season 26, episode 7 of the Canadian documentary series Mayday, also known as Air Crash Investigation, titled "Divided in Crisis". This clarified the captain's failures in preparation, keeping a sterile cockpit, inappropriately taking control rather than diagnosing the situation, and refusing to allow the first officer to take corrective action. There is a suggestion that the captain's refusal to allow the first officer to take the necessary corrective action may have been due to misogyny.

== See also ==
- Centurion Air Cargo Flight 164
- List of aviation accidents and incidents with a sole survivor
- Midwest Express Airlines Flight 105
- LOT Polish Airlines Flight 7
- LOT Polish Airlines Flight 5055
- United Airlines Flight 232
