= Aguenar – Hadj Bey Akhamok Airport =

Domestic airport in Tamanrasset, Algeria

Aguenar – Hadj Bey Akhamok Airport Aéroport de Tamanrasset / Aguenar – Hadj Bey Akhamok
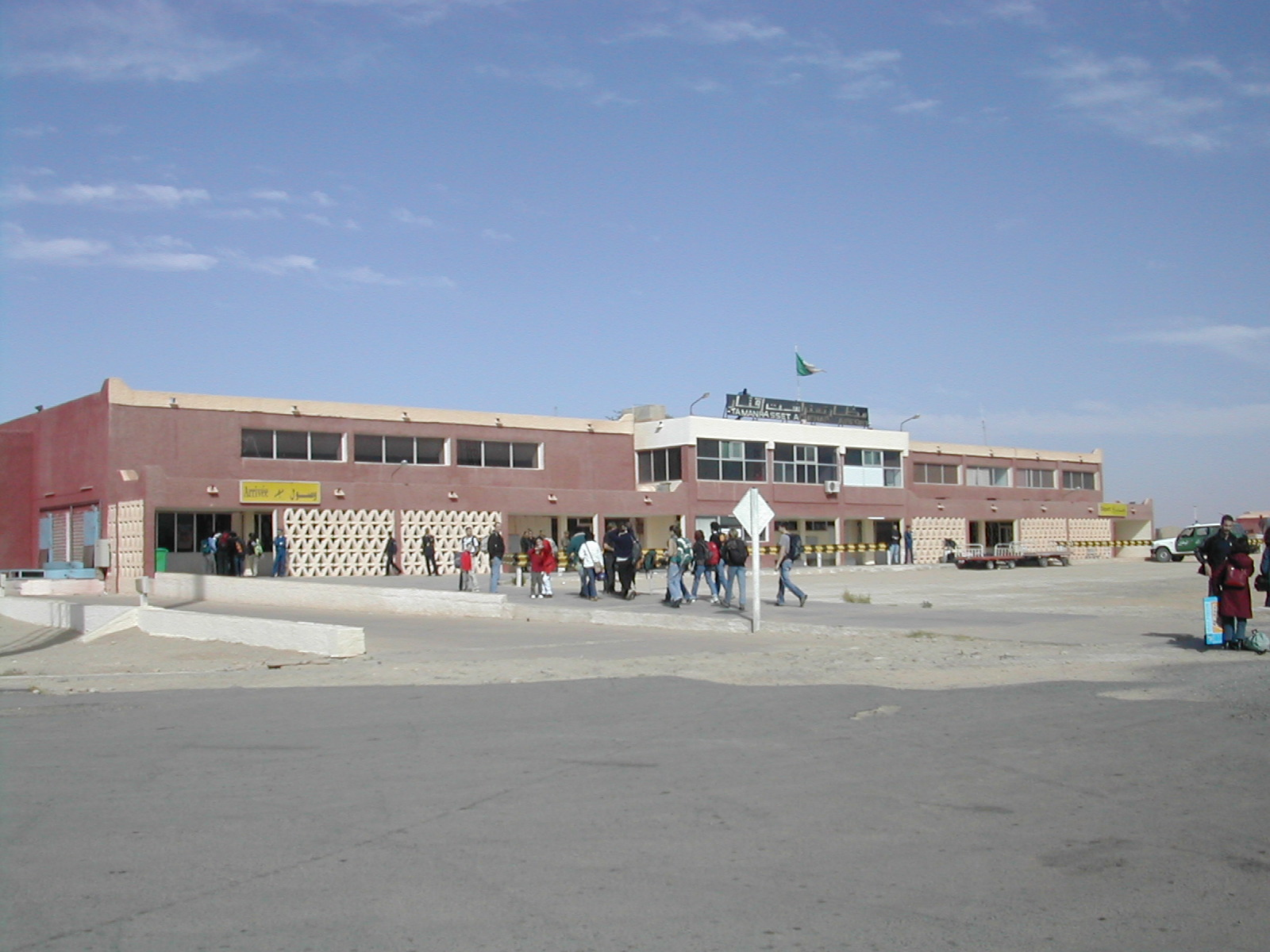
- IATA: TMR; ICAO: DAAT,

Summary
- Airport type: Public
- Operator: EGSA Alger
- Serves: Tamanrasset, Algeria
- Elevation AMSL: 1,377 m / 4,518 ft
- Coordinates: 22°48′40″N 05°27′03″E

Map
- Location of airport in Algeria

Runways
Direction	Length		Surface
Direction	m	ft	Surface
02/20	3,600	11,800	Asphalt
08/26	3,100	10,170	Asphalt

Statistics (2010)
- Passengers: 70,515
- Passenger change 09–10: ▲4.1%
- Aircraft movements: 2,402
- Movements change 09–10: ▼3.8%
- Sources: AIP, EGSA Alger, DAFIF Landings.com

Aguenar – Hadj Bey Akhamok Airport (French: Aéroport de Tamanrasset / Aguenar – Hadj Bey Akhamok) (IATA: TMR, ICAO: DAAT), also known as Aguenar Airport or Tamanrasset Airport, is an airport serving Tamanrasset, a city in the Tamanrasset Province of southern Algeria. It is located 3.6 nautical miles (4.1 mi; 6.7 km) northwest of the city.

== Airlines and destinations ==
Airlines	Destinations
Air Algérie	Algiers, Bordj Badji Mokhtar, El Golea, Ghardaia, Illizi, In Guezzam, In Salah, Oran, Ouargla
Tassili Airlines	Algiers, In Salah

== Military and government use ==
The Algerian Air Force is the primary military user of the airport with several units maintaining a presence at the field. In the mid-2000s, it was extensively upgraded to serve additionally as a military base, with 10 hardened aircraft shelters, aprons, personnel accommodation and other facilities. The most potent military aircraft based at Tamanrasset are the Sukhoi Su-30MK multi-role fighter aircraft operated by the 123rd Air Defense Squadron which provide fighter coverage for much of southern Algeria. A reconnaissance unit equipped with Beechcraft 1900HISAR and 350ER aircraft specially equipped with surveillance equipment operates from the base along with helicopter detachments operating Mil Mi-171Sh, Mi-24 Mk.III and Mi-26T2 helicopters to support the ground forces in the region.

The airport has been used for American military operations.

== Statistics ==
Traffic by calendar year. Official ACI Statistics
	Passengers	Change from previous year	Aircraft operations	Change from previous year	Cargo (metric tons)	Change from previous year
2005	57,601	▼24.58%	2,474	▼23.99%	151	▼50.97%
2006	55,826	▼3.08%	2,729	▲10.31%	182	▲20.53%
2007	49,838	▼10.73%	2,647	▼3.00%	194	▲6.59%
2008	59,116	▲18.62%	2,593	▼2.04%	151	▼22.16%
2009	67,770	▲14.64%	2,496	▼3.74%	141	▼6.62%
2010	70,515	▲4.05%	2,402	▼3.77%	149	▲5.67%
Source: Airports Council International. World Airport Traffic Reports (Years 2005, 2006, 2007, 2009 and 2010)

== Incidents and accidents ==
- On 8 February 1978, Douglas C-49J N189UM of Aero Service Corporation was damaged beyond repair in a landing accident at Tamanrasset.
- On 18 September 1994, an Oriental Airlines charter flight returning Nigerian football team Iwuanyanwu Nationale FC home from their CAF Cup quarterfinal football match against Esperance de Tunis crashed while landing at the airport, killing three crew and two passengers, defender Aimola Omale and goalkeeper Uche Ikeogu.
- On 6 March 2003, Air Algérie Flight 6289 crashed at 3:45 pm local time (1445 GMT). The flight was leaving Tamanrasset bound for Algiers with the co-pilot acting as pilot-in-command. At a height of 78 feet and a speed of 158 kts, the No. 1 engine suffered a turbine failure. The captain took control. The co-pilot asked if she should raise the gear, but the captain did not respond. The Boeing 737-200 lost speed, stalled, and broke up on rocky terrain about 1600 metres past the runway. The accident was caused by the loss of an engine during a critical phase of flight, the non-retraction of the landing gear after the engine failure, and the Captain taking over control of the airplane before having clearly identified the problem. There were 102 fatalities and one survivor.
- On 31 March 2025, malian Akinci and Mig-29 incident.
