= El Golea Airport =

- IATA: ELG; ICAO: DAUE

Summary
- Airport type: Public
- Serves: El Menia, Algeria
- Elevation AMSL: 398 m (1,306 ft)
- Coordinates: 30°34′39″N 2°51′51″E

Map
- Location of airport in Algeria

Runways
Direction	Length		Surface
Direction	m	ft	Surface
18/36	3,500	11,482	Asphalt
10/28	1,800	5,906	Asphalt
- Sources: Algerian AIP, Landings.com

El Golea Airport (IATA: ELG, ICAO: DAUE) is an airport in El Menia, Algeria.

== Airlines and destinations ==
The only airline operating regular flights to/from the airport is Air Algérie, serving the following destinations

Airlines	Destinations
Air Algérie	Algiers, Ouargla, Tamanrasset
Domestic Airlines	Algiers
