= Sidi Mahdi Airport =

Sidi Mahdi Sidi Mahdi Airport
- IATA: TGR; ICAO: DAUK

Summary
- Airport type: Public
- Operator: EGSA Alger
- Serves: Touggourt, Algeria
- Elevation AMSL: 85 m (279 ft)
- Coordinates: 33°4′10″N 6°5′20″E

Map
- Location of airport in Algeria

Runways
Direction	Length		Surface
Direction	m	ft	Surface
01/19	3,000	9,843	Asphalt
- Source: DAFIF Landings.com

Sidi Mahdi Airport (IATA: TGR, ICAO: DAUK) is an airport serving Touggourt, a city in the Ouargla Province of eastern Algeria.

== Airlines and destinations ==
Airlines	Destinations
Air Algérie	Algiers, Bou Saada
