= Noumérat – Moufdi Zakaria Airport =

Noumérat – Moufdi Zakaria Airport Aéroport de Ghardaïa / Noumérat – Moufdi Zakaria مطار غرداية – نوميرات مفدي زكريا
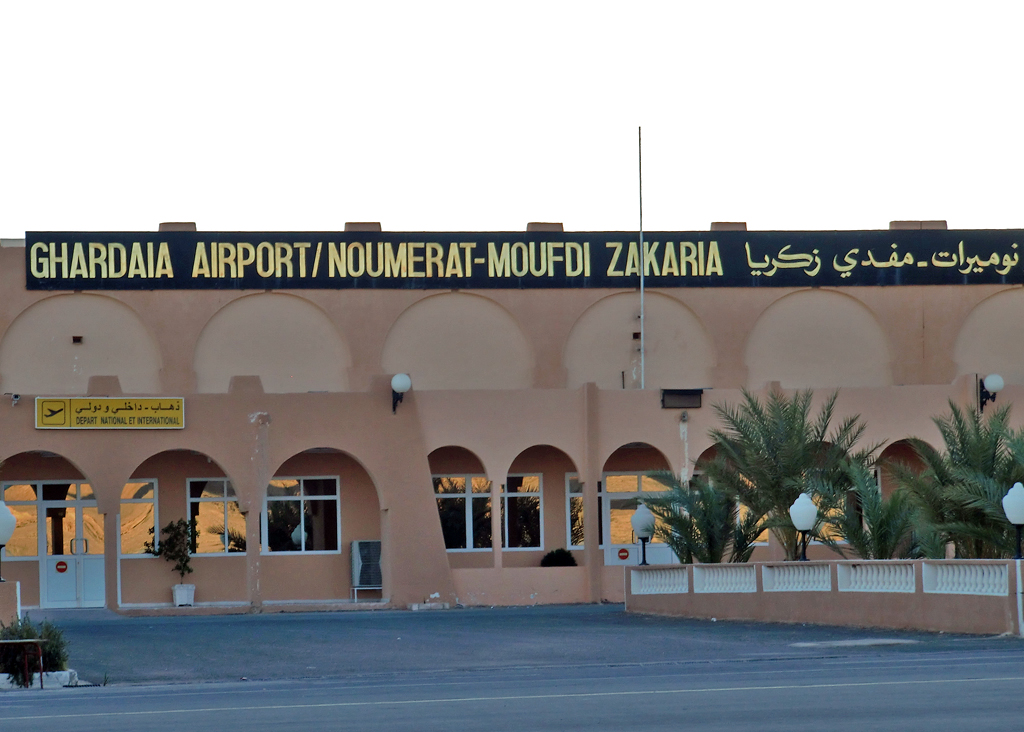
- IATA: GHA; ICAO: DAUG

Summary
- Airport type: Public
- Operator: EGSA Alger
- Serves: Ghardaïa, Algeria
- Elevation AMSL: 461 m / 1,512 ft
- Coordinates: 32°23′0″N 3°47′50″E

Map
- Location of airport in Algeria

Runways
Direction	Length		Surface
Direction	m	ft	Surface
12/30	3,100	10,171	Asphalt
18/36	2,400	7,874	Asphalt

Statistics (2010)
- Passengers: 45,794
- Passenger change 09–10: ▼2.9%
- Aircraft movements: 2,436
- Movements change 09–10: ▼4.17%
- Sources: AIP, EGSA Alger, DAFIF Landings.com, ACI's 2010 World Airport Traffic Report.

Noumérat – Moufdi Zakaria Airport (French: Aéroport de Ghardaïa / Noumérat – Moufdi Zakaria, Arabic: مطار غرداية – نوميرات مفدي زكريا IATA: GHA, ICAO: DAUG), also known as Noumerate Airport, is a public airport serving Ghardaïa, the capital of the Ghardaïa Province in Algeria. It is located 8.6 nautical miles (9.9 mi; 15.9 km) southeast of the city. The airport is named for Moufdi Zakaria (1908–1977), the author of Kassaman, the Algerian national anthem.

== Terminal project ==
The terminal, with an annual capacity of 500,000 passengers, is often considered as outdated and under-equipped.

== Airlines and destinations ==
Airlines	Destinations
Air Algérie	Adrar, Algiers, Constantine, Illizi, Oran, Tamanrasset

== Statistics ==
Traffic by calendar year. Official ACI Statistics
	Passengers	Change from previous year	Aircraft operations	Change from previous year	Cargo (metric tons)	Change from previous year
2005	47,217	▼36.70%	3,140	▼34.45%	51	▼78.30%
2006	40,699	▼13.80%	2,330	▼25.80%	106	▲107.84%
2007	36,226	▼10.99%	2,121	▼8.97%	34	▼67.92%
2008	44,762	▲23.56%	2,352	▲10.89%	129	▲279.41%
2009	44,493	▼0.60%	2,542	▲8.08%	57	▼55.81%
2010	45,794	▲2.92%	2,436	▼4.17%	601	▲954.39%
Source: Airports Council International. World Airport Traffic Reports (Years 2005, 2006, 2007, 2009 and 2010)

== Incidents ==
- On 28 January 2004 at 21:00 the flight 7T-VIN of Tassili Airlines. The Sonatrach company chartered one of Tassili Airlines Beechcraft 1900D planes to fly two employees from the oil fields near the Algerian Sahara town of Hassi R'Mel to Ghardaia. The Beech took off at 20:36 and arrived near Ghardaia twenty minutes later. The pilot carried out a visual approach to the field, but had to go around because another plane which had just arrived from Djanet, was still on the runway. While maneuvering for another approach, the plane contacted the ground and right wing was torn off. The five occupants survived the impact, but the co-pilot died a day later of his injuries. 2 fatalities.
- On 6 February 2010 at 04:48, a Ghana International Airlines Boeing 757 flying from Accra, Ghana to London Gatwick, United Kingdom with 125 passengers and 8 crew made a precautionary landing at Moufdi Zakaria Airport following indications of possible irregularities with the hydraulics system. A relief aircraft was organised to convey passengers to London while the aircraft was inspected and returned to service by a technical team.
- On 1 March 2021 at 20:00, Air Algérie flight AH6200, an ATR 72, suffered a nose landing gear issue on landing at Ghardaïa Airport, Algeria. During the approach to Ghardaïa after a flight from Algiers, the nose landing gear failed to deploy after the flight crew selected the undercarriage down. The flight crew failed to resolve the issue and performed a nosegear-up landing with fire trucks and ambulances standing by.
