= Ministry of Public Works and Transport (Algeria) =

Government ministry of Algeria

Agency overview
- Formed: 1962
- Agency executive: Saïd Sayoud
- Website: https://portail.mtpt.gov.dz

The Ministry of Public Works and Transport (French: Ministère des Travaux Publics et des Transports), formerly the Transport Ministry (Arabic: وزارة اﻟﻨﻘﻞ, French: Ministère des Transports) is a government ministry of Algeria. Its head office is in El Biar, Algiers.

The Directorate of Civil Aviation and Meteorology (DACM, French: Direction de l'Aviation Civile et de la météorologie) serves as the civil aviation authority and the authority for investigation of accidents and incidents.

The Direction of the Merchant Navy (French: Direction de La Marine Marchande) investigates maritime accidents and incidents.

There is also a commission of inquiry on rail accidents (administrative commission of inquiry into railway accidents and incidents, French: commission d'enquête administrative en matière d'accident et d'incident ferroviaires).

== Investigations of air accidents ==
- Air Algérie Flight 6289
