= In Guezzam Airport =

In Guezzam Airport مطار عين قزام
- IATA: INF; ICAO: DATG

Summary
- Serves: In Guezzam, Algeria
- Elevation AMSL: 404 m / 1,325 ft
- Coordinates: 19°33′38″N 5°45′00″E

Map
- Location of airport in Algeria

Runways
| Direction | Length | | Surface |
| Direction | m | ft | Surface |
|---|---|---|---|
| 08/26 | 2,200 | 7,218 | Asphalt |
- Source: Algerian AIP Landings.com

In Guezzam Airport (Arabic: مطار عين قزام, French: Aéroport National d’In Guezzam, IATA: INF, ICAO: DATG) is an airport near In Guezzam, Algeria. It is not open for public use.

== Airline and destination ==
| Airlines | Destinations |
|---|---|
| Air Algérie | Tamanrasset |
