= In Salah Airport =

- IATA: INZ; ICAO: DAUI

Summary
- Airport type: Public
- Operator: EGSA
- Serves: In Salah, Algeria
- Elevation AMSL: 273 m (896 ft)
- Coordinates: 27°15′2″N 2°30′41″E

Map
- Location of airport in Algeria

Runways
Direction	Length		Surface
Direction	m	ft	Surface
05/23	3,000	9,843	Asphalt
- Source: Algerian AIP Landings.com

In Salah Airport is an airport in In Salah, Algeria (IATA: INZ, ICAO: DAUI).

== Airlines and destinations ==
The only airline operating regular flights is Air Algérie. It connects the airport with two domestic destinations, as follows:
