= List of accidents and incidents involving military aircraft (2010–2019) =

This is a list of accidents and incidents involving military aircraft grouped by the year in which the accident or incident occurred. Not all of the aircraft were in operation at the time. Combat losses are not included except for a very few cases denoted by singular circumstances.

== Aircraft terminology ==
Information on aircraft gives the type, and if available, the serial number of the operator in italics, the constructors number, also known as the manufacturer's serial number (c/n), exterior codes in apostrophes, nicknames (if any) in quotation marks, flight callsign in italics, and operating units.

For this list, the criteria used for a military aircraft will be: any fixed-wing or rotary-wing aircraft that is operated by a governmental organization such as United States Department of Defense or British Armed Forces in either combat or non-combat missions. The aircraft will fall into categories such as fighter, bomber, attack, search and rescue, transport or training.

== 2010 ==
=== January ===
13 January
A Yemeni Air Force Aero L-39 Albatros training aircraft crashed in the area of Salah al-Din, west of the port city of Aden due to a technical problem. The pilot survived.

14 January
Russian Air Force Sukhoi Su-27SM Flanker-B Mod. 1, 86 red, c/n 36911030105, of the 23rd Interceptor Aviation Regiment, crashed near Komsomolsk-on-Amur during a training mission. Pilot Col. Vladimir Sobolev was killed.

14 January
Royal New Zealand Air Force (RNZAF) PAC CT/4E Airtrainer, NZ1990, c/n 205, crashed near RNZAF Base Ohakea, New Zealand while performing routine aerobatic training. The pilot, Sqn Ldr Nick Cree, was killed. The pilot was performing an aerobatic maneuver known as the "fishtail pass" at 58 knots when he lost control.

21 January
A Maritime Safety and Rescue Society AgustaWestland AW139 helicopter, EC-KYR, c/n 31228, crashed into the sea off Almería while returning from SAR winch training. Only the winch operator survived. An optical illusion led to misconception of the aircraft's altitude.

21 January
Finnish Air Force McDonnell Douglas F-18D Hornet, HN-468, crashed in Juupajoki, north of the southern city of Tampere at about 11:50 local time. The two pilots ejected successfully but received fractures and bruises due to the high speed of the aircraft at the time of ejection. The pilots were conducting flight tests of a previously damaged and rebuilt F-18. The crash was attributed to mechanical failure of the horizontal stabilizer actuation servo.

22 January
A Myanmar Air Force Chengdu F-7 fighter crashed while attempting to land at Yangon airport, killing its pilot.

23 January
United States Navy Beechcraft T-34C Turbo-Mentor, BuNo 161047, of Training Air Wing 5, crashed in Lake Pontchartrain near New Orleans. One pilot was rescued and the other was declared missing. The plane, on a routine nighttime instrument training mission, crashed about 1845 hrs. and was 1 nautical mile (1.9 km) north of Lakefront Airport in New Orleans on an apparent approach to land. Coast Guard teams rescued the trainee pilot, who had mild hypothermia and moderate injuries, from the 57 °F (14 °C) water around 9 p.m.. The missing trainer-pilot, Lt. Clinton Wermers, 33, from Mitchell, South Dakota, was presumed dead. He had been assigned to Naval Air Station Whiting Field as from March 2007. A memorial service was held for Lt. Wermers on 1 February at Whiting Field.

26 January
A Nigerian Navy AgustaWestland A109E Power helicopter, 06, crashed into a swamp at Ikwerre, near Port Harcourt in south Nigeria. The accident happened at about 01:30 p.m. (1330 GMT) when the helicopter was returning from a routine patrol of Port Harcourt area in the Niger-Delta region. Four persons were killed.

=== February ===
USAF Northrop Grumman B-2 Spirit, 88-0332, "Spirit of Washington", caught fire on the ground at Andersen AFB. The damaged aircraft underwent 18 months of repairs in order to enable it to fly back to the mainland for more comprehensive repairs and was returned to service in December 2013.

3 February
United States Army Sikorsky UH-60A Black Hawk, 87-24261, c/n 70–1149, crashed northeast of Mannheim, Germany around 1800 hrs. local time, killing three persons on board. "The crew of the ill-fated UH-60 flight was conducting routine pilot proficiency training from Stuttgart Army Airfield to Coleman Army Airfield in Mannheim. USAREUR officials stated that, during the approach to Coleman, the aircraft began a rapid descent and made contact with the trees. At the time of the crash, it was raining heavily and visibility below the clouds was about 1 mile [2 km], according to a German weather service spokesman." KWF were Warrant Officer 3 Gary M. Farwell, 39; Chief Warrant Officer 2 Clayton M. Hickman, 32; and Cpl. Matthew E. Clark, 25. All three were assigned to the Stuttgart-based Company G, 52nd Regiment, 1st Battalion, 214th Aviation Regiment, 12th Combat Aviation Brigade. A U.S. Army investigation, 15–6, was unable to determine a cause. "There was insufficient evidence to indicate that mechanical malfunction, environmental factors, pilot error or a combination of these factors contributed to the accident," according to a U.S. Army Europe news release issued on the evening of Monday, 2 August 2010.

5 February
A Brazilian Air Force (FAB) Bell UH-1H Iroquois helicopter crashed in Campo Grande.

9 February
A Pakistan Air Force (PAF) Bell AH-1 Cobra gunship helicopter crashed in the Teera Valley in Pakistan's Khyber tribal area near the Afghanistan's border. Both the pilot and gunner died in the incident.

10 February
A Brazilian Army Eurocopter AS350 Écureuil helicopter crashed while training tactical piloting maneuvering at Sao Pedro da Aldeia naval base, about 130 kilometers (81 mi) away from Rio de Janeiro city.

11 February
An Italian Air Force (ItAF) General Dynamics F-16A Fighting Falcon from 5th Fighter Wing crashed into the Adriatic Sea 3 nautical miles (5.6 km) from the coast near Ravenna at 1530 hrs. while training with another aircraft of the same unit. The pilot survived.

14 February
A Yemeni Air Force (YemAF) Mil Mi-17 Helicopter crashed in the Kahlan district, east of the provincial capital Sa'ana, as the result of a technical fault. The helicopter's four-man crew and the seven wounded soldiers whom they were evacuating all died, as did two soldiers in a military vehicle that the aircraft crashed into.

16 February
An Indian Air Force (IAF) Mikoyan-Gurevich MiG-27 fighter-bomber went down near Siliguri in West Bengal killing the pilot, a squadron leader.

18 February
A US Navy Sikorsky MH-60S Seahawk helicopter crashed in West Virginia outside of Lewisburg. Passengers and crew sustained unspecified injuries, none of which were life-threatening.

18 February
An IAF Mikoyan-Gurevich MiG-21 fighter jet (8th Squadron, 20th Wing) crashed soon after take-off from Bagdora in West Bengal; the pilot ejected successfully.

21 February
A United States Army Bell OH-58 Kiowa helicopter made a hard landing in northern Iraq, killing the two pilots on board.

24 February
A Fuerza Aérea Mexicana (FAM) Cessna 182S Skylane crashed during takeoff near San Diego de Alcalá, Chihuahua, resulting in injuries to three occupants and two fatalities.

24 February
A Philippine Air Force (PhilAF) North American OV-10 Bronco crashed at 1455 hrs, during a training flight. Two Philippine Air Force pilots were killed.

25 February
A USAF General Dynamics F-16C Fighting Falcon crashed during landing at Osan Air Base, South Korea. The plane became uncontrollable and the pilot bailed out safely. The jet was heavily damaged and crashed within Osan's boundaries.

=== March ===
2 March
A Republic of Korea Air Force (RoKAF) Northrop F-5E and Northrop F-5F crashed into Mount Hwangbyeong, about 20 kilometers (12 mi) west of the city of Gangneung, Gangwon. The pilot of the F-5E and the two pilots of the F-5F were killed.

3 March
An Indian Navy HAL Kiran Mk.II crashed into a building in Hyderabad during the "India Aviation 2010" air show/exhibition. Both pilots aboard and a civilian on the ground were killed. At least five other civilians also received injuries.

3 March
A Republic of Korea Army MD Helicopters MD 500 helicopter crashed 20 km east of the capital Seoul, at around 2014 hrs. The craft hit a greenhouse in a rice paddy-field in Namyangju. The two crew members were rushed to a hospital but were later confirmed dead.

3 March
A United States Coast Guard (USCG) Sikorsky MH-60T helicopter, (an upgraded Sikorsky HH-60 Jayhawk), crashed in the remote Utah mountains. It was one of two traveling through the area en route to its home base in Elizabeth City, North Carolina, after performing security duty at the Vancouver Winter Olympic Games. The helicopters made a refueling stop in Salt Lake City and were headed to Leadville, Colorado, when the crash occurred about 50 miles (80 km) east of Salt Lake City. Three crewmen were airlifted to local hospitals and two others sustained minor injuries.

10 March
A Brazilian Army Eurocopter Fennec helicopter crashed during a night training flight during Operation Caburé. All four crew members died.

10 March
United States Marine Corps (USMC) McDonnell-Douglas F/A-18D Hornet, BuNo 164694, 'WK-01', from VMFA (AW)-224 crashes into the Atlantic Ocean, app. 35 miles (56 km) east of Saint Helena Sound, South Carolina, after a double engine failure and a fire. Both pilots ejected and were floating in an inflatable life raft for about one hour before they were rescued by a USCG helicopter.

11 March
A Mil Mi-8 helicopter of the Ministry of Emergency Situations of Azerbaijan Republic crashed for unknown reasons during a rescue flight in a blizzard.

18 March
Two USN Boeing F/A-18E Super Hornet fighters from VFA-122 collided in mid-air at 2200 hrs., sending one crashing to the Nevada desert. One pilot ejected safely before his aircraft crashed near Naval Air Station Fallon and a second pilot landed the single-seat jet safely at Fallon.

19 March
A Turkish Army TAI/AgustaWestland T129 (registration CSX81723) helicopter prototype lost its tail rotor at 15,000 ft (4,600 m). height at 16:30. Two people on board survived.

23 March
A Turkish Army Sikorsky UH-60 Black Hawk came down on the outskirts of Wardak town in Afghanistan at around 10:30. The crash happened as two Turkish helicopters were attempting to land at a Turkish-run Provincial Reconstruction Team.

23 March
Two Royal Air Force (RAF) Red Arrows BAE Systems Hawks, collided during a full display practice at Heraklion Crete. The pilot of one plane ejected and received moderate injuries. The aircraft crashed onto the airfield and was destroyed. The second aircraft landed safely at Heraklion Airport.

25 March
A Royal Malaysian Air Force (RMAF) Pilatus PC-7 crashed during an airshow near a local university campus. The pilot bailed out at low altitude but was killed.

25 March
A Chilean Army MD Helicopters 530F suffered an engine failure and crashed shortly following takeoff, after disembarking a passenger. The helicopter was on a mission in a region that had been badly damaged during the most recent earthquake. All four crew members were taken to hospital, three of them with serious injuries.

29 March
A US Army Sikorsky UH-60 Black Hawk helicopter crashed at Forward Operating Base Atgar in the Zabul province of Afghanistan.

31 March
A USN Grumman E-2C Hawkeye from Carrier Airborne Early Warning Squadron 121 crashed at approximately 1400 hrs. local time in the Arabian Sea. It was returning to its ship, the USS Eisenhower, after conducting operations in support of Operation Enduring Freedom when it experienced mechanical malfunctions and the crew performed a controlled bailout. The pilot was killed. Navy 5th Fleet officials declined to speculate on the cause of the crash, but the Naval Safety Center's Web site listed it as "an engine oil leak."

=== April ===
2 April
A Brazilian Air Force (FAB) Embraer EMB 312 Tucano from the "Smoke Squadron" aerobatic team crashed during an air show at Aeroporto Federal de Lages in Lages, Santa Catarina, Brazil. The pilot, aged 33, died in the crash.

8 April
A Pakistan Army MFI-17 Mushshak crashed in an open field in the Nelavia area, near Peshawar's suburbs of Tagman.

8 April
An Armée de l'Air (AdlA) Dassault Mirage F1 conducting basic training crashed about 1140 hrs. in a field near a highway, four miles (6.4 km) from the base of Orléans.

9 April
A USAF Bell-Boeing CV-22 Osprey crashed near Qalat, Zabul Province, killing four. This was the first combat loss of an Osprey.

10 April

A Polish Air Force VIP transport Tupolev Tu-154M aircraft, 101, from the 36th Special Aviation Regiment hit trees as it approached Smolensk North Airport in thick fog. The Polish President Lech Kaczyński, Poland's army chief, central bank governor, MPs and leading historians were among more than its 80 passengers who died.

12 April
A USN North American Rockwell T-39N Sabreliner crashed in Morganton killing all four crew on board.

13 April
An AdlA Dassault/Dornier Alpha Jet, E122/F-TERD, of the Patrouille de France crashed near Plan de Dieu Airport (LF51), Vaucluse area. The pilot ejected and escaped with minor injuries.

15 April
A South Korean Navy Westland Lynx helicopter was on a routine patrol mission when it crashed in the sea near Chuja Island 14.5 km southeast of Jindo, South Jeolla Province. One occupant was killed and three others were declared missing.

16 April
An Ejército del Aire (EjdA) Bell 212 crashed in Haiti near the border with the Dominican Republic, killing all four crew on board.

17 April
A US Army Sikorsky UH-60 Black Hawk helicopter crashed in the Al-Mahzam area, about 12 miles (19 km) north of Tikrit, Iraq. One soldier was killed.

20 April
While performing maneuvers, a Vertical de Aviación Bell 222UT helicopter, registered HK-3262, and a Fuerza Aérea de Colombia (FAC) MD Helicopters MD530 crashed on a military garrison near Chaparral, Tolima, Colombia.

20 April
A United States Coast Guard (USCG) Eurocopter HH-65 Dolphin crashed into Lake Huron nine miles (14 km) north of Port Huron, Michigan.

21 April
Two Belarusian Air Force (BelAF) Mikoyan MiG-29 fighters collided during a training flight. There were no casualties; one MiG-29 landed safely, while the pilot of the second plane ejected before it crashed.

25 April
A Royal New Zealand Air Force (RNZAF) Bell UH-1H Iroquois crashed in heavy fog about 40 km north east of Wellington. Three persons were killed and a fourth seriously injured.

=== May ===
2 May
A US Army Boeing AH-64 Apache helicopter carrying two soldiers of the 116th Aviation Group was participating in a routine drill when it crashed on a ramp while taxiing at McEntire Joint National Guard Base, South Carolina, shortly before 1400 hrs. Both crew members were taken to hospital. Pilot 1st Lt. Jonathan Shively Jr, 33, of Jamestown, died of injuries, but second pilot, Chief Warrant Officer Roger Carpenter, 46, of Spartanburg, was in stable condition.

10 May
A US Army Sikorsky UH-60 Black Hawk helicopter made a controlled landing after being hit by enemy fire in Helmand Province. All crew members were safely returned to base. Helicopter was intentionally destroyed by international forces.

10 May
USAF Fairchild Republic A-10 Thunderbolt II s/n 79-0141, of 23rd Wing 75th Fighter Squadron, crashed during takeoff at Moody Air Force Base, Georgia. The pilot ejected safely.

11 May
An AdlA Dassault Mirage 2000 crashed in the Foret de Bougue close to Villeneuve-de-Marsan (Landes, Aquitaine), 6 km east of Mont de Marsan AB (LFBM), after technical problems. The pilot ejected safely and received only minor injuries.
12 May
After taking off from the base at Rimini, an Italian Air Force NH 500 helicopter of 15º Stormo (83º Centro CSAR) flew about fifty feet above the ground when the engine suddenly failed. The helicopter autorotated to impact. Both occupants escaped unhurt.

21 May
A USN Lockheed P-3 Orion accidentally released a sonobuoy shortly after departure from NAS Jacksonville, Florida, which fell 500 feet (150 m) and crashed through the roof of a home in Mandarin, Florida, coming to rest in a bedroom next to a bed. Resident Marwan Saman said his daughter had just got out of bed about half an hour earlier. The Navy sent an explosives demolition team to retrieve the 3-foot-long (0.91 m), 40-pound (18 kg) cylinder. No injuries were reported, and the Navy was making arrangements to pay for the damage. A malfunctioning launch tube was theorized for the drop.

=== June ===
24 June
Indonesian Air Force KAI KT-1B Woongbi LD-0102 crashed at Ngurah Rai International Airport in Bali. The pilot and a passenger ejected safely.

=== July ===
7 July
A US Coast Guard Sikorsky HH-60 Jayhawk crashed off of La Push, Washington, apparently after clipping power lines killing its three occupants.

19 July
A Philippine Air Force SIAI S-211, 09005, crashed during a training flight in the Philippines. The crew ejected safely.

23 July
A Royal Canadian Air Force (RCAF) McDonnell-Douglas CF-18 Hornet, 188738, of 425 Squadron "Alouettes", based at 3 Wing Bagotville crashed at Lethbridge County Airport during a low-speed, low-altitude practice run for the Alberta International Airshow. The pilot, Capt. Brian Bews, 36, ejected seconds before the starboard wing impacted the airfield, and sustained a compression fracture in three vertebrae.

26 July

An Israeli Air Force (IDF/AF) Sikorsky CH-53 Sea Stallion helicopter crashed during a joint Israeli-Romanian aviation exercise in the Carpathian Mountains in northern Romania, killing six IAF officers and one Romanian Air Force officer.

28 July

USAF Boeing C-17A Lot XII Globemaster III, 00-0173, c/n P-73, "Spirit of the Aleutians", callsign Sitka 43, of the 3d Wing, on a training mission, crashed at ≈1822 hrs into a wooded area on Elmendorf Air Force Base in Anchorage, Alaska, killing three members of the Alaska Air National Guard and one member of the US Air Force. The cause of the accident was almost immediately investigated. This was apparently the first C-17 accident to result in the loss of life. The crash damaged tracks of the Alaska Railroad, which temporarily suspended operations in the area of the accident. The aircraft departed Runway 06 to practice maneuvers for the upcoming 30 July 2010 Arctic Thunder Airshow at Joint Base Elmendorf-Richardson. "After the initial climbout and left turn, the mishap pilot executed an aggressive right turn. As the aircraft banked, the stall warning system activated to warn the crew of an impending stall. Instead of implementing stall recovery procedures, the pilot continued the turn as planned, and the aircraft entered a stall from which recovery was not possible. Although the pilot eventually attempted to recover the aircraft, he employed incorrect procedures, and there was not sufficient altitude to regain controlled flight. The aircraft impacted wooded terrain northwest of the airfield, damaged a portion of the Alaska Railroad, and was destroyed." The pilot, co-pilot, safety observer, and loadmaster all died instantly. The aircraft was valued at $184,570,581. The investigative board president found "clear and convincing evidence that the cause of the mishap was pilot error. The mishap pilot violated regulatory provisions and multiple flight manual procedures, placing the aircraft outside established flight parameters at an attitude and altitude where recovery was not possible. Furthermore the mishap pilot and the mishap safety observer did not realize the developing dangerous situation and failed to make appropriate inputs. In addition to multiple procedural errors, the board president found sufficient evidence that the crew on the flight deck ignored cautions and warnings and failed to respond to various challenge and reply items. The board also found channelized attention, overconfidence, expectancy, misplaced motivation, procedural guidance, and program oversight substantially contributed to the mishap."

28 July
An Iraqi Air Force Mil Mi-17 crashed in a sandstorm south-west of Baghdad, killing five.

30 July
A Hellenic Army Boeing AH-64DHA Longbow on a test flight crashed at Megara Air Force Base, Greece, killing two.

=== August ===
18 August
An Aérospatiale SA 315B Lama crashed after takeoff on the slopes of Teyozwü Hill, Viswema, Nagaland. All three army personnel on board were killed immediately on impact.

24 August
A Spanish Air Force (Ej dA) Eurofighter Typhoon fighter crashed while attempting to take off at Moron Air Base. A Lieutenant Colonel of the Royal Saudi Air Force (RSAF) was killed and the Spanish Air Force Commander ejected successfully.

=== September ===
8 September
An FMA IA 58 Pucara of the Argentine Air Force crashed into the ground near Reconquista, Santa Fe Province, after suffering a mechanical failure. Its pilot, the sole person on board, died in the accident.

=== November ===
10 November
An IAF Mikoyan-Gurevich MiG-27 fighter went down near Jodhpur in Rajasthan shortly after takeoff for a routine sortie; the pilot bailed out safely.

10 November
Israeli Air Force Lockheed Martin F-16I Sufa, 480, crashed in the area of Mitzpeh Ramon, Israel at around 20:00h local time. Neither of its crew members survived.

16 November
USAF Lockheed Martin F-22A Raptor, 06-4125, of the 525th Fighter Squadron, 3d Wing, crashed in Alaska near Susitna Lodge, killing pilot Capt. Jeffrey Haney, from Clarklake, Michigan.

20 November
Two people were taken to Pensacola Naval Hospital for evaluation after landing a USAF Beechcraft T-6 Texan II with the landing gear up. The names of the two crew members were not released after the 1300 hrs. incident, Pensacola Naval Air Station Public Affairs Officer Harry White stated. Both persons safely exited the plane, which landed at Forrest Sherman Field at the air station, White said. The aircraft and crew had been assigned to the U.S. Air Force's 455th Flying Training Squadron at NAS Pensacola. The incident, according to a NAS Pensacola news release, was being investigated by a board of officers.

=== December ===
2 December
A USN McDonnell Douglas F/A-18C Hornet, BuNo 165184, 'AD-351', suffered port undercarriage collapse on landing at NAF El Centro, California, at 1615 hrs., and departed the runway. The pilot ejected safely.

20 December
US Army Puerto Rican National Guard Eurocopter UH-72 Lakota, 07-02069, crashed in inclement weather off the coast of Rio Grande, Puerto Rico, during a Counterdrug operation. All three crewmen and three passengers aboard were killed. This was the first incident involving the UH-72 airframe.

== 2011 ==
=== January ===
20 January
An Ecuadorian Air Force (Ec.AF) de Havilland Canada DHC-6 Twin Otter FAE449 crashed near Tena, Ecuador, killing all six on board.

=== February ===
2 February
An Indian Army HAL Cheetah helicopter crashed at Nashik, Western India, killing both crew.

8 February
A Royal Jordanian Air Force (RJAF) General Dynamics F-16AM Fighting Falcon crashed in central Jordan, killing the pilot.

14 February
Two Royal Thai Air Force (RTAF) General Dynamics F-16s collided over north east Thailand. Both aircraft were destroyed but the pilots ejected safely.

25 February
A Brazilian Air Force (FAB) Embraer EMB 314 Super Tucano crashed close to Porto Velho Air Force Base. The pilot, First Lieutenant Marcelino Aparecido Feitosa, ejected and was rescued by a FAB Sikorsky UH-60 Black Hawk. He was talking during the rescue and he was kept under observation at the Army hospital.

=== March ===
1 March

Two Sri Lanka Air Force IAI Kfir C.2 fighters collided mid-air and fell near the town of Yakkala. They were on a fly-past rehearsal for the 60th anniversary of Sri Lanka Air Force. One pilot died, but the other one survived the accident.

29 March
A United States Marine Corps (USMC) Sikorsky CH-53 Sea Stallion crashed in Kāneʻohe Bay, killing one and injuring three crewmembers.

30 March
Ten sailors were injured when an engine of a USMC McDonnell-Douglas F/A-18C Hornet of VMFAT-101 based at MCAS Miramar, California, suffered a catastrophic failure while preparing for launch at 14:50 during routine training exercises from the USS John C. Stennis, about 100 miles (160 km) off the California coast. USN Cmdr. Pauline Storum said that five of the injured were taken by helicopter to the shore, four to the Naval Medical Center, San Diego, and one to Scripps Research Institute at La Jolla, California. None of the injuries were considered life-threatening but the fighter sustained damages over $1 million. The ensuing fire was quickly extinguished and the carrier itself was not damaged.

=== April ===
1 April
A United States Air Force (USAF) Fairchild Republic A-10 Thunderbolt II from Spangdahlem Air Base crashed near Laufeld, Germany. The pilot, Lieutenant Colonel Scott Hurrelbrink, ejected and was not seriously injured.

6 April
A United States Navy (USN) VFA-122 Boeing F/A-18E/F Super Hornet from Naval Air Station Lemoore crashed just outside the base, killing its two crewmembers.

28 April
Indonesian Air Force Academy Schweizer SGS 2-33A glider G-611 crashed in a sugarcane field in Sleman Regency, Yogyakarta province. Two occupants died.

=== May ===
1 May
Two USAF Sikorsky MH-60 helicopters mounted a raid from Ghazi Airbase, Afghanistan with 20–25 United States Navy SEALS on a Pakistani compound to capture or kill Osama bin Laden resulted in the death of the Al-Qaeda leader. One helicopter suffered mechanical failure due to a hard landing after reportedly striking the compound wall, and was destroyed by the special operations force, with the team members departing on two CH-47 Chinooks with bin Laden's remains. Both MH-60s were of the 160th Special Operations Aviation Regiment. Subsequent reports state that the Blackhawk helicopter destroyed was a previously unconfirmed, but rumored, stealth modification of the design.

12 May
A Força Aérea Brasileira (Brazilian Air Force) Embraer EMB 314 Super Tucano crashed close the cities of Ceará-Mirim and Pureza, 50 km north of Natal. The pilot, Danilo Bello Seixas, died; it had been his first solo flight.

16 May
Indonesian Army NBell 412SP HA-5105 crashed due to strong winds during landing in Mapenduma, Nduga Regency, Papua. Four occupants were badly injured.

=== June ===
13 June
The second test launch of the Boeing X-51 Waverider ended in failure off the Southern California coast when the vehicle failed to separate from its booster rocket after an air launch from an Edwards AFB, California-based B-52 Stratofortress. Following the drop, the X-51 fell for about four seconds before its booster successfully ignited. The vehicle fell into the Pacific Ocean after the booster did not separate as intended.

=== July ===
19 July
A Royal Thai Army Sikorsky UH-60 Black Hawk helicopter crashed killing 9 people. The chopper had been sent out to recover five bodies of victims of another helicopter, a Bell UH-1 Iroquois, that had crashed two days before while looking for illegal loggers over the Tenasserim Hills in the area between Myanmar and Thailand near Phetchaburi. A third helicopter, a Bell 212, also crashed in the same area on the Sunday following (25 July) .

25 July
The aforementioned Bell 212 helicopter crashed close to the Kaeng Krachan reservoir, a few miles further east of the site of the 19 July accident, killing three.

28 July
An Alabama Air National Guard (AaANG) General Dynamics F-16C Block 30H Fighting Falcon, 87–296, c/n 5C-557, of the 187th Fighter Wing, flying out of Montgomery Air National Guard Base, overran the runway at the EAA AirVenture Oshkosh air show at Wittman Regional Airport, Oshkosh, Wisconsin. The nose gear collapsed, the nose radome broke and the air-frame skidded to a stop. The pilot was uninjured.

=== August ===
6 August

US Army Reserve/National Guard Boeing CH-47 Chinook 84-24175, c/n M3079, callsign Extortion 17, was shot down while transporting a quick reaction force attempting to reinforce an engaged unit of Army Rangers in Wardak province, west of Kabul, Afghanistan. The resulting crash killed all 38 people on board—25 American special operations personnel, five United States Army National Guard and Army Reserve crewmen, seven Afghan commandos, and one Afghan interpreter, as well as a U.S. military working dog. It is considered the worst loss of American lives in a single incident in the Afghanistan campaign.

20 August
A BAE Systems Hawk T.1 XX179 of the Royal Air Force (RAF) Red Arrows aerobatic team crashed during a public display at Bournemouth Air Festival, killing the pilot.

=== September ===
2 September

A Chilean Air Force (ChAF) CASA C-212 Aviocar crashed into the sea off Robinson Crusoe Island. All 21 persons on board were killed.

=== October ===
2 October
Elbit Hermes 450 ZK515 of the Royal Artillery suffered an engine failure and crashed at Camp Bastion, Afghanistan.
14 October
The fourth prototype Xian JH-7A, 814, of the China Flight Test Establishment of the People's Liberation Army Air Force crashed into a marsh near Wei Nan City, Pucheng in Shaanxi Province, China, while performing in an airshow held in connection with the China International General Aviation Convention. The airframe came down ~1 mile (~1.6 km.) from Pucheng Neifu Airport. One pilot ejected safely but the second crewman was killed in the crash.

=== November ===
8 November
The pilot of BAE Systems Hawk T.1 XX177 of the Royal Air Force Red Arrows display team was killed at RAF Scampton when the ejector seat fired whilst the aircraft was on the ground.

=== December ===
1 December
Army Air Corps Westland Lynx AH.7 XX210 suffered an in-flight fire and made an emergency landing 7 nautical miles (13 km) from RAF Gütersloh, Germany. The aircraft was destroyed, but the three crew on board survived.

4 December
A US Lockheed Martin RQ-170 Sentinel unmanned aerial vehicle (UAV), conducting covert military surveillance was allegedly "brought down with minimum damage" near the city of Kashmar in northeastern Iran. The Iranian government claimed that the UAV was shot down or hacked into by its electronic warfare unit.

== 2012 ==
=== January ===
6 January
Indonesian Air Force Beechcraft T-34C-1 Turbo Mentor LD-3417 crashed into a rice field in Magelang Regency, Central Java. The pilot died.

30 January
An Indian Air Force (IAF) HAL HJT-16 Kiran Mk2 exploded in mid-air over Iyancherry village in Kancheepuram district, South India. The two pilots ejected safely.

=== February ===
3 February
Two Republic of China Air Force (RoCAF) AIDC AT-3 trainers collide, one aircraft crashed near Fangliao and other landed safely. The two pilots of the crashed AT-3 ejected safely.

6 February
A U.S. Army AH-64 Apache crashed in Paktika province while supporting ISAF forces gathering airdropped supplies. Both crew survived.

10 February
A Peruvian Air Force (PeruAF) Zlin Z-242L crashed at Pisco airfield, Peru killing the two crew.

13 February
A Sri Lankan Air Force (SLAF) Mikoyan MiG-27M crashed at Dummalasooriya, Sri Lanka. The pilot ejected safely.

13 February
A Russian Air Force Sukhoi Su-24M crashed 90 km from Shagol airfield after engine problems. Both crew ejected safely.

18 February
A USAF Pilatus U-28A crashed 10 kilometres (6 mi) from Djibouti airport, killing all four crew members.

21 February
A Royal Canadian Air Force (RCAF) Lockheed CC-130H Hercules is badly damaged by fire at Key West Naval Air Station in the United States.

22 February
Two USMC helicopters, a Bell UH-1Y and a Bell AH-1W, collide at night on the Yuma training range, Arizona, United States. All seven crew members were killed.

24 February
A USN Boeing F/A-18F Super Hornet on a training flight crashed into a dry lake bed 30 miles (50 km) from Naval Air Station Fallon. The crew was recovered by helicopter.

28 February
A Guatemalan Air Force (GuAF) Bell UH-1H crashed in bad weather near Chacalte killing all ten on board.

28 February
A United States Coast Guard (USCG) Eurocopter HH-65C crashed during a training flight in Alabama. All four crew were killed.

28 February
A Russian Sukhoi Su-30MK2 crashed in the far east of Russia on a test flight prior to delivery to Vietnamese People's Air Force (VPAF). Both pilots ejected.

=== March ===
4 March
A Yemen Air Force (YAF) Antonov An-26 transport aircraft destroyed by an explosion on the ground at Sana'a International Airport.

5 March
An Indian Air Force Dassault Mirage 2000TH crashed near Babanbas. The two crew ejected safely.

7 March
A Syrian Air Force Mikoyan-Gurevich MiG-23 was destroyed on the ground by an anti-tank missile.

12 March
A Russian Air Force Kamov Ka-52 on a training flight crashed at Bolshaya Kiselen in western Russia, killing one crew at the scene and the other crew member died in hospital. This was the first accident involving the Ka-52.

13 March
A Turkish Air Force Northrop NF-5A-2000 crashed on takeoff from Konya Air Base, Turkey, killing the pilot. The Turkish Stars aircraft was on a training flight.

15 March

Royal Norwegian Air Force Lockheed Martin C-130J Super Hercules, 5630, c/n 382-5630, "Siv", crashes into Mount Kebnekaise during the military exercise Cold Response, killing all five on board.

16 March
A Turkish Army Aviation Sikorsky S-70A-28 crashed near Kabul, Afghanistan killing all 12 on board and two civilians on the ground.

19 March
An Ecuadorian Air Force Embraer A-29B Super Tucano crashed on a training flight near Manta Air Base, Ecuador. The two crew ejected safely.

21 March
A USAF Lockheed Martin F-16CG Fighting Falcon crashed near Kunsan Air Base, South Korea. The pilot ejected but was injured.

26 March
A Republic of China Air Force (RoCAF) Sikorsky S-70C-6 crashed 20 km from Orchid Island, Taiwan during a rescue mission. One crew was rescued but five crew were missing.
28 March
An Angolan Air Force (AngAF) Aerospatiale SA316B helicopter crashed near Lunondo, Angola, killing two and injuring four.

28 March
A USAF McDonnell Douglas F-15E crashed in South-West Asia on a non-combat mission. The pilot was killed and a crewman got injured.

29 March
A Venezuelan Air Force Eurocopter AS332B1 Super Puma crashed near Chaparralito, Apure, Venezuela on an anti-narcotics mission, killing all seven on board.

=== April ===
6 April

A McDonnell Douglas F/A-18 Hornet of the USN crashed on take-off from Naval Air Station Oceana, Virginia Beach, Virginia. Both crew ejected. The aircraft crashed into a block of apartment complexes. No ground injuries were reported. However, another report states that the pilot and one individual on the ground suffered unspecified injuries of unknown severity. CNN U.S. News confirmed that the crew had ejected, but their condition is not specified.

7 April
Boeing Chinook HC.2 ZA671 of C Flight, 27 Squadron, Royal Air Force crashed in Yuma County, Arizona, United States during a training exercise. All seven people on board survived.

11 April
A USN Bell-Boeing MV-22B Osprey from USS Iwo Jima (LHD-7) crashed near Agadir, Morocco, during a joint training exercise. Two Marines were killed and two others seriously injured.

20 April
Eurocopter Squirrel HT.1 helicopter ZJ276 of the Defence Helicopter Flying School, Royal Air Force crashed at Chetwynd, Shropshire (52°48′51″N 2°24′29″W). The pilot survived.

26 April
A Bulgarian Air Force MiG-29 In Graf Ignatievo Airbase crashed shortly after takeoff, when at 10:35 took off from the runway. Both pilots survived after ejecting over Голям чардак. The NATO exercise "Thracian star 2012" was suspended due to investigation. The problem was caused by a tail strike

26 April
A Spanish Air Force Academy C101 crashed near Torrejon AFB, two occupants killed.

=== May ===
4 May
A USAF Lockheed Martin F-16 Fighting Falcon of the 421st Fighter Squadron crashed at the Utah Test and Training Range, pilot ejected safely.

23 May
A Pakistan Army School of Aviation Schweizer 300C crashed into the Chenab river in Pakistan, two occupants killed.

29 May
A Pakistan Air Force Chengdu F-7PG of the 31 Fighter Wing was destroyed by fire during maintenance at Quetta airbase.

30 May
A USN McDonnell Douglas T-45C Goshawk of TW-2 crashed 40 miles (64 km) southwest of Kingsville, Texas, both occupants ejected safely.

=== June ===
4 June
A student at the Brazilian Air Force Academy was killed when he accidentally ejected from an Embraer EMB 312 Tucano while waiting to take off at Pirassununga-Campo Fonetenelle, Brazil.

12 June
A Pakistan Air Force Dassault Mirage 5D of 8 Squadron crashed near Uthal in south-west Pakistan, pilot ejected safely.

12 June
A Belarus Air Force (BelAF) Sukhoi Su-25 from the 116 Attack Air Base crashed in the Grodno region, pilot killed.

13 June
A USAF Bell-Boeing CV-22 Osprey of the 8th Special Operations Squadron, 1st Special Operations Wing, crashed on the Eglin AFB reservation north of Navarre, Florida, during a routine training mission, injuring all five crew.

13 June
A Colombian Army Mil Mi-17-1V crashed following a post-maintenance flight test in north eastern Colombia, pilot killed and two passengers injured.

20 June
A Sudanese Air Force PT-6A crashed at Port Sudan city airport, two crew killed.

21 June

An Indonesian Air Force Fokker F27 A-2708 on a routine training flight crashed into a military housing complex in Jakarta killing ten.

22 June

A Turkish Air Force (TurkAF) McDonnell Douglas RF-4E Phantom II crashed in the eastern Mediterranean Sea after being shot at by Syrian Air Defence Force, two crew killed.

22 June
A Fuerza Aérea Mexicana (FAM) SIAI-Marchetti SF.260EU crashed into a mountain in western Mexico, two crew killed.

22 June
A Mexican Navy Eurocopter AS565MB Panther went missing, aircraft was found six days later with all on board dead.

23 June
A Colombian Army Cessna 208B Caravan crashed during near to Tocaima, all four on board killed.

28 June
A Russian Air Force Sukhoi Su-27UB crashed near Besovets during a weather-check flight, two pilots ejected safely but all Russian Su-27s were grounded pending investigation.

29 June
A USN Sikorsky MH-53 Sea Dragon of HM-14 was destroyed by fire after an emergency landing near Pohang, South Korea, all 12 on-board vacated the helicopter safely.

=== July ===
1 July
A MAFFS-equipped North Carolina Air National Guard (NCANG) Lockheed C-130H Hercules, assigned to the 145th Airlift Wing, North Carolina Air National Guard, crashed in southwest South Dakota while fighting White Draw Fire, killing four crew and seriously injuring two. Lt. Col. Paul K. Mikeal, Maj. Joseph M. McCormick, Maj. Ryan S. David, Senior Master Sgt. Robert S Cannon.

3 July
Two RAF Panavia Tornado GR.4Ts, ZD743 and ZD812 collided in mid-air and crashed in the Moray Firth, Scotland. Three of the four crew were killed.

20 July

A Royal Brunei Air Force (RBrunAF) Bell 212 crashed near Kuala Belait, Brunei, killing 12 of the 14 on board.

=== August ===
22 August
A FAB AMX International AMX hit a bird. All the electrical system and the engine were damaged. The pilot successfully landed.

25 August
An Iranian Islamic Revolutionary Guard Corps Bell 214 crashed in the Western Iran killing all three crew and on soldier on board.

29 August
A USMC Bell UH-1Y of HMLA-469 crashed in Helamand province, Afghanistan killing two soldiers from the 2nd Australian Commando Regiment.

30 August
Two IAF Mil Mi-17s collide during a training flight 12 km from the Jamnagar airbase, all nine on board the two helicopters died.

=== September ===
1 September
A USMC McDonnell Douglas F/A-18C Hornet crashed in a remote range area of the Fallon Range Training Complex, The pilot ejected from the aircraft safely.

6 September
A Russian Air Force Mikoyan MiG-29 crashed into a hill near Chilta in the Siberian Military District killing the pilot, all Mig-29 flying was suspended.

8 September
A Russian Army Mil Mi-35 crashed into a mountain in bad weather near North Cuacauss republic of Dagestan, all four on board killed.

20 September
An Airbus A320-200 operated by Syrian Air collided in mid air with a helicopter of the Syrian Arab Armed Forces while it was taking off from Damascus International Airport. Roughly half of the vertical stabilizer of the A320 was sheared off by the helicopter. The Airbus returned to the airport with no further incidents, while the helicopter crashed near the airport.

22 September
A Ukrainian Air Force (UkAF) Aero L-39 crashed after an engine fire on take-off from Chuguyiv airfield, pilot killed.

=== October ===
16 October
Indonesian Air Force BAE Hawk 209 TT-0212 crashed in the suburbs of Pekanbaru, Riau. The pilot ejected safely.

=== November ===
2 November
A Spanish Air Force F5 crashed near Badajoz AFB, 1 pilot killed, another injured.

9 November
An Algerian Air Force EADS CASA C-295 transport aircraft crashed in southern France, killing all six people on board.

10 November
A Turkish Army Aviation Sikorsky S-70 helicopter crashed near Pervari, Siirt province killing all 17 tripulants.
15 November
Lockheed Martin F-22A-10-LM Raptor, 00-4013, 'TY' tailcode, c/n 645–4013, of the 43d Fighter Squadron, crashed during a training mission E of Tyndall AFB, Florida. The pilot ejected safely and no injuries were reported on the ground. The investigation determines that a "chafed" electrical wire ignited the fluid in a hydraulic line, causing a fire that damaged the flight controls.

21 November
A Yemeni Air Force (YemAF) Antonov An-26 crashed at Sana'a, capital of Yemen, killing all 10 people on board included five military officers.

22 November
The pilot of the Czech Republic Air Force (CzAF) subsonic one-seat military aircraft Aero L-159 Alca that crashed in central Bohemia was found dead in its wreckage.

23 November
Two Venezuelan Air Force (VenAF) North American OV-10 Broncos collide during a demonstration flight near El Libertador Air Base in the state of Aragua, Venezuela. One of the pilots is killed. Three soldiers are also injured in the crash.

=== December ===
5 December
A South African Air Force (SAAF) Douglas C-47TP crashed in the Drakensberg Mountains killing all eleven people on board.

6 December
A FAB AMX International AMX collided with power lines in the state of Santa Catarina. The pilot died.

21 December

A United Nations Mil Mi-8 helicopter with a crew of five Russians was shot down near Likuangole in South Sudan by the SPLA, killing all the crew.

== 2013 ==
=== January ===
5 January
A Colombian Navy Bell 412 ARC214 crashed into the Pacific Ocean killing one and badly injuring the other five on board.

8 January
A Royal Air Force Shorts Tucano T.1, ZF349, of No. 1 Flying Training School RAF (1 FTS) made an emergency belly landing at RAF Linton-on-Ouse following an engine failure. Both crew were uninjured.

11 January
A Myanmar Air Force (MyanAF) Mil Mi-35P crashed 32 kilometres (20 mi) south of Myitkyina due to engine failure, both pilots and one other on board killed. Rebel forces also claim they had downed a government helicopter on the same day.

28 January
A USAF General Dynamics F-16 Fighting Falcon crashed during a night training exercise over the Adriatic Sea, killing the pilot.

=== February ===
11 February
An Azerbaijan Air Force (AzerAF) Mil Mi-8 crashed into the Caspian Sea, all three on board killed.

12 February
An IAF Mikoyan Gurevich MiG-27MU crashed during a training flight near Allwani Ki Dhani in Rajasthan State, pilots ejected safely but two killed on the ground.

19 February
A (YemAF) Sukhoi Su-22 crashed into Change Square, Sana'a, Yemen killing a number of civilians on the ground and badly damaging property, pilot ejected safely.

21 February
A Mexican Air Force (MexAF) Pilatus PC-6, 3303', crashed during a training flight near to the General Alfredo Leazama Alvarez Air Base in southern Mexico. Crew airlifted to hospital but both died of injuries.

=== March ===
5 March
An Indian Navy HAL Chetak helicopter, IN445, crashed into the Bay of Bengal during a routine training flight, two of the four crew missing later recovered from wreck.

7 March
A Romanian Air Force (RomAF) IAR 330 helicopter crashed near Filipești in east Romania, two of the five crew killed.

9 March
A United Nations Mil Mi-8 with a crew of four Russians crashed near Bukavu, Democratic Republic of the Congo, all crew members were killed.

9 March
A United States Army (US Army) Sikorksy UH-60L crashed during a heavy rain storm in south-eastern Afghanistan, five killed.

11 March
A USN Grumman EA-6B Prowler crashed during a scheduled low-level flight; three fatalities.

11 March
An Israeli Air Force (IDF/AF) Bell AH-1S helicopter crashed during a training flight in southern Israel, two killed.

12 March
A Zambian Air Force (ZamAF) Harbin Z-9 helicopter crashed while landing at Lusaka Airport, one of the two crew killed.

14 March
A Colombian Air Force (ColAF) Beech T-34A, FAC-2304, crashed in central western Colombia, both instructor and student killed.

16 March
A Russian Federal Border Guard Service Mil Mi-8MN crashed at Khankala Air Base in Chechnya in low visibility, three of the four crew killed.

18 March
A Mauritanian Air Force (MaurAF) Embraer EMB-312F on a post-maintenance flight crashed in a desert area in the Adar region of Mauritania, pilot ejected safely but the mechanic was killed.

=== April ===
12 April
A Chadian Air Force (ChadAF) helicopter (probably a Mil Mi-17) crashed around 50 km northeast of the Malian town of Sevare, killing all five occupants, including a senior military officer. The soldiers were part of the Chadian force of 1,800 sent to help the Malian government in the ongoing conflict within the country.

27 April
A USAF Beechcraft MC-12W Liberty crashed near Kandahar Airport, Afghanistan, killing the four crew.

=== May ===
3 May
A USAF KC-135 Stratotanker crashed in Bishkek, Chuy Province northern Kyrgyzstan, killing the three crew.

=== June ===
25 June
An IAF Mil Mi-17 carrying 20 personnel working on Flash Flood rescue operations near Gaurikund in North India crashed into hilly terrain killing all on board.

26 June
A USAF General Dynamics F-16D Fighting Falcon carrying two pilots crashed due to bird strike while conducting a "touch n go". Both pilots ejected near Luke Air Force Base in Arizona.

=== July ===
7 July
Israeli Air Force Lockheed Martin F-16I Sufa, 107, c/n 99–9400, crashed 50 km out of the coast of the Gaza strip in the Mediterranean due to engine failure. The pilots couldn't recover and were forced to eject. They both survived.

=== August ===
1 August
Two Virginia Air National Guard (VANG) General Dynamics F-16C Fighting Falcon Aircraft collided off the coast of Virginia one crashed the other was able to fly back to base. Crew from both aircraft survive.

5 August
A USAF Sikorsky HH-60 Pave Hawk helicopter crashed near Camp Hansen Training Area on Okinawa, Three of the four personnel on-board survive.

9 August
An Ethiopian Air Force Antonov An-12 crashed at Aden Abdulle International Airport in Mogadishu, Somalia while carrying a cargo of weapons and ammunition. 4 of the 6 crew members were killed.

19 August
A USAF Rockwell B-1B Lancer of the 28th Bomb Wing, from Ellsworth AFB, South Dakota, crashed in a remote area near Broadus, Montana, in the southeastern part of the state. two pilots and two weapons systems officers ejected, but with some injuries.

22 August
USN Sikorsky MH-60S Knighthawk, 617, of HSC-6 "Indians", crashed in the Red Sea. 3 Crew members were rescued, Two pilots presumed dead.

=== September ===
11 September
Two Royal Air Force of Oman (RAFO) SEPECAT Jaguars collide and crash during a training mission near Rakhyut in Oman, one pilot killed.

22 September
A RAFO Lockheed Martin F-16C Fighting Falcon fighter, crashed in Oman during a training mission, pilot killed.

23 September
A Russian Air Force Sukhoi Su-25 crashed during a training mission in the Krasnodar region of Southern Russia, pilot ejected but was killed.

=== October ===
3 October
Westland Sea King helicopter ZE428 of the Fleet Air Arm was damaged beyond economic repair in a landing accident at RNAS Yeovilton, Somerset, United Kingdom.

13 October
An Egyptian Air Force (EAF) Mikoyan-Gurevich MiG-21 crashed during a training flight near Luxor. The pilot ejected but one person on the ground was killed.

23 October
A Swiss Air Force (SwAF) McDonnell Douglas F/A-18D Hornet crashed into a mountain side near Alpnachstad during bad weather conditions. The Pilot and the flight Surgeon died in the crash.

=== November ===
9 November
An Indonesian Army Mil Mi-17 crashed during landing at Malinau after a flight from Tarakan. Thirteen of nineteen passengers and crew died in the crash.

12 November
An unarmed New York Air National Guard (NYANG) UAV crashed into Lake Ontario during a training exercise on Tuesday, 12 November 2013, the U.S. military said. The General Atomics MQ-9 Reaper of NYANG 174th Fighter Wing took off from the Wheeler Sack Army Airfield at Fort Drum, New York, as part of a mission training pilots for the USAF, NYANG Colonel Greg Semmel said.

13 November
Two Finnish Air Force (FinAF) BAE Systems Hawk collided during a training flight near Kauhava Airport in Southern Ostrobothnia, Finland. One pilot was killed while the other, who ejected, was hospitalized.

=== December ===
22 December
Royal Malaysian Air Force Sikorsky S-61A-4 Nuri M23-15 crash landed in Perak Island, Strait of Malacca. Four out of six occupants were injured. The airframe was written off.

== 2014 ==
=== January ===
7 January
A USAF Sikorsky HH-60 Pave Hawk crashed into marshes near Cley-next-the-Sea, Norfolk, United Kingdom, killing all four crew members. A bird strike had incapacitated the pilot and co-pilot.

8 January
A United States Navy Sikorsky MH-53E Sea Dragon helicopter crashed into the Atlantic Ocean 18 nautical miles (33 km) off the coast of Virginia, killing three of the five crew members

15 January
A USN Boeing F/A-18E Super Hornet of VFA-143 crashed off Virginia, pilot was rescued.

16 January
A Pakistan Air Force Dassault Mirage 5DPA2 crashed in a training accident in Pakistan, killing student and instructor.

23 January
An Italian Army Agusta-Bell 206C-1 crashed on a training flight near Rome-Viterbo, killing the trainee and the instructor, army aviation commander Gen. Calligaris.

=== February ===
3 February
Royal Thai Army Schweizer 269C 1371 crashed onto a truck during landing in Nakhon Si Thammarat province. Two occupants were uninjured.

11 February

An Algerian Air Force C-130 crashed in a mountainous area en route to Constantine, killing all but 1 of the 4 crew and 74 passengers on board.

=== March ===
1 March
A USMC McDonnell Douglas F/A-18 Hornet jet on loan to the Naval Strike and Air Warfare Center crashed in Fallon, Nevada, killing the pilot.

3 March
Scandinavian Airlines flight SK681 with 132 people on board had to take last minute evasive action to avoid colliding with a Russian spy plane (Ilyushin 20m) just off the Swedish south coast near Malmö.

4 March
An MQ-1B Predator of the 11th Reconnaissance Squadron impacted on the runway at Creech Air Force Base, Nevada, during a practice landing. The accident was revealed when Air Combat Command released the abbreviated accident investigation report on 28 October 2014. The airframe suffered significant damage with a repair cost estimate of $4.5 million during the routine launch and recovery training mission. The board president found that the cause was low-level wind shear during a critical phase of landing, coupled with the pilot's lack of training in landing operations for the MQ-1B. Incorrect control inputs caused the aircraft to continue bouncing on the runway until its undercarriage was destroyed.

18 March
A Spanish Air Force Eurocopter Super Puma crashed off the coast of Fuerteventura in the Canary Islands, four occupants were killed and one survived

28 March
An Indian Air Force Lockheed Martin C-130J Hercules crashed near Gwalior in Madhya Pradesh, while on a training mission killing all five on board and destroying the aircraft.

=== April ===
26 April
Westland Lynx AH.9A ZF540 crashed 20 kilometres (11 nmi) south of Kandahar Airfield, Afghanistan. All five people on board were killed.

=== May ===
12 May
A French Air Force Dassault Mirage 2000-5 crashed off Meurthe-et-Moselle, pilot was rescued.

17 May
A Lao People's Liberation Army Air Force Antonov An-74 crashed near Baan Nadi, Xiangkhouang. Sixteen of the Seventeen people on board were killed. The victims incluced Laotian Defence Minister Douangchay Phichit and other notable government officials

27 May
An Indian Air Force MiG-21 crashed outside Bijbehara in Jammu and Kashmir, killing the pilot.

=== June ===
2 June
Westland Gazelle XZ936 of the Empire Test Pilots School was severely damaged in a landing accident at MoD Boscombe Down.

4 June
An F/A-18E Super Hornet of VFA-81 Sun Liners crashed while trying to land on the USS. Carl Vinson off the coast of Southern California. Pilot ejected safely.

4 June
A United States Marine Corps AV-8B Harrier crashed into a house in Imperial County, California, three homes were destroyed. Pilot sustained minor injuries.

9 June
A Spanish air force Eurofighter Typhoon crashed at Morón Air Base, killing the pilot.

23 June
A fire broke out in the rear of USAF Lockheed Martin F-35A Lightning II, 10-5015, of the 58th Fighter Squadron, 'EG' tailcode, while on the runway during takeoff at 0915 hrs. from Eglin AFB, Florida. The pilot was able to shut down the engine and exit the airframe without injury. A grounding order of the 26 Air Force F-35s based at Eglin until 25 June was extended indefinitely after an initial safety investigation turns up "additional evidence and information", stated Lt. Hope Cronin, spokeswoman for the 33d Fighter Wing. The order does not affect Marines and Navy versions of the F-35, and so far is limited to Eglin. The Air Force did not release the extent of the damage, but Cronin said that the fire was significant. The fighter suffered a major engine failure that reportedly caused a 12 to 15 ft (3.7 to 4.6 m) section to detach, starting the fire. The fire was caused by excessive rubbing of fan blades inside the engine. Category 5 damage resulted and the airplane was therefore written off. The accident report, released 5 June 2015 by the Air Education and Training Command Investigation Board, confirmed that the engine failed when the third stage forward integral arm of a rotor fractured and broke free during takeoff. Pieces of the failed rotor penetrated the engine's fan case, the engine bay, an internal fuel tank and hydraulic and fuel lines before exiting through the aircraft's upper fuselage. The failure caused leaking fuel and hydraulic fluid to ignite and burn the rear two thirds of the airframe.

23 June

A German Air Force Eurofighter Typhoon collided with a civilian Learjet during an exercise. The Learjet crashed near the town of Olsberg, North Rhine-Westphalia, killing the two crew. The Eurofighter Typhoon landed safely.

=== July ===
7 July
A Vietnam People's Air Force service Mil Mi-171 helicopter with 21 troopers on board crashed in Thạch Thất District, Vietnam, eighteen crew members died and three survived with severe injuries.

13 July
A Cambodian Harbin Z-9 went down about 10 km (5.4 nmi; 6.2 mi) South of Phnom Penh; four of the five occupants died, including two Cambodian military generals.

14 July
A Sukhoi Su-57 prototype aircraft, bort T-50-5, suffered an in-flight emergency and was severely damaged by an engine fire after landing. The pilot managed to escape unharmed.

15 July
An Islamic Republic of Iran Air Force McDonnell Douglas F-4E Phantom II crashed near Bakhtegan Lake killing both pilots.

=== August ===
1 August
Indian Air Force SEPECAT Jaguar aircraft crashed in Pune. Its pilot ejected safely.

5 August
Croatian Air Force Mikoyan-Gurevich MiG-21bis aircraft crashed near Zagreb-Pleso airport due to engine fire. Its pilot ejected safely.

12 August
Indonesian Air Force FFA AS 202 Bravo LM-2022 performed an emergency landing in a rice field in Sukoharjo Regency, Central Java after reporting loss of engine power. The two pilots were uninjured.

19 August
Two Italian Air Force Panavia Tornado aircraft collided and crashed near Venarotta, Marche, Italy, killing both pilots and both weapon-system officers.

20 August
A Guatemalan Air Force Bell 206 crashed near El Aguacate, Nenton, Huehuetenango, killing all five officers on board, among them Maj. Gen. Rudy Israel Ortiz Ruiz, Chief of Defence Staff.

27 August
A Massachusetts Air National Guard McDonnell Douglas F-15 Eagle crashed near Deerfield, Virginia.

=== September ===
1 September
A United States Marine Corps Sikorsky CH-53 Sea Stallion helicopter crashed in the Gulf of Aden whilst attempting to land on USS Mesa Verde. All 25 people on board were rescued.

=== October ===
8 October
United States Air Force McDonnell Douglas F-15D-41-MC Eagle, 86-0182, c/n 0994/D062, of the 493d Fighter Squadron, 48th Fighter Wing, 'LN' tail code, crashed in a field at Broadgate, Weston Hills, Lincolnshire, United Kingdom. The pilot ejected and survived with minor injuries. He was taken by a HH-60G Pave Hawk from the resident 56th Rescue Squadron for evaluation at the RAF Lakenheath, Suffolk base hospital.

=== November ===
6 November
A United States Army Boeing AH-64D Apache crashed close to Gowen Field, Idaho in the United States; two crew members were killed.

6 November
A United States Air Force Lockheed Martin F-16C Fighting Falcon of the 82d Aerial Targets Squadron, 53d Weapons Evaluation Group, on a routine training mission out of Tyndall AFB, crashed into the Gulf of Mexico 57 miles (92 km) south of Panama City, Florida, when the base lost contact with it at ~0915 hrs. Civilian pilot Matthew LaCourse killed, body recovered later that day. LaCourse was a former USAF pilot who retired in 2000 as a lieutenant colonel after 22 years of service with over 2,000 flight hours in the F-4 Phantom II and 1,500 hours in other types, including the F-16C. He was formerly the commander of the 82d ATRS, said Lena Lopez, spokesperson for the 53d WEG. From 1 January to 12 December 2014, civilians flew 337 of the 526 sorties in QF-16s and QF-4s, or 64 percent, flown by the 82d. Civilians make up 60 percent of the 82d pilots, active duty military pilots comprise the other 40 percent.

13 November
A Nigerian Air Force Mil Mi-35P crashed near Girl, Nigeria; the three crew members killed.

17 November
Royal Thai Army Bell 212 35093 crashed shortly after takeoff in Phayao province. Nine occupants died, including a major general.

21 November
A Pakistan Air Force Dassault Mirage III crashed near the Kirthar Mountains in Pakistan, one of the two crew members was killed and the other seriously injured.

=== December ===
21 December
Royal Thai Air Force Bell 206B Jet Ranger III 4446 crashed in a bad weather in Yala province. Four occupants injured.

== 2015 ==
=== January ===
20 January
A Sikorsky UH-60A Black Hawk, 81-23560, c/n 70–281, assigned to 1–140 Avn. Co., California Army National Guard, out of Los Alamitos Army Airfield, California, suffered a hard landing at Ramona Airport, California, at ~1800 hrs. ending up on its starboard side. The crew received minor injuries and were treated at the scene before being transported to hospital for further examination. "A statement issued by the National Guard said the helicopter sustained significant damage, but did not say why the pilot had to make the forced landing." An investigation team from the NTSB arrived on the morning of 21 January. Airframe was removed by 1530 hrs. on 22 January and taken on a flatbed trailer to Joint Training Base Los Alamitos. Ramona Airport reopened to traffic at 1700 hrs.

26 January

A Greek Air Force General Dynamics F-16 Fighting Falcon crashed during takeoff from Albacete Airport, Spain. The two Greek pilots and eight French military personnel on the ground were killed. Twenty-one others on the ground were injured, six of them seriously.

31 January
Philippine Air Force SIAI-Marchetti SF.260FH, 034, c/n 10–34, crashed on a training flight into the sea off Nasugbu, Batangas, killing both pilots. The plane was flying in formation with two other planes.

31 January
An Indian Air Force Mikoyan-Guryevich MiG-21 on a training flight crashed into the sea in Gujarat, India while performing a routine exercise. The pilot ejected and was recovered shortly afterwerds.

=== February ===
20 February
Royal Thai Air Force F-16A Block 15AJ OCU 10316 crashed during a training exercise in Khok Samrong district, Lopburi province. The pilot died.

22 February
A USMC McDonnell Douglas F/A-18D Hornet impacted wooded terrain east of Statenville, Georgia. Both pilots ejected and sustained minor injuries.

24 February
Two Turkish Air Force McDonnell Douglas RF-4E Phantom II collided in mid-air and crashed during reconnaissance flights in the Akçadağ district of Turkey's Malatya province. All four pilots died

=== March ===
4 March
A Pakistani Air Force Dassault Mirage 5 crashed in bad weather near Dera Ismail Khan while on a routine training flight. Both pilots were killed.

5 March
Turkish Air Force McDonnell Douglas F-4E-2020 Terminator, 73-1025, c/n 4585, of 112 Filo "Devils" out of Eskisehir, crashed for unknown reasons during a training mission. The two pilots, Captain Mustafa Tanis and Captain Mustafa Delikanli, did not or were unable to eject.

5 March
An Indian Air Force SEPECAT Jaguar crashed due to technical issues. The pilot ejected safely.

10 March

Seven Marines and four soldiers were declared missing early Wednesday, 11 March, after an Army Sikorsky UH-60 Black Hawk helicopter crashed during a night training exercise at Eglin Air Force Base. Airbase officials said the Marines were part of a Camp Lejeune-based special operations group while the soldiers were from a Hammond, Louisiana-based National Guard unit. The helicopter was reported missing around 2030 hrs, and went down near Range A-17, in the Santa Rosa Sound, east of the Navarre Beach Bridge Tuesday and search and rescue crews found debris from the crash around 0200 Wednesday, Eglin spokesman Andy Bourland said. "At this time all are missing," Bourland said. Names of those involved were being withheld pending notification of next of kin, he said. Bourland said the Army helicopter took off from a nearby airport in Destin and joined other aircraft in the training exercise. Bourland said that the second UH-60 on the training mission was not involved in the crash and all of its crew were accounted for. The aircraft were assigned to the 1–244th Assault Helicopter Battalion in Hammond, Louisiana. The aircraft apparently struck the surface of Santa Rosa Sound, in Navarre, as wreckage and human remains were recovered from both shores of the waterway. Heavy fog slowed recovery operations. An investigation conducted by the Louisiana National Guard and the U.S. Special Operations Command found that the crash was caused when the two pilots became disoriented and lost control while switching from visual-based to instrument-based flight procedures in a thick fog, it was announced on 4 June 2015.

13 March

On 13 March 2015, Serbian Army Mi-17 crashed just short of Belgrade airport when employed in transportation, from Novi Pazar to military medical facility in Belgrade, of a 5-day-old baby with respiratory problems due to road blockade by the landslide. All 7 individuals aboard, including four crew members, two medical staff and the baby died.

15 March
Two Indonesian Air Force KAI KT-1B Woongbi (LD-0101 and LD-0103) of the Jupiter Aerobatic Team collided in mid-air during practice for the LIMA 2015 airshow at Langkawi International Airport in Kedah, Malaysia. All four pilots ejected safely.

=== April ===
16 April
A Pakistani Air Force Dassault Mirage III fighter jet crashed during a routine flight. The pilot ejected.

Vietnam People's Air Force Sukhoi Su-22M4, 5857, c/n 38920, collided in midair with a second VPAF Su-22M4 6 nmi off Phu Quy Island. Both aircraft crashed into the South China Sea. Both pilots died; the body of one pilot was found on 28 April and the second two days later.

Indonesian Air Force General Dynamics F-16C Block 25 TS-1643 (ex-USAF 85-1447, c/n 5C-227) caught fire just before take off at Halim Perdanakusuma AFB in Jakarta. The pilot was able to escape. The aircraft was written off and preserved as gate guardian.

21 April
A brand new Lockheed AC-130J Ghostrider, 09-5710, became overstressed in an accidental inverted flight condition and recovery during a medium risk flying qualities test sortie over the Gulf of Mexico by the 413th Flight Test Squadron out of Eglin Main Base, rendering the airframe a write off. An Accident Investigation Board report, released at Wright-Patterson AFB, Ohio, 6 November 2015, states that the accident, which took place ~40 miles S of Eglin Main, resulted in no injuries. A crew was performing steady heading sideslips at an altitude of approximately 15,000 feet. The aircraft exceeded the targeted angle of sideslip until it departed controlled flight and momentarily inverted before being recovered after losing approximately 5,000 feet of altitude. The aircraft was "over G'd," and exceeded its design limit load, thereby nullifying the airworthiness of the aircraft and rendering it a total loss, with damages estimated at more than $115 million. The board president found the cause of the accident to be the AC-130J pilot's "excessive rudder input during the test point followed by inadequate rudder input to initiate a timely recovery from high angle of sideslip due to overcontrolled/undercontrolled aircraft and wrong choice of action during an operation." The airframe had experienced a similar incident in February 2015.

=== May ===
8 May

A Pakistan Army Mil Mi-17 crashed, killing eight of the 20 persons aboard, including the ambassadors of Norway, Indonesia and the Philippines to Pakistan.

9 May

An Airbus A400M Atlas, EC-403, c/n 023, callsign 'CASA423', crashed after takeoff from San Pablo Airport, Seville during a pre-delivery test flight for the Turkish Air Force. Four persons were killed and two seriously injured. An investigation revealed that engine control software was installed incorrectly during final assembly.

12 May
US Navy Boeing F/A-18F Super Hornet, BuNo 166814, c/n F187, 'AB-210', of VFA-211, crashed into the Persian Gulf due to engine problems after launching off the USS Theodore Roosevelt. A 5th Fleet spokesman could not confirm whether the crash was due to pilot error or aircraft malfunction, adding that those details would be sorted out in an investigation to follow. Both pilots ejected and were quickly recovered by search-and-rescue personnel. "We're grateful for the quick work of the search and rescue pilots, and we're grateful that they're on the ship and undergoing medical care, and appear to be doing well," Cmdr. Kevin Stephens told Navy Times. Initial reports indicate both are conscious and alert, and without serious injury," 5th Fleet said.

12 May
A U.S. Marine Corps Bell UH-1Y Venom, BuNo 168792, 'SE-08', of Camp Pendleton-based HMLA-469 "Vengeance" was declared missing in the Charikot Region of the Himalaya Mountains while conducting humanitarian relief operations in the wake of the Magnitude 7.8 earthquake that struck the region earlier. PACOM issued the following statement: "On 12 May, at approximately 10 p.m. JST, a UH-1Y Huey with Marine Light Attack Helicopter Squadron 469 in support of Joint Task Force 505 was declared missing while supporting Operation Sahayogi Haat." The Nepalese Army discovered the crash site on Friday, May 15. All eight servicemembers aboard had been killed. The six U.S. Marines were Capt Dustin R. Lukasiewicz, Capt Christopher L. Norgen, Sgt Ward M. Johnson IV, Sgt Eric M. Seaman, Cpl Sara A. Medina and LCpl Jacob A. Hug. The two Nepalese soldiers were Tapendra Rawal and Basanta Titara.

17 May
One Marine was killed when Bell-Boeing MV-22B Osprey, BuNo 168020, c/n D0150, of VMM-161, 'YR-01', from the 15th Marine Expeditionary Unit experienced a hard-landing mishap and burned while conducting training aboard Marine Corps Training Area – Bellows at ~1140 hrs., Hawaii time. Twenty-one Marines and a U.S. Navy corpsman were aboard at the time, and all of the 21 surviving were transported to local hospitals for assessment and treatment. The Marines were conducting routine sustainment training at the time. The 15th MEU had departed San Diego 10 May on a seven-month deployment to the Pacific Command and Central Command areas of operation. The cause of the incident was investigated. Military officials confirmed the death of a second Marine, in hospital on 19 May. "Family members and sources close to the victim identified him as Matt Determan and said he died Tuesday from injuries sustained during the crash, which also killed 24-year-old Lance Corporal Joshua Barron and injured 20 others. At least two of the Marines who were injured in the crash remained hospitalized in stable condition on Tuesday, according to a Marine Corps. spokesperson.

22 May
A U.S. Navy aviator ejected from a McDonnell Douglas T-45C Goshawk, 'A', of VT-9, based at NAS Meridian, Mississippi, when he overran Runway 29 at Halsey Field, NAS North Island, California, at ~1400 hrs. PDT with both pilot and airframe ending up in San Diego Bay. Civilian boaters rescued the pilot who was conveyed to UC San Diego Medical Center for examination. He was treated and released. The airframe, which came to rest upright partially submerged in shallow water, was retrieved by a crane as night fell. According to the Navy the pilot, who was not named, was conducting a routine training mission to prepare for aircraft-carrier landing qualifications.

=== June ===
22 June
Four Colombian soldiers were killed and their Sikorsky UH-60 Black Hawk destroyed when the helicopter landed in a minefield planted by leftist rebels in northeastern Colombia. The soldiers were traveling to the rebel-dominated Catatumbo region to escort workers repairing an oil pipeline damaged by a recent bombing by the Revolutionary Armed Forces of Colombia. An army statement reported that six other soldiers suffered injuries in the accident, without providing more details.

24 June
Royal Thai Air Force F-16A Block 15 ADF 10208 skidded off the taxiway at the Korat Royal Thai Air Force Base in Nakhon Ratchasima province. The pilot ejected safely.

30 June

Indonesian Air Force Lockheed KC-130B Hercules, A-1310, c/n 3616, crashed shortly after takeoff from Soewondo Air Force Base, Medan due to engine failure, killing all 121 occupants and an additional 22 people on the ground.

=== July ===
7 July

Lockheed Martin F-16CJ Block 50 Fighting Falcon, 96-0085, of the 55th Fighter Squadron, 20th Fighter Wing, collided at ~1130 hrs. with a civilian Cessna 150M with two aboard over Moncks Corner, Berkeley County, South Carolina, both aircraft coming down near Lewisfield Plantation in Moncks Corner. The F-16 pilot ejected and was recovered. The Cessna fuselage wreckage came down in a rice field, with no survivors.

14 July
Russian Air Force Tupolev Tu-95MS, RF-94207, c/n 00854, '77 red', crashes near Litovka, 80 kilometers from Khabarovsk, following possible engine failure. The seven crewmembers bailed out; two died while landing, while the five others landed safely.

=== August ===
11 August
A McDonnell Douglas F/A-18C Hornet spotted ahead of the island aboard USS Harry S. Truman caught fire while undergoing refuelling during night operations off the Virginia Capes, injuring two. The pilot ejected and landed on the flight deck. After receiving medical treatment aboard, he was transferred to New Hanover Regional Medical Center in Wilmington, North Carolina. A sailor assigned to the ship suffered injuries that were not considered life-threatening and was also taken to hospital. Flight deck firefighters extinguished the blaze. An investigation was undertaken.

12 August
A U.S. Army Sikorsky MH-60L Black Hawk crashed during a training mission while landing on the USNS Red Cloud about 20 miles (32 kilometers) east of Okinawa, injuring seven persons and damaging the aircraft, officials stated. The injured were transported to a Navy hospital, the statement continued. Their conditions were not immediately clear. The other 10 persons aboard the helicopter were not hurt, said Japanese coast guard spokesman Shinya Terada. Japanese national broadcaster NHK showed video of the helicopter sitting on the cargo ship, with its tail broken off and covered with an orange tarpaulin.

22 August

A Hawker Hunter, an ex-military jet aircraft being operated as a warbird crashed onto a major trunk road during a display at the Shoreham Airshow at Shoreham Airport, England, killing 11 persons and injuring 16 others. It was the deadliest air show accident in the United Kingdom since the 1952 Farnborough Airshow crash, which killed 31 people. The pilot, who survived, had become incapacited due to sudden excessive g-forces during a manoeuvre, which was captured on video. He was later tried at the Old Bailey on charges of manslaughter and acquitted.

=== September ===
2 September
A U.S. Army Sikorsky UH-60 Black Hawk helicopter from Fort Carson Army base crashed during a training mission in a wooded area of Douglas County, Colorado. All four people aboard were rescued and transported for medical treatment.

=== October ===
2 October
A Lockheed Martin C-130J Super Hercules of the United States Air Force with 11 people on board crashes 28 seconds after taking off from Jalalabad Airport, Jalalabad, Afghanistan. All 11 people on board and three people on the ground were killed.
14 October
Swiss Air Force McDonnell Douglas F/A-18D Hornet, J-5235, c/n 1325, 'SFD005', crashed at Glamondans, Doubs, France, due to engine failure during a steep climb. Its pilot ejected and survived.

22 October
A Spanish Air Force Super Puma crashed near Canary Islands; all of its occupants were killed.

=== November ===
5 November
Czech Air Force Mil Mi-171S, 9774, c/n 59489619774, crashed for reasons unknown during NATO exercise "Trident Juncture" in Spain 15 km southeast of Zaragoza. Five people aboard were taken to the local hospital.

11 November
Ukraine Air Force Sukhoi Su-25M1, 07 blue, c/n 10131, of the Mykolaiv Air Brigade, crashed during a training exercise 40 km north of Zaporhizia, possibly after hitting a power line. The pilot, Yegor Bolshakov, was killed.

23 November
US Army Sikorsky UH-60 Black Hawk, 87-24651, c/n 701193, of the 291st Aviation Regiment, crashed at Fort Hood after the crew performed a turn that was too steep, killing all four on board.

23 November
US Army Boeing AH-64D Apache Longbow, 08-05562, crashed in Wonju County, Gangwon Province, South Korea, killing both pilots.

24 November

Russian Air Force Sukhoi Su-24M, RF-90932, c/n 0615326, '83 white', was shot down near the Syria–Turkey border by a Turkish Air Force F-16 after it entered Turkish airspace. Both the pilot and weapons system officer ejected; the weapons system officer, Konstantin Murakhtin, was rescued by Syrian/Russian special forces, but the pilot, Lt Col Oleg Anatolyevich Peshkov, was shot and killed by ground fire while descending.

24 November
Pakistan Air Force Chengdu FT-7, 03-689, crashed due to technical failures over Kucha Gujrat, Mianwali District in Punjab Province. The crew ejected after navigating the jet beyond civilian settlements before crashing. In the aftermath, Squadron Leader Saqib Abbasi suffered only minor injuries while co-pilot Flying Officer Marium Mukhtar did not survive her injuries, becoming the first Pakistani female fighter pilot to be killed in an operation.

=== December ===
20 December
Indonesian Air Force KAI T-50I Golden Eagle, TT-5007, crashed at an airshow at Yogyakarta; the pilots, Lt Col Marda Sarjono and Capt Diwi Cahyadi, were killed.

== 2016 ==
=== January ===
3 January
An Afghan National Army Mil Mi-17 helicopter crashes in Logar Province during a training exercise possibly due to a technical malfunction, killing three.

12 January
An Islamic Republic of Iran Air Force McDonnell Douglas F-4 Phantom II crashes at Konarak, Sistan and Baluchestan Province, killing both pilots.

14 January

Two United States Marines Sikorsky CH-53E Super Stallion helicopters (BuNos 161255 and 163061) collide off Oahu, Hawaii, during a nighttime flight, killing all 12 on board both aircraft. Pilot inexperience is blamed.

27 January
An Egyptian Air Force General Dynamics F-16B Block 15 crashes at Al Ismailiyah Air Base during a training exercise due to technical failure, killing both pilots.

=== February ===
9 February
Pakistan Air Force PAC MFI-17 Mushshak 96-5383, c/n 383, crashes in the Gujrat district of Punjab, killing both pilots.

10 February
Recently delivered Indonesian Air Force Embraer EMB-314 Super Tucano TT-3108 crashes into a house at Malang in East Java during a post-maintenance test flight, killing both pilots and two on the ground. The pilot managed to eject, but died of his injuries.

Myanmar Air Force Beechcraft 1900D 4601 crashes in a field shortly after takeoff from Naypyidaw International Airport, killing all five on board.

11 February
Greek Navy Agusta-Bell AB212 PN28 crashes on the island of Kinaros during training exercise "Thunder", killing all three on board.

15 February
South Korean Army Bell UH-1H Iroquois 827 crashes at Chuncheon, Gangwon Province, killing three of four on board.

16 February
An Iraqi Army Mil Mi-17 crashes near Al-Kout, Wasit Governate due to technical malfunction, killing at least nine.

17 February
An Iraqi Army Bell IA-407 crashes near Amiriyat Al-Fallujah possibly caused by an Islamic State machine gun, killing two.

26 February
Royal Malaysian Air Force IPTN/CASA CN-235M-VIP M44-07, c/n N.055, crashes into shallow water off Kuala Selangor and catches fire, eight crew members survive but a local fishermen drowns trying to help.

=== March ===
An E-2C Hawkeye is nearly sent into the water (no audio)

18 March
A landing U.S. Navy E-2C Hawkeye, BuNo 165293, of VAW-123, runs off the flight deck of the USS Dwight D. Eisenhower when a landing cable snaps. The Hawkeye is able to recover level flight, though eight sailors are injured. An arresting cable engine designed to slow the aircraft failed, causing the cable to snap. A Navy report faulted maintainers for a "lack of procedural compliance."

20 March
Indonesian Army Bell 412EP HA-5171 crashed due to poor weather in Poso Regency, Central Sulawesi. All 13 occupants died.

=== April ===
6 April
A Eurocopter EC145 belonging to the Albanian Air Force crashed in the waters of Lake Skadar while on a standard exercise flight. Out of the three crew members, only one survived.

27 April
A People's Liberation Army Naval Air Force Shenyang J-15 crashes on landing at Huangdicun, China; the pilot is able to eject but dies of his injuries.

=== May ===
17 May
Royal Malaysian Air Force Aermacchi MB-339CM M34-20 crashed in a rice field in Pahang. Two pilots ejected, one received minor injury.

18 May
United States Air Force Boeing B-52H Stratofortress, 60-0047, c/n 464412, overruns the runway and crashes following an aborted takeoff at Andersen Air Force Base, Guam. All seven on board survive.

=== June ===
2 June
A Blue Angels F/A-18 piloted by Capt. Jeff "Kooch" Kuss (Opposing Solo, Blue Angel No. 6), crashes just after takeoff while performing the Split-S maneuver during a practice run for The Great Tennessee Air Show in Smyrna, Tennessee. The Navy investigation found that Capt. Kuss performed the maneuver at too low of an altitude while failing to retard the throttle out of afterburner, causing him to fall too fast and recover at too low of an altitude. Capt. Kuss ejected, but his parachute was immediately engulfed in flames, causing him to fall to his death. Kuss' body was recovered multiple yards away from the crash site. The cause of death was blunt force trauma to the head. The investigation also cites weather and pilot fatigue as additional causes to the crash.

9 June
Two Swiss Air Force Northrop Grumman F-5E of Patrouille Suisse collides in mid-air. One aircraft crashed at Bitgum, Friesland, Netherlands. The second aircraft landed at Leeuwarden Air Base. The pilot of the aircraft that crashed ejected.

9 June
A Russian Knights Sukhoi Su-27 crashes near the village of Muranovo, Moscow Oblast, Russia, when returning to Kubinka Air Base after performing a scheduled flight, killing pilot Major Sergey Yeremenko. According to the Russian Defence Ministry the pilot had no time to eject due to his effort to try divert the aircraft out of populated area. Technical fault likely caused the crash.

25 June
A Royal Thai Air Force Bell UH-1H crashes in Khao Chamao-Khao Wong National Park, killing all three on board.

26 June
Colombian Army Mil Mi-17V-5, EJC-3393, c/n 170M19, crashes in Caldas Province in poor weather, killing all 17 on board.

=== July ===
1 July
Mexican Air Force AgustaWestland AW109SP, 1908, c/n 22320, crashes near Ozumba de Alzate for reasons unknown, killing all three on board.

5 July
Libyan National Army Miyokan-Gurevich MiG-23BN, 8985, departing from Baninah crashes in Benghazi, Libya due to a technical error, killing the pilot.

8 July
An Indonesian Army Bell 205A-1, HA-5073, c/n 30259, crashes into two houses in Tamanmartani village, Sleman, Yogyakarta. Of the six crew members, three were killed and three were injured.

11 July
Portuguese Air Force Lockheed C-130H Hercules, 16804, c/n 4777, crashes next to the runway on takeoff from Montijo Air Base, Portugal, killing three of seven on board.

14 July
A Tunisian Army Bell UH-1H Iroquois, possibly L81-920 and c/n 13837, crashes as Sfax, Tunisia for reasons unknown, killing both pilots.

17 July
A Libyan National Army Mil Mi-171 crashes either because of a technical fault or a shootdown at al-Magroon, western Banghazi, Libya, killing all four on board. Some reports mention the crashed aircraft as a Mil Mi-35 while other reports stated a death toll of six, including three French soldiers.

22 July

Indian Air Force Antonov An-32, K-2743, c/n 0809?, disappears with six crew members and 23 personnel on board. The aircraft took off on a routine weekly courier flight from Chennai and was scheduled to arrive Port Blair at 11:30 IST. It was last seen on radar at 09:00 over the Bay of Bengal.

25 July
A Royal Saudi Land Forces Boeing AH-64 Apache attack helicopter crashes in the Marib province in northern Yemen, due to poor weather. Both members of the helicopter crew were killed.

28 July
United States Navy McDonnell Douglas F/A-18C Hornet, BuNo 165194, c/n 1337, of the 3rd Marine Aircraft Wing, crashes near Marine Corps Air Ground Combat Center Twentynine Palms in Twentynine Palms, California, during a strafing run as part of a training mission. The pilot, a major, was killed.

=== August ===
2 August
United States Navy McDonnell Douglas F/A-18C Hornet, BuNo 165192, c/n 1333, 'WT-04', crashes during a training mission near Naval Air Station Fallon in Nevada. The aircraft was assigned to Marine Strike Fighter Squadron 232, based at Marine Corps Air Station Miramar in California, and had been on temporary assignment to the Strike Fighter Wing Pacific Detachment at Naval Air Station Fallon. The pilot is able to eject and is taken to Banner Churchill Regional Medical Center.

4 August
An Indian Air Force BAE Systems Hawk trainer crashes shortly after takeoff from Kalaikunda Air Force Station in West Midnapore. Both pilots ejected safely and the aircraft crashed within the boundaries of the base.

9 August
Royal Air Force Bell Griffin HT1, ZJ241, c/n 36164, performs a forced landing on the peak of Yr Aran, Snowdonia, Wales due to a technical problem; all six people on board are able to escape before the aircraft catches fire.

14 August
Royal Thai Army Eurocopter UH-72A Lakota 9656 crashed in the Doi Inthanon mountain, Chiang Mai province. Five occupants were killed, including a major general.

29 August
Swiss Air Force McDonnell Douglas F/A-18C Hornet, J-5022, c/n 1371, strikes a mountain in the Susten Pass area shortly after taking off at the Meiringen Air Base and explodes. The cause was a false height indication from the control center. Because the weather was also bad during this and the following days, the body of 27-year-old pilot could only be salvaged two days later.

=== September ===
10 September
Indian Air Force Mikoyan-Gurevich MiG-21UM, U2140, of No. 4 Squadron, crashes in Barmer, Rajasthan, at around 12:15 p.m. The pilots eject safely. The aircraft, flying from Uttarlai Air Force Station, crashed around 75 km away from the base. The aircraft was on a routine training mission.

13 September
An Indian Air Force SEPECAT Jaguar catches fire while taxiing at Ambala. The pilot manages to eject but the aircraft is written off.

16 September
Royal Thai Army Bell UH-1H Iroquois 0019 crash landed and burned in Mueang Narathiwat district, Narathiwat province. Four occupants were injured.

20 September
An Indian Air Force Mikoyan-Gurevich MiG-21 crashes at Srinagar Airport in Kashmir. The plane had overshot the runway. The pilot managed to eject safely.

20 September
U.S. Air Force Lockheed TU-2S, 80-1068, 'article 068', assigned to the 1st Reconnaissance Squadron of the 9th Reconnaissance Wing at Beale Air Force Base crashes in a rural area near the Sutter Buttes in Sutter County, California while on a training mission. While recovering from a stall as part of the training flight, the interviewing pilot accidentally puts the aircraft into a second stall. The aircraft rolls left and goes into a nose-low attitude. The instructor pilot realizes that the aircraft is out of control and nearly inverted, and orders ejection. Both pilots eject, but the instructor pilot and seat strike the right wing, killing him. The crash, combined with hot weather conditions and wind, resulted in a 250-acre wildfire, which was extinguished by firefighters.

22 September
A U.S. Marine Corps McDonnell Douglas AV-8B Harrier II crashes off the coast of Okinawa, Japan. 33rd Rescue Squadron together with JSDF rescued the pilot.

24 September
A Pakistan Air Force Chengdu F-7PG Skybolt crashes at Jamrud, Khyber Agency due to technical malfunction during a training flight, killing the pilot.

27 September
A Pakistan Air Force JF-17 Block 2 crashes into the Arabian Sea during 'Exercise High Mark'. The pilot is able to eject and survives.

28 September
Swiss Air Force Eurocopter AS532 Cougar,T-338, c/n 2545, crashes in the Gotthard Pass after hitting a power line during takeoff, killing both pilots; the remaining occupant is seriously injured.

=== October ===
3 October
An Indian Air Force SEPECAT Jaguar trainer aircraft crashes in the Pokhran desert due to a technical malfunction. Both pilots eject successfully.

4 October
Royal Malaysian Air Force Sikorsky S-61A-4 Nuri M23-33, c/n 61800, crashes into the roof of a school in Tawau, Sabah. All fourteen occupants and several people on the ground were injured.

5 October
Israeli Air Force Lockheed Martin F-16I Sufa, 119, c/n YD-21, crashes on landing at Ramon AFB due to loss of control, killing the pilot; the weapon systems operator was lightly injured. The aircraft was returning from operational activity in the Gaza strip.

18 October
Pakistan Air Force Mirage 3, 921, of 22 Squadron, crashes near Karachi's Musharraf Colony area, killing Wing Commander Fayyaz.

19 October
An Indian Air Force Mil Mi-17V5 suffers extensive structural damage when it crashes during training in Uttarakhand. All 15 occupants of the helicopter are able to escape.

24 October
A Fairchild Swearingen Metroliner, operated by CAE Aviation, crashed after taking off from Malta International Airport, Malta. The aircraft was carrying employees of the Directorate-General for External Security on a surveillance mission. All 5 occupants died and the aircraft was destroyed.

26 October
USMC F/A-18C crashed near 29 Palms. The pilot ejects and survives.

=== November ===
9 November
Two USMC single-seat F/A-18s collide off San Diego. Both pilots survive.

24 November
Indonesian Army Bell 412EP HA-5166 went missing over the jungle in Long Sulit, Malinau Regency, North Kalimantan. Rescuers found the wreckage and a survivor on 27 November, with another survivor found on 8 December. Out of five occupants, two survived and three died.

28 November
An RCAF CF-188 crashes near CFB Cold Lake, Alberta, during a routine training flight.

=== December ===
7 December
USMC single-seat F/A-18C Hornet piloted by Capt. Jake Fredrick crashed in the Pacific Ocean, about 120 miles southeast of Iwakuni, Japan. The pilot escapes but dies after ejecting out of the plane. His body is found and identified next day.

13 December
USMC MV-22B Osprey crashes on Tuesday in shallow water off Camp Schwab, Okinawa, Japan. All five crew members aboard the Osprey were rescued by the USAF 33d Rescue Squadron at Kadena Air Base, Okinawa.

18 December
Indonesian Air Force Lockheed C-130H Hercules A-1334, c/n 4785, crashed into a hill during landing at Wamena Airport in Papua Province. All 13 occupants were killed.

21 December
Royal Malaysian Air Force Beechcraft B200T Super King Air M41-03 crashed during landing at RMAF Butterworth Air Base in Penang. One of the occupants died.

25 December

Russian Air Force Tupolev Tu-154, RA-85572, c/n 83A-572, carrying members of the Alexandrov Ensemble choir, including its director Valery Khalilov, as well as journalists, to a new year concert for troops in Syria, crashes into the Black Sea after departing Sochi, killing all 92 people on board.

== 2017 ==
=== January ===
14 January
A Royal Thai Air Force Saab JAS 39C Gripen crashes during an air show for the Children's Day Airshow in Hat Yai, Songkhla province, Thailand. Sqn Ldr Dilokrit Pattavee was killed when the aircraft crashed on a runway at Wing 56 during the air show at around 9.20 am. About an hour later, Thai media reported an airport fire engine overturned while rushing to put out the fire. Hat Yai International Airport had to close to clear the runway. The cause of the crash is not yet known.

=== February ===
17 February
During a Swiss Air Force PC-7 Team display at the FIS Alpine World Ski Championships 2017 one of the airplanes flew too low and hit a rail cam, destroying it and damaging the plane. The pilot landed the plane at a near airfield. Because it was the fifth incident within seventeen months in the Swiss Air Force, an investigation was initiated and the PC-7 Team was grounded for a few weeks.

=== March ===
14 March
United States Air Force Pilatus U-28A, 08-0742, c/n 724, of the 318th Special Operations Squadron, crashes in a field southeast of the Clovis Municipal Airport while practicing at a low altitude the Emergency Turnback Maneuver during which the air craft simulates engine failure and a return to the landing field. Three United States Air Force servicemen were fatally wounded. The aircraft entered a stall and lost control as a result of pilot error.

=== April ===
17 April
US Army Sikorsky UH-60 Black Hawk, 90-26303, c/n 70–1537, of the 12th Aviation Battalion, crashes onto a golf course in Leonardtown, Maryland. One of the three crewmen was pronounced dead at the scene.

18 April
A Sikorsky UH-60 Black Hawk of the Saudi Arabian Armed Forces was shot down over Marib Governorate, Yemen, due to a friendly fire incident, killing all 12 occupants on board.

=== May ===
2 May
A USAF MQ-9 Reaper based at Holloman AFB crashed near the base while on a regularly scheduled training mission. As of 2 May 2017 the incident is under investigation.

23 May
An Indian Air Force Sukhoi Su-30MKI went missing while on training mission near Tezpur, Assam. The aircraft's wreckage was found three days later along with the blackbox. Both the pilots, Ft. Lt. Achudev and Sqn. Ld. D Pankaj, were killed.

31 May
A Turkish military Eurocopter AS532UL Cougar crashes shortly after taking off from a base in the region of Şenoba in Şırnak province, 13 soldiers die.

=== June ===
7 June

Myanmar Air Force Shaanxi Y-8F-200W 5820 crashes into the Andaman Sea off Dawei; all 122 on board die in Myanmar's deadliest air disaster. The aircraft encountered icing conditions, causing a stall and eventually an unrecoverable spin.

12 June
A Mikoyan-Gurevich MiG-21 of the Romanian Air Force crashes in Constanța County, with its pilot, Adrian Stancu, managing to escape in time and survive.

15 June
Royal Malaysian Air Force BAE Hawk 108 M40-02 crashed in Terengganu. Two pilots died.

=== July ===
2 July
National Search and Rescue Agency Eurocopter AS365N3+ Dauphin HR-3602, operated by Indonesian Navy crew, crashed into a cliff in Temanggung, Central Java. All eight occupants were killed.

10 July

United States Marine Corps Lockheed Martin KC-130T, BuNo 165000, c/n 5303, "Triple Nuts", (Yanky 72) crashes on a flight in Leflore County, Mississippi, killing at least 16 people on board. The USMC released a statement calling the event a "mishap." The United States Marine Corps released a statement stating that "...indications are that something went wrong at cruise altitude." Brigadier General James also said that there were two impact sites about a mile apart.

=== August ===
11 August

A Sikorsky UH-60 Black Hawk of the United Arab Emirates Armed Forces crashed in the Ar Rawdah district, Yemen, killing at least 4 people on board.
August 12
A US Navy McDonnell Douglas F/A-18 Hornet, based on USS Nimitz, overruns the runway at Bahrain International Airport due to an engine failure. The pilot makes a successful ejection.
August 16
A Let L-410 Turbolet of the Honduran Air Force crashed into a building near the Comayagua-Palmerola air base during a training flight, one of the three people on board was killed.

=== September ===
1 September
A Eurofighter Typhoon of the Royal Air Force overran the runway on landing at Pardubice Airport, Czech Republic.

5 September
Unknown model United States Air Force aircraft crashes at the Nevada Test and Training Range, killing the pilot. Spokespeople decline to state the type of aircraft.

14 September
Russian Air Force Tupolev Tu-22M3 RF-94233, of the 326th Heavy Bomber Division, overruns the runway at Shaykovka, Kaluga Region, Russia and is damaged beyond repair.

28 September
USMC Bell Boeing MV-22B YP-01/168281 operating in Syria as part of Operation Inherent Resolve is destroyed in a hard landing. Two people on board the aircraft were injured.

30 September
Air Force of the Democratic Republic of the Congo Antonov An-12B, EX-001, crashes shortly after take-off from Kinshasa International Airport for Bunia Airport. All eight people on board are killed.

=== October ===
10 October
A Russian Air Force Sukhoi Su-24M crashes during takeoff at Khmeimim Air Base, Latakia province, supposedly due to technical malfunction. Both crew members fail to eject and die in the crash.

12 October
Spanish Air Force Eurofighter C.16, crashes on landing from Los Llanos Airbase, Spain due pilot mistake, killing the pilot.

17 October
Spanish Air Force McDonnell-Douglas EF-18M Hornet C.15-52, c/n 785/A569, crashes on takeoff from Torrejón Air Base, Spain due to engine failure, killing the pilot.

=== November ===
22 November
US Navy Grumman C-2A Greyhound, BuNo 162175, c/n 55, of VRC-30, crashes in the Philippine Sea about 500 nautical miles, southeast of Okinawa Island, Japan. Of the 11 people on board, eight are rescued, but the US Navy and the Japanese Self-Defence Force search for the remaining three until November 24. Wreckage of the aircraft is found on December 29 in 5,640 m (18,500 ft) of water. This plane carried out connection flights between Iwakuni Marine Corps Air Station and the aircraft carrier USS Ronald Reagan.

== 2018 ==
=== January ===
20 January
A US Army Boeing AH-64E Apache crashes during training at the base in the Mojave Desert, California, killing both pilots.

27 January
A Royal Australian Air Force Boeing EA-18G Growler catches fire on takeoff. The aircraft skids off the runway and sustains damage.

29 January
People's Liberation Army Air Force Shaanxi Y-8GX-3 30513 crashes at Zhengchang. All twelve people on board are killed.

=== February ===
2 February
Two Gazelle military helicopters belonging to military flying school: Ealat collide at Carcès lake, north of St Tropez, France. The collision kills at least 5 people according to local officials.

3 February
Russian Air Force Sukhoi Su-25SM RF-94586/06, c/n 10393, is shot down over Idlib province while providing air support to Syrian government forces attacking the city of Saraqib. Pilot Major Roman Filipov manages to eject but is wounded while fighting militants after landing in a rebel controlled territory; he blows himself up to avoid capture. The Russian Ministry of Defence revealed that the aircraft was targeted by a MANPADS system.

5 February
JGSDF Boeing AH-64D Apache Longbow 74502, c/n JP002, crashes at Chiyoda, Saga Prefecture after the main rotor breaks apart in flight, killing both of its crew and injuring a local resident on the ground. The main rotor head was a rebuilt unit from another AH-64D.

10 February

An Israeli F-16I is shot down by Syrian anti-aircraft fire and crashes in northern Israel with both crew surviving. According to the Israeli military the plane was carrying out a strike against an Iranian control system after an Iranian drone violated Israeli airspace. Syria denies the drone entered Israeli airspace. In retaliation for the shoot-down the Israeli military said it carried out a "large scale attack" on Iranian targets in Syria.
10 February
A Turkish TAI/AgustaWestland T129 ATAK attack helicopter is shot down by YPG fighters near Afrin, Syria. The two soldiers on board are killed. It is the first aircraft loss of Turkey since its involvement in the Syrian Civil War.

=== March ===
6 March

Russian Air Force Antonov An-26 RF-92955/52, c/n 10107, crashes on approach to Khmeimim air base in Syria, killing all 39 people on board. A technical fault is suspected.

14 March
US Navy F/A-18F Super Hornet BuNo 166683, of VFA-213, crashes roughly a mile off the end of the runway at Naval Air Station Key West in Florida following an in-flight fire. Both pilots are able to eject, but die shortly after recovery. A preliminary investigation revealed that the aircraft was attempting to land with one engine out.

15 March
A Mi-17 military helicopter crashed in southwest Senegal, killing eight people and injuring 13 others.

A US military Sikorsky HH-60G Pave Hawk helicopter, of the 176th Wing of the Alaska Air National Guard, crashes in Western Iraq after striking a power pole, killing all seven aboard.

18 March
A Syrian Arab Air Force Su-24 is shot down by rebels in East Qalamoun, East of Damascus province, crashing in friendly territory. The fate of the crew is unknown. A video emerged showing at least one of the pilots ejecting successfully.

20 March
Royal Air Force BAE Systems Hawk T1 XX204, c/n 312051/051 of the Red Arrows display team, crashed at RAF Valley, Anglesey. The pilot was able to eject, but an engineer died in the crash. RAF grounds all Hawk T1s three days later.

=== April ===
3 April
A U.S. Marine Corps AV-8B Harrier crashes in Djibouti shortly after take-off.

Myanmar Air Force Chengdu F-7M 1648 crashes in a rice paddy near Kone Kyun village, Bago region; pilot Major Arkar Win is able to eject, but dies later of his injuries in hospital. A witness reported a loud explosion before the crash.
3 April
An Indian Air Force Mil Mi-17-V5 crashes after striking an iron girder while landing, killing one and injuring three.

A USMC CH-53E Super Stallion, of the 3rd Marine Aircraft Wing, crashes near Naval Air Field El Centro for reasons unknown, killing all 4 crewmen.

5 April
A US Air Force Flight Demonstration Team F-16 crashes in Nevada, killing the pilot.

A Republic of Korea Air Force McDonnell Douglas F-15K Slam Eagle crashes into a mountain near Chilgok for reasons unknown while en route to an air base, killing the pilot; the copilot remains missing. The ROKAF grounds all F-15Ks (except those needed for national defense) as a result of the crash.

6 April
A US Army Boeing AH-64E Apache helicopter, of the 101st Combat Aviation Brigade, crashes at Fort Campbell in Kentucky, killing both pilots.

11 April

Algerian Air Force Ilyushin Il-76TD, 7T-WIV, c/n 1043419649, crashes shortly after takeoff from Boufarik Airport near the capital of Algeria, killing all 257 people on board.

13 April
A United States Air Force F-22 Raptor fighter jet was damaged when it experienced an engine malfunction during takeoff. Apparently the left engine basically stopped working on takeoff, suddenly depriving the pilot of enough thrust to continue ascent after he had already raised the landing gear, forcing for a hard, belly landing that lasted for more than a mile.

24 April
United States Air Force Lockheed Martin F-16C Block 42, 90-0760, c/n 1C-368, of the 56th Fighter Wing, overruns the runway while attempting to land at Lake Havasu City Airport. The pilot is able to eject safely.

29 April
A Libyan Air Force Lockheed C-130H-30 Hercules crashes shortly after takeoff. Out of the four total crew members and passengers aboard, three are killed on impact. The crash happened near the El Sharara oil field in Libya.

=== May ===
2 May

United States Air Force Lockheed WC-130H Hercules 65-0968, c/n 4110, of the 156th Airlift Wing of the Puerto Rico Air National Guard, crashes on Georgia State Route 21 in Port Wentworth, Georgia while on climbout from Savannah/Hilton Head International Airport and catches fire, killing all nine on board. This was to be the aircraft's last flight before retirement at the 309th Aerospace Maintenance and Regeneration Group (AMARG) base in Arizona.

3 May
A Russian Air Force Sukhoi Su-30SM crashes in the sea off Jiblah, Latakia, Syria shortly after takeoff, killing both pilots. The aircraft probably suffered a bird strike.

7 May
A Russian Air Force Kamov Ka-52 helicopter crashes during a routine flight over eastern Syria due to technical failure, killing both pilots.

22 May
Royal Thai Air Force Aero L-39ZA Albatros 40108 crashed on a golf course in Sam Ngao district, Tak province. One of the pilot died, the other one was seriously injured.

23 May
A United States Air Force Northrop T-38 Talon crashes in Mississippi during a training mission, both pilots eject safely.

=== June ===
4 June
A Republic of China Air Force General Dynamics F-16 Fighting Falcon piloted by Major Wu Yen-ting (吳彥霆) crashed on Wufenshan, Ruifang District, New Taipei City.

11 June
A U.S. military McDonnell Douglas F-15 Eagle fighter jet crashed in waters off Japan's southern island of Okinawa, where the bulk of U.S. forces in Japan are based, during a routine training mission.

22 June
A United States Air Force A-29 Super Tucano crashed during the Light Attack Experiment evaluation program, at the Red Rio Bombing Range inside the White Sands Missile Range. The pilot was killed in the crash.

=== July ===
5 July
Royal Thai Army Cessna U-17B 1454 crashed in Mueang Mae Hong Son district, Mae Hong Son province near the border with Myanmar. Four occupants died.

6 July
A Polish Air Force Mikoyan-Gurevich MiG-29 crashed during a night flight in a field in the village of Sakówko, just about 500 meters from the residential buildings. The pilot managed to eject, but did not survive.

7 July
A Romanian Air Force Mikoyan-Gurevich MiG-21 crashed during the Borcea Open Day air show. The pilot managed to eject, but did not survive.

20 July
A privately owned de Havilland Venom crashed into a barn shortly after taking off from Sheboygan County Memorial Airport, Wisconsin, killing the pilot and injuring two people on the ground. Several calves inside the barn were killed and injured as well.

27 July
A window fell off a U.S. military helicopter at the U.S. Atsugi base in Kanagawa Prefecture southwest of Tokyo, no one was injured.

=== August ===
10 August

A Horizon Air Bombardier Dash 8 Q400 is stolen from Seattle–Tacoma International Airport with no passengers on board, prompting F15 fighter jets to scramble and intercept. After being contacted by Seattle/Tacoma air traffic control, the plane crashes near Ketron Island in Pierce County, Washington, killing the 29-year-old male pilot

17 August
A United States Air Force Northrop T-38 Talon crashed near the Oklahoma City, near the Vance Air Force Base. Pilot safely ejected.

=== September ===
17 September

A Russian Air Force Ilyushin Il-20M ELINT aircraft was shot down by a Syrian S-200 missile when returning to the Khmeimim Air Base after a reconnaissance flight, killing all 15 Russian servicemen on board. The aircraft was shot down due to friendly fire when the SyADF mistook the plane for one of the four Israeli Air Force F-16s attacking the Syrian targets in the Latakia province at the very same time. Following the shootdown, Russia asserted that Israel bore responsibility for the incident.

18 September
A United States Air Force Beechcraft T-6 Texan II crashed in a field near the town of San Antonio, Texas. The crew safely ejected.

28 September
A United States Marine Corps F-35B belonging to the Fighter Attack Training Squadron VMFAT-501, crashed near the city of Beaufort. The pilot managed to successfully eject.

=== October ===
10 October
A Slovak Air Force Aero L-39 Albatros crashed near the Sliač Air Base into an empty area, due to the engine failure. Both pilots managed to successfully eject.

11 October
A Belgian Air Force F-16AM caught fire at the Florennes Air Base during a routine ground maintenance, injuring one technician and damaging another two aircraft on the ground. The aircraft was reportedly hit by the 20 mm M61 Vulcan cannon, accidentally activated on another F-16. The damage on the aircraft is beyond repair.

16 October
A Ukrainian Air Force Su-27UB crashed during the "Clear Sky 2018" military exercise held at the Starokostiantyniv Air Base, Khmelnytskyi Oblast. The aircraft was flown by a Ukrainian pilot Colonel Ivan Petrenko while the second seat was occupied by a 144th Fighter Wing member of the California Air National Guard. Both pilots died.

18 October
A French NHIndustries NH90 crashed while taking off from the Dixmude (L9015) helicopter carrier, injuring four sailors on the flight deck. The incident took place as the vessel was en route to take part in NATO exercise "Trident Juncture 18".

A Russian Air Force Aero L-39 Albatros crashed into the water near the village of Dolzhanskaya, Krasnodar Krai while performing a scheduled training flight. The fate of the pilots remains unknown.

19 October
A USN Sikorsky SH-60 Seahawk crashed shortly after takeoff aboard the USS Ronald Reagan aircraft carrier during routine operations in the Philippine Sea, injuring 12 sailors.

20 October
A Colombian Sikorsky UH-60 Black Hawk crashed in the southwestern Cauca Department when on an anti-drug mission, killing all four crew members.

=== November ===
12 November
A USN F/A-18F Super Hornet belonging to the Carrier Air Wing Five of the USS Ronald Reagan aircraft carrier, crashed due to a mechanical failure while performing routine operations in the Philippine Sea. Both pilots managed to eject and were rescued back to the ship.

13 November
A USAF Northrop T-38 Talon of the 87th Flying Training Squadron crashed due to unspecified reasons at the Laughlin Air Force Base, Texas. The pilot, Capt. John Graziano, was killed, while the second pilot, Capt. Mark Palyok, survived with injuries.

=== December ===
6 December
A KC-130 and an F/A-18, both or from Marine Corps Air Station Iwakuni, collided in mid-air off the coast of Japan during regularly scheduled training. Two Marines were rescued after the crash, with one dying. Five Marines were not found after a search and rescue operation, bringing up the death count to six Marines.

15 December
A Ukrainian Air Force Su-27 crashed on landing, when returning from a routine training mission in the Zhytomyr Oblast. Killing the pilot.

== 2019 ==
=== January ===
9 January
French Air Force Dassault Mirage 2000D 667/3-JZ crashes near Mignovillard in the Jura region of eastern France during a low-altitude training mission, killing both pilots.

21 January
A Dutch F-16 training at the Vliehors shooting range in Vlieland struck itself with its own ammunition, forcing an emergency landing at Leeuwarden Air Base.

28 January
An Indian Air Force SEPECAT Jaguar crashed shortly after takeoff in Uttar Pradesh. The pilot ejects safely.

=== February ===
1 February
An Indian Air Force Dassault Mirage 2000TI crashes shortly after takeoff at Bangalore, Karnataka during a test flight; both pilots ejected, but did not survive.

10 February
An Ethiopian Mil Mi-8, ET2015, crashes in a UN compound at Abyei, South Sudan, with 23 on board, killing 3.

12 February
An Indian Mikoyan MiG-27 crashed at the Pokhran firing range. The pilot ejects and survives.

19 February
Two Indian Air Force BAE Hawk Mk 132 collide in mid-air while rehearsing for a display at Bengaluru's Aero India show. One pilot was killed, two injured.

26 February
A Mikoyan Mig-21 of the Cuban Revolutionary Air and Air Defence Force crashed in Güira de Melena, Artemisa Province in Cuba. The pilot managed to eject from the plane before it crashed.

27 February
: An Indian Air Force Mil Mi-17V5 crashes at Budgam, near Srinagar, killing the 6 IAF personal on board, and a civilian on the ground. Later it was revealed that the helicopter had been shot down by Indian SAM (surface to air missile) station.: An Indian Air Force Mikoyan MiG-21 piloted by Wing Commander Abhinandan Varthaman was shot down by Pakistan Air Force. The aircraft crashed on the Pakistani side of the Line of Control. The pilot was captured and later released.

=== March ===
5 March
Royal Thai Air Force Fairchild AU-23 Peacemaker 42079 suffered engine problem and crash landed in Khlong Hoi Khong district, Songkhla province. Three occupants received minor injuries.

8 March
An Indian Air Force Mikoyan MiG-21 crashes near Bikaner, western Rajasthan following a bird strike, the pilot ejects safely.

12 March

A PLANAF jet fighter, probably a Xian JH-7, crashes in Ledong County, Hainan province, the two occupants die in the crash.

13 March
An Algerian Air Force Aero L-39 Albatros crashed near Sidi Ghanem, Oran. The two occupants died.

30 March
A U.S. Marine Corps AH-1Z Viper attack helicopter crashes outside of Marine Corps Air Station Yuma in Yuma, Arizona. Both pilots die in the crash.

31 March
An Indian Mikoyan MiG-27 UPG crashes in Sirohi, Rajasthan, the pilot ejects safely.

=== April ===
9 April
JASDF Lockheed Martin F-35A Lightning II 79-8705 crashes into the Pacific Ocean off northern Japan during a training mission with three other aircraft. Some debris from the aircraft is found that night and some human remains were recovered on June 7 from the ocean floor. Reports released on June 10 and August 9 attribute the cause to spatial disorientation. All 12 (and a partially completed 14th) JASDF F-35As are temporarily grounded following the crash.

=== May ===
17 May
An U.S. Air Force F-16 crashed into a warehouse near the March Air Reserve Base in Perris, California. The pilot ejected before impact, and the small fire that broke out was quickly suppressed.

24 May
Mexican Navy Mil Mi-17 ANX-2206 crashes near Jalpan de Serra, Querétaro, while fighting a fire, killing six including five members of the Navy crew and an inspector with the National Forestry Commission.

25 May
A U.S. Army Boeing CH-47 Chinook is destroyed following a hard landing in Helmand, Afghanistan. Passengers and crew on the board survived and sustained injuries.

=== June ===
3 June

IAF Antonov An-32 K2752 crashes near Pari Hills in the state of Arunachal Pradesh after losing contact with ground control leading to death of all 13 members on board. Wreckage was located on June 11 by a Mil Mi-17.

24 June
German Air Force Eurofighter Typhoon 30+48 collides with German Air Force Eurofighter Typhoon 30+55 near Müritz, Mecklenburg-Vorpommern. Both pilots eject but only one survives. Both aircraft were of TLG73.

28 June
Indonesian Army Mil Mi-17V-5 HA-5138 crashed at an altitude of 12,500 ft (3,800 m) in the mountainous terrains of Bintang Mountains Regency, Papua Province. All twelve occupants were killed.

=== July ===
11 July
Royal Thai Air Force Aero L-39ZA Albatros 41121 crashed in Saraphi district, Chiang Mai province. One of the pilot died, the other one was injured.

25 July
Dassault/Dornier Alpha Jet E F-UHRR of Patrouille de France overruns the runway at Perpignan Airport. The pilot ejects and survives.

31 July
US Navy Boeing F/A-18E Super Hornet of VFA-151 strikes the wall of the Star Wars Canyon in Death Valley National Park during a low-altitude training mission, killing the pilot. Seven French tourists on the ground are injured. The pilot, Charles Zachary Walker, was posthumously promoted to lieutenant commander.

=== August ===
2 August
Royal Malaysian Air Force Sikorsky S-61A-4 Nuri M23-16, c/n 61783, made an emergency landing in Kedah and was badly damaged. All four crew and eleven passengers were injured.

8 August
An IAF Sukhoi Su-30MKI crashes minutes after take-off, pilots eject safely. A Sukhoi-30 fighter jet of the Indian Air Force that had taken off on a training sortie on Thursday evening has crashed, an IAF official said.

26 August
Spanish Air Force CASA C-101 E.25 Mirlo crashes into the sea in front of "La Manga", Region of Murcia, killing the pilot and member of aerobatic demonstration team Patrulla Águila.

=== September ===
18 September
Spanish Air Force ENAER T-35 Pillán E.26 Tamiz crashes into the sea shortly after taking off from San Javier airbase in Region of Murcia. Both the instructor and the student die.

=== October ===
2 October

A Boeing B-17G Flying Fortress, registration N93012, "Nine-O-Nine" (former 44-83575), crashes while attempting to land at Bradley International Airport, Connecticut during an air show after the pilot reported a problem with the No. 4 engine, killing seven of 13 on board (including both pilots) and injuring one person on the ground. Aircraft burns out with only the left wing and tail intact. The aircraft was painted to represent the original Nine-O-Nine, B-17G 42-31909.

=== November ===
25 November

Two helicopters of the French Army collided mid-air in the Liptako region of Mali, killing the 13 people aboard both aircraft.

=== December ===
5 December
Minnesota National Guard UH-60 Black Hawk helicopter carrying three Minnesota National Guardsmen crashes near Pearl Lake while conducting a maintenance test flight near Kimball, Minnesota. Minnesota Governor Tim Walz later confirmed that all three guardsmen were killed in the crash.

24 December
A Sukhoi Su-57, the first serial aircraft (bort number "01 blue"), crashed 110–120 km away from the Dzyomgi Airport, Khabarovsk Krai, during the final stage of its factory trials due to malfunction of the control system. The pilot ejected and was recovered by helicopter. According to TASS, the test flight was carried out at the altitude of 8,000 meters when the malfunction occurred, causing the airplane to enter a rapid spiral descent. When all attempts to stabilize the airplane into a horizontal flight using the manual flight control system failed, the pilot ejected at the altitude of 2,000 meters.

== See also ==
- Lists of accidents and incidents involving military aircraft
