= 173rd Brigade =

173rd Brigade may refer to:

- 173rd (3/1st London) Brigade, United Kingdom
- 173rd Airborne Brigade, United States

== See also ==
- 173rd Brigade Support Battalion (Airborne)
- Special Troops Battalion, 173rd Airborne Brigade Combat Team
- 173rd Regiment (disambiguation)
