= 601st =

601st may refer to:

- 601st (City of Bristol) (Mixed) Heavy Anti-Aircraft Regiment, Royal Artillery, a Volunteer unit of the British Army from 1859 to 1955
- 601st (Harwich) Fortress Company, Royal Engineers, a volunteer unit of Britain's Royal Engineers formed to defend the Essex coast
- 601st (The West Yorkshire Regiment) Infantry Regiment, Royal Artillery, a Volunteer unit of the British Army formed in 1859
- 601st Air Operations Center, US operations hub for First Air Force
- 601st Assault Helicopter Battalion, a helicopter unit of the Argentine Army
- 601st Bombardment Squadron Constituted as the 601st Bombardment Squadron (Heavy) on 15 February 1943
- 601st Communications Grouping (Argentina) (Agr Com 601), an Argentine Army signals military grouping
- 601st Engineer Grouping (Argentina) (Agr Ing 601), an Argentine Army Engineer grouping
- 601st Intelligence Battalion, a special military intelligence service of the Argentine Army
- 601st Naval Air Group, a carrier air group of the Imperial Japanese Navy (IJN) during World War II
- 601st Quartermaster Company, Aerial Delivery Support Company of the United States Army based in Aviano, Italy
- 601st Special Forces Group, a special forces unit of the Czech Armed Forces
- 601st Squadron (JASDF), a squadron of the Airborne Early Warning Surveillance Group of the Japan Air Self-Defense Force
- 601st Tactical Control Wing, provisional United States Air Force organization
- 601st Tank Destroyer Battalion, battalion of the United States Army active during World War II
- The 601st Phone Call (第601个电话), a 2006 Chinese drama film

== See also ==
- 601 (number)
- 601 (disambiguation)
- 601, the year 601 (DCI) of the Julian calendar
- 601 BC
