= 601 (disambiguation) =

601 may refer to:

- 601 AD, (The year)
- CCIR 601, Interlaced Analog to Digital Video encoding standard (AKA: ITU-R BT.601 )
- PowerPC 601, a microprocessor shipped by the AIM alliance in 1993
- Peugeot 601, a range-topping car
- Tatra 601 Monte Carlo, a sports car

== See also ==
- 601st (disambiguation)
