= 173rd Brigade Support Battalion (Airborne) =

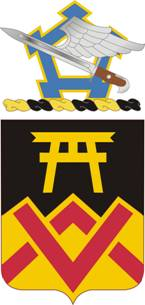
- 173rd Brigade Support Battalion coat of arms
- Active: 1963-1972; 2005-2006; 17 September 2007 - present
- Country: United States of America
- Branch: United States Army
- Type: Support Battalion
- Role: Support
- Size: Battalion
- Part of: 173rd Airborne Brigade Combat Team
- Garrison/HQ: Caserma Del Din, Vicenza, Italy
- Nickname: Repel
- Motto: To Our Utmost
- Colors: Silver, Blue & Yellow
- Decorations: Presidential Unit Citation Streamer embroidered DAKTO, Meritorious Unit Commendation Streamer embroidered VIETNAM 1965-1967, Meritorious Unit Commendation Streamer embroidered VIETNAM 1969, Republic of Vietnam Cross of Gallantry with Palm embroidered VIETNAM 1965-1970, Republic of Vietnam Civil Action Honor Medal Streamer embroidered VIETNAM 1969-1971

Commanders
- Battalion Commander: LTC Rhonda M. Booth
- Command Sergeant Major: CSM Gerardo Moran

Insignia
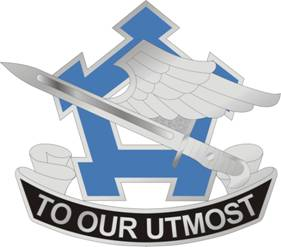
- Distinctive unit insignia

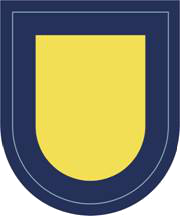
- Unit flash

The 173rd Brigade Support Battalion (Airborne) is a subordinate unit of the 173rd Infantry Brigade Combat Team (Airborne) in the United States Army based in Vicenza, Italy.

== Organization ==
The 173rd Brigade Support Battalion (Airborne) serves to support the 173rd Infantry Brigade Combat Team (Airborne). The battalion currently consists of 475 soldiers in a headquarters and headquarters company (HHC), a supply company, maintenance company, medical company, parachute rigging company, and an aerial delivery detachment. Five additional forward support companies are detached in support of the Brigade's other subordinate units.

=== Light Support Battalion ===
- Brigade Headquarters and Headquarters Company – Headhunter (Brigade Staff & Command Group)
- Headquarters and Distribution Company – Vanguard (Battalion Staff, Command Group, and distribution assets)
  - 744th Quartermaster Detachment (Brigade Parachute Office)
- A Company — Bandit (Maintenance & Supply)
- B Company — Lifeline (Brigade Support Medical Company)
- C Company — Raven (Signal)
- D Company — Danger (Military Intelligence)
- F Company — Kingsman (formally the 601st Quartermaster Company; parachute packing, aerial delivery, & airborne operation support)

=== Combat Logistic Companies (CLC) ===
- F Battery – Fury (in support of 4-319th Airborne Field Artillery Regiment)
- C Company – Gamble (in support of 1st Battalion, 503rd Parachute Infantry Regiment
- D Company – Hound (in support of 2nd Battalion, 503rd Parachute Infantry Regiment
- E Company – Joker (in support of 3rd Battalion, 504th Infantry Regiment

== History of the 173rd Brigade Support Battalion (Airborne) ==
The 173rd Support Battalion was constituted on 26 March 1963 in the Regular Army and assigned to the 173rd Airborne Brigade. Officially activated on 25 June 1963 in Okinawa, the Support Battalion participated and logistically supported hundreds of Brigade operations in a dozen different countries in the Pacific. In May 1965, the Support Battalion was sent to Vietnam with the Brigade. For its time in Southeast Asia, the 173rd Support Battalion is recognized as having participated in 15 separate campaigns in Vietnam. The Battalion received a Presidential Unit Citation, two Meritorious Unit Commendations, and a Republic of Vietnam Cross of Gallantry with palm streamer and a Republic of Vietnam Civil Action Honor Medal. On 14 January 1972, the Support Battalion was relieved from assignment to the 173rd Airborne Brigade and subsequently deactivated.

In July 2004, Lt. Col. Cynthia L. Fox was tasked with combining the Headquarters and Headquarters Company, 51st Maintenance Battalion located in Mannheim, Germany and 501st Forward Support Company & Headquarters located in Vicenza, Italy to begin the activation of the 173rd Support Battalion. This was achieved on 16 March 2005. Eight days later, the 173rd Support Battalion deployed to Kandahar, Afghanistan to provide combat service support to Combined Task Force Bayonet. The Battalion redeployed on 24 February 2006 after spending twelve months supporting combat operations in southern Afghanistan.

As a part of the 173rd Airborne Brigade's transformation, the 173rd Support Battalion transitioned into a Brigade Support Battalion (BSB) and moved to Bamberg, Germany on 16 September 2006 to begin training for their deployment to Afghanistan. On 17 May 2007, the newly transformed 173rd BSB (Airborne) deployed to Bagram and Jalalabad Airfields in northeastern Afghanistan. The Battalion redeployed on 4 August 2008 after spending 15 months supporting combat operations throughout Regional Command East in Afghanistan.

On 22 February 2009, the Battalion was notified of a change to their deployment from Operation Iraqi Freedom to Operation Enduring Freedom. In November 2009, the Sky Soldiers of the 173rd BSB were deployed to Forward Operating Base Shank, Logar, Afghanistan in support of Operation Enduring Freedom X and The global war on terrorism. The unit performed its mission of manning, arming, fueling, fixing, moving and sustaining over 10,000 Soldiers, Sailors, Airmen, Marines, civilian contractors, and other government agencies throughout Logar and Wardak provinces of Regional Command-East (RC East), Afghanistan. The Battalion redeployed from combat operations in November 2010.

In July 2013, the 173rd BSB deployed for a fourth time since its 2005 reactivation. This time, BSB Paratroopers deployed from Bamberg, Germany as part of Task Force Repel, back to Afghanistan and Regional Command – East, as a subordinate element of Task Force Bayonet conducting Security Force Assistance and Training (SFAT) Operations in support of Operation Enduring Freedom XIII. The Battalion aligned a forward logistics element in Wardak Province, Afghanistan and the remainder of the battalion at Forward Operating Base Shank, Logar Province Afghanistan, where they executed the difficult task of reducing the footprint of the Brigade and retrograding critical military material while continuing to train their Afghan counterparts.

The Battalion redeployed from combat operations in March 2013 and immediately began preparations to relocate from Bamberg, Germany to Vicenza, Italy to the newly completed Caserma Del Din where the Sky Soldiers of the 173rd BSB continue the distinction of honored service dating back to Vietnam and proudly represent the Airborne fighting spirit wherever they serve.

- Constituted 26 March 1963 in the Regular Army as the 173rd Support Battalion, and assigned to the 173rd Airborne Brigade
- Activated 25 June 1963 on Okinawa
- Relieved 14 January 1972 from assignment to the 173rd Airborne Brigade
- Inactivated 21 October 1972 at Fort Campbell, Kentucky
- Activated 16 March 2005 in Vicenza, Italy
- Deployed to Afghanistan From March 2005 to March 2006
- On 17 September 2007 the unit was activated as a Brigade Support Battalion and relocated to Bamberg, Germany
- Deployed to Afghanistan for a second time from May 2007 to August 2008
- Deployed to Afghanistan for a third time from November 2009 to November 2010
- Deployed to Afghanistan for a fourth time from July 2012 to March 2013
- During July & August 2013, relocated from Bamberg, Germany to Vicenza, Italy

== Honors ==
=== Unit decorations ===
Ribbon	Award	Year	Notes
	Presidential Unit Citation (Army)	1967	for fighting in the Battle of Dak To
	Meritorious Unit Commendation (Army)	1965–67	for service in Vietnam
	Meritorious Unit Commendation (Army)	1969	for service in Vietnam
	Meritorious Unit Commendation (Army)	2007-2008	for service in support of Operation Enduring Freedom DAGO 2019-03 DAGO 2013-28
	Meritorious Unit Commendation (Army)	2009-2010	for service in support of Operation Enduring Freedom DAGO 2013-26
	Meritorious Unit Commendation (Army)	2012-2013	for service in support of Operation Enduring Freedom DAGO 2018-08
	Republic of Vietnam Cross of Gallantry with Palm	1965–70	for service in Vietnam
	Republic of Vietnam Civil Action Honor Medal, First Class	1969–71	for service in Vietnam

=== Forward Support Company Unit decorations ===
Ribbon	Award	Year	Company	Notes
	Valorous Unit Award	2007–2008	E Company	DAGO 2013-12
	Valorous Unit Award	2008	F Company	DAGO 2013-10
	Presidential Unit Citation (Army)	2007	F Company	DAGO 2013-07
	Meritorious Unit Commendation (Army)	2009-2010	F Company	DAGO 2013-50
	Meritorious Unit Commendation (Army)	2012-2013	F Company	DAGO 2014-52
	Meritorious Unit Commendation (Army)	2009-2010	D Company	DAGO 2014-17
	Meritorious Unit Commendation (Army)	2009-2010	E Company	DAGO 2013-20
	Meritorious Unit Commendation (Army)	2007-2008	G Company	DAGO 2013-82

== Former Commanders ==
- LTC James M. Staigers, Commander from 1964 to 1966
- LTC Cynthia L. Fox, Commander from 6 July 2004 to 4 May 2006
- LTC James R. Ryan, Commander from 4 May 2006 to 26 September 2008
- LTC Curtis A. Johnson, Commander from 26 September 2008 to 23 May 2011
- LTC Luis A. Velez, Commander from 23 May 2011 to 19 June 2013
- LTC Jon P. Beale, Commander from 19 June 2013 to 17 June 2015
- LTC Jeffrey L. Reibestein, Commander from 17 June 2015 to 28 June 2017
- LTC Christopher W. Baker, Commander from 28 June 2017 to 6 June 2019
- LTC Nathan A. Strohm, Commander from 6 June 2019 to 14 June 2021
- LTC Anthony P. Newman, Commander from 14 June 2021 to 20 June 2023
- LTC Ryan T. Hulse, Commander from 20 June 2023 to 13 June 2025

== Former Command Sergeant Majors ==
- CSM Kenneth J. Barteau, Command from July 2004 to May 2006
- CSM Samuel C. Smith, Command from May 2006 to March 2008
- CSM Jimmy J. Sellers, Command from March 2008 to May 2011
- ICSM Richard A. Carullo, Command from May 2011 to Jan 2012
- CSM David Franco, Command from 4 January 2012 to 4 June 2013
- CSM Kurt L. Reed, Command from 4 June 2013 to 26 September 2014
- CSM Todd M. Burke, Command from 26 September 2014 to 13 December 2016
- CSM James A. Lafratta, Command from 13 December 2016 to 26 February 2019
- CSM Felicia D. Rodriguez, Command from 26 February 2019 to 30 September 2020
- CSM Asgar Kamaludeen, Command from 30 September 2020 to 22 March 2023
- CSM Olanrewaju T. Anibaba, Command from 22 March 2023 to 24 March 2025
