= 2015 Jalalabad USAF C-130J crash =

2015 aviation accident in Afghanistan

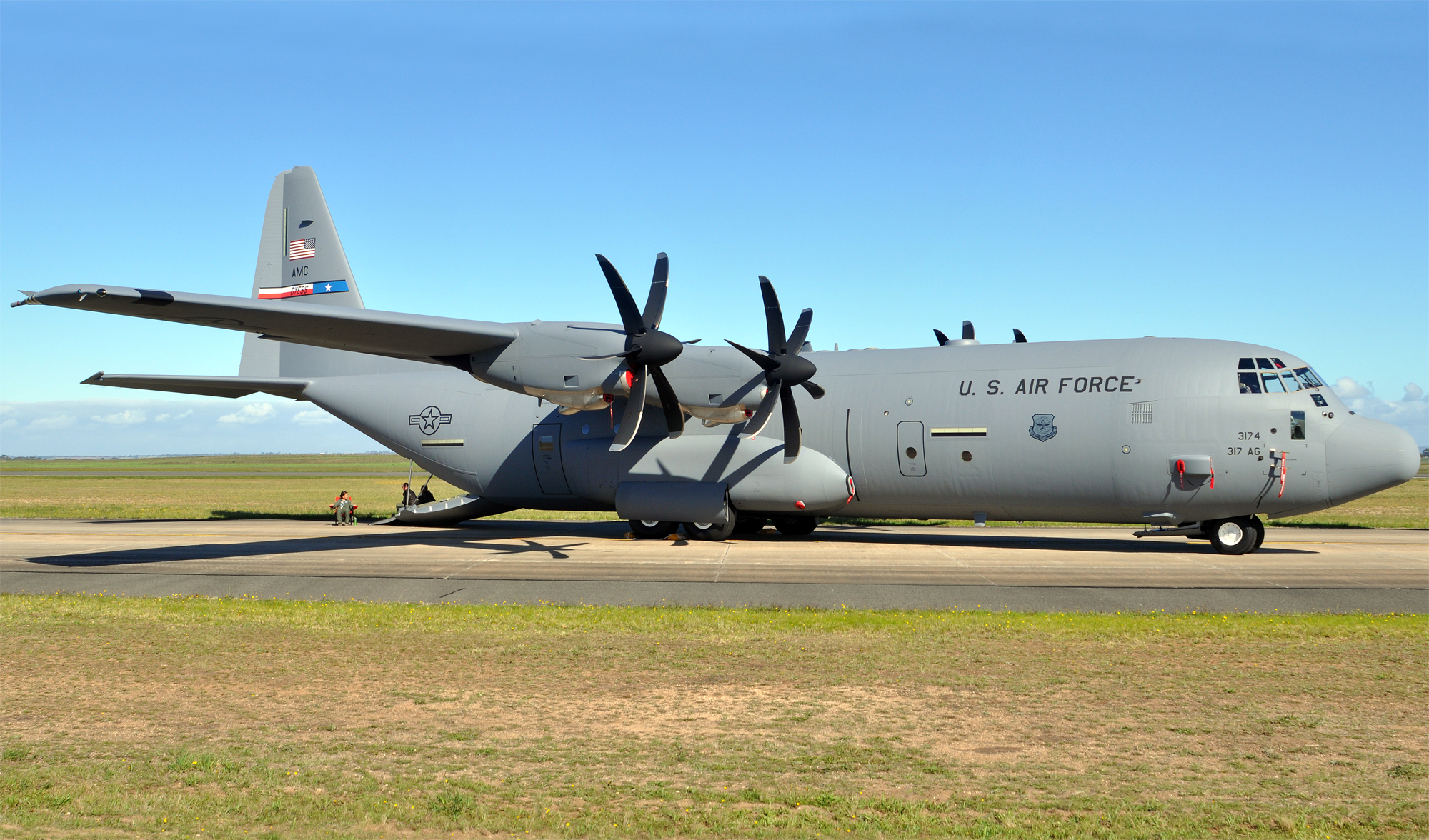
- 08-3174, the aircraft involved, seen here in 2011

Accident
- Date: October 2, 2015
- Summary: Crashed shortly after takeoff
- Site: Jalalabad Airport, Jalalabad, Afghanistan
- Total fatalities: 14

Aircraft
- Aircraft type: Lockheed Martin C-130J Super Hercules
- Operator: United States Air Force
- Call sign: TORQUE 62
- Registration: 08-3174
- Flight origin: Bagram Airfield, Bagram, Afghanistan
- Stopover: Jalalabad Airport, Jalalabad, Afghanistan
- Destination: Bagram Airfield, Bagram, Afghanistan
- Occupants: 11
- Passengers: 5
- Crew: 6
- Fatalities: 11
- Survivors: 0

Ground casualties
- Ground fatalities: 3

On October 2, 2015, a Lockheed Martin C-130J Super Hercules of the United States Air Force operated by the 317th Airlift Group and the 455th Air Expeditionary Wing, crashed only 28 seconds after takeoff from Jalalabad Airport, Jalalabad, Afghanistan, killing all 11 occupants on board. A further three were killed on the ground where the C-130 crashed.

== Background ==
=== Aircraft ===
The aircraft involved, manufactured in 2011, was a Lockheed Martin C-130J Super Hercules registered as 08-3174 with serial number 5648. It was equipped with four Allison AE2100D3 propellers and, in its four years of service, it had logged 2551.7 airframe hours. The aircraft was assigned to the 317th Airlift Group.

=== Previous flight ===
On October 1, 2015, at 21:36 Afghan Time, when the C-130J was departing Bagram Airfield for Jalalabad, the flight experienced a bird strike. It returned to Bagram for a mechanical inspection before again departing Bagram at 22:53 Afghan time. During the approach, fireworks were present around the area but no evasive actions were taken. The flight touched-down at Jalalabad safely at 23:13 Afghan time.

=== On ground ===
While off-loading cargo at Jalalabad Airport, the pilots pitched the elevators up by pulling back the yoke since it helps clear the elevators from off-loading tall cargo. After a while, while still pulling back the yoke by hand, one of the pilots placed one of the hard-shell night vision goggle (NVG) at the front of the yoke to hold it at a raised position. Since the flight crew were distracted performing the engine running onload (ERO) checklist and since the pilots were wearing night vision goggles (NVGS), which in-terms restricts vision, the flight crew eventually forgot about the NVG pitching the yoke upwards. Since the ERO checklist did not require the flight crew to review the yoke, it was up to the flight crew to remember to remove the NVG from its position.

== Accident ==
After completing the ERO checklist, the flight crew taxied to the active runway and backtracked down the runway to runway 31. The air traffic controller reported winds at three knots from a heading of 220°. The takeoff roll was initiated at 00:15:24 Afghan time. At 00:15:50, after the captain said "rotate", the aircraft lifted off at a speed of 107.5 knots. Four seconds later, the co-pilot, who was the pilot-flying (PF), stated that the aircraft was "going off on its own". The co-pilot figured out that there was something wrong with the aircraft and incorrectly pointed out that there was a trim tab malfunction. The flight reached a top airspeed of 117 knots.

As a result of misunderstanding the problem, the pilots executed an incorrect procedure. They applied a full nose-down trim to attempt to lower the nose to prevent a stall. Nonetheless, the aircraft continued to pitch up. At 00:16:01, the first stall warning occurred with a 20° nose-up position, with wings level at an airspeed of 115 knots. One second later, the flight entered a stall condition and remained stalled for the remainder of the flight, except a brief moment before impacting the ground. At 00:16:02, while the aircraft continued to pitch up to 25°, the captain, after taking control from the co-pilot, began rolling the aircraft to the right and about a second later, the stick pusher was activated, which had no additional effect because of the blocking NVG, and a second stall warning was issued while the nose continued to pitch up to 35°.

At 00:16:06, the co-pilot selected the emergency trim, however, this had no additional effect since the main trim system functioned properly. At 00:16:07, a third stall warning was issued and the aircraft reached a peak of an upward pitch of 42°. The captain applied left aileron but, because of the stalled flight condition, the right bank continued to increase to a peak of 75° right bank. At 00:16:13, as the aircraft's nose started to plummet reaching a nose-down pitch of 28°, it began to roll to the left. The nose was again rising but because of the descent rate of 8,000 feet per minute, the aircraft simply had no room to clear terrain. At an airspeed of 112 knots, the aircraft hit the ground instantly killing all 11 people onboard and 3 Afghan Special Reaction Force members on the ground.

After the accident, the Taliban claimed that they shot down the aircraft from the sky. However, this was immediately ruled-out.

== Cause ==
On April 15, 2016, the Air Mobility Command, a major command of the United States Air Force (USAF), released the final report of this accident. The cause of the accident was founded to be pilot error. The captain's fateful decision to place a hard-shell night vision goggle (NVG) at the front of the yoke to hold it at a raised position and the distraction the captain and the co-pilot faced during the engine running onload (ERO) checklist and the eventual forgetfulness of off-loading the NVG from the yoke were some of the reasons why. Because both the pilots were wearing night vision goggles, it restricted vision which prevented the pilots from noticing their mistake. Another reason which significantly contributed to the accident was the pilots misjudging what kind of error they were facing and executing the incorrect procedure to solve the problem.
