= 601st Quartermaster Company =

U.S. military unit

- Active: 1951–1958 2016 - Present
- Country: United States of America
- Branch: United States Army
- Type: Aerial Delivery Support Company
- Role: Support
- Size: Company
- Part of: 173rd Airborne Brigade Combat Team
- Garrison/HQ: Aviano Air Base, Aviano, Italy
- Nickname: Pack Mules
- Mascot: Pack Mule
- Anniversaries: 10 Dec 1951 (Activation) 6 Oct 2016 (Reactivation)

Commanders
- Company Commander: CPT
- First Sergeant: 1SG

Insignia
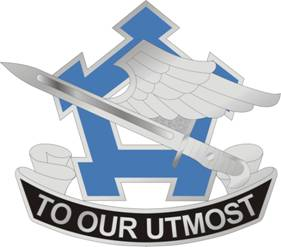
- Distinctive unit insignia

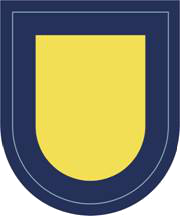
- Unit flash

The 601st Quartermaster Company is an Aerial Delivery Support Company of the United States Army based in Aviano, Italy. It is a subordinate unit of the 173rd Support Battalion (United States). The members are primarily Parachute Riggers who are responsible for the packing, storage, maintenance and issuing of both personnel and heavy drop aerial delivery support.

== Organization ==
The 601st Quartermaster Company serves to support the 173rd Infantry Brigade Combat Team (Airborne). The Company currently consists of over 100 soldiers in two Platoons and a Headquarters Section.

=== 601st Quartermaster Company ===
- Pack Platoon
- Heavy Drop Platoon
- Headquarters Section
- Issue and Receiving Section
- Maintenance Section

=== History ===
The 601st Quartermaster Aerial Supply Company was activated on 10 December 1951 at Fort Campbell, Kentucky and formed from personnel of the 11th Airborne Division. The first Unit Commander was Captain Edward G. Stanford. During this time, there were three types of Aerial Delivery companies; Aerial Supply, Parachute Maintenance, and Air Equipment Repair. The 601st Quartermaster Aerial Supply Company's mission was to train and execute heavy airdrop missions and conduct re-supply operations from airdrop platforms or containers, by lashing them to the inside of the aircraft and properly ejecting them over the drop zone. This type of unit was designed to provide continued air supply to troops cut off from ground re-supply. The 601st supported re-supply operations during the Korean War. With the war in Korea, "logistic by parachute" became an established part of supporting combat operations. The poor weather, lack of road and rail networks and the brutal terrain created huge obstacles to ground resupply missions. Korea marked the first large scale use of aerial resupply, heavy drop and the standardization of airdrop procedures and units. During this war the C-54, C-119 and the C-47 cargo planes were used for air drops supported by the 601st.

Upon the deactivation of the 11th Airborne Division in 1958, the 601st Quartermaster Aerial Supply Company ceased support operations until 6 October 2016, as it re-activates to support the 173rd Airborne Brigade Combat Team. The 601st Quartermaster Company was reactivated on 6 October 2016 at an activation ceremony held on Aviano Air Base.

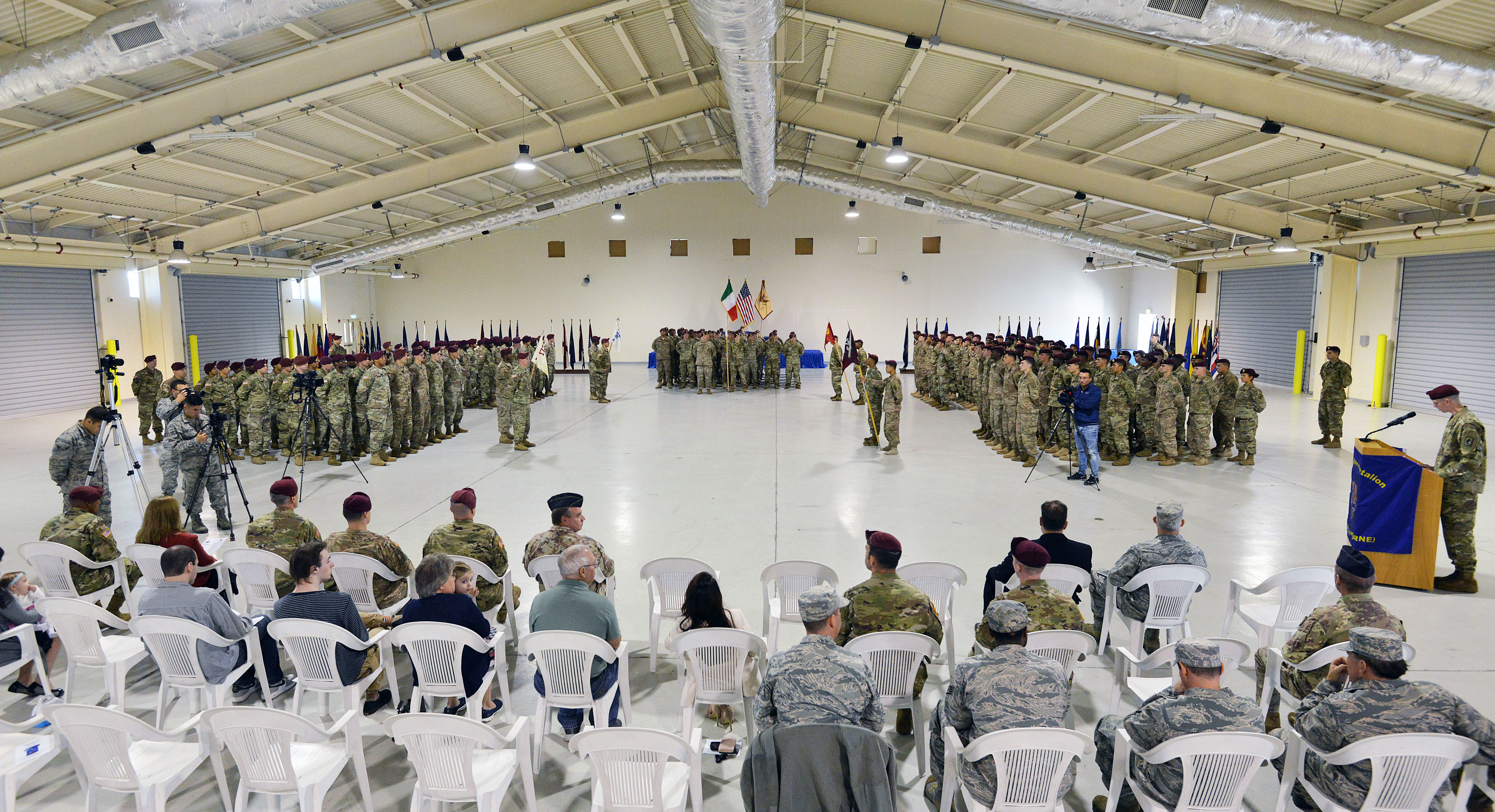
601st Quartermaster Company Reactivation ceremony at Aviano Air Base in Aviano, Italy, 6 Oct 2016

The activation ceremony was held at Aviano Air Base and was officiated by then-Battalion Commander of the 173rd Brigade Support Battalion (Airborne). The Unit previously supported the 173rd Airborne Brigade Combat Team (Airborne) as the Aerial Delivery Support Platoon as part of HHC, 173rd Brigade Support Battalion (Airborne).

== Support Operations ==
The 601st Quartermaster Company's history of logistical support operations dates back to aerial delivery support during the Korean War.

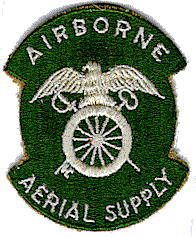
Pocket Patch Worn by various Aerial Delivery units in the 1950s, including the 601st

The 601st Quartermaster Company provides aerial delivery support as the Brigade is the U.S. Army's Contingency Response Force in Europe, providing rapid forces to the United States European, Africa and Central Commands areas of responsibilities. Forward-based in Italy and Germany, the Brigade routinely trains alongside NATO allies and partners to build interoperability and strengthen the Alliance.

The 601st Quartermaster Company supports airborne operations all across Europe in multiple capacities through personnel parachutes and equipment/ platform drops. The 601st Parachute Riggers have provided premier aerial delivery support throughout Europe while simultaneously making history as the first brigade to successfully airdrop a M777 howitzer from a Heavy Airlift Wing C-17 for the first time in Europe.

The 601st Gryphons support airborne operations throughout the European Theatre in various countries. Notably, the 601st Quartermaster Company supported airborne operations and provided aerial delivery support during Operation Atlantic Resolve in Latvia.

The 601st Quartermaster Company made international headlines when 3 vehicle platforms were airdropped during an airborne operation in April 2016. Numerous platforms were being dropped in support of Saber Junction 16 when 3 of the vehicle platforms fell to the ground in what has been concluded as tampered with and compromised equipment. After the conclusion of over a year long investigation, the soldier charged in connection with the spectacular destruction last year of three Humvees that slipped free from their parachutes during a drop and plummeted to earth was a Germany-based soldier from the Brigade. The incident has been deemed not due to any actions from parachute riggers but due to compromised platforms and equipment from Sergeant John Skipper. The investigation also led to the reprimand of one soldier who recorded a video and is heard laughing in the video that went viral internationally following the incident on 11 April 2016.
