= Jalalabad Airport =

Jalalabad Airport Pashto: د جلال آباد هوايي ډګر
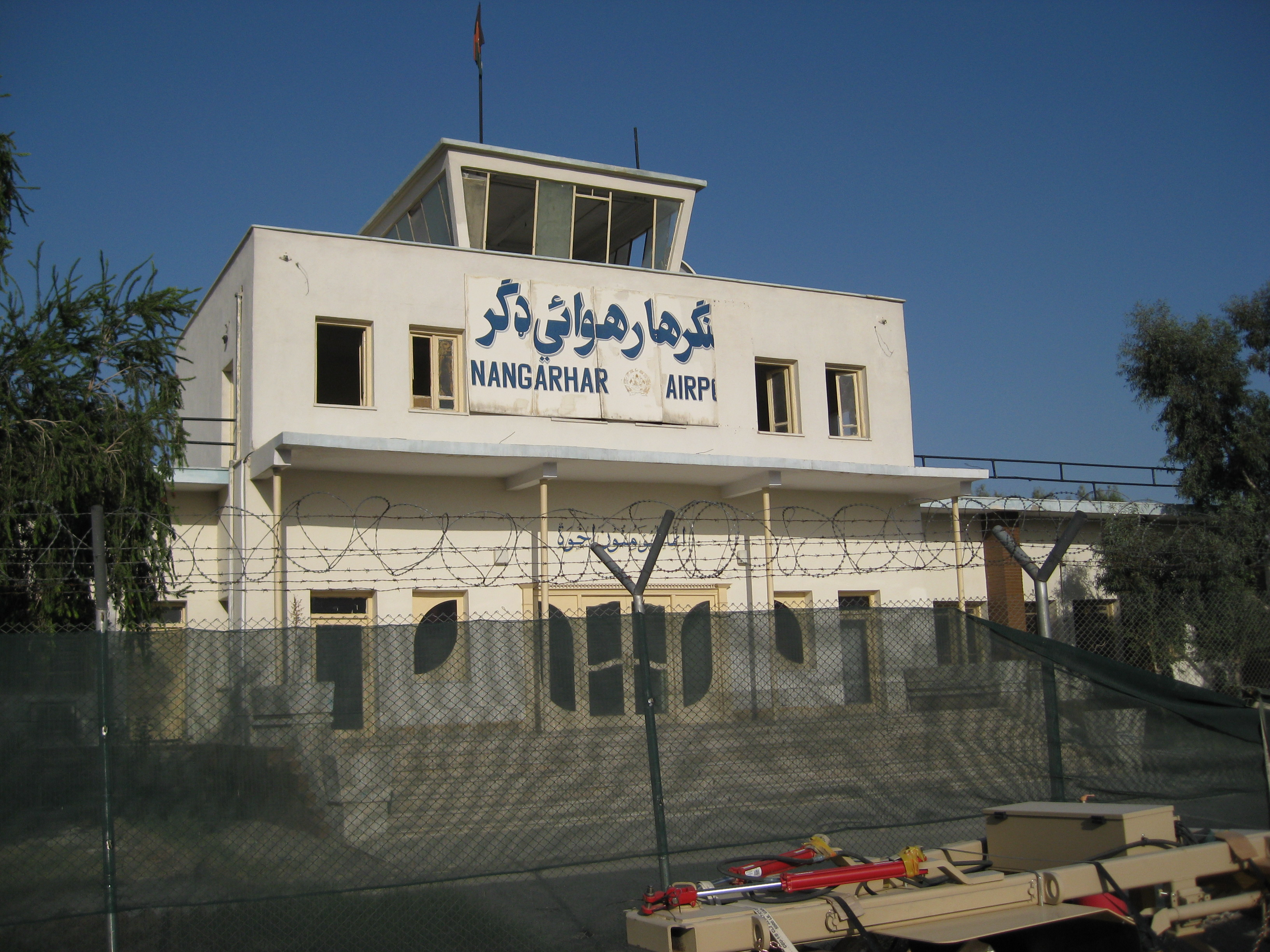
- View of the airport's control tower in 2008
- IATA: JAA; ICAO: OAJL

Summary
- Airport type: Public / Military
- Owner: Afghanistan
- Operator: Ministry of Transport and Civil Aviation; Ministry of Defense
- Serves: Nangarhar Province
- Location: Jalalabad, Afghanistan
- Built: 1960s
- Elevation AMSL: 1,840 ft / 561 m
- Coordinates: 34°24′01″N 70°29′54″E

Map
- Location of airport in Afghanistan

Runways
Direction	Length		Surface
Direction	ft	m	Surface
13/31	7,260	2,213	Asphalt
- Source: Google Earth, Landings.com, AIP Afghanistan

Jalalabad Airport (Pashto: د جلال اباد هوايي ډګر; IATA: JAA, ICAO: OAJL), also known as Nangarhar Airport, and referred to as Jalalabad Airfield (JAF) by the U.S. military during the War in Afghanistan, is located next to the Kabul–Jalalabad Road, about 3 miles (4.8 km) southeast of Jalalabad, which is the capital of Nangarhar Province in Afghanistan. It is a domestic airport under the country's Ministry of Transport and Civil Aviation (MoTCA), and serves the population of not only Nangarhar but also neighboring Kunar, Nuristan and Laghman provinces. It is also used by the Ministry of Defense for military purposes. Security in and around the airport is provided by the Afghan National Security Forces.

Situated at an elevation of 1,840 feet (561 m) above sea level, Jalalabad Airport has one asphalt runway measuring around 7,260 by 140 feet (2,213 m × 43 m). It also has at least 18 helipads, a number of hangars and buildings used for military purposes. The other closest major public Afghan airports to Jalalabad are the Kabul International Airport in neighboring Kabul Province to the west and Khost Airport in Khost Province to the south.

Jalalabad Airport was used in the past by the United States Armed Forces and civilian contractors. They operated out of Forward Operating Base Fenty. Members of the International Security Assistance Force (ISAF) and later Resolute Support Mission (RSM) also used the airport in the past.

== History ==
Work on the airport began in the 1950s when Afghanistan was ruled by King Zahir Shah. It was modernized during the 1960s with United States assistance. During the Soviet–Afghan War, the Soviet Union turned the civilian airport into a military air base, used by an Afghan Mil Mi-24 squadron in Jalalabad. In 1989, the Afghan Interim Government attempted to take the airport in what became the Battle of Jalalabad Airport, later escalating into the Battle of Jalalabad. They were unsuccessful and pushed out by the Afghan Armed Forces. It was recently expanded by NATO forces during their decades-long war with the Taliban.

=== New Jalalabad Airport ===
According to MoTCA, a new airport will be built in the Kuz Kunar District of Nangarhar Province.

== Airlines and destinations ==
Jalalabad Airport handles only domestic flights. According to MoTCA, "there will be three to four flights each week." Between August 2021 and July 2022, there were no scheduled airlines operating at Jalalabad Airport except those operated by the Afghan Air Force and United Nations agencies.

== Accidents and incidents ==
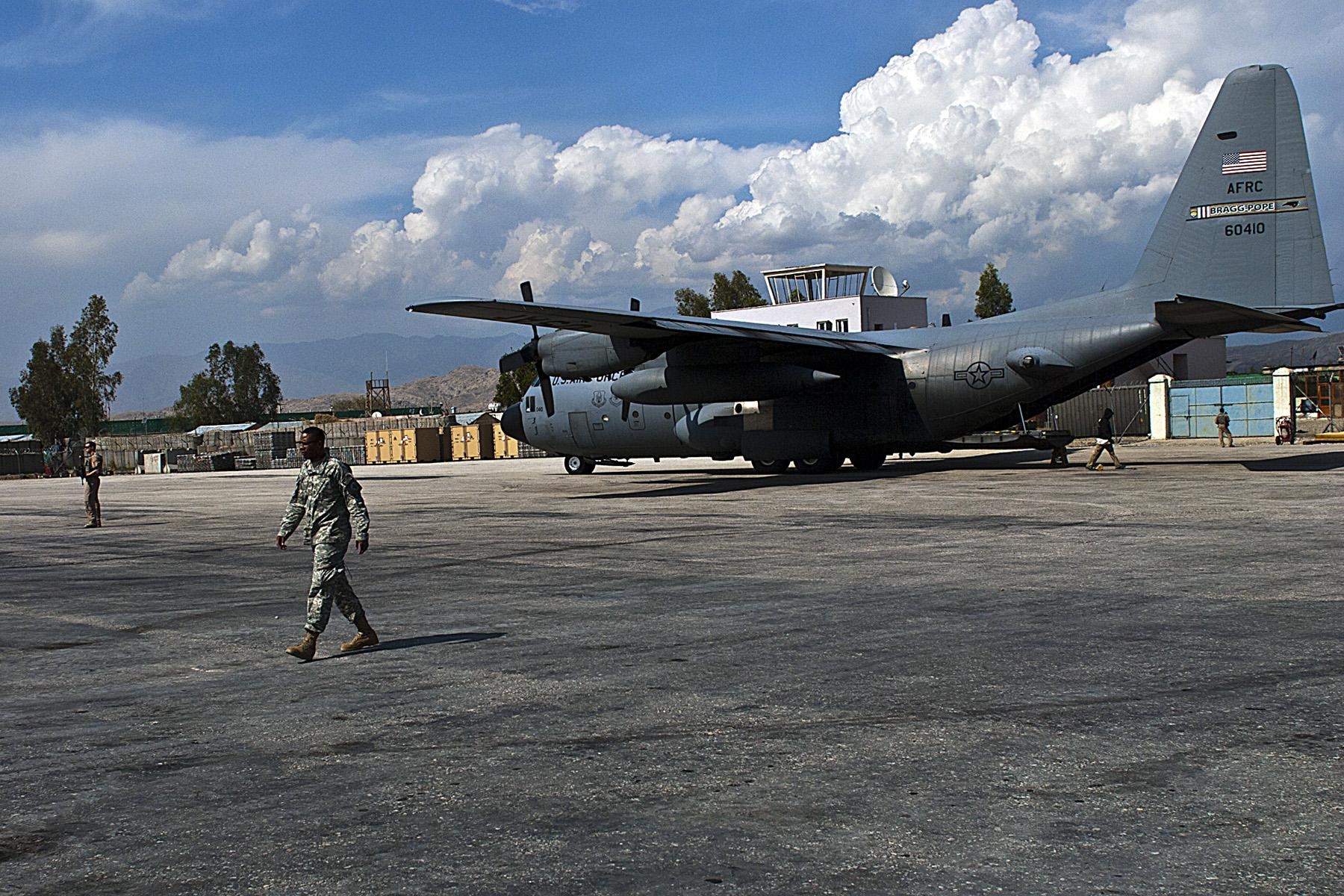
A U.S. Air Force C-130 at Jalalabad Airport in 2011

=== 2010 militant attack ===
On 30 June 2010, a car bomb was set off and insurgents stormed the airport. According to Zabiullah Mujahid, a Taliban spokesman, said the Taliban were responsible and killed 32 Afghan and non-Afghan security forces. According to NATO, there were eight Taliban deaths and one Afghan and one coalition member injured.

=== 2015 aircraft crash ===
14 people, including 6 United States Airmen and 5 passengers and 3 local nationals, were killed when a Lockheed Martin C-130J Super Hercules aircraft crashed shortly after take-off from Jalalabad Airport on 2 October 2015.

== See also ==
- List of airports in Afghanistan
