= List of airports in Algeria =

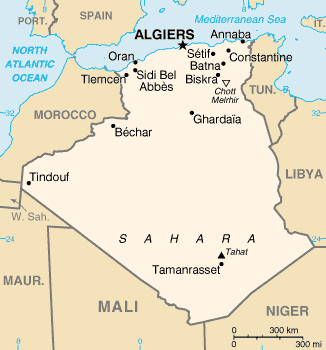
Map of Algeria

This is a list of airports in Algeria, grouped by type and sorted by location.

Algeria, officially known as the People's Democratic Republic of Algeria, is a country located in North Africa. It is the largest country on the Mediterranean Sea, and the African continent, as well as the tenth-largest country in the world in terms of land area. It is bordered by Tunisia in the northeast, Libya in the east, Niger in the southeast, Mali and Mauritania in the southwest, a few kilometers of the Moroccan-controlled Western Sahara in the southwest, Morocco in the west and northwest, and the Mediterranean Sea in the north. Algeria is divided into 58 provinces (wilayas), 553 districts (daïras) and 1,541 communes or municipalities.

== Airports ==
Airport names shown in bold indicate the airport has scheduled service on commercial airlines.

City served	Province	ICAO	IATA	Airport name	Coordinates	AIP/chart	Rating
**International airports**							
Adrar	Adrar	DAUA	AZR	**Touat-Cheikh Sidi Mohamed Belkebir Airport**	27°50′21″N 00°11′07″W	AIP Chart	48%
Algiers	Algiers	DAAG	ALG	**Houari Boumediene Airport**	36°41′40″N 03°13′01″E	AIP Chart	62%
Annaba	Annaba	DABB	AAE	**Rabah Bitat Airport**	36°49′20″N 07°48′34″E	AIP Chart	62%
Batna	Batna	DABT	BLJ	**Mostépha Ben Boulaid Airport**	35°45′33″N 06°19′12″E	AIP Chart	
Béjaïa	Béjaïa	DAAE	BJA	**Soummam – Abane Ramdane Airport**	36°42′43″N 05°04′10″E	AIP Chart	93%
Biskra	Biskra	DAUB	BSK	**Mohamed Khider Airport**	34°47′35″N 05°44′17″E	AIP Chart	37%
Chlef	Chlef	DAOI	CFK	**Chlef International Airport** (Aboubakr Belkaid Airport)	36°12′45″N 01°19′54″E	AIP Chart	
Constantine	Constantine	DABC	CZL	**Mohamed Boudiaf International Airport**	36°17′07″N 06°37′09″E	AIP Chart	%
El Oued	El Oued	DAUO	ELU	**Guemar Airport**	33°30′47″N 06°46′57″E	AIP Chart	
Ghardaïa	Ghardaïa	DAUG	GHA	**Noumérat – Moufdi Zakaria Airport**	32°22′54″N 03°47′58″E	AIP Chart	55%
Hassi Messaoud	Ouargla	DAUH	HME	**Oued Irara–Krim Belkacem Airport**	31°40′26″N 06°08′26″E	AIP Chart	54%
In Amenas	Illizi	DAUZ	IAM	**In Amenas Airport** (Zarzaitine Airport)	28°03′05″N 09°38′34″E	AIP Chart	
Jijel	Jijel	DAAV	GJL	**Jijel Ferhat Abbas Airport**	36°47′40″N 05°52′25″E	AIP Chart	48%
Oran	Oran	DAOO	ORN	**Ahmed Ben Bella Airport**	35°37′38″N 00°36′41″W	AIP Chart	57%
Sétif	Sétif	DAAS	QSF	**Ain Arnat Airport** (8 Mai 45 Airport)	36°10′41″N 05°19′28″E	AIP Chart	48%
Tamanrasset	Tamanrasset	DAAT	TMR	**Aguenar – Hadj Bey Akhamok Airport**	22°48′40″N 05°27′03″E	AIP Chart	60%
Tébessa	Tébessa	DABS	TEE	**Cheikh Larbi Tébessa Airport**	35°25′57″N 08°07′32″E	AIP Chart	
Tlemcen	Tlemcen	DAON	TLM	**Zenata – Messali El Hadj Airport**	35°00′55″N 01°27′03″W	AIP Chart	72%
**National airports**							
Béchar	Béchar	DAOR	CBH	**Boudghene Ben Ali Lotfi Airport**	31°39′17″N 02°15′40″W	AIP Chart	
Bordj Badji Mokhtar	Adrar	DATM	BMW	**Bordj Mokhtar Airport**	21°22′30″N 00°55′26″E	AIP Chart	
Bou Saâda	M'Sila	DAAD	BUJ	**Bou Saada Airport**	35°19′53″N 04°12′16″E	AIP Chart	
Djanet	Illizi	DAAJ	DJG	**Tiska Djanet Airport**	24°17′35″N 09°27′07″E	AIP Chart	65%
El Bayadh	El Bayadh	DAOY	EBH	**El Bayadh Airport**	33°43′15″N 01°05′29″E	AIP Chart	
El Goléa	Ghardaïa	DAUE	ELG	**El Golea Airport**	30°34′08″N 02°51′53″E	AIP Chart	
Illizi	Illizi	DAAP	VVZ	**Takhamalt Airport**	26°43′25″N 08°37′04″E	AIP Chart	
In Guezzam	Tamanrasset	DATG	INF	In Guezzam Airport	19°34′08″N 05°44′56″E	AIP Chart	
In Salah	Tamanrasset	DAUI	INZ	**In Salah Airport**	27°15′13″N 02°30′39″E	AIP Chart	
Mascara / Ghriss	Mascara	DAOV	MUW	**Ghriss Airport**	35°13′01″N 00°08′54″E	AIP Chart	
Ouargla	Ouargla	DAUU	OGX	**Ain Beida Airport** (Ain el Beida Airport)	31°55′02″N 05°24′46″E	AIP Chart	
Tiaret	Tiaret	DAOB	TID	**Abdelhafid Boussouf Bou Chekif Airport**	35°20′29″N 01°28′01″E	AIP Chart	
Timimoun	Adrar	DAUT	TMX	**Timimoun Airport**	29°14′28″N 00°17′01″E	AIP Chart	
Tindouf	Tindouf	DAOF	TIN	**Tindouf Airport**	27°42′01″N 08°10′02″W	AIP Chart	
Touggourt	Ouargla	DAUK	TGR	**Sidi Mahdi Airport**	33°04′03″N 06°05′27″E	AIP Chart	
**Military airports**							
Aïn Beïda	Oum El Bouaghi	DABO		Oum el Bouaghi Airport	35°52′39″N 07°15′26″E		
Aïn Oussera	Djelfa	DAAQ		Aïn Oussera Airport	35°31′32″N 02°52′43″E		
Boufarik	Blida	DAAK		Boufarik Airport	36°32′45″N 02°52′34″E		
Bousfer	Oran	DAOE		Bousfer Air Base	35°44′07″N 00°48′19″W		
Mécheria	Naâma	DAAY	MZW	**Mécheria Airport**	33°32′08″N 00°14′32″W		
Oran	Oran	DAOL	TAF	Oran Tafraoui Airport (Tafaraoui Airport)	35°32′33″N 00°31′56″W		
Teleghma	Mila	DAAM		Telerghma Airport	36°06′31″N 06°21′51″E		
**Other airports**							
Âouinet Bel Egrâ	Tindouf			Gara Djebilet Airport	26°53′01″N 07°09′53″W		
Béchar	Béchar	DAOC		Béchar Ouakda Airport	31°38′35″N 02°11′04″W		
Béni Abbès	Béchar			Béni Abbès Airport	30°07′32″N 02°8′14″W		
Blida	Blida	DAAB		Blida Airport	36°30′13″N 02°48′51″E		
Bordj Omar Driss	Illizi	DAAW		Bordj Omar Driss Airport	28°07′55″N 06°49′59″E		
Djelfa	Djelfa	DAFI		Tsletsi Airport	34°39′56″N 03°21′03″E		
Guelma	Guelma			Guelma Belkheir Airport - Closed	36°27′12″N 07°28′07″E		
Hassi R'Mel	Laghouat	DAFH	HRM	**Hassi R'Mel Airport** (Tilrempt Airport)	32°55′49″N 03°18′41″E		
Laghouat	Laghouat	DAUL	LOO	**L'Mekrareg Airport**	33°45′50″N 02°55′38″E		
M'Sila	M'Sila			M'Sila Airport - Closed	35°42′35″N 04°27′30″E		
Mostaganem	Mostaganem		MQV	Mostaganem Airport	35°54′32″N 00°08′56″E		
Reggane	Adrar	DAAN		Reggane Airport	26°42′36″N 00°17′08″E		
Relizane	Relizane	DAAZ		Relizane Airport	35°45′08″N 00°37′35″E		
Saïda	Saïda			Saïda Airport	34°53′50″N 00°09′06″E		
Sidi Bel Abbès	Sidi Bel Abbès	DAOS	BFW	Sidi Bel Abbès Airport	35°10′19″N 00°35′35″W		
Skikda	Skikda	DABP	SKI	Skikda Airport - Closed	36°51′43″N 06°56′58″E		

== Usage statistics ==
This table shows the passengers and freight of airports in Algeria in 2008.

Airport	IATA/ICAO	City served	Province	Total passengers	Domestic passengers	International passengers	Total freight	Domestic freight	International freight	Total movements
Soummam – Abane Ramdane Airport	BJA/DAAE	Béjaïa	Béjaïa	205,312	51,757	153,555	71,057	30,537	40,520	2463
Houari Boumediene Airport	ALG/DAAG	Algiers	Algiers	###	###	###	###	###	###	###
Chlef International Airport	CSK/DAOI	Chlef	Chlef	25,122	0	25,122	0	0	0	212
L'Mekrareg Airport	LOO/DAUL	Laghouat	Laghouat	2,601	11	2,590	0	0	0	43
Guemar Airport	ELU/DAUO	El Oued	El Oued	22,098	19,715	2,383	0	0	0	680
Sidi Mahdi Airport	TGR/DAUK	Touggourt	Ouargla	10,884	10,884	0	0	0	0	426
Hassi R'Mel Airport	HRM/DAFH	Hassi R'Mel	Laghouat	25,147	25,147	0	10.09	10.09	0	452
Noumérat - Moufdi Zakaria Airport	GHA/DAUG	Ghardaïa	Ghardaïa	45,022	34,500	10,522	107,886	7,186	100,700	1595
Ain Beida Airport	OGX/DAUU	Ouargla	Ouargla	37,675	35,075	2,600	40.11	40.11	0	970
Oued Irara-Krim Belkacem Airport	HME/DAUH	Hassi Messaoud	Ouargla	565,656	518,241	47,415	3084.434	217.472	2866.962	6274

== See also ==
- Transport in Algeria
- Algerian Air Force
- List of airports by ICAO code: D#DA - Algeria
- Wikipedia: WikiProject Aviation/Airline destination lists: Africa#Algeria
