= Algerian Air Force =

Air warfare branch of Algeria's military

- القُوَّاتُ الجَوِّيَّةُ الجَزَائِرِيَّةُ (Arabic); ⵜⵔⴻⴷⵙⴰ ⵜⴰⴷⵣⴰⵢⵔⵉⵜ ⵏ ⵢⵉⴳⴻⵏⵏⵉ (Berber languages); Forces aériennes algériennes (French)
- Badge of the Algerian Air Force
- Founded: 1958; 68 years ago
- Country: Algeria
- Type: Air force
- Role: Aerial warfare
- Size: 14,000; 637 aircraft
- Part of: Algerian People's National Army
- Website: www.mdn.dz/site_cfa/accueil_an.php

Commanders
- Current commander: Major General Zoubir Ghouila

Insignia
- Roundel

Aircraft flown
- Attack: Su-24MK2
- Fighter: MiG-29 9.13/MiG-29M 9.41/MiG-29M2, Su-30MKA, Su-35, Su-57, Su-34
- Helicopter: AW101, AW119, AW139, Kamov Ka-27, Bell 412, Mi-24, Mi-26, Mi-28, Mi-17
- Trainer: Z 142, T-34C, L-39, Yak-130
- Transport: C-130, Il-76, C-295
- Tanker: IL-78

The Algerian Air Force (Arabic: القُوَّاتُ الجَوِّيَّةُ الجَزَائِرِيَّةُ, French: Forces aériennes algériennes) is the aerial arm of the Algerian People's National Army.

Its history begins with the creation by Saïd Aït Messaoudène, during the war of independence, of a first nucleus of air force with the training of Algerian pilots and personnel from friendly countries. This nucleus officially gave birth in 1962, the day after independence, to the Algerian Air Force.

Major General Mahmoud Laraba was appointed Commander of the Air Force in July 2020, succeeding Major General Hamid Boumaïza. On February 23, 2025, Major General Zoubir Ghouila took office as Commander of the Air Force, replacing Mahmoud Laraba.

== History ==
The Algerian Air Force was created to support the fight of the People's National Army against the French occupying forces. It came as part of the decisions of the Soummam congress held on August 20, 1956, which recommended a long-term plan to form a modern army.

=== Before 1962 ===
In 1957, six Algerians were sent for training to the Syrian Arab Air Force flight school at Nayrab near Aleppo. During this period, training also took place with the Egyptian and Iraqi air forces, as well as in the USSR and in China. During this period, the French army started the Challe and Morice lines used to isolate the ALN fighters inside the country and to stop supplies coming from Tunisia and Morocco. Then came the idea to train transport and helicopter pilots to ensure supplying the national liberation army, and to prepare the first core of the military aviation. The Algerian Air Force was officially established on 4 February 1959, as a part of the FLN.

=== From 1962 to 1970 ===
The Algerian Air Force was originally based at Maison Blanche (White House). In 1962, Egypt transferred 12 Helwan Gomhouria trainers and five MiG-15s (two MiG-15UTIs and three MiG-15bis), together with a group of advisors to help with training. Several Mil Mi-4s were also received from the Soviet Union. Two Beech D.185S light transports purchased for the personal use of then President Ben Bella in 1963.

Training was one of the major preoccupations of the ALN/FLN leaders. Military aviation had a core of pilots and technicians after independence, who laid the foundations of the present Air Force. The Algerian authorities sent trainees to friendly countries such Egypt, Syria, Iraq, China, and the USSR, while waiting for the creation of Algerian Air Force schools. In 1966, the Air Base of Tafraoui in the 2nd Military Region was built as an air officers' school (EOA) where the first officer students were received to train as pilots and technicians in aeronautics.

The nascent Algerian Air Force participated in the 1963 Sand War with Morocco. However, air power did not play a big role during the war. MiG-15s and Mi-4s were used, and aircraft from national company Air Algérie served for transport duties. Following the end of the war, the build-up of the Algerian Air Force was intensified. In 1964, 20 additional MiG-15bis fighters were delivered by the USSR. The next year, the first of at least 30 MiG-17s arrived in Algeria. In 1965–1966, 24 MiG-21F-13s were received, and 14 Ilyushin Il-28s were ordered in the same period, as well as some MiG-21FLs. Despite its growth, at the time of the Six-Day War the Algerian Air Force was not deemed combat ready. Still, 20 MiG-17Fs, 20 MiG-21s and 12 Il-28s were sent to Egypt, but without any crews. In 1967, the Algerian Air Force also bought its first surface-to-air missile systems, with two battalions of S-75 Dvinas. However, these were never put into service.

=== From 1970 to 1980 ===
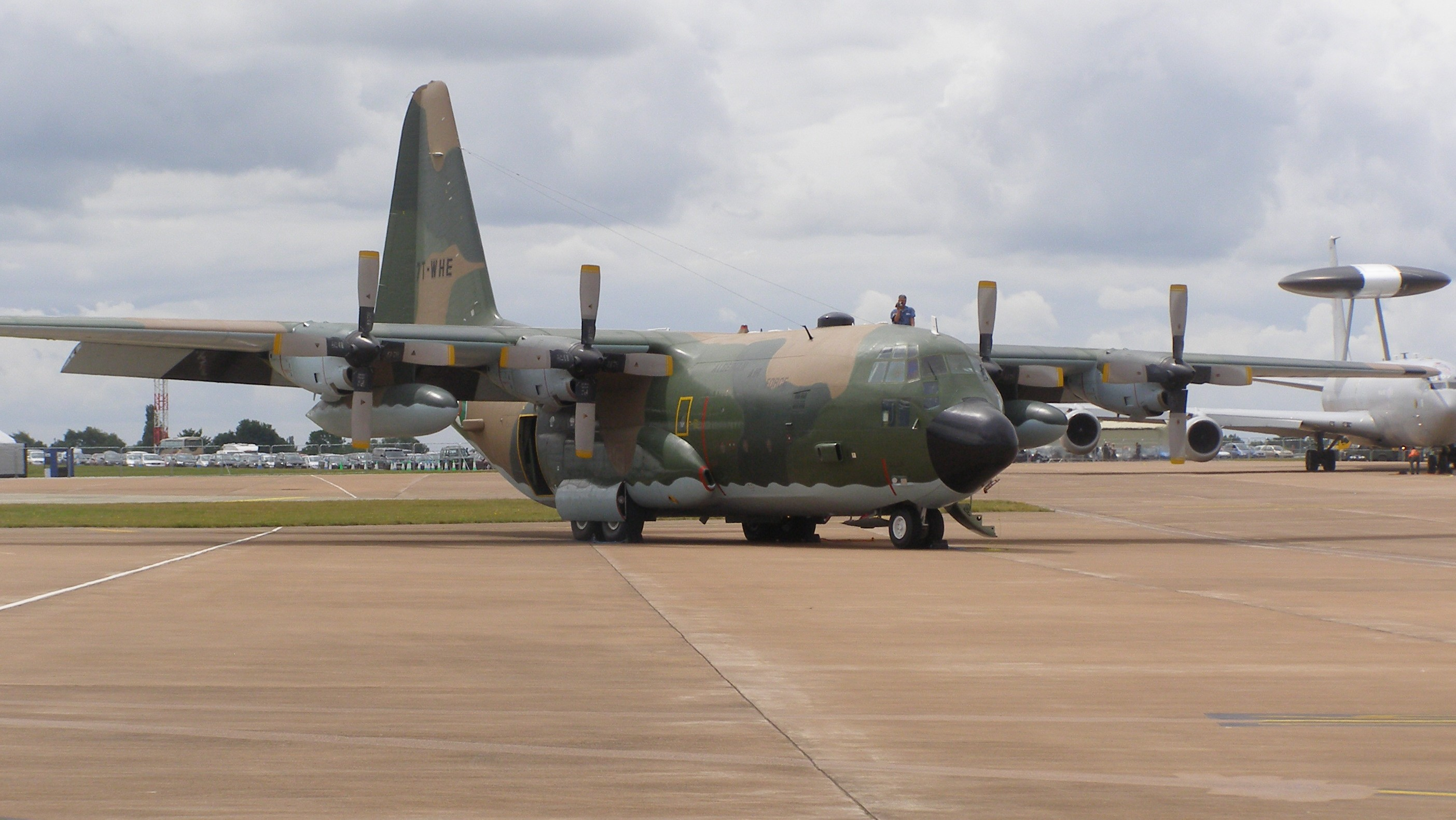
C-130H Hercules

In the late 1960s, thanks to increased oil prices and to Algeria's economic growth, important arms orders were passed with the USSR. Hence, in the early 1970s, the Algerian Air Force received 52 MiG-21MFs, MiG-21Rs and MiG-21UMs, and 40 Sukhoi Su-7BMKs. During the same period, 28 second-hand Fouga CM.170 Magisters were bought from West Germany, as well as some Aérospatiale SA 330 Puma and Mil Mi-6 helicopters.

Thanks to its growth in the previous years, the Algerian Air Force was able to participate directly in the 1973 October War. Two squadrons of MiG-21s, another of Su-7s and a unit comprising 23 MiG-17s were sent to Egypt. This deployment was supported by Antonov An-12 transports. Some Algerian pilots were also assigned to Egyptian Air Force MiG-17 squadrons. In total, around 500 combat sorties were flown by Algerian pilots. One MiG-21 and one Su-7 were shot down, but no pilot was killed or captured.

In 1975, another big arms deal was passed with Moscow, including 40 MiG-23BNs, 47 MiG-21bis, and 16 Mil Mi-8s. The first MiG-23BNs arrived in 1976; this type replaced the Su-7BMKs. Another arms order followed in 1978, with the Algerians requesting the delivery of 40 more MiG-21s, 16 MiG-23MFs, 20 Mil Mi-24s, and 12 S-125 Pechora missile systems. However, while 20 MiG-25s were delivered by 1979, negotiations for the remainder of the package proved much more difficult than expected, and took nearly four years. Limited quantities of Western aircraft were bought too: in 1978, six T-34C Mentors and three Fokker F27s were acquired.

=== From 1980 to 2000 ===
In 1981, thanks to the deliveries of air defence equipment, a new branch of the air force was created: the Défense Aérienne du Territoire (Territorial Air Defence). Through the 1980s, the Algerian Air Force worked to build a fully integrated network of early warning radars. In 1986–1988, the Territorial Air Defence was expanded and reorganised into the Commandement de la Défense Aérienne du Territoire (Territorial Air Defence Command). In 1988, this command became a fully independent branch of the Algerian armed forces.

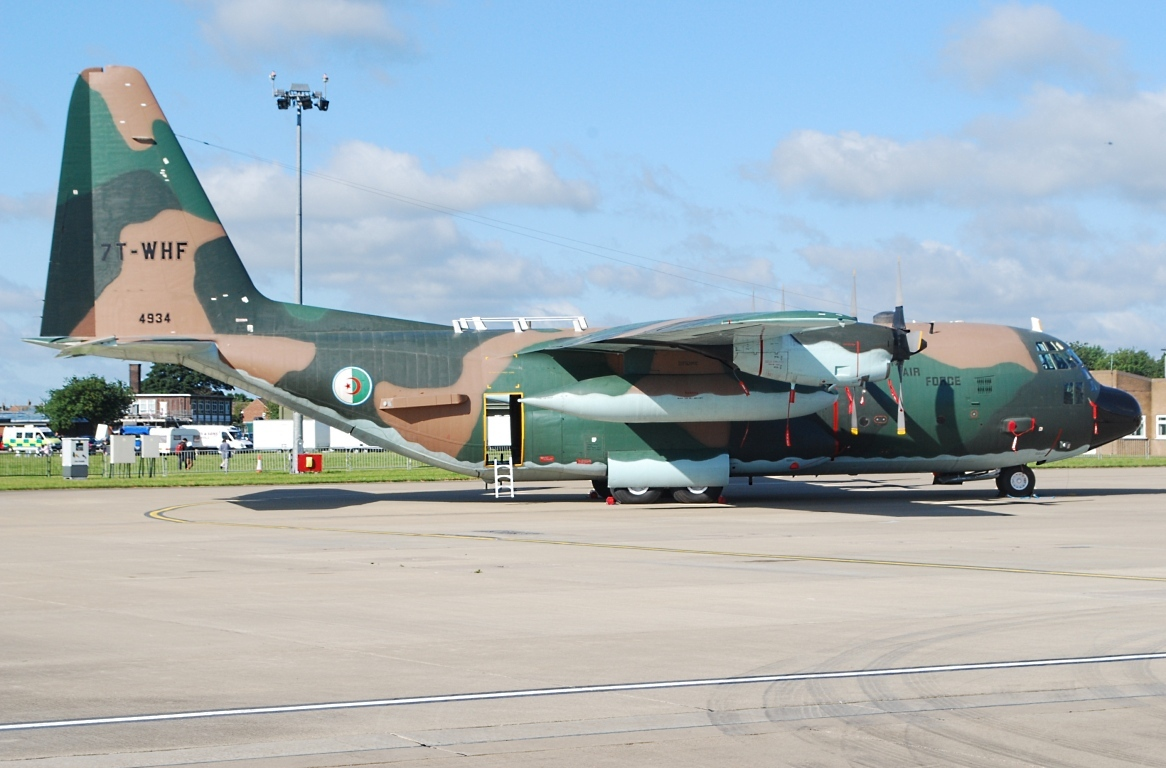
Algerian C-130H on the airport apron An Ilyushin IL-78

The resulting organisational structure of the air force was as follows:

- A central command assisted by a general staff and an inspectorate, an arms division, a department of support, and specialized offices
- Air commands in the military regions
- Air bases, schools, training centers, support institutions, equipment renovation enterprises & defense, and control units

In the second half of the 1980s, the Algerian Air Force also introduced the wing structure. During this period few changes occurred in the combat aircraft inventory of the Algerian Air Force. Ten Sukhoi Su-24MKs were received from the USSR, while the ageing MiG-17F was phased out. A new airplane supplier emerged just after the Iranian revolution when Algeria received 18 C-130H Hercules and 12 Hawker Beechcrafts supplied by USA from 1981 to 1989.

Starting in the second half of the 1980s, the Algerian Air Force saw combat in the Algerian Civil War.

=== From 2000 to 2020 ===
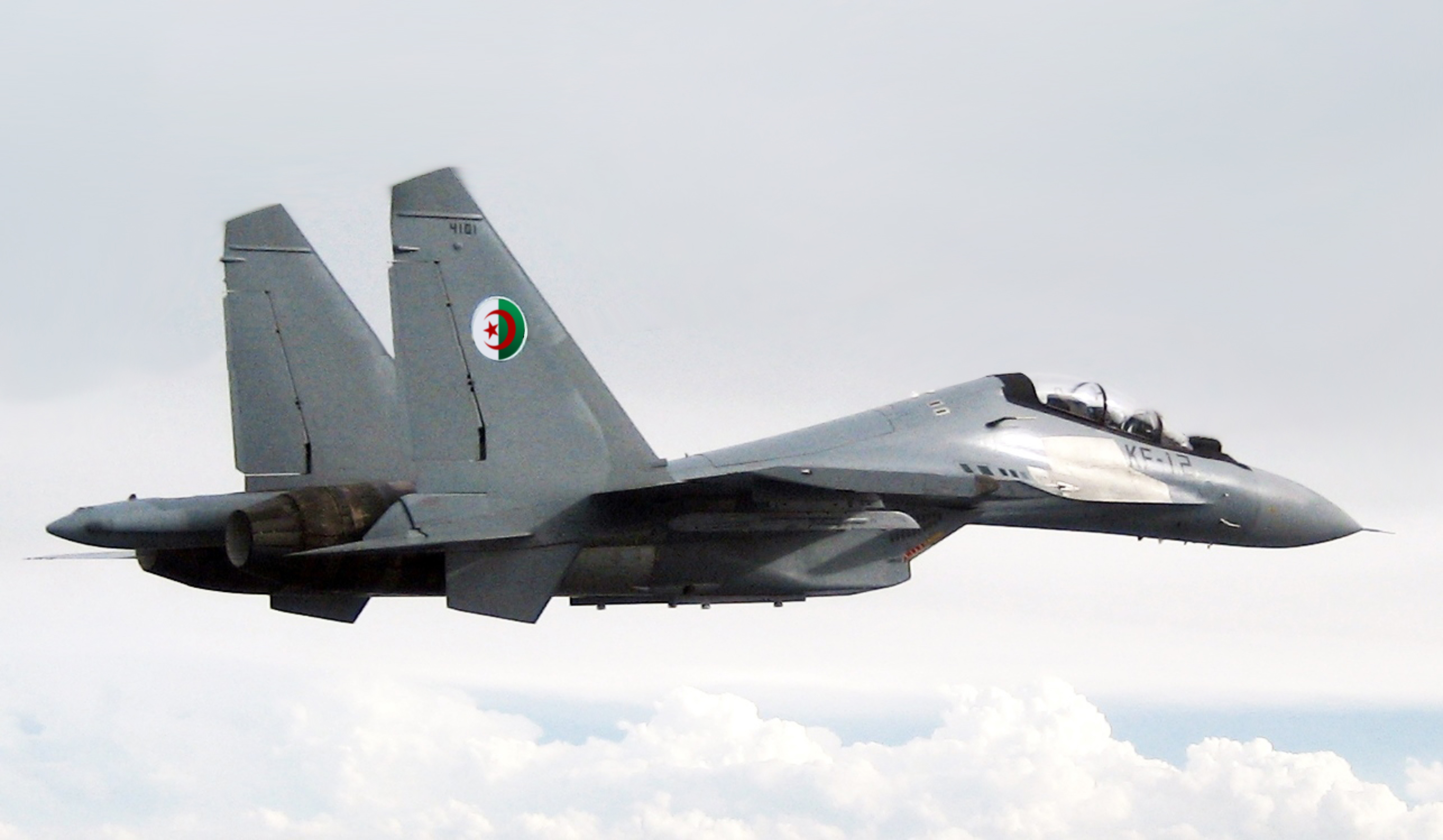
An Algerian Su-30MKA

As the Civil War was winding down, the Algerian Air Force began to replace its older combat aircraft. The last MiG-21s were withdrawn from service in 2002. The MiG-23BNs followed in 2005, as did the MiG-23MFs in 2008. The Air Force purchased a large number of Mikoyan MiG-29s (index 9.13) from Belarus and Ukraine from 1999 to 2003. At least 25 Su-24MKs were also acquired during the same period. In March 2006, as part of a bigger arms deal, Algeria ordered 28 Sukhoi Su-30MKA multirole fighters, 16 Yakovlev Yak-130 trainers, 28 MiG-29SMTs fighters and six MiG-29UB conversion trainers from Russia. Shortly after the first MiG-29 9.19 deliveries, the Algerian military discovered that these aircraft were not newly built airframes, but older ones modernised to MiG-29 9.19 standard. The decision was taken to send back the aircraft to Russia, refuse all of the planned subsequent deliveries, and to freeze the payments for these aircraft. After a meeting between Algerian and Russian heads of state in February 2008, the aircraft that had already been delivered were returned to Russia, and the whole batch originally built for Algeria was bought back and delivered to the Russian Air Force. Instead, Algeria was given the possibility to order another batch of Su-30MKAs at sharply reduced prices. This was done in December 2010, when 16 additional aircraft were ordered. In December 2015, 32 more Su-30MKAs were purchased. Algeria ordered 32 SU-30MKA and 4 MIG-29M/M2 multirole fighters in 2019, a massive 10.4-billion-dollar deal.

=== Since 2020 ===
In late 2020 Algerian Air Force modernized its SU-24M/MK/MR to the M2/MR2 format.

In August 2022, the final MIG-25 were retired, but in late 2022 they were brought back to service.

Since 2025, the Algerian Air Force has entered a new phase of modernization. In 2025, a deal was signed with Russia for the delivery of Sukhoi Su-35 multirole fighters, continuing the long-standing partnership between the two countries. The delivery of these aircraft started in March 2025.

In addition to fighter jets, Algeria has also improved its helicopter fleet. In 2022, the Air Force received several AW139 utility helicopters from the Italian company Leonardo. These helicopters are used for search and rescue missions, transport, and other support roles.

== Air bases ==
- Oum El Bouaghi (DABO)35°52′22″N 007°15′48″E
- Annaba (DABB) 36°49′11″N 007°48′42″E
- Ain Oussera (DAAQ) 35°31′16″N 002°52′59″E
- Biskra (DAUB) 34°48′21″N 005°44′23″E
- Bou Sfer (DAOE) 35°43′53″N 000°48′15″W
- Boufarik (DAAK) 36°33′10″N 002°52′33″E
- Boudghene Ben Ali Lotfi (DAOR) 31°39′05″N 002°15′40″E
- Chlef (DAOI) 36°12′38″N 001°19′46″E
- El Boulaida/Blida (DAAB) 36°29′52″N 002°48′36″E
- Laghouat (DAUL) 33°46′07″N 002°55′18″E
- Tamanrasset/Aguenar (DAAT) 22°48′40″N 05°27′03″E

See also List of airports in Algeria for other airfields which may have a dual civil-military function.

The air force has two Air Commando Rifle Regiments, primarily base defence troops but have reportedly taken part in anti-terrorism operations. They are the 772nd and 782nd Regiment des Fusiliers Commandos de l'air (RFCA).

== Aircraft ==
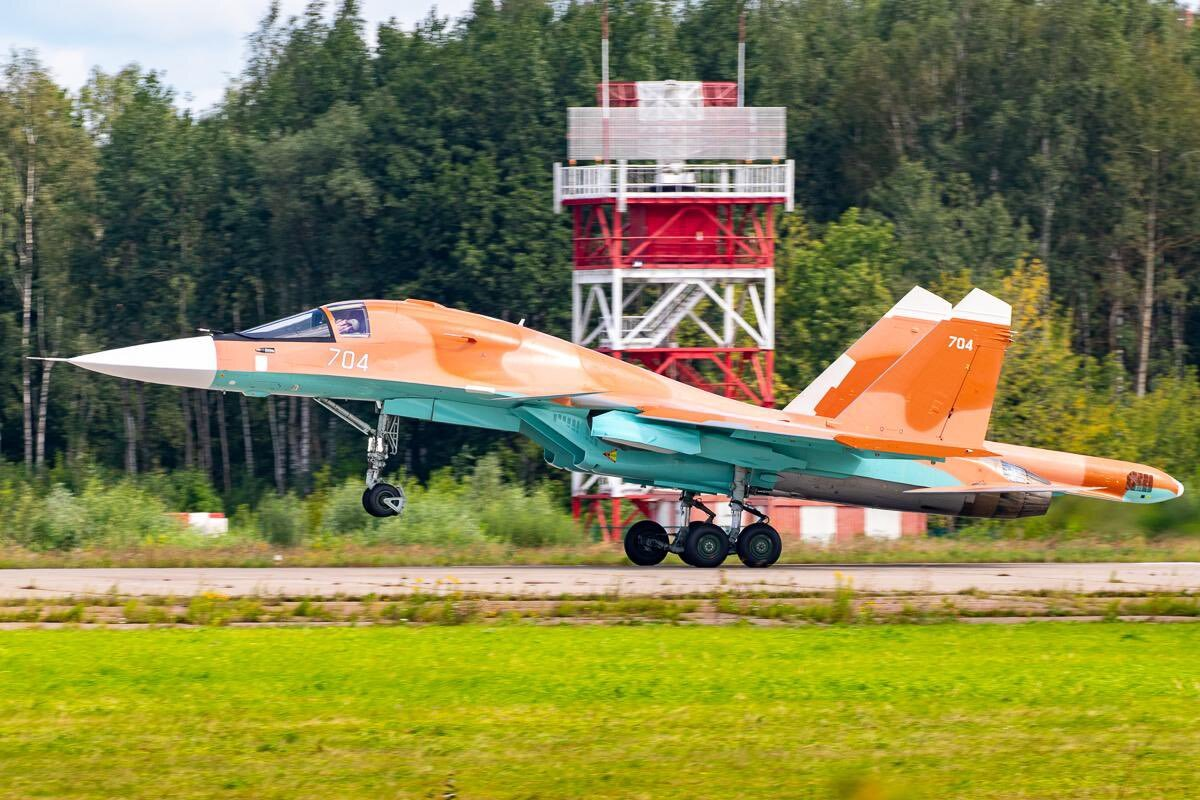
Algerian Su-34

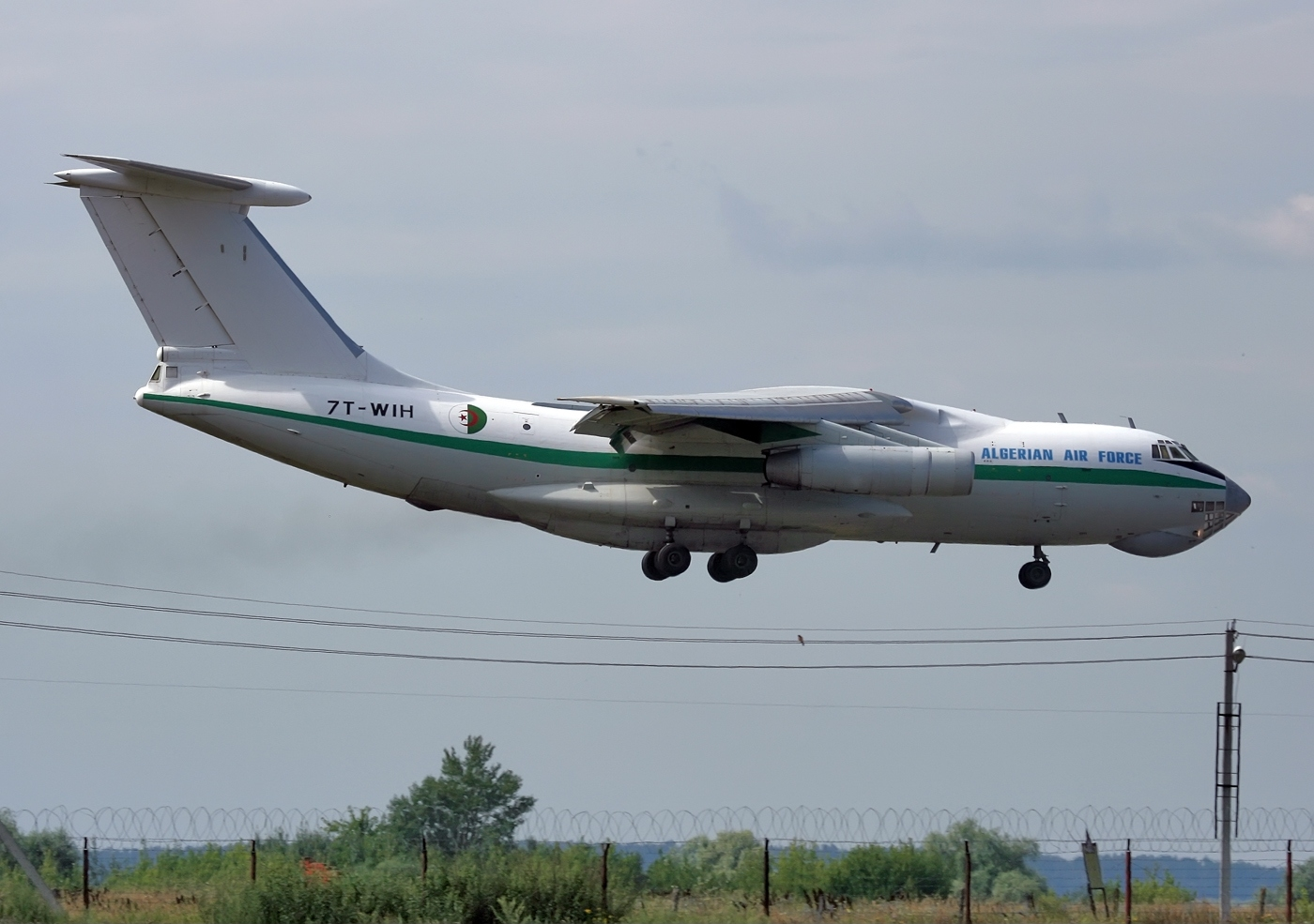
Algerian Il-78

=== Current inventory ===
==== Aeroplanes ====
Aircraft	Origin	Role	Variant	In service	Squadron	Notes
Combat aircraft
Mikoyan MiG-29	Belarus / Ukraine / Russia	Multirole fighter	MiG 29C (9.13)	46	Fighter squadrons (113, 153, 193)	21 MiG 29C
Mikoyan MiG-29	Belarus / Ukraine / Russia	Multirole fighter	MiG-29M (9.41)	46	Fighter squadrons (113, 153, 193)	25 MiG-29M and M2.
Mikoyan MiG-29	Belarus / Ukraine / Russia	Multirole fighter	MiG-29M2 (9.47)	46	Fighter squadrons (113, 153, 193)	25 MiG-29M and M2.
Sukhoi Su-24	Soviet Union	Tactical bomber	Su-24 MK2	39	Attack aircraft squadrons (274, 284, 294)	Modernised to MK2 format in 2020.
Sukhoi Su-24	Soviet Union	Reconnaissance	SU-24 MRK2	3	Reconnaissance and electronic warfare squadron (525)	Modernised to MRK2 format in 2020
Sukhoi Su-30	Russia	Multirole fighter	Su-30MKA	72	Air defence squadrons (121, 122, 123)	31 were delivered, 1 of which was lost in a crash in 2018.
Sukhoi Su-34	Russia	Fighter-bomber	Su-34E Su-34M	14 N/A	N/A	A leak from Rostec confirms an order of 14 Su-34. Satellite imagery confirmed Algeria received a batch of Su-34M.
Sukhoi Su-35	Russia	Swing-role fighter	–	9 (+ 6 on order)	Air defence squadron (121)	Satellite data show that 25 Su-35 were produced, nine are no longer visible on current satellite images. Two Su-35 were spotted in Algeria, and six Su-35 ordered were observed on Russian soil with the Algerian roundels.
J-10	China	Multirole fighter	J-10C	+40 on order	N/A	Algeria is finalizing deal to acquire 40 of this aircraft, deliveries beginning in 2027.
Sukhoi Su-57	Russia	Swing-role stealth fighter	Su-57E	2 (+ 4 on order)	N/A	A leak from Rostec confirms an order of 4 Su-57 and on ground footage in Algeria prove their delivery.
Special mission aircraft
Beechcraft 1900	United States	Reconnaissance	B1900D	5	Electronic warfare squadrons (525, 550)	Fitted with HISAR, Sky Guardian ESM and Wescam Type 16 FLIR. 1 lost in 2026.
Beechcraft Super King Air	United States	Maritime patrol / EW	B200T	2	Electronic warfare squadrons (525, 550)	
Beechcraft Super King Air	United States	Maritime patrol / EW	B350ER	1	Electronic warfare squadrons (525, 550)	
Beriev Be-200	Russia	Amphibian, aerial firefighting	Be-200ES	2 (+ 2 on order)	Multirole tactical air transport squadron (595)	Four ordered in 2021.
KJ-500	China	AEW&C	KJ-500	+5 on order	N/A	Algeria is finalizing deal to acquire 4-5 units of this aircraft, deliveries beginning in 2027.
Aerial refueling
Ilyushin Il-76	Soviet Union	Tanker / tactical & strategic transport aircraft	Il-78	4	Air refueling squadron (367)	6 aircraft were purchased from Ukraine, 4 remain in service as of 2026.
Military transport
Ilyushin Il-76	Soviet Union	Tactical & strategic transport aircraft	Il-76TD	8	Air transport squadron (347, 367)	12 were acquired from Russia, some were upgraded. In 2018, one Il-76TD crashed.
Ilyushin Il-76	Soviet Union	Tactical & strategic transport aircraft	Il-76MD	3	Air transport squadron (347, 367)	12 were acquired from Russia, some were upgraded. In 2018, one Il-76TD crashed.
Lockheed C-130 Hercules	United States	Tactical transport aircraft	C-130H	4	Tactical transport and logistics squadron (2)	
Lockheed C-130 Hercules	United States	Tactical transport aircraft	C-130H-30	7	Tactical transport and logistics squadron (2)	
Lockheed L-100 Hercules	United States	Civilian transport aircraft	L-100-30	1	Tactical transport and logistics squadron (2)	
Lockheed-Martin C-130J Super Hercules	United States	Tactical transport aircraft	C-130J-30	4	Tactical transport and logistics squadron (2)	4 C-130J-30 ordered in 2018 with an option for four additional aircraft.
CASA C295	Spain	Tactical transport aircraft	C295M	5	N/A	6 aircraft purchased in the transport configuration One aircraft was lost in 2012 in a crash in France.
Pilatus PC-6 Porter	Switzerland	Utility aircraft	–	3	N/A	
VIP transport
Airbus A340	France / Germany / Spain / United Kingdom	VIP transport	A340-500	1	N/A	Fitted with a medical unit, sleeping chamber with an en-suite bathroom, offices and anti-missile systems.
Gulfstream IV	United States	VIP transport / liaison aircraft	GIV-SP	4	High personnel transport squadron (580)	
Gulfstream V	United States	VIP transport / liaison aircraft	GV	1	High personnel transport squadron (580)	
Beechcraft 1900	United States	VIP transport / liaison aircraft	B1900D	6	N/A	
Beechcraft Super King Air	United States	VIP transport / liaison aircraft	C90B	20	N/A	
Beechcraft Super King Air	United States	VIP transport / liaison aircraft	B200T	20	N/A	
Beechcraft Super King Air	United States	VIP transport / liaison aircraft	B350ER	20	N/A	
Trainer aircraft
Zlin Z 142	Czech Republic / Algeria	Ab initio trainer	Firnas 142	20	N/A	
Aero L-39 Albatros	Czech Republic	Advanced trainer	L-39C	54	N/A	
Aero L-39 Albatros	Czech Republic	Advanced trainer / light attack aircraft	L-39ZA	54	N/A	
Yakovlev Yak-130	Russia	Lead-in fighter trainer	–	18	N/A	
Mikoyan MiG-29	Russia	Conversion training	–	2	Fighter squadrons (113)	

==== Helicopters ====
Aircraft	Origin	Role	Variant	In service	Notes
Attack helicopters
Mil Mi-24	Russia / South Africa	Attack helicopter	Mi-24 Super Hind Mk.III	32	
Mil Mi-28	Russia	Attack helicopter	Mi-28NE Night Hunter	42	8 helicopters ordered initially, increased to 42 in 2016.
Mil Mi-28	Russia	Attack helicopter trainer	Mi-28UB	42	8 helicopters ordered initially, increased to 42 in 2016.
Multirole helicopters
Mil Mi-8	Soviet Union / Russia	Attack / transport / CSAR / SAR / Medevac	Mil Mi-8AMTSh	104	The Mil Mi-8 were upgraded as part of a 2014 contract.
Mil Mi-17	Soviet Union / Russia	Attack / transport / CSAR / SAR / Medevac	–	104	The Mil Mi-8 were upgraded as part of a 2014 contract.
Mil Mi-17	Russia	Attack / transport / CSAR / SAR / Medevac	Mil Mi-171Sh2	37	42 Mil Mi-171 were received between 2002 and 2004, 3 of which were lost prior to be modernised. In 2014–2016, Algeria decided to modernise 39 helicopters. In 2023, one additional helicopter was lost, and another one in 2024.
Transport helicopters
Mil Mi-26	Russia	Heavy transport helicopter	Mi-26T2	14	Six delivered in 2015-16 and eight ordered from the option on the first order, with deliveries taking place in 2017–18.
Utility helicopters
AgustaWestland AW139	Italy / United Kingdom	CSAR	–	11	
Bell 412	United States	Utility helicopter	Bell 412EP	3	They were delivered in 2002.
Eurocopter AS355 Écureuil	France	Light utility helicopter	AS355N Écureuil 2	14	
Kamov Ka-32	Russia	SAR	Ka-32T	3	
Mil Mi-2	Soviet Union / Poland	Liaison helicopter	–	22	
VIP transport helicopters
AgustaWestland EH101 Merlin	Italy / United Kingdom	VIP transport / liaison helicopter	AW101 Model 642	2	
Training helicopters
AgustaWestland AW119	Italy	Training helicopter	AW119Ke Koala	8	
PZL W-3 Sokół	Poland	Training helicopter	W-3A	8	

==== Drones ====
Aircraft	Origin	Role	Variant	In service	Notes
Combat drones
CASIC WJ-700 Falcon	China	HALE, reconnaissance, UCAV; High-altitude long-endurance, unmanned combat aerial vehicle	–	4	Drone acquired in 2024.
CAIG Wing Loong II	China	MALE, reconnaissance, UCAV; Medium-altitude long-endurance, unmanned combat aerial vehicle	–	24	
Yabhon Flash 20	United Arab Emirates; Algeria (licence production)	MALE, reconnaissance, UCAV; Medium-altitude long-endurance, unmanned combat aerial vehicle	El-Djazair-55	–	It can be armed with Nimrod ATGM or 120 mm mortar rounds.
Yabhon United 40	United Arab Emirates / Algeria (licence production)	MALE, reconnaissance, UCAV; Medium-altitude long-endurance, unmanned combat aerial vehicle	El-Djazaïr 54 (United 40 Block 5)	–	It can be armed with Nimrod ATGM or 120 mm mortar rounds.
TAI Aksungur	Turkey	MALE, reconnaissance, UCAV; Medium-altitude long-endurance, unmanned combat aerial vehicle	–	0 (+ 6 on order)	These were ordered in 2022.
TAI Anka	Turkey	MALE, reconnaissance, UCAV; Medium-altitude long-endurance, unmanned combat aerial vehicle	Anka-S	0 (+ 10 on order)	
ISR drones
Denel Seeker	South Africa	ISTAR, UAV; Intelligence, surveillance, target acquisition, and reconnaissance, unmanned aerial vehicle	–	10	
CASC Rainbow	China	ISTAR, UAV; Intelligence, surveillance, target acquisition, and reconnaissance, unmanned aerial vehicle	CH-3	5	Drones purchased in 2018.
CASC Rainbow	China	ISTAR, UAV; Intelligence, surveillance, target acquisition, and reconnaissance, unmanned aerial vehicle	CH-4	5	Drones purchased in 2018.
Aisheng ASN-209	China	ISTAR, UAV; Intelligence, surveillance, target acquisition, and reconnaissance, unmanned aerial vehicle	–		

== Incidents ==
- In November 2012, a C-295M cargo plane returning from Paris crashed in southeastern France, killing all six people on board.
- In December 2012, two MiG-29s conducting routine training operations collided in midair in northwestern Algeria, killing both pilots.
- On 11 February 2014, a C-130H-30 Hercules transport plane crashed in Oum El Bouaghi, Algeria. It resulted in 77 deaths.
- On 11 October 2014, a Sukhoi Su-24 crashed in a military zone during training, killing its two occupants.
- On 11 November 2014, a MiG-25 or MiG-29 fighter came down near a military range in the Hassi Bahbah Military Region in the central part of Algeria. No casualties were reported at the time as the pilot was alone and ejected safely out of the plane.
- On 20 April 2015, a Mil Mi-24 helicopter crashed a few minutes after taking off from Illizi Airport, killing both crew members.
- On 27 March 2016, a Mi-171 helicopter crashed near Reggane due to technical problems, killing 12 soldiers and leaving two others injured.
- On 11 April 2018, an Il-76 strategic airlifter crashed in a field shortly after taking off from Boufarik Airport. It resulted in 257 deaths.
- In February 2019, a Sukhoi Su-24 crashed in the province of Tiaret, resulting in 2 deaths.
- On 13 March 2019, a L-39 crashed at Tafraoui, resulting in 2 deaths.
- On 28 January 2018, a Sukhoi Su-30MKA fighter jet crashed in the mountains resulting in 2 deaths.
- On 25 June 2020, a CH-4 medium-altitude long-endurance UAV crashed due to some unknown issues.
- On 29 March 2022, a MiG-29UB crashed near the city of Oran, due to a technical malfunction, resulting in 1 death.
- On 23 January 2023, a Mi-171 helicopter crashed near El Attaf. All three of its crew died.
- On February 7, 2024, a Mi-171 helicopter crashed near El Menia Airport during a night training flight. All three of its crew died.
- On 19 March 2025, a Sukhoi Su-30MKA fighter jet crashed near Timokten, Adrar after takeoff from Reggane Air Base, resulting in 1 pilot fatality.
- On 5 March 2026, a Beechcraft 1900D operated by the Algerian Air Force crashed shortly after takeoff from Boufarik Airport, near Blida, Algeria. Out of six people on board, four people were killed. An investigation into the cause of the crash was launched by Algerian authorities.

== Ranks ==
=== Commissioned officer ranks ===
The rank insignia of commissioned officers.

Rank group	General / flag officers				Senior officers			Junior officers
Algerian Air Force
Algerian Air Force	فريق أول; Fariq 'awal	فريق; Fariq	لواء; Liwa	عميد; Amid	عقيد; Aqid	مقدم; Muqaddam	رائد; Ra'id	نقيب; Naqib	ملازم أول; Mulazim awwal	ملازم; Mulazim
Algerian Air Force	Général d'armée	Général de corps d'armée	Général major	Général	Colonel	Lieutenant-colonel	Commandant	Capitaine	Lieutenant	Sous-lieutenant

=== Other ranks ===
The rank insignia of non-commissioned officers and enlisted personnel.

Rank group	Senior NCOs				Junior NCOs		Enlisted
Algerian Air Force							No insignia
Algerian Air Force	مساعد أول; Mosa'id awwal	مساعد; Mosa'id	رقيب أول; Raqib awwal	رقيب; Raqib	عريف أول; Earif 'awal	عريف; Earif	جندي; Jundiun
Algerian Air Force	Adjudant chef	Adjudant	Sergent chef	Sergent	Caporal chef	Caporal	Djoundi
