= 2018 Algerian Air Force Ilyushin Il-76 crash =

2018 aviation accident in Boufarik, Algeria

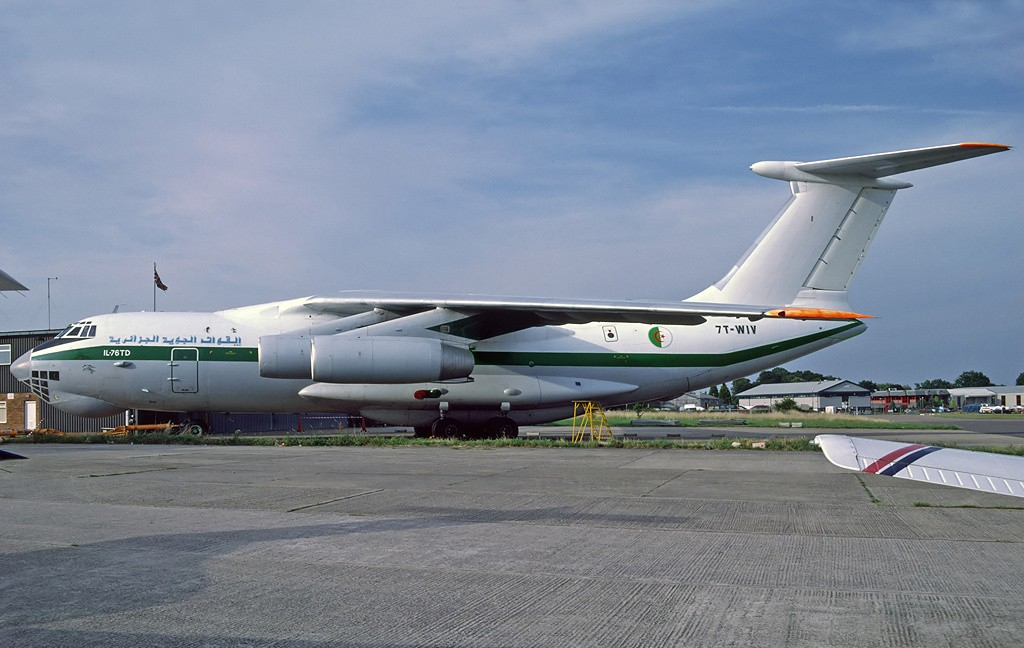
- 7T-WIV, the aircraft involved in the accident, captured in 1999

Accident
- Date: 11 April 2018
- Summary: Crashed shortly after take-off
- Site: Near Boufarik Airport, Boufarik, Algeria; 36°32′22.99″N 02°51′49.68″E

Aircraft
- Aircraft type: Ilyushin Il-76TD
- Operator: Algerian Air Force
- Registration: 7T-WIV
- Flight origin: Boufarik Airport, Boufarik, Algeria
- Stopover: Boudghene Ben Ali Lotfi Airport, Béchar, Algeria
- Destination: Tindouf Airport, Tindouf, Algeria
- Occupants: 257
- Passengers: 247
- Crew: 10
- Fatalities: 257
- Survivors: 0

On 11 April 2018, an Ilyushin Il-76 military transport aircraft of the Algerian Air Force crashed shortly after take-off from Boufarik Airport, Boufarik, Algeria, which is near Blida and south-west of the capital, Algiers. All 257 people on board were killed, making the accident the deadliest aviation disaster in Algerian and African history, and the second-deadliest involving an Il-76 behind the 2003 Iran Ilyushin Il-76 crash.

== Aircraft ==
The aircraft was an Ilyushin Il-76TD of the Algerian Air Force's 347th Strategic Transport Squadron (French: 347e Escadron de Transport Stratégique) produced by Tashkent Aviation Production Association. The aircraft, registered 7T-WIV, msn 1043419649, had first flown in 1994.

== Passengers and crew ==
Nationality	Passengers	Crew	Total
Algeria	165	10	175
France	52	—	52
Sahrawi Arab Democratic Republic	30	—	30
Total	247	10	257

== Crash ==
At 07:50 local time (06:50 UTC), the aircraft crashed just outside the perimeter of Boufarik Airport, Boufarik, from which it had recently taken off. Witnesses reported that the wing of the aircraft had caught fire prior to the crash. The flight had a final destination of Tindouf Airport, Tindouf, with a stopover in Boudghene Ben Ali Lotfi Airport, Béchar. All 10 crew and 247 passengers on board were killed. Though it’s possible some people survived for longer before dying. Among the passengers were 176 members of the Algerian People's National Army. Many of these soldiers and officers were traveling with family members. 52 French-Algerians dual nationals were also on board.

Thirty Saharawi students and other civilians from the refugee camps in Tindouf were among the dead according to officials of the Saharawi Republic. They had been visiting Algiers for various medical and bureaucratic reasons. Saharawis from the refugee camps are regularly provided with free flights in Algerian military transport aircraft. Initial reports claimed that a senior member of the National Liberation Front, the governing party of the National Assembly in Algeria, said that 26 Polisario Front members were among the casualties. EFE write that there were only 30 Saharawi civilian casualties.

Local authorities dispatched 14 ambulances, 10 fire apparata, and 130 personnel to attend to the crash site. As a result of the crash, the road between Boufarik and Blida was temporarily closed to traffic.

== Aftermath ==
Following the accident, Abdelaziz Bouteflika, the President of Algeria, declared three days of national mourning, echoing his reaction to the 2014 military air crash. For his part, Brahim Ghali, the President of the Saharawi Arab Democratic Republic, declared seven days of national mourning. Ahmed Gaid Salah, Chief of Staff of the Algerian Army, ordered an investigation to determine the cause of the accident. Russia stated that it would assist in the investigation.

== See also ==
- List of accidents and incidents involving military aircraft (2010–2019)
