= Highway of the Hauts Plateaux =

Road in Algeria

A2 autoroute

Route information
- Length: 1,020 km (630 mi)

Major junctions
- From: Algeria-Tunisia border
- West end: Algeria-Morocco border

Location
- Country: Algeria
- Major cities: Tébessa, Khenchela, Batna, M'Sila, Boughezoul, Tiaret, Saida, El Aricha

Highway system
- Transport in Algeria

Highway of the Hauts Plateaux is a highway of 1020 km under construction in Algeria.

== Project ==
This structuring motorway project is part of the scheme and motorway road master 2005 / 2025 in order to open up and link the cities in the highland areas of the interior, in parallel to the East–West Highway.

It runs through the wilayas of Tlemcen on the border with Morocco, Saida, Tiaret, Médéa, M'sila, Batna, Oum El Bouaghi, Khenchela and Tébessa on the border with Tunisia.

The project is divided into three lots:

- West Lot : Going to Aricha in Tiaret, through Saida about 305 km
- Lot Centre : Ranging from Tiaret to Batna, through Boughezoul and M'sila about 495 km
- East Lot : Ranging from Batna to Tébessa, through Khenchela 220 km

== Construction ==
The lot of Construction "East" were launched on 30 October 2014 near Tazoult ( wilaya of Batna ) by the Minister of Public Works Abdelkader Kadi. This is a first section of 102 km through the municipalities of Batna, Tazoult, Timgad, Taouzient, Kais, El Hamma and Khenchela, under the direction of Algerian companies headed by Cosider Group for a period of 18 months.
