= Guelma Belkheir Airport =

- IATA: none; ICAO: none

Summary
- Airport type: Closed
- Serves: Guelma, Algeria
- Elevation AMSL: 745 ft / 227 m
- Coordinates: 36°27′11″N 7°28′7″E

Map
- Location of Guelma Belkheir Airport in Algeria

Runways
Direction	Length		Surface
Direction	ft	m	Surface
Closed
- Source: Landings.com

Guelma Belkheir Airport was a public use airport located near Guelma, Guelma, Algeria. Google Earth Historical Imagery shows the 1,494 metres (4,902 ft) asphalt runway deteriorated and unusable, with junk, storage sheds, and vegetation.

== See also ==
- Transport in Algeria
- List of airports in Algeria
