= M'Sila Airport =

- IATA: none; ICAO: none

Summary
- Airport type: Closed
- Serves: M'Sila, Algeria
- Elevation AMSL: 1,588 ft / 484 m
- Coordinates: 35°42′35″N 4°27′30″E

Map
- Location of M'Sila Airport in Algeria

Runways
Direction	Length		Surface
Direction	ft	m	Surface
Closed
- Source: Landings.com

M'Sila Airport was a public use airport located near M'Sila, M'Sila Province, Algeria. Listed coordinates show the bulldozed remains of what might have been an 800 metres (2,600 ft) runway.

== See also ==
- Transport in Algeria
- List of airports in Algeria
