= Béni Abbès Airport =

Béni Abbès Airport مطار بني عباس
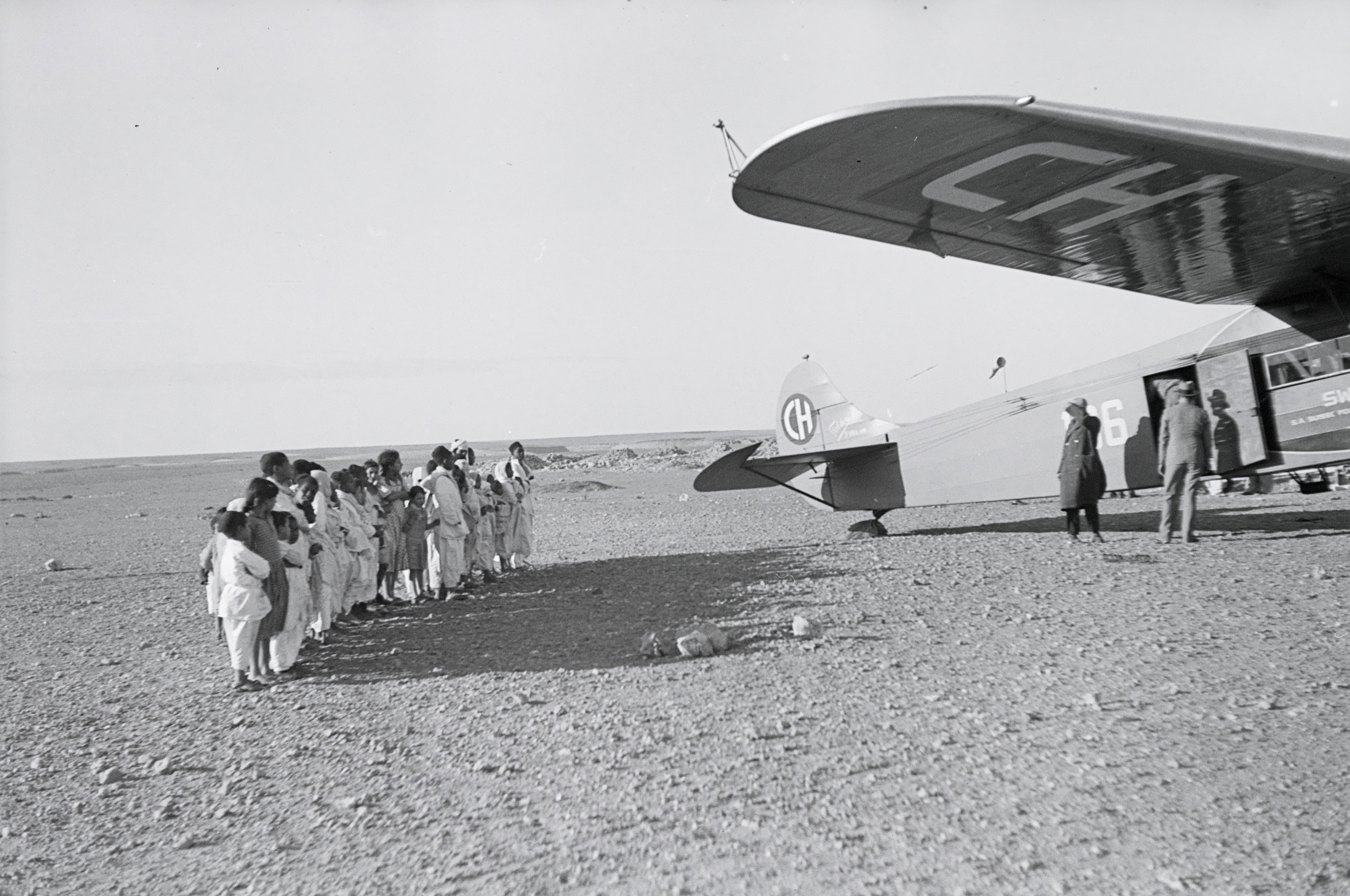
- IATA: none; ICAO: none

Summary
- Airport type: Public
- Serves: Béni Abbès, Algeria
- Elevation AMSL: 1,637 ft / 499 m
- Coordinates: 30°7′32″N 2°8′14″W

Map
- Location of Béni Abbès Airport in Algeria

Runways
Direction	Length		Surface
Direction	m	ft	Surface
08/26	1,810	5,938	Asphalt
- Source: Landings.com

Béni Abbès Airport is a public use airport located 2 kilometres (1.2 mi) east of Béni Abbès, a city in the Béchar Province of Algeria. The sand runway and ramp were paved sometime after 2007.

The Beni Abbes VOR-DME (Ident: BBS) and non-directional beacon (Ident: BBS) are located on the field.

== See also ==
- Transport in Algeria
- List of airports in Algeria
