= Tsletsi Airport =

Tletsi Airport
- IATA: none; ICAO: DAFI; LID: QDJ

Summary
- Airport type: Public
- Serves: Djelfa, Algeria
- Elevation AMSL: 3,753 ft / 1,144 m
- Coordinates: 34°40′00″N 03°21′00″E

Map

Runways
Direction	Length		Surface
Direction	m	ft	Surface
13/31	1,800	5,906	Dirt
02/20	1,105	3,625	Dirt
- Source: Landings.com Google Maps GCM

Tsletsi Airport (ICAO: DAFI) is an airport serving Djelfa, the capital of Djelfa Province in Algeria. The airport is approximately 6 kilometres (3.7 mi) east of the city.

== See also ==
- Transport in Algeria
- List of airports in Algeria
