= Algerian involvement in the Yom Kippur War =

The Yom Kippur War was an armed conflict fought from October 6 to 25, 1973, between Israel and a coalition of Arab states led by Egypt and Syria. Algeria was one of the Arab states that participated in the war, sending an expeditionary force to fight Israel.

== Algerian expeditionary force ==
The Algerian Air Force played an important role in the Yom Kippur War. Algerian pilots flew combat missions against Israeli aircraft, and they helped to support Egyptian ground forces. Algerian pilots also played a role in the defense of Cairo from Israeli air strikes.

Algeria sent a squadron of both MiG-21s and Su-7s to Egypt, which arrived at the front between October 9 and 11. Additionally, an armored brigade consisting of 150 tanks was sent, the advanced elements of which began to arrive on October 17, although they did not reach the front until October 24, too late to engage in the fighting. Following the war, during the first days of November, Algeria made a deposit of approximately US$200 million to the Soviet Union to finance arms purchases for Egypt and Syria. Algerian fighters took part in bombing Israeli targets and providing air assistance to ground operations, along with Egyptian, Iraqi and Libyan forces.
