= Saïda Airport =

- IATA: none; ICAO: none

Summary
- Airport type: Public
- Serves: Saïda
- Location: Algeria
- Elevation AMSL: 2,444 ft / 745 m
- Coordinates: 34°53′50″N 0°9′6″E

Map
- Location of Saïda Airport in Algeria

Runways
Direction	Length		Surface
Direction	m	ft	Surface
18/36	1,298	4,260	Asphalt
- Source: Landings.com Google Maps

Saïda Airport is a public use airport located near Saïda, Saïda Province, Algeria.

== See also ==
- List of airports in Algeria
