= Gara Djebilet Airport =

- IATA: none; ICAO: none

Summary
- Airport type: Public
- Serves: Âouinet Bel Egrâ
- Location: Algeria
- Elevation AMSL: 0 ft / 0 m
- Coordinates: 26°53′0.7″N 7°9′53.2″W

Map
- Location of Gara Djebilet Airport in Algeria

Runways
| Direction | Length | | Surface |
| Direction | m | ft | Surface |
|---|---|---|---|
| 09/27 | 3,011 | 9,880 | Sand |
- Source: Landings.com

Gara Djebilet Airport is a public use airport located near Âouinet Bel Egrâ, Tindouf Province, Algeria.
