= Sukhoi Su-30MKA =

Algerian variant of Indo-Russian Sukhoi Su-30MKI fighter aircraft

Su-30MKA
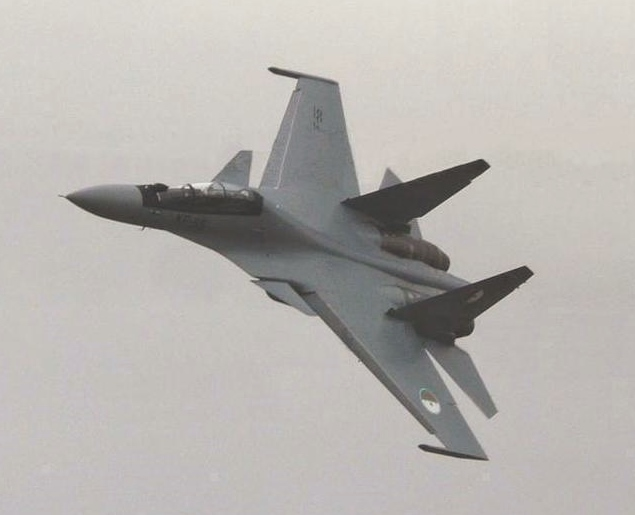
- Image of a Sukhoi Su-30MKA overflying the Aguenar – Hadj Bey Akhamok Airport in Tamanrasset, southern Algeria.

General information
- Type: Heavyweight multirole combat jet aircraft
- National origin: Russia
- Designer: Sukhoi
- Status: In service
- Primary user: Algerian Air Force
- Number built: 65-78

History
- Manufactured: 2007-present
- Introduction date: 2007 (Algeria)
- Developed from: Sukhoi Su-30MKI

The Sukhoi Su-30MKA (NATO reporting name: Flanker-H) is a twinjet multirole air superiority fighter developed by Russia's Sukhoi made for the Algerian Air Force. A variant of the Sukhoi Su-27S, it is a heavy, all-weather, long-range fighter. The aircraft is based on the Indian Sukhoi Su-30MKI III and is the 2nd adaptation of the same, after the first one being the Malaysian Sukhoi Su-30MKM.

Development of the variant started after Algeria signed a deal with Russia in 2006 to manufacture 28 Su-30MKA fighters. The Su-30MKA is tailor-made for Algerian specifications and integrates Indian systems and avionics as well as French sub-systems. It has abilities similar to the Sukhoi Su-37 with which it shares many features and components. The first Russian-made Su-30MKA variant was accepted into the Algerian Air Force in 2007.

The AAF has 63 Su-30MKAs in inventory as of December 2023.

== Development ==
=== Origins and acquisition ===
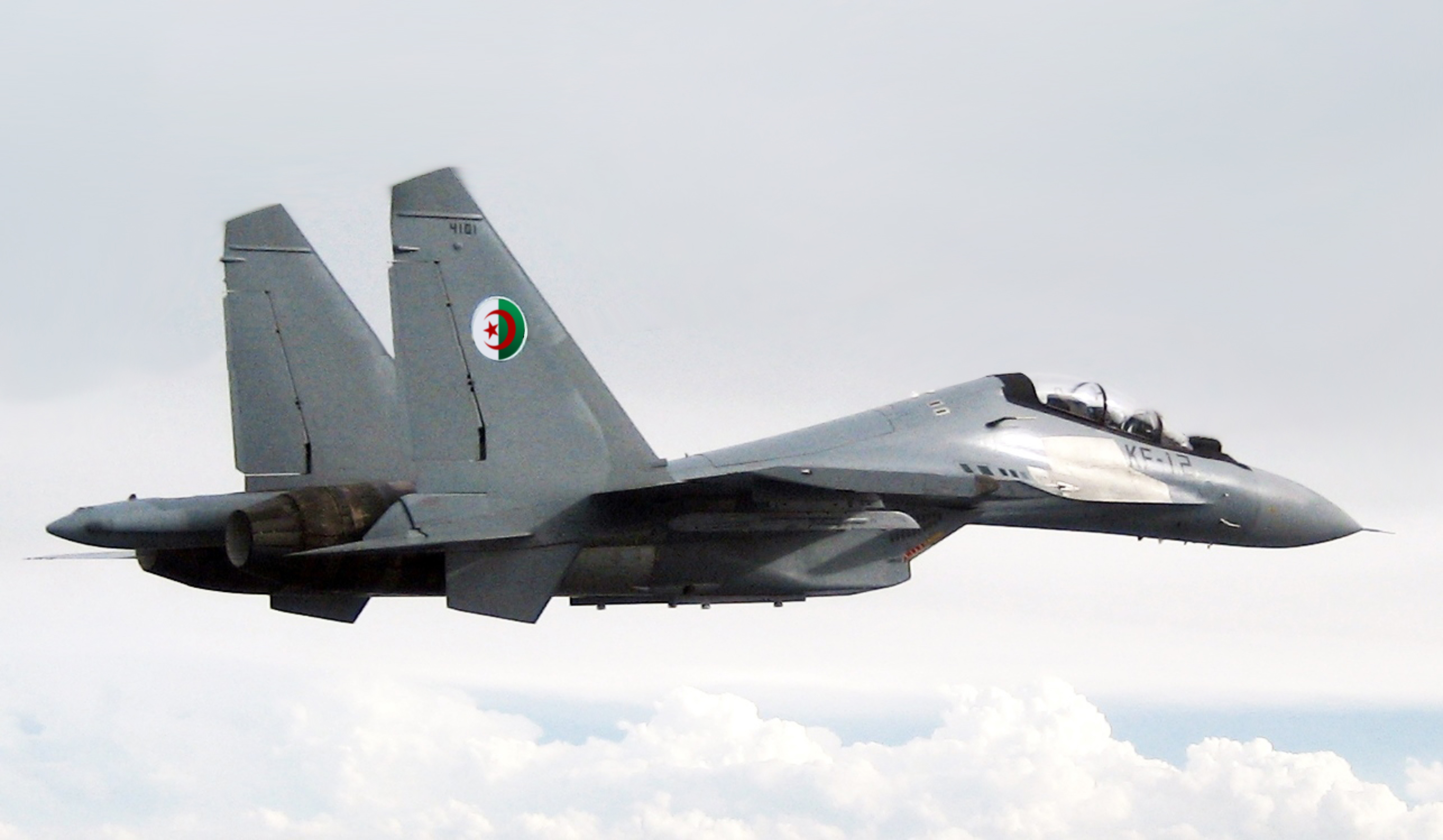
Su-30MKA in flight

The Su-30MKA was designed by Russia's Sukhoi Corporation beginning in 2006. The Su-30MKA is derived from the Sukhoi Su-27S and has a fusion of technology from the Su-37 demonstrator and Su-30MKI III program, being more advanced than the baseline Su-27S. It features state-of-the-art avionics developed by Russia, India, and France for display, navigation, targeting, and electronic warfare.

In 2006, Algeria signed a deal for 28 Russian-produced Su-30MKAs in 2 batches and 34 MiG-29 9.19. The AAF signed a contract for new MiG-29 9.19 and MIG29UBT but received used and defective airframes, as a result the AAF stopped paying for the MiG-29 9.19 and MIG29UBT, in response the Russian government ceased delivery of Su-30MKAs. Later a deal was made to return the defective MiG-29 airframes to Russia, the Russian government has since resumed deliveries of Su-30MKAs at a lower cost and the defective airframes have since been returned. Resulting in total number ordered at 44 Su-30MKAs. In 2015, another order of 14 Su-30MKAs was placed. In 2018, the planned fleet strength was to be 58 aircraft. In 2019, it was reported that Algeria and Russia signed a contract for 16 more Su-30MKAs.

As of December 2023, 7 aircraft of the 2019 Deal were delivered.

=== Upgrades ===
Sukhoi has offered a range of upgrades for Flanker H airframes, including integration of new AL-41F1S engines to provide a longer range, lower maintenance needs and greater manoeuvrability, as well as new radars. These include the N035 Irbis-E used on the Su-35S/SU27BM, SU27SM2 and SU27SM3 with an unrivalled wide aspect detection and formidable capabilities against stealth targets, N035 Irbis E is capable of detecting 3M2 targets from 375 km, compared to 140 km to the current N011M radar used on the SU30MKA. Su-27S have long been prized for their ability to carry very large sensors, which makes their situational awareness even with older radar designs very formidable. The most important update of the upgrade Sukhoi offer is the RCS reduction.

The Su30MKA rcs is 20m2 and the SU35S rcs is 3.5m2, this is achieved by incorporating RAM, putting radar blockers in the engine and suppressing the canards. The Algerian SU30MKA primary weakness is its RCS. The cost of an upgrade package would be difficult to estimate depending on how ambitious it is and what portion of the fleet receives it, but it could well cost around $2 billion or more if full comprehensive upgrades and large supplies of new armaments are commissioned for all 63 fighters. It is important to know that the N035 Irbis E radar is just a modification of the N011M radar, this upgrade is called SU30SME2.

== Design ==
=== Characteristics ===
The Su-30MKA is a highly integrated twin-tailed aircraft. The airframe is constructed of titanium and high-strength aluminium alloys. The engine intake ramps and nacelles are fitted with trouser fairings to provide a continuous streamlined profile between the nacelles and the tail beams. The fins and horizontal tail consoles are attached to tail beams. The central beam section between the engine nacelles consists of the equipment compartment, fuel tank and the brake parachute container. The fuselage head is of semi-monocoque construction and includes the cockpit, radar compartments and the avionics bay.

The Su-30MKA aerodynamic configuration is a longitudinal triplane with relaxed stability. The canard increases the aircraft lift ability and deflects automatically to allow high angle of attack (AoA) flights allowing it to perform maneuvers such as Pugachev's Cobra. The integral aerodynamic configuration combined with thrust vectoring results in extremely capable manoeuvrability, taking off and landing characteristics. This high agility allows rapid deployment of weapons in any direction as desired by the crew. The canard notably assists in controlling the aircraft at large angles of attack and bringing it to a level flight condition. The aircraft has a fly-by-wire (FBW) with quadruple redundancy. Dependent on flight conditions, signals from the control stick position transmitter or the FCS may be coupled to remote control amplifiers and combined with feedback signals from acceleration sensors and rate gyros. The resultant control signals are coupled to the high-speed electro-hydraulic actuators of the elevators, rudders and the canard. The output signals are compared and, if the difference is significant, the faulty channel is disconnected. FBW is based on a stall warning and barrier mechanism which prevents stalls through dramatic increases of control stick pressure, allowing a pilot to effectively control the aircraft without exceeding the angle of attack and acceleration limitations. Although the maximum angle of attack is limited by the canards, the FBW acts as an additional safety mechanism.

The Su-30MKA has a range of 3,000 km with internal fuel which ensures a 3.75 hour combat mission. Also, it has an in-flight refueling (IFR) probe that retracts beside the cockpit during normal operation. The air refueling system increases the flight duration up to 10 hours with a range of 3,000 km combat radius. Su-30MKAs can also use the Cobham 754 buddy refueling pods.

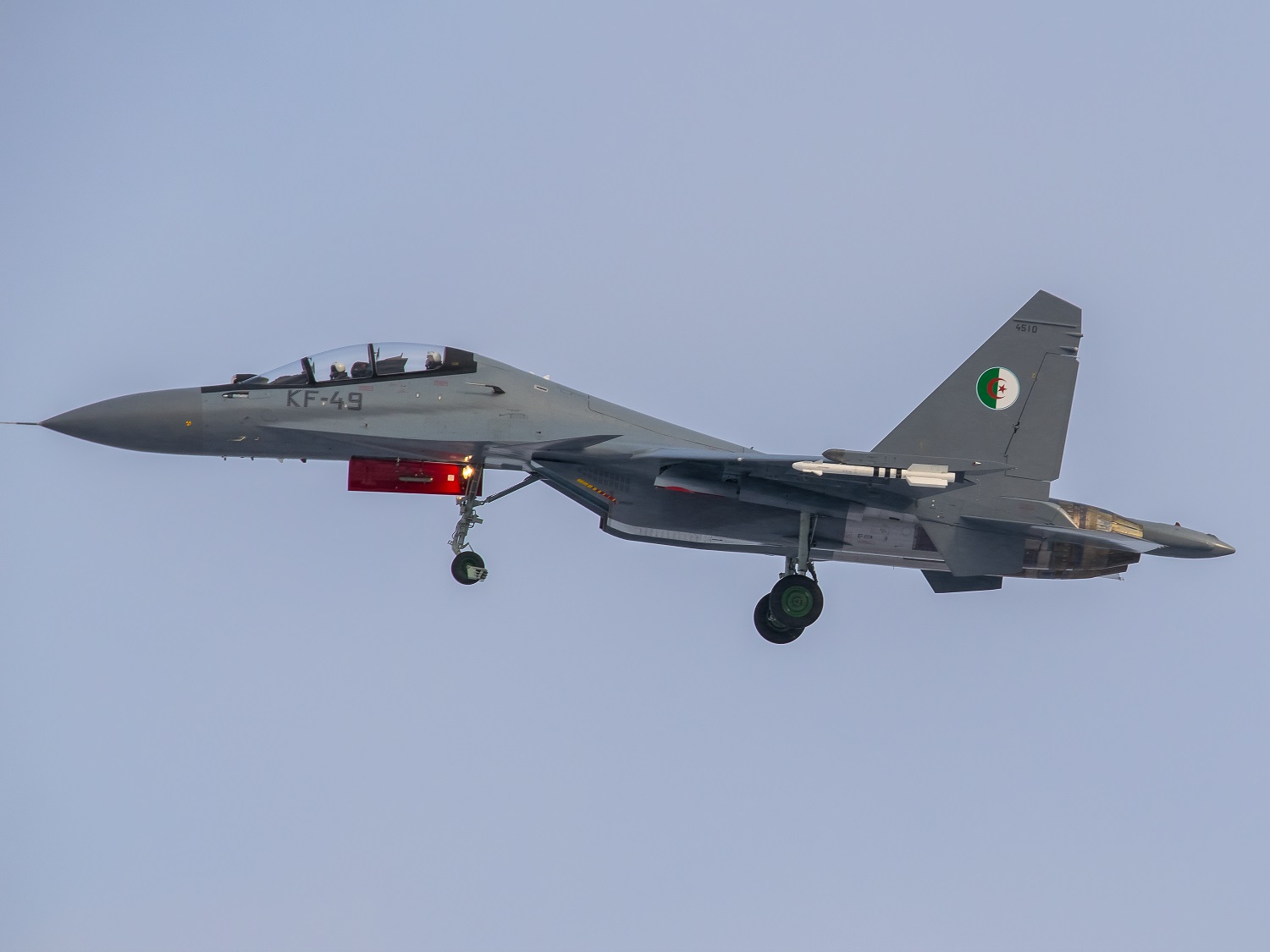
Su-30MKA during testing

The Su-30MKA's radar cross-section (RCS) is reportedly 4M2 with clean wings and 20M2 with payload.

=== Cockpit ===
The Su-30MKA on-board health and usage monitoring system (HUMS) monitors almost every aircraft system and sub-system, and can also act as an engineering data recorder. From 2010, indigenously designed and built HUDs and Multi-Function Displays (MFD) were produced by the Delhi-based Samtel Group Display Systems.

The crew are provided with zero-zero NPP Zvezda K-36DM ejection seats. The rear seat is raised for better visibility. The cockpit is provided with containers to store food and water reserves, a waste disposal system and extra oxygen bottles. The K-36DM ejection seat is inclined at 30°, to help the pilot resist aircraft accelerations in air combat.

=== Avionics ===
The forward-facing NIIP N011M MK3 is a powerful integrated passive electronically scanned array (PESA) radar. The N011M MK3 is a digital multi-mode dual frequency band radar.The N011M MK3 can function in air-to-air and air-to-land/sea mode simultaneously while being tied into a high-precision laser-inertial or GPS navigation system. It is equipped with a modern digital weapons control system as well as anti-jamming features. N011M has a 400 km search range and a maximum 200 km tracking range, and 60 km in the rear hemisphere. The radar can track 15 air targets and engage 4 simultaneously. These targets can even include cruise missiles and motionless helicopters. The Su-30MKA can function as a mini-AWACS as a director or command post for other aircraft. The target co-ordinates can be transferred automatically to at least four other aircraft. The radar can detect ground targets such as tanks at 40–50 km.

OLS-30 laser-optical Infra-red search and track includes a day and night FLIR capability and is used in conjunction with the helmet mounted sighting system. The OLS-30 is a combined IRST/LR device using a cooled, broad waveband sensor. Detection range is up to 90 km, while the laser ranger is effective to 3.5 km. Targets are displayed on the same LCD display as the radar.

The aircraft is fitted with a satellite navigation system (A-737 GPS compatible), which permits it to make flights in all weather, day and night. The navigation complex includes the high accuracy SAGEM Sigma-95 integrated global positioning system and ring laser gyroscope inertial navigation system.

Sukhoi Su-30MKA has electronic counter-measure systems. The RWR system is of Indian design, developed by India's DRDO, called Tarang, (Wave in English). It has direction finding capability and is known to have a programmable threat library. The RWR is derived from work done on an earlier system for India's MiG-23BNs known as the Tranquil, which is now superseded by the more advanced Tarang series.

=== Propulsion ===
The Su-30MKA is powered by two Lyulka-Saturn AL-31FP turbofans, each rated at 12,500 kgf (27,550 lbf) of full after-burning thrust, which enable speeds of up to Mach 2 in horizontal flight and a rate of climb of 230 m/s. The mean time between overhaul is reportedly 1,000 hours with a full-life span of 3,000 hours; the titanium nozzle has a mean time between overhaul of 500 hours. In early 2015, Defence Minister Manohar Parrikar stated before Parliament that the AL-31FP had suffered numerous failures, between the end of 2012 and early 2015, a total of 69 Su-30MKA engine-related failures had occurred; commons causes were bearing failures due to metal fatigue and low oil pressure, in response several engine modifications were made to improve lubrication, as well as the use of higher quality oil and adjustments to the fitting of bearings.

The Su-30MKA's AL-31FP powerplant built on the earlier AL-31FU, adding two-plane thrust vectoring nozzles are mounted 32 degrees outward to longitudinal engine axis (i.e. in the horizontal plane) and can be deflected ±15 degrees in one plane. The canting allows the aircraft to produce both roll and yaw by vectoring each engine nozzle differently; this allows the aircraft to create thrust vectoring moments about all three rotational axes, pitch, yaw and roll. Engine thrust is adjusted via a conventional engine throttle lever as opposed to a strain-gauge engine control stick. The aircraft is controlled by a standard control stick. The pilot can activate a switch for performing difficult maneuvers; while this is enabled, the computer automatically determines the deflection angles of the swiveling nozzles and aerodynamic surfaces.

== Operational history ==
It has been seen on multiple occasions violating the border of Mali at low altitudes, though no records state that the aircraft has been involved in direct combat.

== Accidents and incidents ==
A Sukhoi Su-30MKA belonging to the Air Force's 121st Fighter Squadron crashed during a routine exercise, near Mechta Draa Tafza in Ain Zitoun commune, wilaya of Oum El Bouaghi in January 2020. The two pilots did not survive the crash. It is not known why the two pilots were unable to eject from the cockpit.

On March 18, 2025, a Sukhoi Su-30MKA from the Air Force's 121st Fighter Squadron crashed in Adrar province with the two pilots dead.

== Specifications (Su-30MKA) ==
Specs from Irkut Corporation, Sukhoi

General characteristics

- Crew: 2
- Length: 21.935 m (72 ft 0 in)
- Wingspan: 14.7 m (48 ft 3 in)
- Height: 6.36 m (20 ft 10 in)
- Wing area: 62 m^{2} (670 sq ft)
- Empty weight: 18,400 kg (40,565 lb)
- Gross weight: 26,090 kg (57,519 lb) (typical mission weight)
- Max takeoff weight: 38,800 kg (85,539 lb)
- Powerplant: 2 × Lyulka AL-31FP afterburning turbofan engines, 123 kN (28,000 lbf) with afterburner
- Thrust/weight: 0.65

Performance

- Maximum speed: 2,120 km/h (1,320 mph, 1,140 kn) / Mach 2.0 at high altitude

1,350 km/h (840 mph; 730 kn) / M1.09 at low altitude

- Range: 3,000 km (1,900 mi, 1,600 nmi) at high altitude

1,270 km (790 mi; 690 nmi) at low altitude

- Ferry range: 8,000 km (5,000 mi, 4,300 nmi) with two in-flight refuellings
- Service ceiling: 17,300 m (56,800 ft)
- g limits: +9
- Rate of climb: 300 m/s (59,000 ft/min) +
- Wing loading: 401 kg/m^{2} (82 lb/sq ft)

Armament

- Guns: 1 × 30 mm Gryazev-Shipunov GSh-30-1 autocannon
- Hardpoints: 12 hardpoints (2 × wing-tip AAM launch rails, 6 × pylons under-wing, 2 × pylon under-engine nacelles, and 2 × pylons along the centerline between the engines. The number of pylons can be increased to 14 via use of multiple ejector racks). With a capacity of up to 8,130 kg (17,920 lb), with provisions to carry combinations of:
  - Rockets:
    - 4 x S-8 Series
    - 4 x S-13 series
    - 4 x S-25 series
  - Missiles:
    - Air-to-air missiles:
      - 10 × RVV-AE
      - 6 × RVV-MD
      - 6 x R-27ER/ET
    - Air-to-surface missiles:
      - 3 × Kh-59MK
      - 6 × Kh-29T/L
    - Anti-ship missiles:
      - 3 × Kh-59MK
      - 4 × Kh-35
      - 6 × Kh-31A
    - Anti-radiation missiles:
      - 6 × Kh-31P
  - Bombs:
    - 8 × FAB-500T bombs

- KNIRTI SAP-518 EW pod
- Chaffs / flares
- Buddy-buddy refuelling pod

Avionics

- N011M radar
- DRDO Tarang MK.II radar warning receiver
- OLS-30 laser-optical infra-red search and track

== See also ==
- Sukhoi Su-30MKI
- Sukhoi Su-30MKK
- Sukhoi Su-30MKM
- Sukhoi Su-35
- Sukhoi Su-37
