= Béchar Ouakda aerodrome =

Béchar Ouakda Airport
- IATA: none; ICAO: DAOC

Summary
- Airport type: Public
- Serves: Béchar
- Location: Algeria
- Elevation AMSL: 2,660 ft / 811 m
- Coordinates: 31°38′34.7″N 2°11′3.7″W

Map
- Location of Béchar Airport in Algeria

Runways
Direction	Length		Surface
Direction	m	ft	Surface
07/25	1,201	3,940	ASPHALT
02/20	454	1,490	DIRT
- Source: Landings.com

Béchar Ouakda Airport (ICAO: DAOC) is a public use airport located near Béchar, Béchar Province, Algeria. It is adjacent to the city and 8 kilometres (5.0 mi) east of Boudghene Ben Ali Lotfi Airport.

== See also ==
- List of airports in Algeria
