= Chlef International Airport =

Airport in Algeria

Chlef International Airport مطار الشلف – أبو بكر بلقايد (Arabic)
- IATA: CFK; ICAO: DAOI

Summary
- Airport type: Public
- Serves: Chlef, Algeria
- Elevation AMSL: 153 m (502 ft)
- Coordinates: 36°12′55″N 1°20′00″E
- Website: www.aeroport-chlef.com

Map
- Location of airport in Algeria

Runways
Direction	Length		Surface
Direction	m	ft	Surface
08/26	2,800	9,186	Asphalt
07/25	1,650	5,413	Asphalt
- Sources: Algerian AIP, Airport, DAFIF Landings.com

Chlef International Airport (IATA: CFK, ICAO: DAOI), also known as Aboubakr Belkaid Airport, is an airport 5 kilometres (3.1 mi) north of the city of Chlef, in Algeria.

The DAOI-Chlef VOR/DME (Ident: CLF) is located on the field.

During World War II, the facility was known as "Warnier Airfield". It was a major Twelfth Air Force base of operations during the North African Campaign against the German Afrika Korps.

== Airlines and destinations ==
The following airlines operate regular scheduled and charter flights at Chlef Airport:

Airlines	Destinations
Air Algérie	Algiers, Marseille, Paris–Charles de Gaulle
ASL Airlines France	Seasonal: Paris–Charles de Gaulle

== See also ==
- List of airports in Algeria
- Transport in Algeria
