= Oum El Achar =

- Village
- Location within Algeria
- Coordinates: 28°42′52″N 8°28′56″W
- Country: Algeria
- Province: Tindouf Province
- District: Tindouf District
- Commune: Tindouf
- Elevation: 353 m (1,158 ft)
- Time zone: UTC+1 (CET)

Oum El Achar is a village in the commune of Tindouf, in Tindouf Province, Algeria, located at the base of a mountain pass. It is connected to the N50 national highway by a long local road leading south from the village.
