= Zahia Benarous =

Algerian journalist and politician (born 1958)

- زهية بن عروس

Senator of the Council of the Nation
- President: Abdelaziz Bouteflika

Secretary of State for Culture
- In office 1997–1999
- President: Liamine Zéroual
- Prime Minister: Ahmed Ouyahia

Personal details
- Born: 10 June 1958 (age 67) M'Sila, Algeria
- Education: Jugurtha Elementary School; Omar Rasem Intermediate
- Alma mater: University of Algiers 1

Zahia Benarous (born 10 June 1958) is an Algerian journalist and politician. She was a presenter on Public Establishment of Television's 8pm news, was elected as a Member of the Parliament of Algeria in 1997 and then was appointed to two terms as senator of the upper house of the Algerian Senate.

== Biography ==
Benarous was born on 10 June 1958 in M'Sila, Algeria. She was educated at the Jugurtha Elementary School and the Omar Rasem Intermediate in Algiers. She then studied a bachelor's degree in social sciences at the University of Algiers 1.

Benarous worked as a television presenter on Public Establishment of Television's 8pm news from 1988, and was the first woman to present in Arabic. In 2017, Benarous suggested that Libyan leader Muammar al-Qaddafi proposed marriage to her in 1995 after seeing her on television, despite how they had not met.

Benarous was elected as a Member of the Parliament of Algeria in 1997 as a member of the centre-right Democratic National Rally (NDA) party. She was appointed as Secretary of State for Culture, in Ahmed Ouyahia's second government in June 1997. She served until 1999, then was appointed to two terms as senator of the upper house of the Algerian Senate (known as the Conseil de la Nation) by President Abdelaziz Bouteflika.

In 2006, Benarous was elected to the Inter-Parliamentary Union (IPU) Committee on the Human Rights of Parliamentarians.

In 2021, the National Independent Electoral Authority (ANIE) of Algeria rejected Benarous' candidacy for the El Houkm Errached (Wise Governance) party as contradictory to new electoral law (Article 200) which prohibits candidacies for individuals who have already served two consecutive or non-consecutive parliamentary terms.
