= Bou Saada Airport =

Airport in Bou Saada, Algeria

- IATA: BUJ; ICAO: DAAD

Summary
- Airport type: Public
- Serves: Bou Saada, Algeria
- Elevation AMSL: 459 m / 1,506 ft
- Coordinates: 35°20′00″N 4°12′20″E

Map
- Location of the airport in Algeria

Runways
Direction	Length		Surface
Direction	m	ft	Surface
04L/22R	2,200	7,218	Asphalt
- Sources: Algerian AIP & World Aero Data Landings.com

Bou Saada Airport (IATA: BUJ, ICAO: DAAD), is an airport located 7.5 NM (13.9 km; 8.6 mi) north of Bou Saada, Algeria.

== Airlines and destinations ==
Airlines	Destinations
Air Algérie	Algiers, Laghouat, Touggourt
