= Bousfer Air Base =

Bousfer Air Base Base Aérienne de Bousfer
- IATA: none; ICAO: DAOE

Summary
- Airport type: Military
- Serves: Bousfer
- Location: Algeria
- Elevation AMSL: 187 ft / 57 m
- Coordinates: 35°44′6.7″N 000°48′19.3″W

Map
- Location of Bousfer Air Base in Algeria

Runways
Direction	Length		Surface
Direction	ft	m	Surface
07/25	9,800	2,987	Concrete
- Source: Landings.com

Bousfer Air Base (French: Base Aérienne de Bousfer, ICAO: DAOE) is a military airport located 3 kilometres (2 mi) north of Bousfer, Oran, Algeria.

== See also ==
- List of airports in Algeria
