= Boufarik Airport =

Boufarik Air Base
- IATA: none; ICAO: DAAK

Summary
- Airport type: Military
- Serves: Boufarik, Algeria
- Elevation AMSL: 102 m / 335 ft
- Coordinates: 36°32′45″N 2°52′34″E

Map
- Location of airport in Algeria

Runways
Direction	Length		Surface
Direction	m	ft	Surface
04/22	3,622	11,883	Concrete
- Source: DAFIF Landings.com Google Maps

Boufarik Airport (ICAO: DAAK) is a military airport near Boufarik, Algeria. It is the home base for the Air Transport fleet of the Algerian Air Force.

== History ==
On 3 May 1943, Charles de Gaulle landed at Boufarik airport, flying in from Gibraltar. He would remain based in Algeria until mid-1944 and the Liberation of France.

On 11 April 2018, an Ilyushin Il-76 operated by the Algerian Air Force crashed just after takeoff from this airport, killing about 257 passengers on board.
