= Oum el Bouaghi Airport =

Oum el Bouaghi Airport Aéroport d'Oum el Bouaghi
- IATA: none; ICAO: DABO

Summary
- Airport type: Public
- Serves: Aïn Beïda
- Location: Algeria
- Elevation AMSL: 3,150 ft / 960 m
- Coordinates: 35°52′39.1″N 007°15′25.9″E

Map
- Location of Oum el Bouaghi Airport in Algeria

Runways
Direction	Length		Surface
Direction	ft	m	Surface
16/34	12,100	3,688	Concrete
07/25	12,100	3,688	Concrete
- Source: Landings.com

Oum el Bouaghi Airport French: Aéroport d'Oum el Bouaghi (ICAO: DABO) is a military airport located near Aïn Beïda, Oum El Bouaghi, Algeria.

== See also ==
- List of airports in Algeria
