= Aïn Oussera Airport =

- IATA: none; ICAO: DAAQ

Summary
- Airport type: Military
- Serves: Aïn Oussera
- Location: Algeria
- Elevation AMSL: 2,132 ft / 650 m
- Coordinates: 35°31′31.5″N 002°52′43.4″E

Map
- Location of Aïn Oussera Airport in Algeria

Runways
Direction	Length		Surface
Direction	ft	m	Surface
09L/27R	10,600	3,231	Asphalt
09R/27L	10,550	3,216	Asphalt
- Source: Landings.com

Aïn Oussera Airport (ICAO: DAAQ) is a military airport located near Aïn Oussera, Djelfa, Algeria.

== See also ==
- List of airports in Algeria
