= Boudghene Ben Ali Lotfi Airport =

Boudghene Ben Ali Lotfi Airport Aéroport de Bechar "Boudghene Ben Ali Lotfi"
- IATA: CBH; ICAO: DAOR

Summary
- Airport type: Public / Military
- Location: Béchar, Algeria
- Elevation AMSL: 2,661 ft / 811 m
- Coordinates: 31°39′16.8″N 02°15′40.3″W

Map
- Location of airport in Algeria

Runways
Direction	Length		Surface
Direction	m	ft	Surface
06/24	3,732	12,245	Asphalt
18/36	2,999	9,840	Asphalt

Statistics (2013)
- Passengers: 59,165
- Passenger change 12–13: ▲23.2%
- Aircraft movements: 1,820
- Movements change 12–13: ▲4.0%
- Source: DAFIF, Landings.com, ACI's 2013 World Airport Traffic Report.

Boudghene Ben Ali Lotfi Airport (French: Aéroport de Bechar "Boudghene Ben Ali Lotfi") (IATA: CBH, ICAO: DAOR) is an airport located 5 km north of Béchar, a city in the Béchar Province of Algeria.

== Airlines and destinations ==
Airlines	Destinations
Air Algérie	Algiers, Constantine, Oran, Tindouf
Tassili Airlines	Algiers, Oran

== Statistics ==
Traffic by calendar year. Official ACI Statistics
	Passengers	Change from previous year	Aircraft operations	Change from previous year	Cargo (metric tons)	Change from previous year
2005	32,798	▼14.39%	1,557	▲0.65%	123	▼30.51%
2006	26,245	▼19.98%	1,202	▼22.80%	62	▼49.59%
2007	30,234	▲15.20%	1,272	▲5.82%	97	▲56.45%
2008	31,415	▲3.91%	1,358	▲6.76%	66	▼31.96%
2009	33,698	▲7.27%	1,396	▲2.80%	86	▲30.30%
2010	35,148	▲4.30%	1,344	▼3.72%	165	▲91.86%
2011	32,928	▼6.32%	1,342	▼0.15%	104	▼36.97%
2012	48,034	▲45.88%	1,750	▲30.40%	420	▲303.85%
2013	59,165	▲23.17%	1,820	▲4.00%	124	▼70.48%
Source: Airports Council International. World Airport Traffic Reports (Years 2005, 2006, 2007, 2009, 2011, 2012, and 2013)

== See also ==
- List of airports in Algeria
- Béchar Ouakda aerodrome
- Benali Boudghene
