= Commandant Ferradj Airport =

- IATA: TIN; ICAO: DAOF

Summary
- Airport type: joint public/military
- Serves: Tindouf
- Location: Algeria
- Elevation AMSL: 1,453 ft / 443 m
- Coordinates: 27°42′07″N 8°09′44″W

Map
- Location of Tindouf Airport in Algeria

Runways
Direction	Length		Surface
Direction	ft	m	Surface
08R/26L	9,800	2,987	Asphalt
08L/26R	9,750	2,972	Asphalt

Statistics (2010)
- Passengers: 50,976
- Passenger change 09–10: ▼16.7%
- Aircraft movements: 1,650
- Movements change 09–10: ▼10.4%
- Sources: 2010 World Airport Traffic Report. Google Maps

Commandant Ferradj Airport is an airport in Tindouf, Algeria (IATA: TIN, ICAO: DAOF).

== Airlines and destinations ==
Airlines	Destinations
Air Algérie	Algiers, Béchar, Constantine, Oran
Tassili Airlines	Algiers

== Statistics ==
Traffic by calendar year. Official ACI Statistics
	Passen- gers	Change from previous year	Aircraft opera- tions	Change from previous year	Cargo (metric tons)	Change from previous year
2005	52,074	▼27.83%	1,787	▼15.51%	153	▼48.48%
2006	49,273	▼5.38%	1,939	▲8.51%	150	▼1.96%
2007	52,402	▲6.35%	2,148	▲10.78%	44	▼70.67%
2008	57,350	▲9.44%	1,971	▼8.24%	77	▲75.00%
2009	61,196	▲6.71%	1,841	▼6.60%	58	▼24.68%
2010	50,976	▼16.70%	1,650	▼10.37%	51	▼12.07%
Source: Airports Council International. World Airport Traffic Reports (Years 2005, 2006, 2007, 2009 and 2010)
