= Tindouf =

Tindouf تندوف
- Commune and town
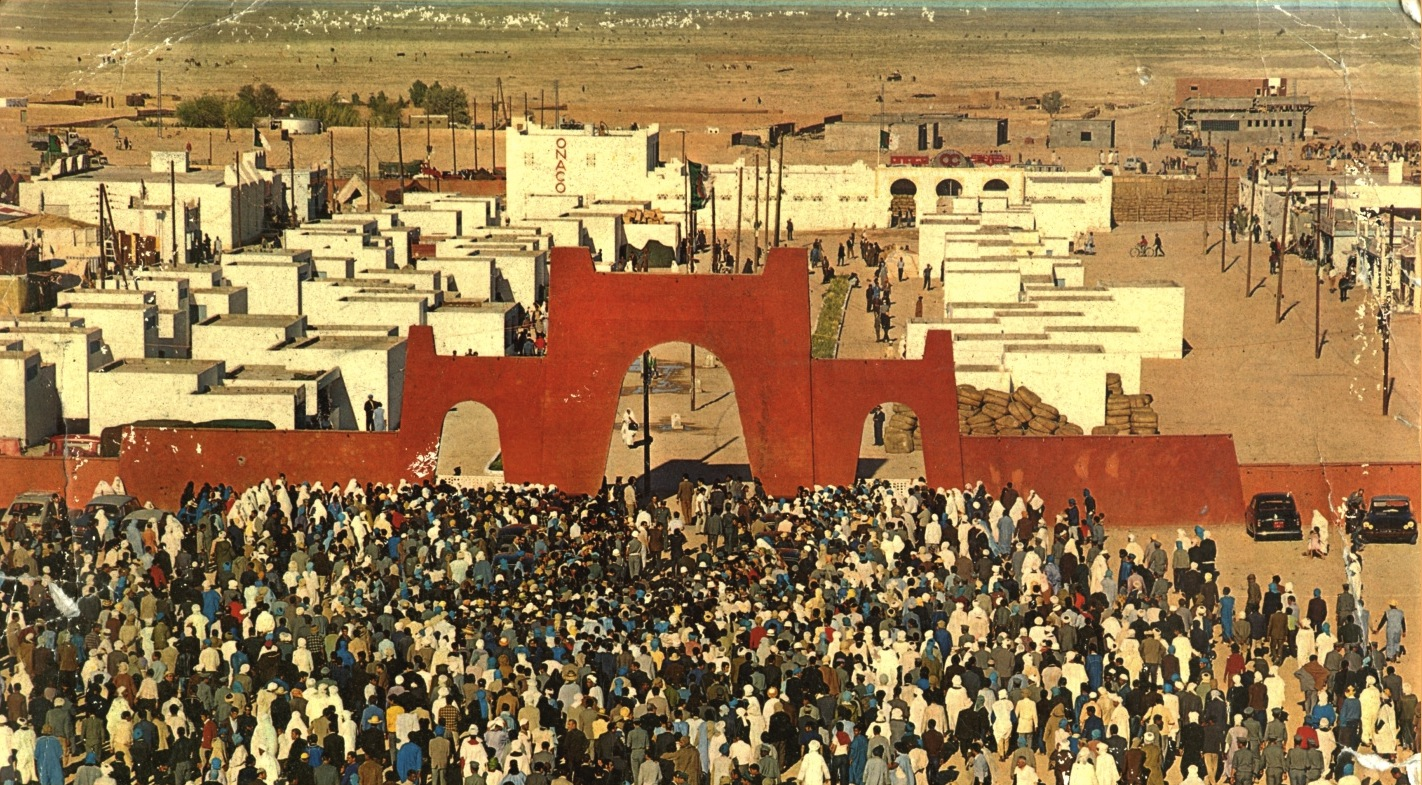
- Tindouf in the 1970s

- Location of Tindouf commune (red) within Tindouf Province

- Location of Tindouf within Algeria
- Coordinates: 27°40′31″N 8°07′43″W
- Country: Algeria
- Province: Tindouf (seat)
- District: Tindouf (coextensive)

Area
  - Total: 70,009 km^{2} (27,031 sq mi)
- Elevation: 400 m (1,300 ft)

Population (2008)
  - Total: 150,000 (of which 45,966 are not people living in the Sahrawi refugee camps)
  - Density: 2.1/km^{2} (5.5/sq mi)
- Time zone: UTC+1 (CET)
- Postal code: 37000
- Climate: BWh

Tindouf (Arabic: تندوف, romanized: Tindūf) is a commune and the main town in Tindouf Province, Algeria, close to the Mauritanian, Western Saharan and Moroccan borders.

The region is considered of strategic significance as it houses Algerian military bases and an airport with regular flights to Algiers, as well as flights to other domestic destinations. The settlement of Garet Djebilet lies within the municipal territory of Tindouf near the border with Mauritania; the settlement has an iron mine and a defunct airport, and is approximately 70 kilometres (43 mi) northwest of Âouinet Bel Egrâ. Since 1975, it also contains several Sahrawi refugee camps operated by the Polisario Front, a national liberation movement seeking the self-determination of Western Sahara.

== Name ==
According to the Algerian linguist Mohand-Akli Haddadou, the name Tindouf is derived from Tidaf, a word of Berber origin meaning “the sentinel,” in reference to the locality’s position as a lookout tower. Other explanations suggest that it is a contraction of the Tuareg word Tin (“she of”) and the Arabic word Douf (“field, plot of land”), which would mean that Tindouf signifies “she of the plot of land.” Louis Rinn, for his part, links the second component to the word Oudhef, meaning “to place, to assign, to allocate,” in which case the toponym would mean “the location,” “the allocation,” or “the lot.” For other historians, the name Tindouf simply derives from Tendefes, which refers to the temporary wells dug by nomads (Al-Bakri).

== History ==
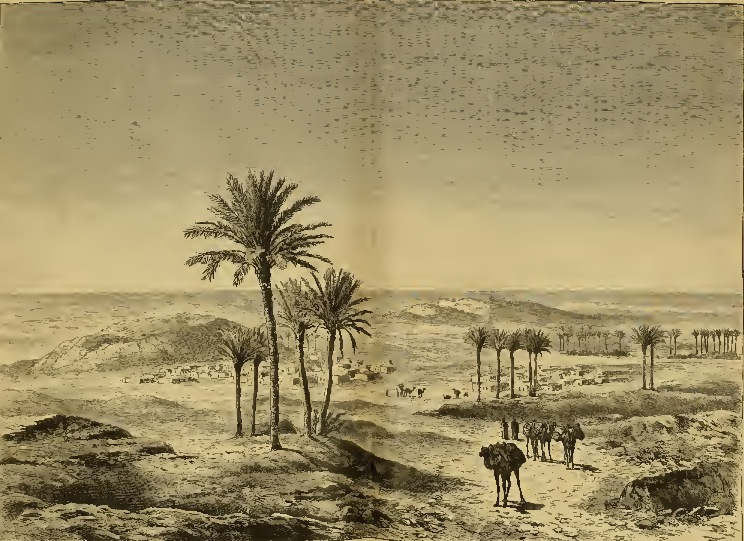
Tindouf in 1880.

The town of Tindouf was built near an isolated Saharan oasis in 1852 by members of the Tajakant tribe, but in 1895 it was sacked and destroyed by the Reguibat, another Sahrawi tribe. The Tajakant tribe were expelled from the region. It remained deserted until French troops arrived in the area in 1934 and attached the region to French Algerian territory.

In 1963, the area was the scene of fighting between Algerian and Moroccan forces laying claim to western Algeria, during the Sand War. The region has since been heavily militarized, increasing its relevance. Since the mid-70s, the Tindouf region has served as the base for the Polisario Front, a Sahrawi nationalist organization fighting for Western Sahara's independence. The Polisario Front is headquartered in self-administered refugee camps south of the city, which filled up as Moroccan and Mauritanian forces conquered Western Sahara in 1975. During the war years of 1975–1990, Polisario forces struck in Western Sahara, Mauritania (until 1979) and southern Morocco (including the region of Tata), using the Tindouf region as their rear base area with Algerian protection and support. Since 1990 the area has been quiet, although the refugee community remains in Algeria, pending a UN-sponsored peace process and a referendum on independence. (See Minurso.)

== Demographics ==
Tindouf has a population of 47,965 (2010 estimates).

Year	Population (excluding Sahrawi refugee camps)
1977 (Census)	6,044
1987 (Census)	13,084
1998 (Census)	32,004
2008 (Census)	45,966
2010 (Estimate)	47,965–59,898

== Climate ==
Tindouf has a hot desert climate (Köppen climate classification BWh), with extremely hot summers and very warm winters. There is very little rain for most of the year, generally concentrated in February and —associated with the West African Monsoon— by September–October. The region can be hit by rare events of heavy rain, such as in February 2006 or October 2015. Summer daytime temperatures commonly approach 45 °C (113 °F) with blazing sunshine, while winter nighttime temperatures can sometimes drop to 5 °C (41 °F) or less. On 31 July 2023, a maximum temperature of 48.9 °C (120.0 °F) was registered in Tindouf.

Climate data for Tindouf (1981-2010)
Month	Jan	Feb	Mar	Apr	May	Jun	Jul	Aug	Sep	Oct	Nov	Dec	Year
Mean daily maximum °C (°F)	20.9 (69.6)	23.8 (74.8)	28.3 (82.9)	30.8 (87.4)	34.2 (93.6)	39.1 (102.4)	43.8 (110.8)	42.3 (108.1)	37.8 (100.0)	32.3 (90.1)	26.3 (79.3)	21.8 (71.2)	31.8 (89.2)
Daily mean °C (°F)	13.2 (55.8)	16.2 (61.2)	20.1 (68.2)	22.4 (72.3)	25.0 (77.0)	29.3 (84.7)	35.0 (95.0)	34.3 (93.7)	29.7 (85.5)	24.2 (75.6)	19.0 (66.2)	14.4 (57.9)	23.6 (74.4)
Mean daily minimum °C (°F)	6.3 (43.3)	8.9 (48.0)	12.8 (55.0)	14.3 (57.7)	16.5 (61.7)	20.8 (69.4)	26.4 (79.5)	26.0 (78.8)	22.3 (72.1)	17.7 (63.9)	11.8 (53.2)	8.0 (46.4)	16.0 (60.8)
Average precipitation mm (inches)	2.6 (0.10)	12.4 (0.49)	4.0 (0.16)	0.6 (0.02)	2.8 (0.11)	0.8 (0.03)	0.8 (0.03)	2.3 (0.09)	12.0 (0.47)	9.9 (0.39)	1.2 (0.05)	6.5 (0.26)	55.9 (2.2)
Source: Meteo-Climat

== Transportation ==
Commandant Ferradj Airport is located to the north of Tindouf. The N50 national highway connects Tindouf to the airport as well as other Algerian settlements to the north. Following a provisional 2018 announcement on re-establishing the 860-km link between Tindouf and Zouerat in Mauritania, in 2023 the two countries agreed to develop this new trans Sahara trade route. In February 2024 the border was officially opened to non-freight traffic at a newly built facility at Hassi 75. Trucks ply the route via Bir Mogrein daily, while a handful of overland travellers take the crossing in the cooler months.

== Education ==
6.1% of the population has a tertiary education, and another 18.8% has completed secondary education. The overall literacy rate is 75.0%, and is 79.7% among males and 70.1% among females.

== Localities ==
The commune is composed of five localities:

- Tindouf-ville
- Garet Djebilet
- Aouinet Bélagraa
- Chenachène
- Oum El Achar
