= L'Mekrareg Airport =

Moulay Ahmed Medeghri Airport (Laghouat Airport)
- IATA: LOO; ICAO: DAUL

Summary
- Airport type: Public/Military
- Serves: Laghouat, Algeria
- Elevation AMSL: 765 m (2,510 ft)
- Coordinates: 33°45′51.6″N 2°55′41.5″E

Map
- Location of airport in Algeria

Runways
Direction	Length		Surface
Direction	m	ft	Surface
16R/34L	3,803	12,477	Asphalt
16L/34R	3,806	12,487	Asphalt
- Sources: DAFIF Great Circle Mapper

Moulay Ahmed Medeghri Airport (IATA: LOO, ICAO: DAUL), also known as Laghouat Airport, is an airport near Laghouat, Algeria.

== Airlines and destinations ==
Airlines	Destinations
Air Algérie	Algiers, Bou Saada
