= Âouinet Bel Egrâ =

Âouinet Bel Egrâ عوينة بلقرع
- Village
- Location within Algeria
- Coordinates: 26°49′48″N 6°53′43″W
- Country: Algeria
- Province: Tindouf Province
- District: Tindouf District
- Commune: Tindouf
- Elevation: 338 m (1,109 ft)
- Time zone: UTC+1 (CET)

Âouinet Bel Egrâ (also known as Aouinet Bélagraa) is a village in the commune of Tindouf, in Tindouf Province, Algeria. It is in the Sahara Desert, approximately 160 kilometres south-east of Tindouf. There is a Saharawi Refugee camp in the village named Dakhla.
