= M'Sila, Algeria =

M'sila المسيلة
- City
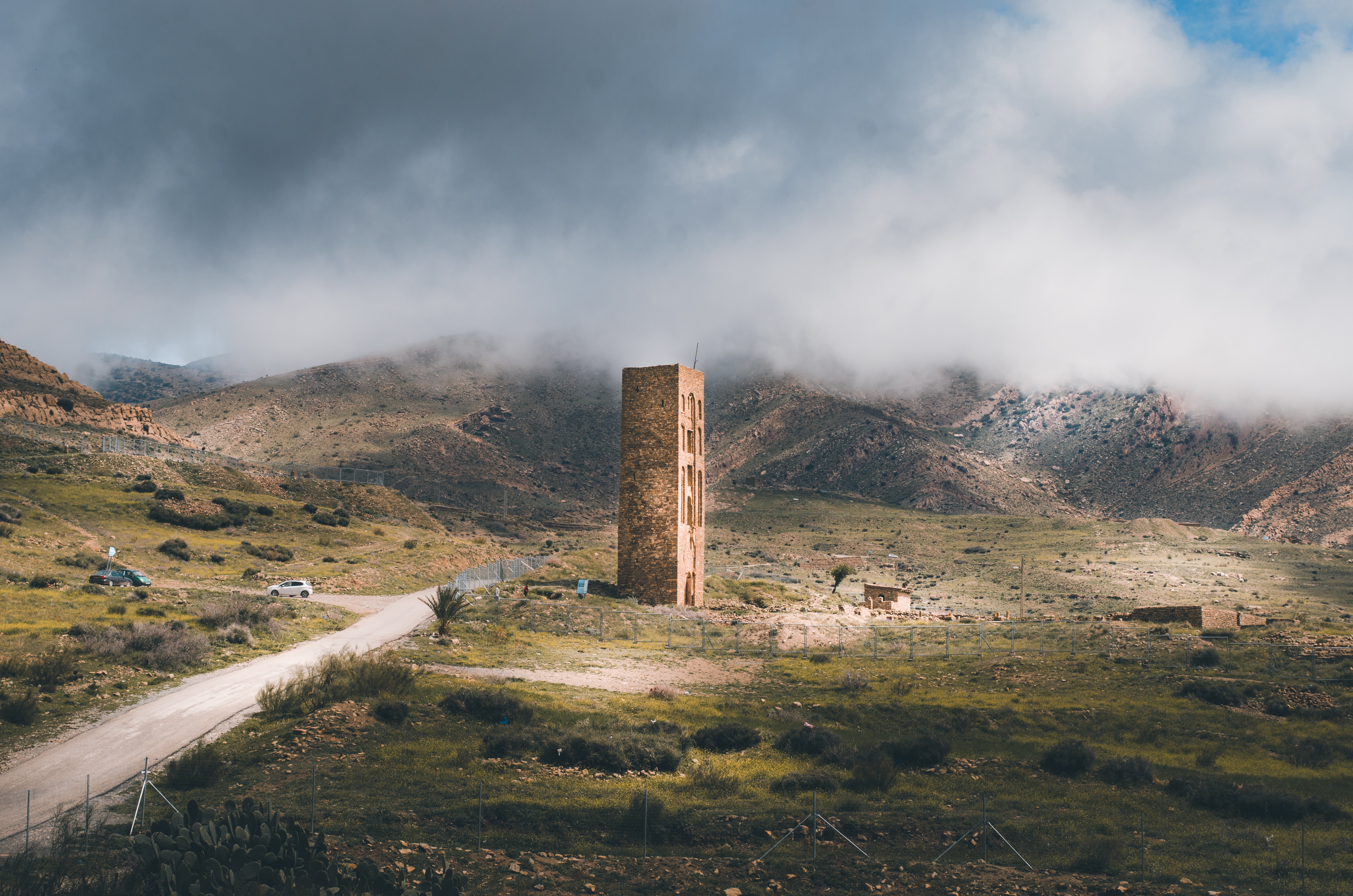
- Qal'at Bani Hammad

- Location of M'Sila in M'sila Province

- Location within Algeria
- Coordinates: 35°42′7″N 4°32′49″E
- Country: Algeria
- Province: M'Sila Province
- District: M'Sila District
- Elevation: 471 m (1,545 ft)

Population (2008 census)
  - Total: 132,975
- Time zone: UTC+1 (CET)

M'sila (also spelled Msila) (Arabic: المسيلة); is the capital of M'Sila Province, Algeria, and is co-extensive with M'sila District. It has a population of 132,975 as per the 2008 census. M'sila University is also located in this city.

== History ==
The city was founded c. 924 under the name al-Muhammadiya, named after the second Fatimid caliph, al-Qa'im, during the latter's campaign against the rebellious Berber tribes of central Algeria. Meant to cement Fatimid control over the Hodna plain, the construction of the city was entrusted to Ali ibn Hamdun al-Andalusi, who became its first governor. Much building material for the new city was taken from a nearby ruined Roman city (likely Lambaesis or Timgad).

M'sila was the location of the first village constructed as part of a government-run program to transition nomadic Algerians to sedentary life using local materials. The village, now complete, was dubbed Maader and consists of houses, public and trading areas, and a mosque. Today it is much more developed with many companies, business offices, religious centers and schools.

== Geography ==
=== Climate ===
M'sila has a cold semi-arid climate (Köppen climate classification BSk). Rainfall is higher in winter than in summer. The average annual temperature in M'Sila is 15.8 °C (60.4 °F). About 229 mm (9.02 in) of precipitation falls annually.

Climate data for M'Sila
Month	Jan	Feb	Mar	Apr	May	Jun	Jul	Aug	Sep	Oct	Nov	Dec	Year
Mean daily maximum °C (°F)	12.8 (55.0)	13.9 (57.0)	16.5 (61.7)	19.6 (67.3)	23.0 (73.4)	27.1 (80.8)	30.7 (87.3)	30.7 (87.3)	27.1 (80.8)	22.3 (72.1)	17.3 (63.1)	14.1 (57.4)	21.3 (70.3)
Mean daily minimum °C (°F)	4.1 (39.4)	4.6 (40.3)	6.3 (43.3)	8.1 (46.6)	11.0 (51.8)	14.7 (58.5)	17.2 (63.0)	17.4 (63.3)	15.7 (60.3)	11.9 (53.4)	8.2 (46.8)	5.3 (41.5)	10.4 (50.7)
Average precipitation mm (inches)	25 (1.0)	15 (0.6)	25 (1.0)	17 (0.7)	26 (1.0)	12 (0.5)	5 (0.2)	5 (0.2)	21 (0.8)	22 (0.9)	34 (1.3)	22 (0.9)	229 (9.0)
Source: Climate-Data.org, Climate data

== Economy ==
M'sila is primarily known for its farming and small business.

== Transportation ==
The city was formerly served by M'Sila Airport.

== Notable people ==
- Zahia Benarous (born 1958), Algerian journalist and politician
- Mohammed Lakhdar-Hamina (1934-2025), film director
