= Transport in Algeria =

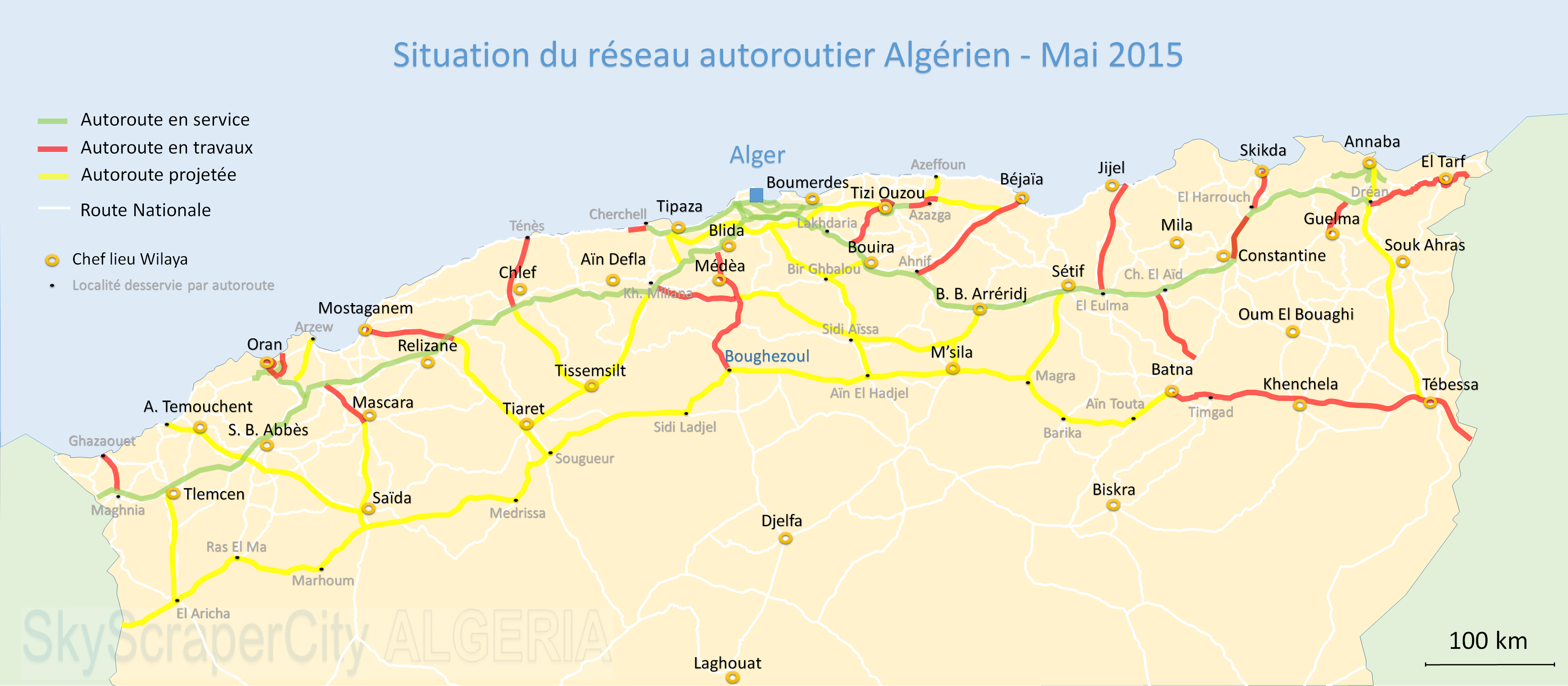
Situation of Algerian highways network in May 2015

As the tenth-largest country in the world, and the largest in Africa and in the Mediterranean region, Algeria has a vast transportation system that includes a large and diverse transportation infrastructure.

== Rail transport ==
=== Mainline rail ===
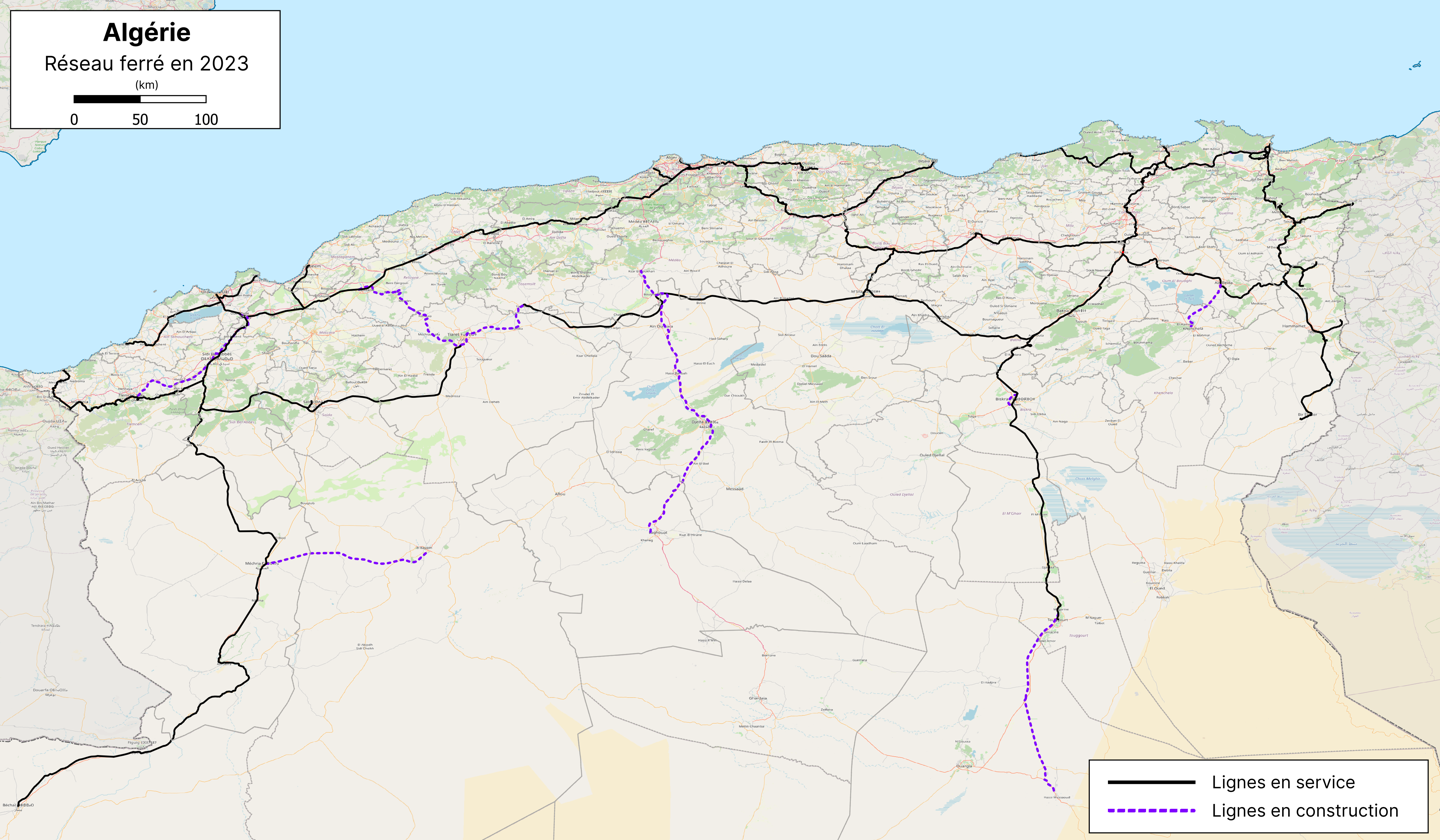
Map of operating railways in Algeria, with operating lines (black) and lines under construction (purple)

There are a total of 4,560 km (2,830 mi) of 1,435 mm (4 ft 8 1/2 in) standard gauge railways: with 480 km (300 mi) of that being electrified and 560 km (350 mi) of that being double tracked.

SNTF operates the railways, whilst a new, separate organisation, ANESRIF, has been created to manage infrastructure investment.

The High Plateau line is a major new project to build an east–west line across the country, parallel to the Rocade Nord.

=== Rapid transit ===
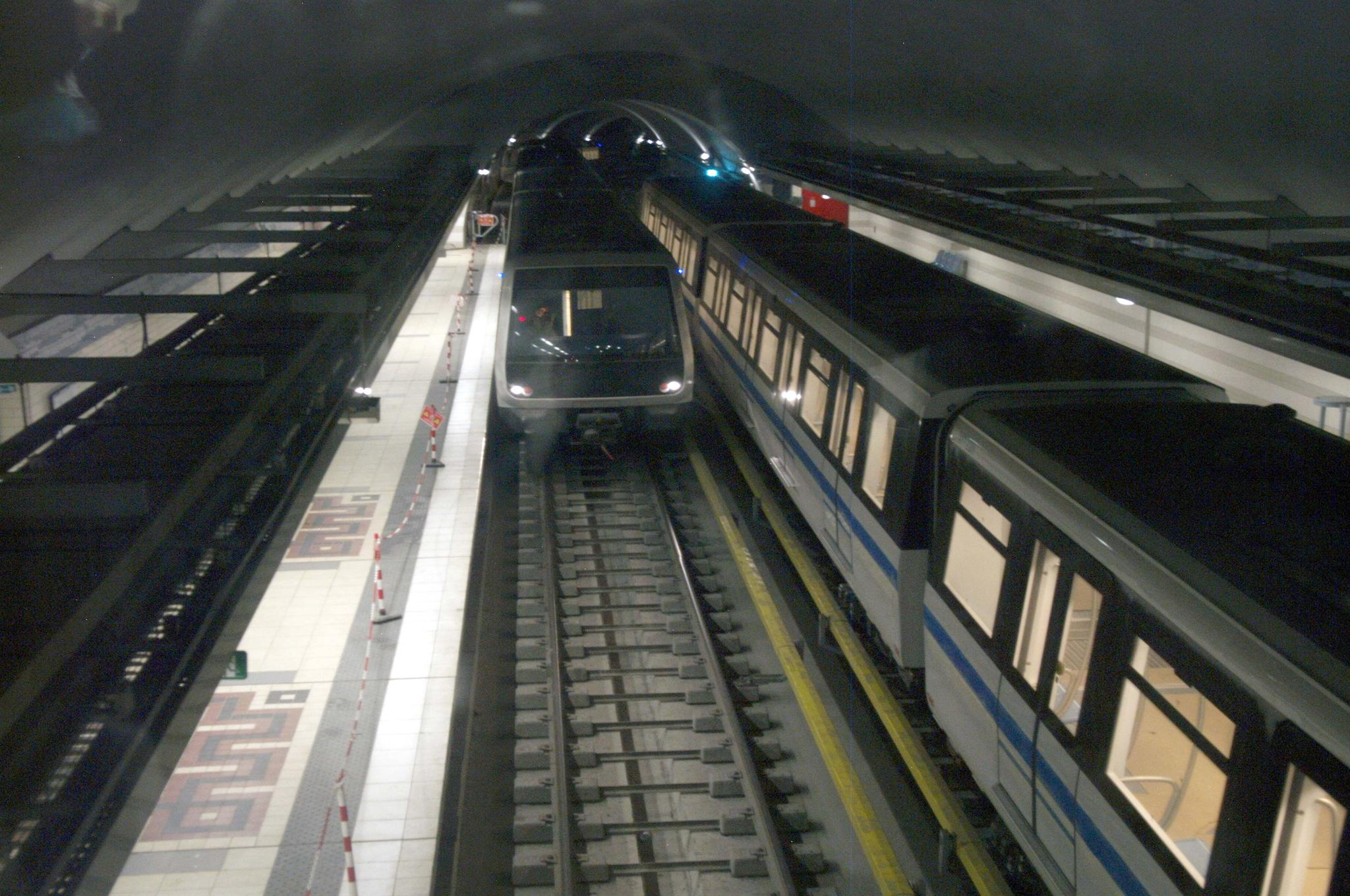
Rolling stock of the Algiers Metro

The Algiers Metro is a rapid transit system that first opened in 2011, making Algiers the first city in the Maghreb to possess this type of infrastructure. The system is mostly underground and extends over 18.2 kilometres (11.3 mi), serving 19 stations, and has an annual ridership of over 40 million passengers in 2018.

Several expansion projects are underway to ensure more extensive coverage of the capital city, with the network projected to reach a length of 60 kilometres (37 mi) and serve 58 stations in the future. Since the original expansion plans were announced, further extensions have been developed to expand the network beyond the existing 18.2 kilometers. Work is underway on extensions from El Harrach towards Houari Boumediene International Airport and from Aïn Naâdja to Baraki, which together will add approximately 15 kilometers and 15 stations. Further expansion towards Bab El Oued is also planned, with the long-term objective of creating a substantially larger metro network across the capital.

=== Tramways ===
Algeria possesses one of the highest number of tram systems among developing countries, and by far the highest number in Africa, with 7 operating systems across different major cities. Currently the cities of Algiers, Oran, Constantine, Sétif, Sidi bel Abbès, Mostaganem and Ouargla have a tram line in operation. The government, wanting to diversify the country's future in rail transport, has assigned the Entreprise Métro d'Alger to the projects.

- Algiers tramway (May 2011): 23.2 kilometres (14.4 mi) of route and 38 stops
- Oran Tramway (May 2013): 18.7 kilometres (11.6 mi) of route and 32 stops
- Constantine tramway (July 2013): 18.4 kilometres (11.4 mi) of route and 21 stops
- Sidi Bel Abbès tramway (June 2017): 13.74 kilometres (8.54 mi) of route and 22 stops
- Ouargala tramway (March 2018): 9.6 kilometres (6.0 mi) of route and 16 stops
- Sétif tramway (May 2018): 15.2 kilometres (9.4 mi) of route and 26 stops
- Mostaganem Tramway (February 2023): 14.2 kilometres (8.8 mi) kilometers of route and 24 stops

== Road transport ==
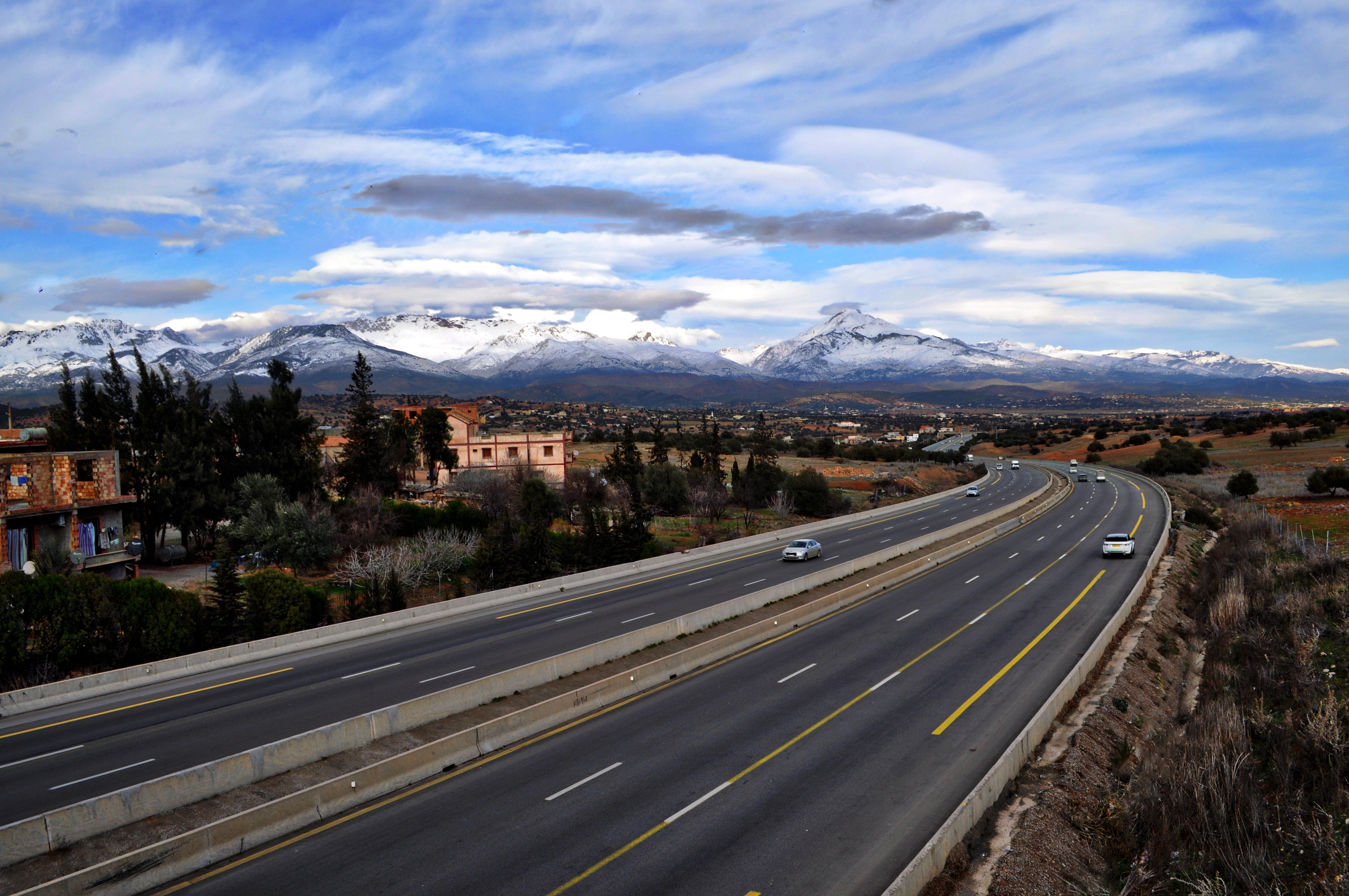
East-West Highway near Bouïra

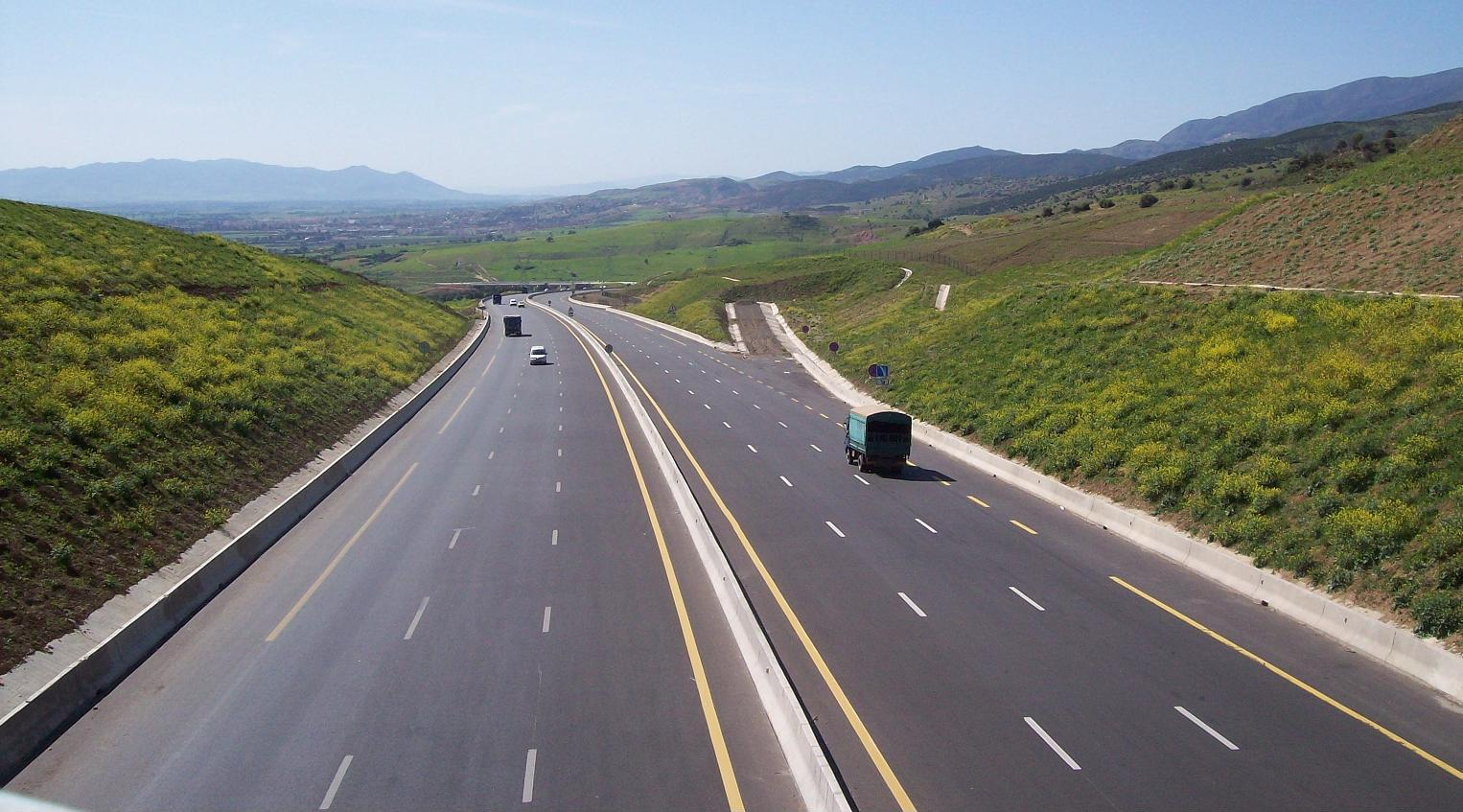
East-West Highway near Relizane

Due to extensive investment, the motorway network in Algeria is expanding, along with other kinds of infrastructure. The country plans to link all of its major ports and cities with its highway network, as well as linking the country to all of its neighbors, with the aim of boosting economic activity and trade.

Currently Algeria has over 96,000 km (60,000 mi) of paved roads including 2,318 km (1,440 mi) of expressways (six-lane highways), as well as 29,000 km (18,000 mi) of unpaved roads, for a total road system of about 127,000 km (79,000 mi).

=== Regional highways ===
Algeria has two major roads in the Trans-African Highway network, including the Trans-Sahara Highway, which traverses the country from north to south, and eventually continues into Niger and Nigeria, linking Algiers to Lagos, Nigeria. The country has also constructed the East–west highway, which crosses the entirety of the country's north along the east–west axis, and runs from its border with Tunisia to that with Morocco, connecting most major Algerian cities in the process.

=== Motorways ===
- East-West Highway is the most important road infrastructure in the country. It is a six-lane expressway that extends all the way from Aïn El Assel, on the border with Tunisia, to Maghnia, on the border with Morocco, over the length of 1,216 km. The highway links several major cities of the country along its way, namely Constantine, Sétif, Algiers, Blida, Chlef, Sidi Bel Abbès and Tlemcen, with additional secondary expressways constructed to link to other major cities, such as Oran, Béjaïa, Tizi Ouzou, Jijel, Skikda, Mostaghanem and Batna.
- Highway of the Hauts Plateaux is a planned highway of 1020 km that runs in parallel to the East–West Highway through the steppe-like region of the Hautes Plaines. The highway extends from the province of Tlemcen on the border with Morocco, through Saïda, Tiaret, Medea, M'sila, Batna, Oum El Bouaghi, Khenchela and finally ending at Tébessa on the border with Tunisia. Construction has begun on some sections of the highway.
- National Highway 4 extends from Oran to Boufarik, total length: 384 km. It is a motorway extending from Oran to Zaghloul (Zahana), length: 35 km.
- National Highway 5 is a motorway on its extent from Dar El Beïda to Ammal. Length: 82 km.
- National Highway 11 is a motorway running from Alger to Cherchell. Length: 65 km.
- National Highway 12 is a motorway running from Si Mustapha to Tizi Ouzou. Length: 57 km.

== Cable transport ==
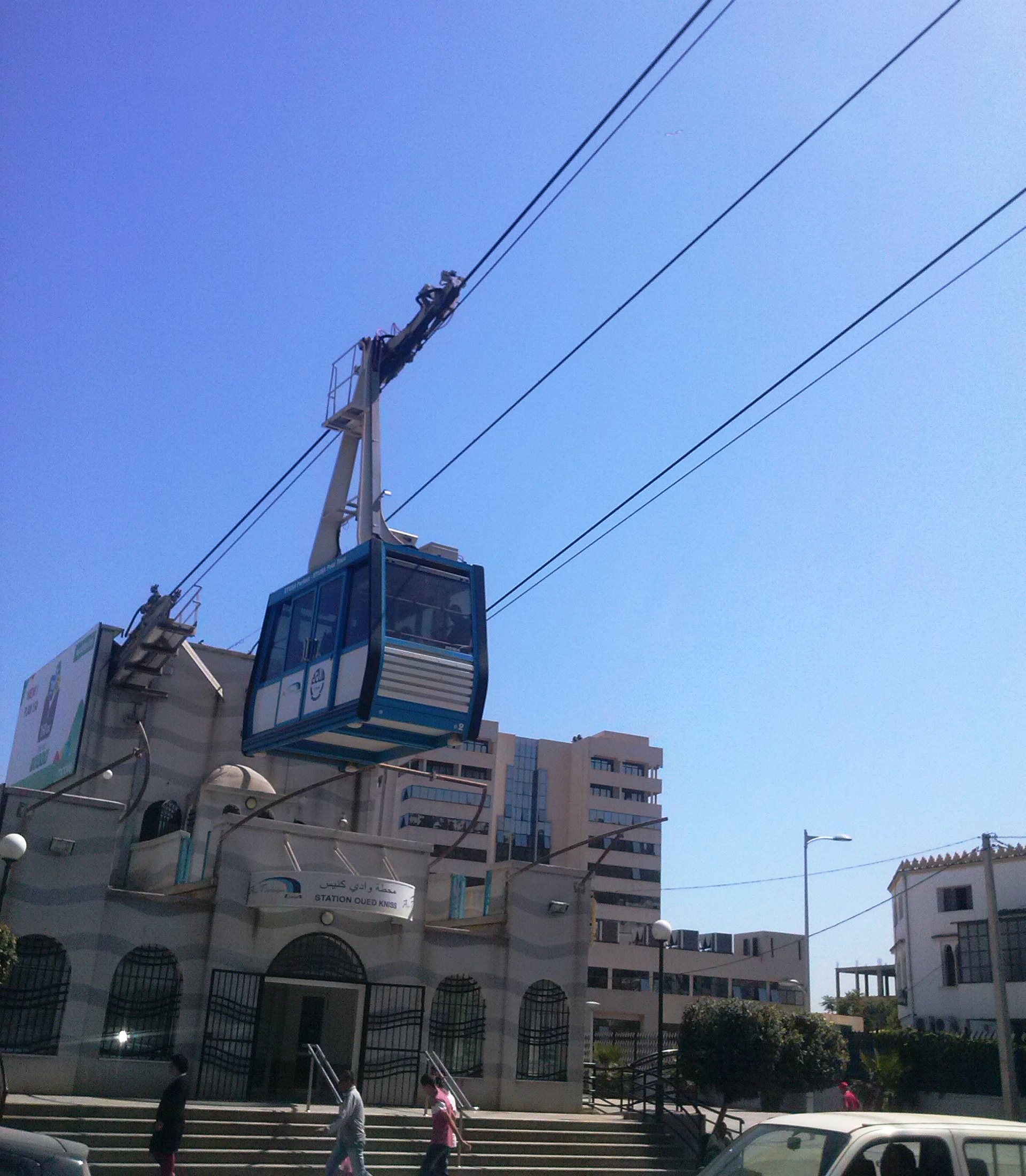
Aerial tramway in Algiers

Due to its mountainous geography, Algeria has taken a particular interest in cable-based transportation, namely gondola lifts and aerial tramways, which serve as both an ecological and touristic means of transport. Currently there are eight such systems in operation across the country, in Algiers, Oran, Tlemcen, Tizi Ouzou, Chréa, Constantine, Annaba and Skikda.

Over the coming years, Algeria will launch a program of new projects for the modernization and maintenance of all the country's cable cars. These works aim to reinforce the country's public cable transport.

== Pipelines ==
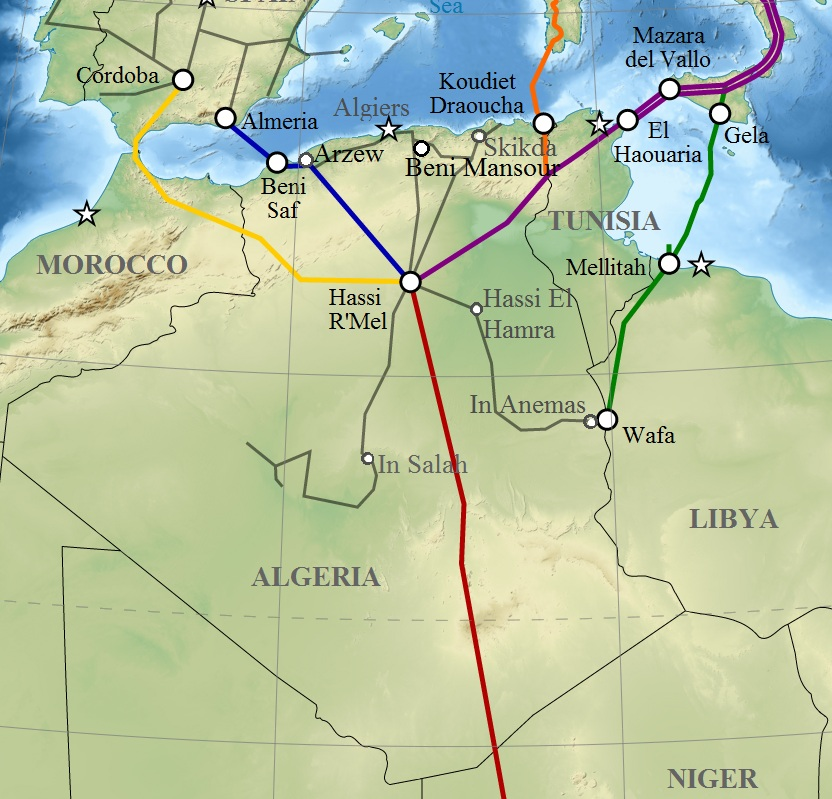
Map of pipelines in Algeria

As of 2013 Algeria had an extensive network of pipelines, with 7,036 kilometers of oil pipelines, 16,415 kilometers of natural gas pipelines, 3,447 kilometers of liquid petroleum gas pipelines, 2,600 kilometers of condensate pipelines and 144 kilometers of refined products pipelines.

The country has 3 export pipelines, two running to Spain (Maghreb-Europe Gas Pipeline and Medgaz), and one running to Italy (Trans-Mediterranean Pipeline), with an additional pipeline (GALSI) planned between Annaba and Sardinia. The pipeline networks will be extended to France and Germany.

== Ports and harbors ==
=== Mediterranean Sea ===
- Algiers, Annaba, Arzew, Béjaïa, Béni Saf, Dellys, Djendjen, Ghazaouet, Jijel, Mostaganem, Oran, Skikda, and Ténès

== Merchant marine ==
Total: 110 (2017, CIA World Factbook) by type: bulk carrier 3, general cargo 13, oil tanker 9, other 85 (2017)
