= EGSA Oran =

Algerian construction company

- Company type: Public (Public Establishment)
- Industry: Construction
- Founded: 11 August 1987; 38 years ago
- Headquarters: J9CV+3GX, Es Sénia, Algeria
- Area served: Worldwide
- Key people: Abdelkader Kessal (Chairman)
- Services: Infrastructure and property construction, transport infrastructure concessions (airports)
- Website: lesaeroportsdoran.dz

EGSA Oran (Arabic: مؤسسة تسيير مصالح مطارات الجزائر بوهران, English: Airport Management Services Establishment of Algeria of Oran is an Algerian concessions and construction company founded in 1987. Its head office is in Es Sénia, in the southern suburbs of Oran.

== History ==
EGSA Oran was created by decree N° 87-174 of 11 August 1987. It was transformed in its legal nature into a public establishment of an industrial and commercial nature by executive decree N° 91-150 of 18 May 1991. the establishment is endowed with the mission of public services and under the supervision of the Ministry of Public Works and Transport. In 2013 the company undertook the construction of the Ahmed Ben Bella Airport expansion works.

== Airports ==
EGSA Oran operates the following airports:

1. Oran – Ahmed Ben Bella Airport
2. Tlemcen – Zenata - Messali El Hadj Airport
3. Tiaret – Abdelhafid Boussouf Bou Chekif Airport
4. Mécheria – Cheikh Bouamama Airport
5. Béchar – Boudghene Ben Ali Lotfi Airport
6. Mascara – Ghriss Airport
7. Adrar – Touat-Cheikh Sidi Mohamed Belkebir Airport
8. Tindouf – Commandant Ferradj Airport
9. El Bayadh – Kssal Airport
10. Timimoun – Gourara Timimoun Airport
11. Bordj Badji Mokhtar – Bordj Badji Mokhtar Airport

== See also ==
- List of airports in Algeria
