= Houari Boumediene Airport =

International airport in Algeria

Houari Boumediene International Airport مطار هواري بومدين الدولي (Arabic) Aéroport d'Alger - Houari-Boumédiène (French)
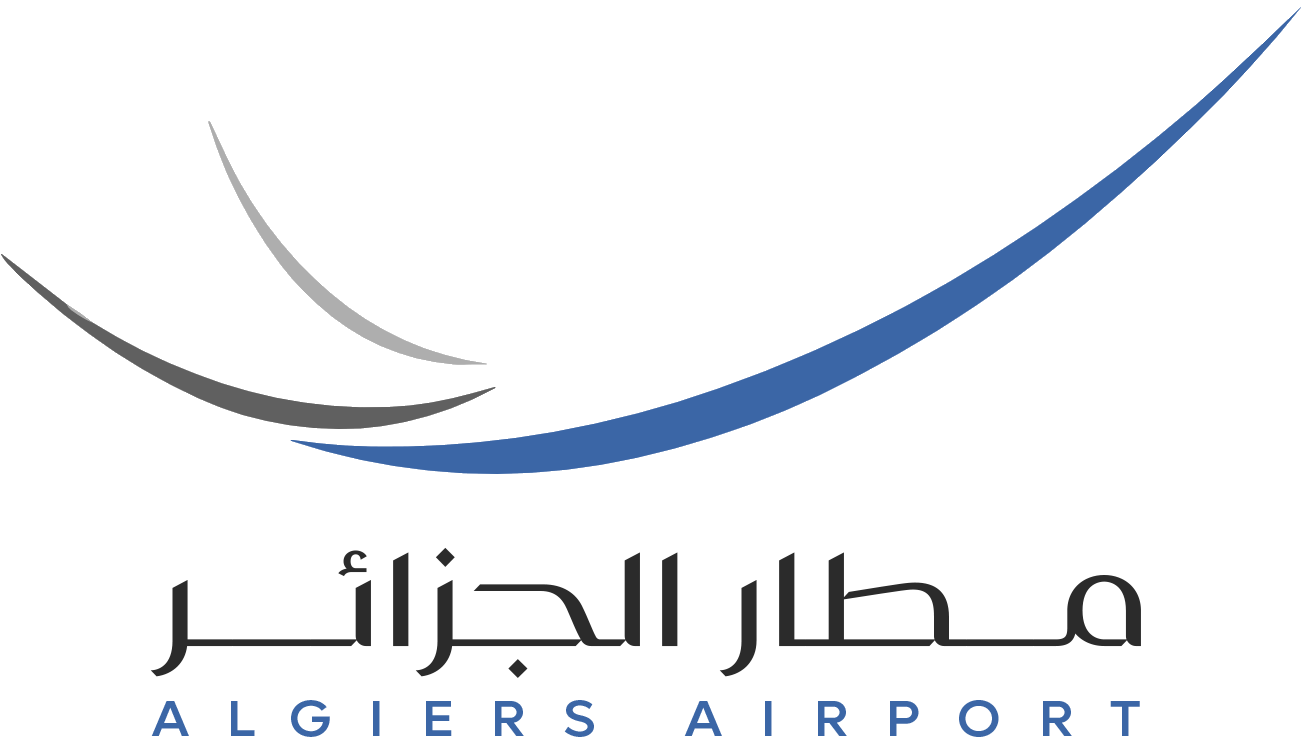

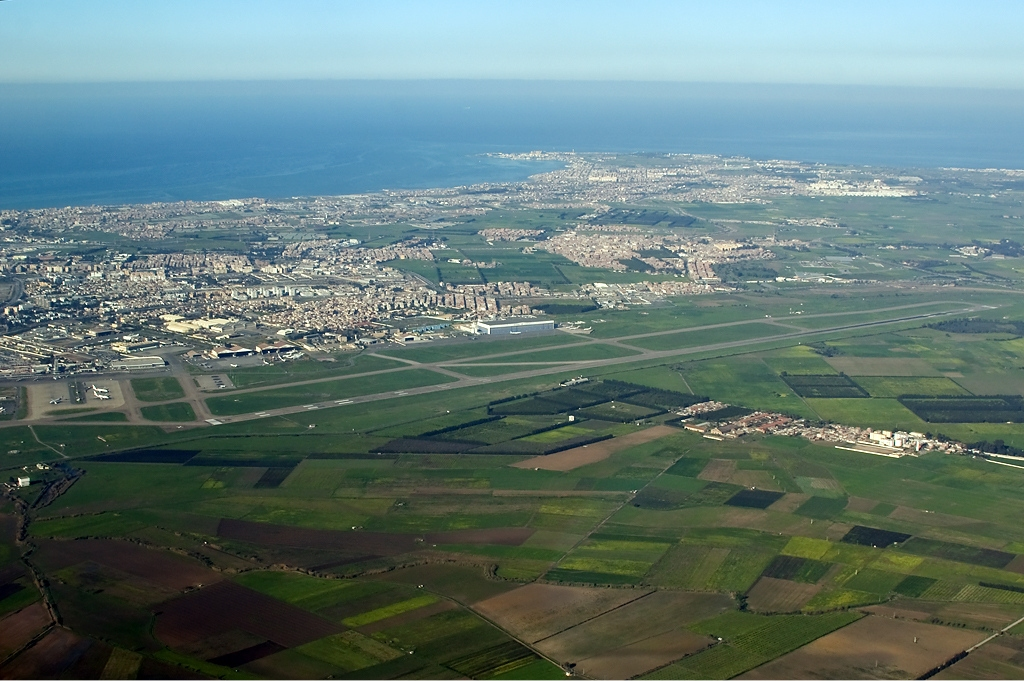
- Aerial view of the airport
- IATA: ALG; ICAO: DAAG

Summary
- Airport type: Public
- Operator: EGSA Alger
- Serves: Algiers
- Location: Dar El Beida, Algiers Province
- Opened: 1924; 102 years ago
- Hub for: Air Algérie; Domestic Airlines
- Time zone: CET (UTC+1)
- Elevation AMSL: 25 m (82 ft)
- Coordinates: 36°41′27.65″N 003°12′55.47″E
- Website: www.aeroportalger.dz

Map
- Location of airport in Algeria

Runways
Direction	Length		Surface
Direction	m	ft	Surface
05/23	3,500	11,482	Asphalt
09/27	3,500	11,482	Asphalt

Helipads
Number	Length		Surface
Number	m	ft	Surface
H1	72×26	240×85	Bitumen

Statistics (2024)
- Passengers: 9,151,517
- Cargo (Tkm): 24.8 million
- Aircraft movements (2016): 155,661
- Sources: France Aviation Civile Services, AIP, EGSA Alger, ACI's 2013 World Airport Traffic Report.

Houari Boumediene International Airport (Arabic: مطار هواري بومدين الدولي, romanized: Maṭār Hawwārī Būmadyan al-Duwaliyy) (IATA: ALG, ICAO: DAAG), also known as Algiers Airport or Algiers International Airport, is the main international airport serving Algiers, the capital of Algeria. It is located 9.1 NM (16.9 km; 10.5 mi) east southeast of the city.

The airport is named after Houari Boumediene (1932–1978), a former president of Algeria. Dar El Beïda, the area where the airport is located, was known as Maison Blanche ('White House'), and the airport is called Maison Blanche Airport in much of the literature about the Algerian War of Independence. The SGSIA (French: Société de Gestion des Services et Infrastructures Aéroportuaires), more commonly known as 'Airport of Algiers', is a public company established on 1 November 2006 to manage and operate the airport. The SGSIA has 2,100 employees.

== History ==
The airport was created in 1924 and named Maison Blanche Airport.

Hawker Hurricane Aircraft of No. 43 Squadron RAF, under the Command of Squadron Leader Michael Rook, landed at Maison Blanche shortly after 11.00 Hrs on 8 November, and began offensive patrols the next day. 43 Sqn remained at Maison Blanche until 13 March 1943, when the unit was deployed to Jemmapes, Constantine.

Once in Allied hands, the airport was used by the United States Army Air Forces Air Transport Command as a major transshipment hub for cargo, transiting aircraft and personnel. It functioned as a stopover en route to Tafarquay Airport, near Oran, or to Tunis Airport, Tunisia, on the North African Cairo-Dakar transport route. It also flew personnel and cargo to Marseille, Milan, Naples and Palermo. In addition, Twelfth Air Force A3 SECTION, under the command of Lt. Col Carter E. Duncan 1943/44, used the airport as a command and control facility, headquartering its XII Bomber Command; XXII Tactical Air Command, and the 51st Troop Carrier Wing to direct combat and support missions during the North African Campaign against the German Afrika Korps.

== Terminals ==
=== Terminal 1 ===
Terminal 1 is the original international terminal at Algiers Airport, it is divided into 2 halls and has a capacity of 6 million passengers per year. While older than Terminal 4, it remains an important facility for both international and domestic flights.

After the opening of Terminal 2, Hall 1 has been reserved for domestic passengers and Hall 2 is dedicated to the Middle East, and Gulf airlines.

=== Terminal 2 ===
The charter terminal (Terminal 2), renovated in 2007, has a capacity of 2.5 million passengers per year. It offers conditions of comfort and security comparable to those of Terminal 1. Its domestic traffic is 1.5 million passengers per year. Terminal 2 is equipped with 20 check-in desks with a cafeteria, tearoom and prayer room. There are 900 car parking spaces, a taxi stand, a boarding area of 5,000 m^{2}, with 7 gates, a luggage delivery area, and lounges for premium passengers.

Prior to Terminal 2's opening, Terminal 3 was used for operating domestic flights. In 2007, the terminal's use changed to pilgrimage and charter flights; but since 2019 all of the charters and pilgrimage flights have been moved to terminal 2 and the former Terminal 3 will be demolished in order to build a new terminal.

=== Terminal 4 ===
Terminal 4 opened on 29 April 2019. Its operations began in three different stages. The first was granted to flights bound for Paris by Air Algérie. A week later, all flights to France operated by Air Algérie were transferred to the terminal. The following week, all other international flights operated by Air Algérie were transferred to the new terminal. As of 15 May, the other foreign airlines also began operations in this terminal. Terminal 4 has 120 check-in points, 84 check-in counters, nine conveyor belts and 21 telescopic gateways. With a surface area of 73 hectares which currently accommodates an additional 10 million passengers per year and is also capable of accommodating Airbus A380 type aircraft.

== Airlines and destinations ==
=== Passenger ===
The following airlines operate regular scheduled and charter flights at Algiers Airport:

Airlines	Destinations
Air Algérie	Abidjan, Abuja, Addis Ababa, Adrar, Alicante, Amman–Queen Alia, Annaba, Athens (begins 24 December 2026), Bamako, Barcelona, Basel/Mulhouse, Batna, Bechar, Beijing–Capital, Beirut, Bejaia, Berlin, Biskra, Bordeaux, Bordj Badji Mokhtar, Brussels, Budapest, Cairo, Conakry, Constantine, Dakar–Diass, Djanet, Doha, Douala, Dubai–International (resumes 30 March 2027), El Bayadh, El Golea, El Oued, Frankfurt, Geneva, Ghardaia, Guangzhou, Hassi Messaound, Illizi, In Salah, Istanbul, Jeddah, Jijel, Johannesburg–O. R. Tambo, Kuala Lumpur–International, Laghouat, Libreville, Lille, Lisbon, London–Heathrow, London–Stansted, Luanda–Agostinho Neto, Lyon, Madrid, Marseille, Mécheria, Medina, Metz/Nancy, Milan–Malpensa, Montpellier, Montréal–Trudeau, Moscow–Sheremetyevo, N'Djamena, Nantes, Niamey, Nice, Nouakchott, Oran, Ouagadougou, Ouargla, Palma de Mallorca, Paris–Charles de Gaulle, Paris–Orly, Porto, Rome–Fiumicino, Rotterdam/The Hague, Setif, Shanghai–Pudong, Strasbourg, Tébessa, Tiaret, Timimoun, Tindouf, Tlemcen, Touggourt, Toulouse, Tripoli–Mitiga, Tunis, Vienna; Seasonal: Antalya, Manchester; Seasonal charter: Hurghada, Sharm El Sheikh
Air France	Paris–Charles de Gaulle
AJet	Istanbul–Sabiha Gökçen
ASL Airlines France	Paris–Orly; Seasonal: Basel/Mulhouse, Clermont-Ferrand, Lille, Lyon, Toulon
British Airways	London–Gatwick
Domestic Airlines	Addrar, Annaba, Bechar, Constantine, El Golea, Djanet, El Oued, In Salah, Oran, Tamanrasset, Tiaret, Timimoun
Egyptair	Cairo, Sharm El Sheikh
Emirates	Dubai–International (ends 3 February 2027)
Flynas	Jeddah
Iberia	Madrid
ITA Airways	Rome–Fiumicino
Lufthansa	Frankfurt
Nouvelair	Tunis
Pegasus Airlines	Istanbul–Sabiha Gökçen
Qatar Airways	Doha
Royal Jordanian	Amman–Queen Alia
Saudia	Jeddah
Transavia	Lyon, Marseille, Nantes, Paris Orly, Toulouse
TUI fly Belgium	Brussels
Tunisair	Tunis
Turkish Airlines	Istanbul
Volotea	Bordeaux, Marseille, Valencia (begins 28 November 2026)
Vueling	Alicante, Barcelona

=== Cargo ===
Airlines	Destinations
Lufthansa Cargo	Frankfurt
Swiftair	Marseille
Turkish Cargo	Istanbul

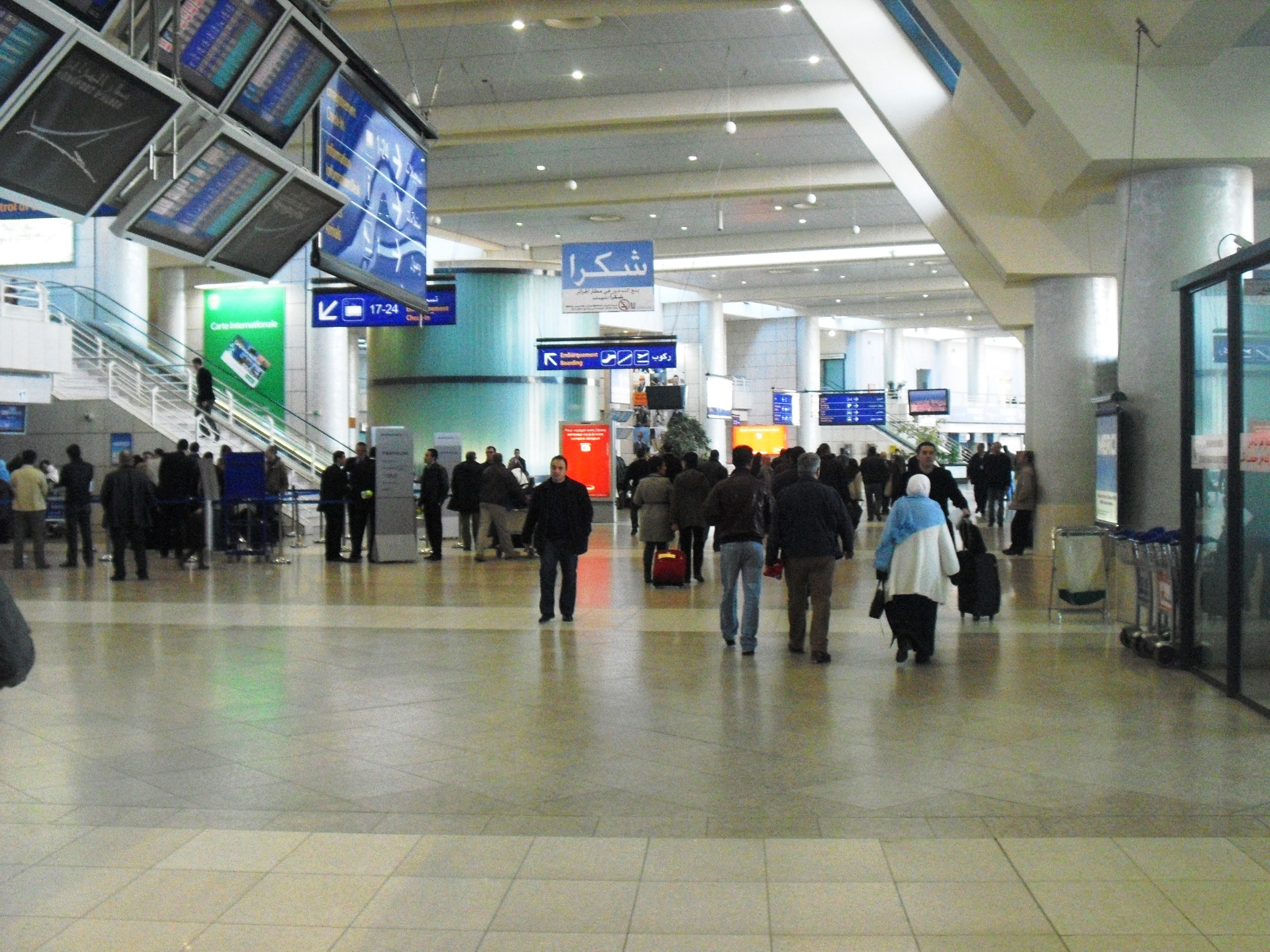
Old Terminal 1 (2006-2018)

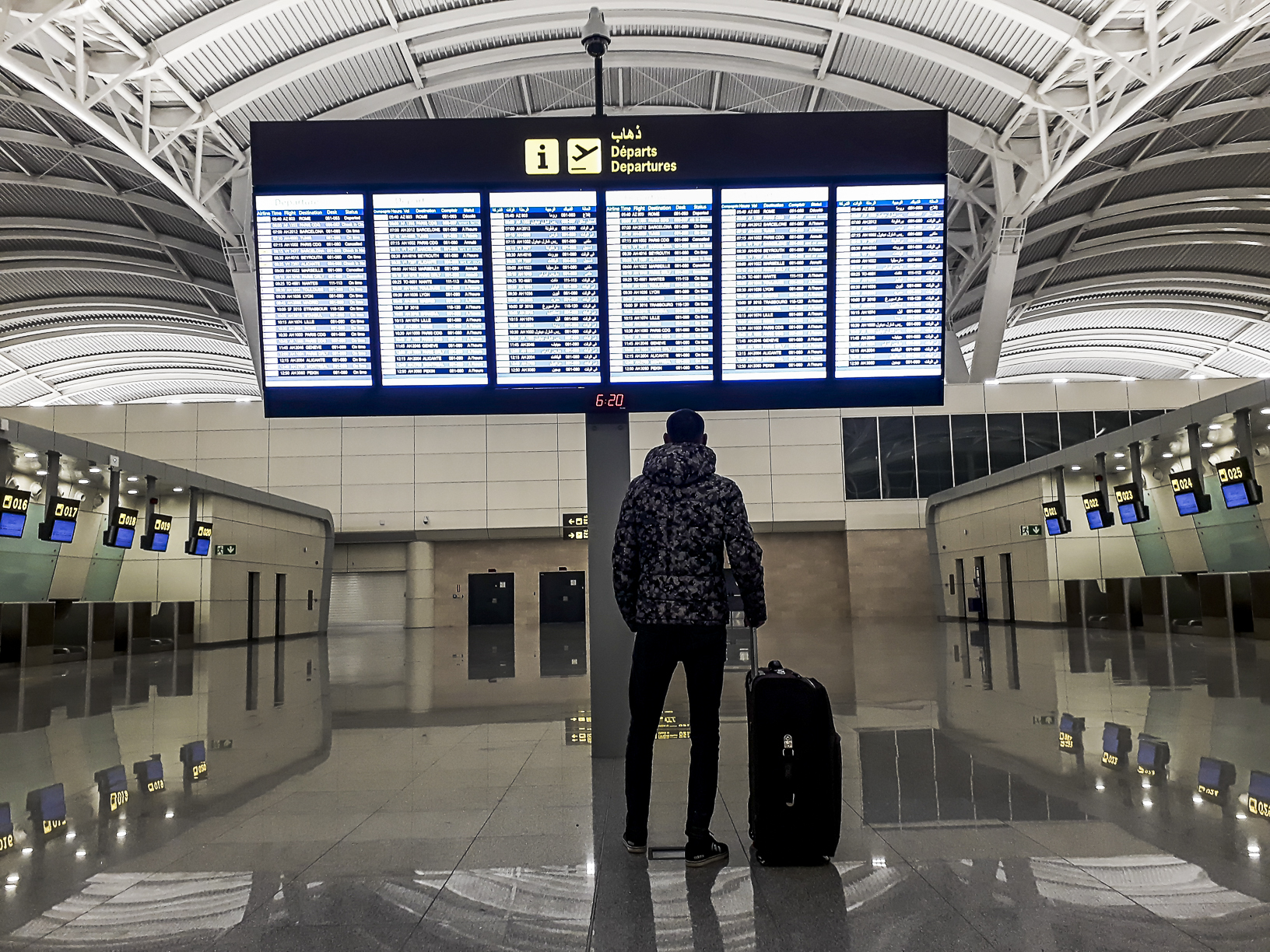
Departure board

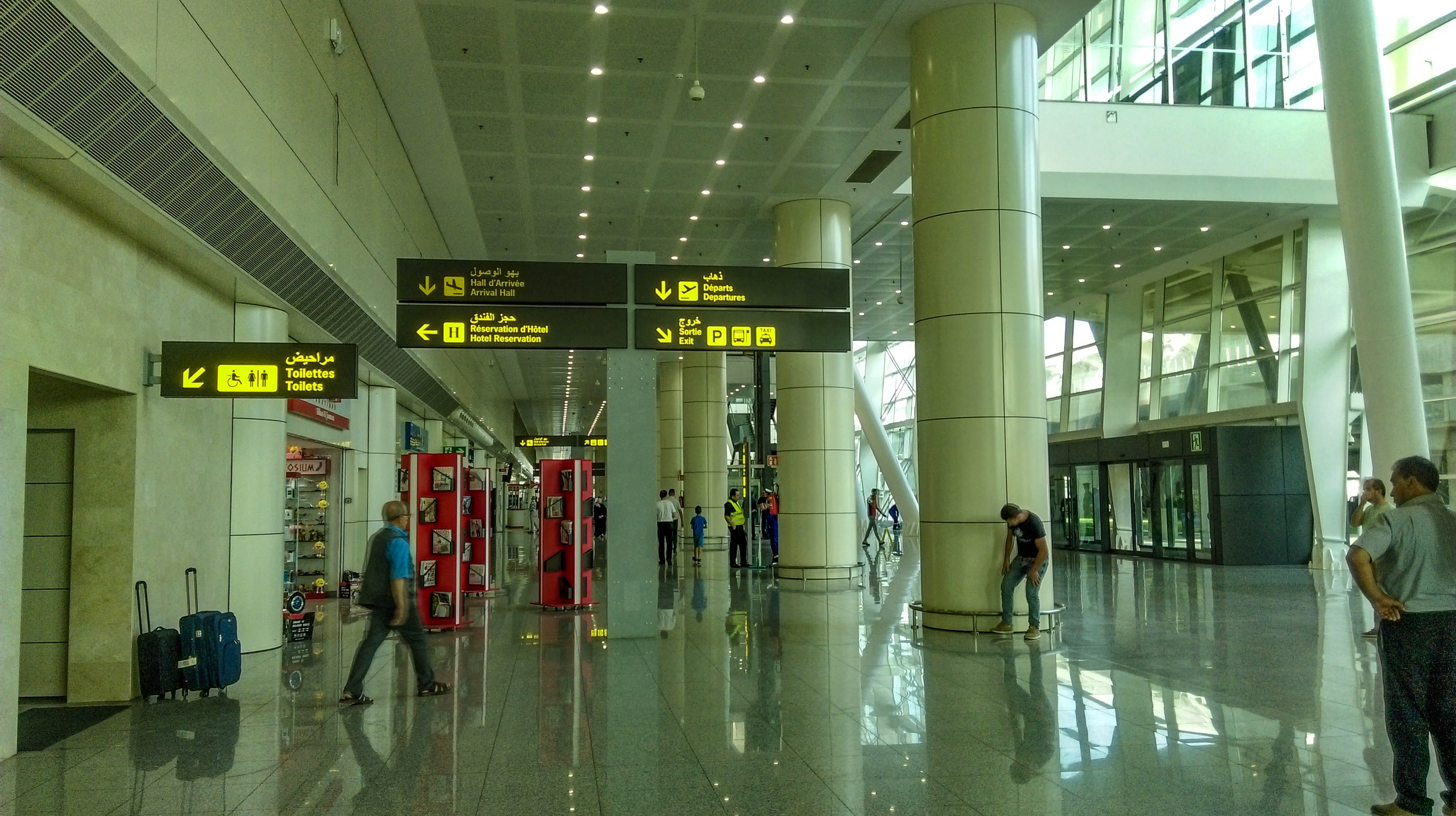
Arrivals

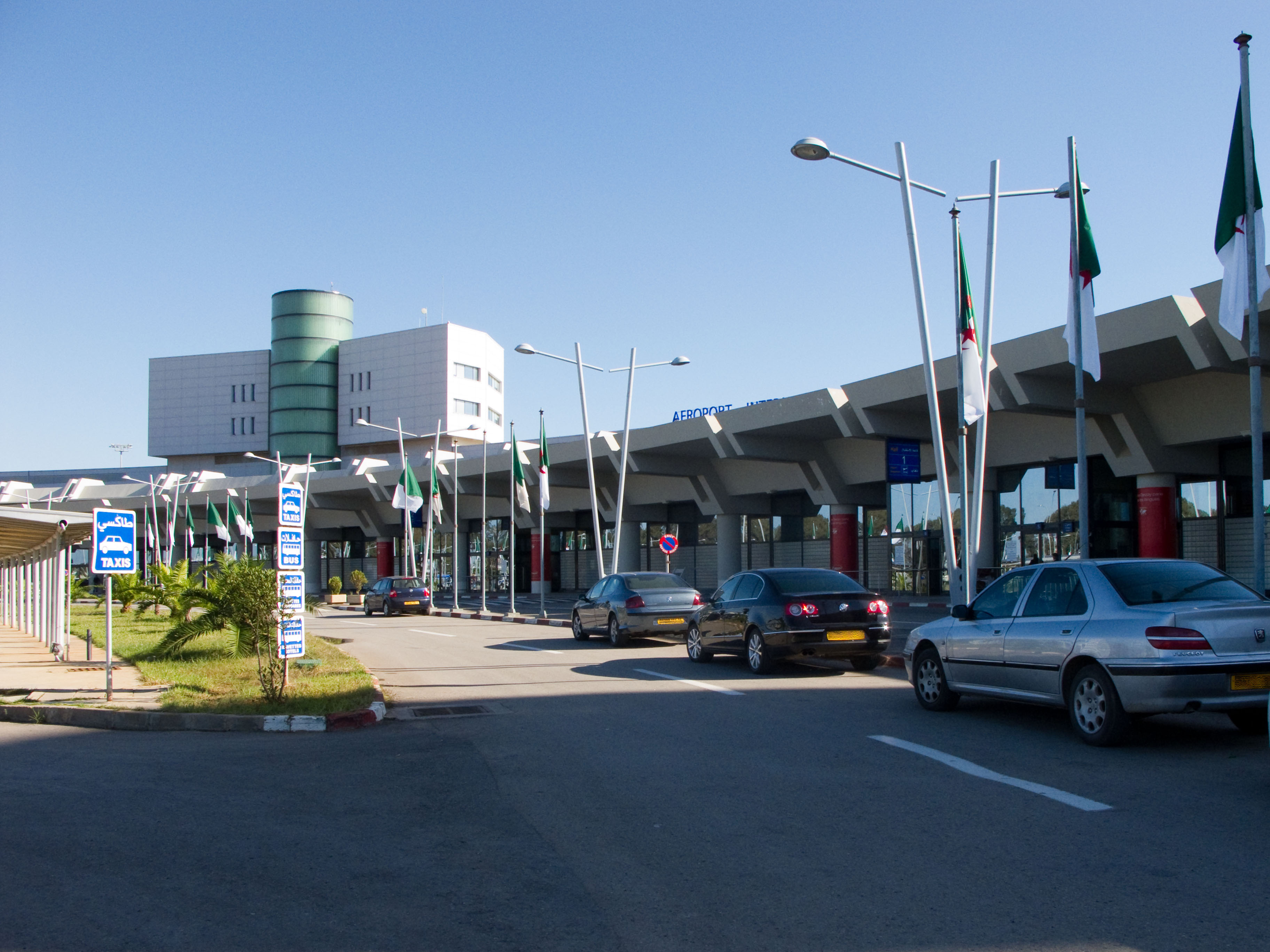
New Terminal 1

== Hotel park ==
The new Hyatt Regency Hotel opened its doors on 24 April 2019, and is located across the street from the Terminal 4 with which it is connected. It is the first hotel of the Hyatt Hotels Corporation chain in Algeria. The hotel has 320 rooms and 3 restaurants, a swimming pool and a 2,200 m^{2} lobby, and 13 meeting rooms.

== Accidents and incidents ==
- On 23 July 1968, three members of the Popular Front for the Liberation of Palestine hijacked El Al Flight 426, a Boeing 707 that transports 48 passengers, included the hijackers, from Italy to Israel, and diverted it to the airport. They eventually released all 48 hostages unharmed.
- On 21 November 2023, an Air Algerie Cargo Boeing 737-800 freighter aircraft, registration 7T-VJJ, performing flight 1208 to Paris Charles de Gaulle airport, auto-rotated and struck its tail onto runway 05's surface, causing holes to open on the aircraft's fuselage's underbelly, with the flight's crew cancelling the take-off and returning to the apron. The captain and first officer, the aircraft's sole occupants, survived without any injuries. One of the pallets had been placed in the wrong compartment, a short investigation found out soon after.

== See also ==
- Houari Boumediene Airport railway station
