= French hijacking of the FLN plane =

Hijacking of a plane during the Algerian War

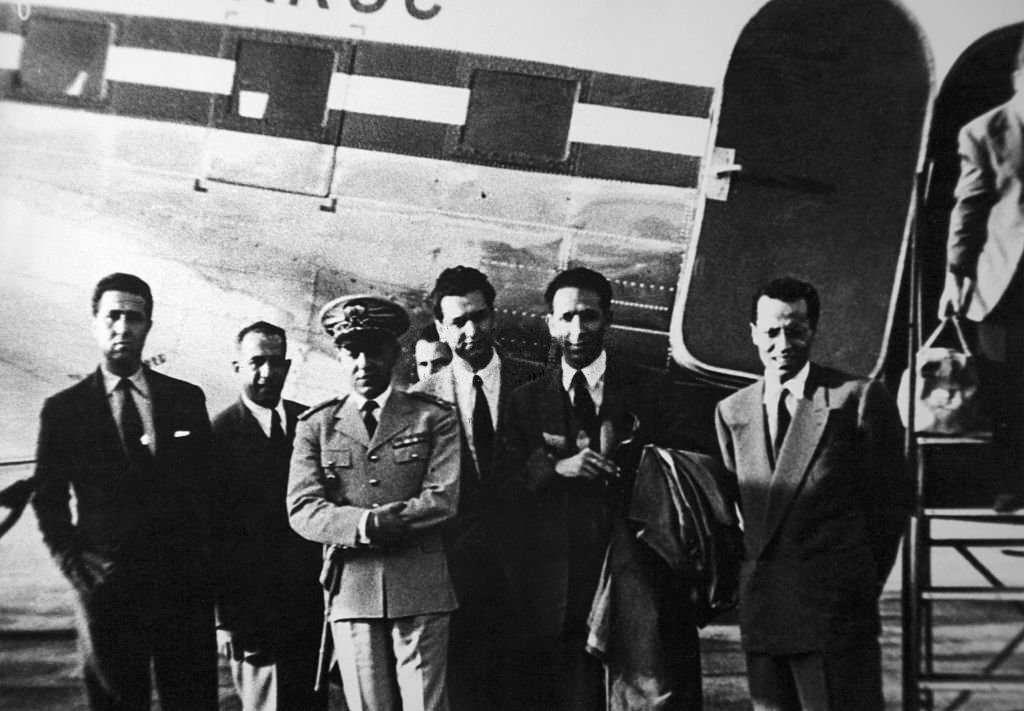
- On 22 October 1956 moments before taking off, from left to right : Ahmed Ben Bella, Mohamed Khider, Moroccan prince Hassan II, Hocine Aït Ahmed, Mohamed Boudiaf and Mostefa Lacheraf

Hijacking
- Date: 22 October 1956
- Summary: Hijacking by the French Armed Forces; flight redirected from Tunis to Algiers
- Site: Mediterranean Sea
- Total fatalities: 0

Aircraft
- Aircraft type: Douglas DC-3
- Operator: Royal Air Maroc
- Flight origin: Rabat, Morocco
- Destination: Tunis, Tunisia

On 22 October 1956, French forces hijacked a Moroccan civilian aircraft carrying leaders of the Algerian National Liberation Front (FLN) during the ongoing Algerian War. The Douglas DC-3 belonging to Royal Air Maroc was carrying Ahmed Ben Bella, Hocine Aït Ahmed, Mohamed Boudiaf, Mostefa Lacheraf, and Mohamed Khider. It was destined to leave from Palma de Mallorca for Tunis where the FLN leaders were to conference with Prime Minister Habib Bourguiba, but French forces intercepted the civilian aircraft over the Mediterranean Sea and redirected the flight to occupied Algiers, where the FLN leaders were arrested, derailing the planned conference in Tunis. It is considered one of the most important events in the Algerian War.

== Context ==
The French protectorate over Morocco had ended months before, and King Mohammed V supported the FLN in the struggle for Algerian independence.

== Details ==
On 21 October 1956, King Mohammed V of Morocco received a delegation of leaders of the Algerian National Liberation Front—Ahmed Ben Bella, Hocine Aït Ahmed, Mohamed Boudiaf, Mostefa Lacheraf, and Mohamed Khider—in Rabat. France disapproved of the meeting and Alain Savary, French Secretary of State for Tunisian and Moroccan Affairs under Guy Mollet, announced the suspension of aid to Morocco.

22 October at midday, with fake documents, the FLN delegation left Rabat for Tunis by way of Palma de Mallorca, Spain in order to avoid flying over Algeria to circumvent France. The Douglas DC-3, registered F-OABV, belonged to Morocco's national airline Royal Air Maroc. After departing Palma, French forces over the Mediterranean redirected the Moroccan aircraft, ordering the French pilot to land it in Algiers where the FLN delegation was arrested.

Max Lejeune, Secretary of State for the Armed Forces, and Henri Lorillot and other French generals in Algiers were responsible for the operation, without interference from Robert Lacoste, French resident minister and governor general of Algiers at the time.

The hijacking and arrest of the FLN leadership derailed the planned conference in Tunis, to have been attended by the FLN delegation as well as Habib Bourguiba and Mohammed V, with the goal of establishing a North African Federation to promote the independence of Algeria and end the French-Algerian war.

== Aftermath ==
King Mohammed V of Morocco was distraught and "feared for his own life."

Anti-French riots broke out targeting French people in and around Meknes, with dozens of casualties.

== Legacy ==
Maati Monjib mentioned historians discussing the event as the first instance of a passenger aircraft hijacking in history, but it is not the case.

== Diplomatic consequences ==
With the leaders of the FLN (National Liberation Front), authorities seized documents providing formal evidence of Egyptian support for the FLN. However, the revelation of this support did not calm tensions; rather, it intensified them. In Morocco, violent anti-French riots resulted in around sixty deaths, with all victims being Europeans who were brutally massacred. Meanwhile, the Sultan adopted a firmer stance by recalling his ambassador from Paris. Habib Bourguiba took a similar position, and France faced severe criticism across the Arab world. Leftist French media reacted with extreme hostility, leading to the resignation of Alain Savary, Secretary of State for Moroccan and Tunisian Affairs, along with his chief of staff, Claude Cheysson. Pierre de Leusse, France's ambassador to Tunisia, also resigned from his post.

For the FLN, the capture of Ben Bella and his companions was not considered an irreparable loss, as these five men were politicians who could be easily replaced. Ben Bella famously stated at the time of his arrest: "This will change nothing!" Within forty-eight hours, the FLN distributed a leaflet in Algiers stating: "Five of our leaders have been arrested, but the machine remains in place." Conversely, the severing of relations with France was a significant blow to both parties. Although the FLN was now assured powerful support from Egypt, Tunisia, and Morocco, it lost direct dialogue with France. On his part, Guy Mollet was furious; the operation occurred without his knowledge, and secret negotiations that had been initiated in Rome with the FLN were abruptly terminated. France was left facing a choice between total military victory or a complete abandonment of Algeria.
