= Ain Beida Airport =

Ain Beida Airport Aéroport de Ouargla / Ain Beida
- IATA: OGX; ICAO: DAUU

Summary
- Airport type: Public / Military
- Operator: EGSA Alger
- Serves: Ouargla
- Location: Ouargla, Algeria
- Elevation AMSL: 152 m / 499 ft
- Coordinates: 31°55′53″N 05°24′24″E

Map
- Location of airport in Algeria

Runways
Direction	Length		Surface
Direction	m	ft	Surface
02/20	3,000	9,843	Asphalt
18/36	3,000	9,843	Asphalt
- Sources: AIP, EGSA Alger, DAFIF

Ain Beida Airport (French: Aéroport de Ouargla / Ain Beida) (IATA: OGX, ICAO: DAUU), also known as Ouargla Airport, is an airport serving Ouargla, a city in the Ouargla Province of eastern Algeria. It is located 4.3 nautical miles (8 km) southeast of the city. The airport is in the Sahara Desert, about 540 km southeast of Algiers.

The Ouargla (OUR) VOR-DME and Ouargla (OU) Non-directional beacon navigational aids are north of and aligned with the runways.

== Airlines and destinations ==
Airlines	Destinations
Air Algérie	Adrar, Algiers, Constantine, Djanet, El Golea, Illizi, In Amenas, Oran, Tamanrasset

== World War II ==
During World War II the airport was known as Sedrata Airfield, and was used by the United States Twelfth Air Force in the Western Desert Campaign in 1942–1943. Known units assigned to the airfield were:

- 17th Bombardment Group, 10 May-23 Jun 1943, Boeing B-17 Flying Fortress
- 319th Bombardment Group, 1-26 Jun 1943, Martin B-26 Marauder
