= VVZ =

VVZ may refer to:

- Veronika Velez-Zuzulová, a World Cup alpine ski racer from Slovakia.
- Takhamalt Airport, an airport serving Illizi, Algeria.
