= DAAP =

DAAP may refer to:

- Digital Audio Access Protocol, for sharing music in Apple's iTunes
- University of Cincinnati College of Design, Architecture, Art, and Planning, at the University of Cincinnati, United States
- ICAO airport code for Illizi Airport
