= Kabylie Conflict =

The Kabylie Conflict refers to one of the following:

- Mokrani Revolt
- Socialist Forces Front rebellion in Algeria
- Berber Spring
- Black Spring (Algeria)
