= DJG =

DJG may refer to:

- Duliajan railway station in India, station code
- Djanet Inedbirene Airport, Algeria, IATA code
