= Djanet Aerodrome =

Airport in Djanet, Algeria, 1930–1984

- IATA: ~~DJG~~; ICAO: none

Summary
- Airport type: Defunct
- Operator: Établissement national de la navigation aérienne
- Serves: Djanet
- Location: Djanet Province in southeast Algeria
- Opened: 1930
- Closed: 1984
- Coordinates: 24°26′36″N 9°30′38″E

Map
- Location in Algeria

Runways
Direction	Length		Surface
Direction	ft	m	Surface
12/30	8,530	2,600	Asphalt

Djanet Aerodrome ~~(IATA: DJG)~~ was a regional airport serving the oasis city of Djanet, Djanet Province in southeast Algeria. It was established in 1930 as a stop for long-distance pioneering flights, supporting the French colonial exploration of the Sahara. In 1962, a paved runway was built and it provided flight services for the city until closure in 1984, when it was replaced by Djanet Inedbirene Airport.

== History ==
In February 1929, three Breguet 14 aircraft were tasked with scouting the Sétif—Djanet route, which primarily consisted of poorly marked and rarely used tracks. The aircraft safely flew from Ouargla to Fort Lallemand, struggling to follow the tracks due to their condition. In May 1929, navigation beacons were installed by Lt. Desanges. After Djanet was reached, a landing ground was established around 1930. A large stone circle measuring 20 metres in diameter and stone corner fringes were installed, which provided a visual navigation guide for pilots flying into the Djanet Airfield. The landing ground at Adrar Madet also contained similar construction. An isolated rock located at the access road of the airfield marked the southern limit of Djanet and also the entrance to the airfield. An illustration of an elephant was carved into the rock. Located close by was a small stone outpost of Fort Chartlet, which controlled the southern access to Djanet and likely also guarded the airfield. In the 1930s, Djanet Airfield was used as an emergency landing ground between long-distance pioneering flights by French colonial pilots. It was equipped with a 1,000 × 1,000 meter sand-packed landing ground and a fuel pump.

At the end of 1932, Marcel Germain and Volmerange flew over the Eastern Sahara in a long-distance pioneering flight for the first time, reaching Djanet Airfield after completing the journey. There was an air route between Djanet to Djado via In-Ezzane, crossing over rugged terrain without landing possibilities until passing In-Ezzane. There was a small white post in In-Ezzane, acting as a visual aid for pilots, and landing possibilities existed south of the post. However, the ground became rougher beyond that point, until beyond Djado where an emergency landing ground was marked.

=== Djanet Aerodrome ===
On 14 October 1956, Secretary of State for National Defence Max Lejeune arrived at Djanet Aerodrome in a Douglas DC-3, accompanied by General Henri Lorillot, to inspect the local military post in Djanet. He also met with tribal leaders as part of efforts to maintain control of remote southern Algeria during the Algerian War. In 1959, the 4th Saharan Engineer Company of the French Corps du Génie arrived, and began construction of a new paved runway. Early stages of construction involved the watering of the sand, which stabilised the surface for the installation of a runway. In June 1962, an inauguration ceremony of the newly built strip was held, and the airfield opened. Throughout operation, Djanet Aerodrome was used for military missions of the French Air Force and also joint civilian operations. In 1972, the aerodrome was included in an Air Algérie route, which flew services to Ghardaïa, Hassi Messaoud, In Amenas, and Tamanrasset.

=== Closure ===
By the 1970s and 1980s, a substantial increase in tourism rendered the aerodrome at max operating capacity, particularly due to its small size. In 1981, construction of a new airport located 18 kilometres south from the aerodrome began. Two new runways, one main measuring 3,000 metres in length and one secondary measuring 1,400 metres in length were built. In 1984, Djanet Aerodrome was closed after Djanet Inedbirene Airport was opened.

== Accidents & incidents ==
- On 2 May 1976, an Air Algérie Convair CV-640 registered 7T-VAH was destroyed and written off in an accident at Djanet Aerodrome. No further details of the accident are known.

== See also ==
- French colonial aviation in Africa
