= 1963 Algerian presidential election =

First Algerian presidential election

- 15 September 1963
- Registered: 6,581,340
- Turnout: 88.89%
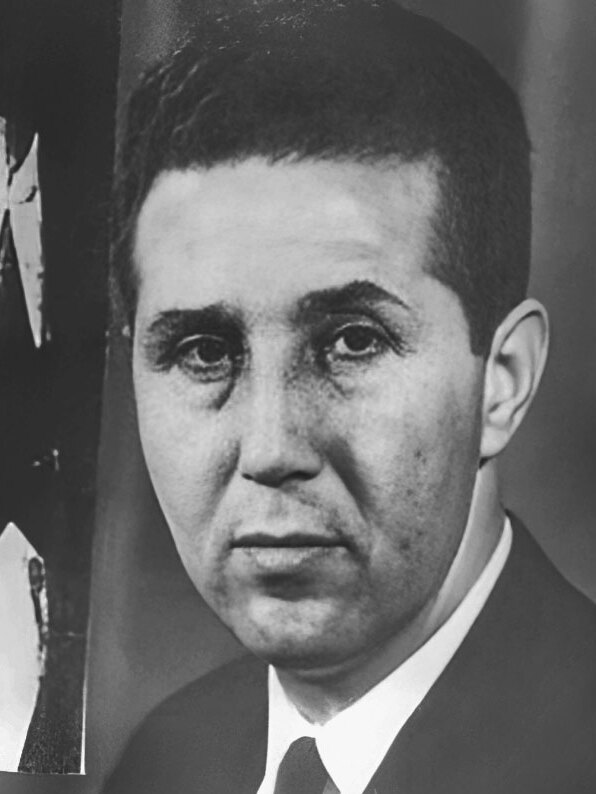
Candidate	Ahmed Ben Bella
Party	FLN
Popular vote	5,805,103
Percentage	99.61%
President before election
Ferhat Abbas (acting)
FLN
Elected President
Ahmed Ben Bella
FLN

Presidential elections were held for the first time in Algeria on 15 September 1963. Incumbent Ahmed Ben Bella of the National Liberation Front (the sole legal party) was the only candidate, and was re-elected with 99.61% of the vote, based on an 89% turnout.

== Results ==
Candidate	Party	Votes	%
Ahmed Ben Bella	National Liberation Front	5,805,103	99.61
Against		22,515	0.39
Total		5,827,618	100.00
Valid votes		5,827,618	99.62
Invalid/blank votes		22,515	0.38
Total votes		5,850,133	100.00
Registered voters/turnout		6,581,340	88.89
Source: Nohlen et al.
