= Colonial aviation in Northern Africa =

History of colonial aviation in Northern Africa

Colonial aviation in Northern Africa dates back to the 1910s, when France recognised the strategic importance of using aircraft to travel between remote outposts. Shortly thereafter, a number of landing grounds were established along already existing routes and near forts, which grew in number by the 1930s.

== History ==
Beginning in the 1910s, French aviation grew in popularity as it allows remote outposts and forts to be connected far more quickly than overland tracks. Subsequently, the colonial administration began aerial reconnaissance missions, followed by the establishment of landing grounds to support postal and aviation routes across the desert. Lieutenant Grandperrin of the Algerian Topographic Service was responsible for the reconnaissance and marking of sites for future landing grounds, while Lieutenant Fenouil and Warrant Officer Poivre prepared fuel supplies and spare parts for automobiles and aircraft at planned posts. By the late 1910s and early 1920s, it became necessary to construct routes along where airfields were to be established.

In the 1930s, a wave of long-distance pioneer flights driven the further establishment of emergency landing grounds across the Sahara, mainly along already existing overland tracks. These landing grounds were equipped with a fuel distributor, aviation oil at some sites, windsocks, and some even had hangars and weather posts. Navigational aids were typical, usually consisting of a stone circle measuring 20 to 50 meters in diameter and the name of a nearby landmark stencilled into the middle of the circle. Stone corners and side fringes were used to mark the boundary of the landing grounds. These structures were usually painted white to provide better visibility for pilots.

=== Post-use ===
Many of the landing grounds established by the colonial administration were abandoned by the 1950s as aviation needs shifted, particularly those that were remote. However, some were maintained by locals, which involved the repositioning of displaced stones. Today, many of the landing circles still remain in good condition, and can be seen from satellite imagery. These structures, specifically the one at Adrar Madet, have also been mistaken as pre-Islamic tombs by an Italian archeological magazine.

== Airfields ==
This is a partial list of French Landing Grounds established durng French West Africa (1895 — 1958).

=== Algeria ===
Landing grounds
Name	Type	Markings	Coordinates	Fate	Notes
Abalemma	Emergency landing ground				
Adrar	Emergency landing ground	Stone circle and boundary markers; stencilled "ADRAR" No longer visible in satellite imagery	27°52′47″N 0°16′53″W	Adrar Aerodrome	
Ain-Sefra	Emergency landing ground	Stone circle and boundary markers; stencilled "AÏN SEFRA" No longer visible in satellite imagery	32°46′10″N 0°33′10″W	Redeveloped	
Amguid	Emergency landing ground	Stone circle and boundary markers; stencilled "AMGUID" No longer visible in satellite imagery dated 2012	26°22′53″N 5°19′24″E	Amguid Regional Airport	
Aoulef	Landing ground				
Arak	Emergency landing ground	Stone circle and boundary markers; stencilled name absent No longer visible in satellite imagery dated 2023	25°16′09″N 3°43′28″E		
Béni-Abbes	Emergency landing ground	Stone circle and boundary markers; stencilled "BÉNI ABBES" No longer visible in satellite imagery dated 2024	30°07′36″N 2°08′34″W	Béni Abbès Airport	
Bidon-5	Emergency landing ground	No identifiable markers; intercepted by Gao—Reggan track	21°45′57″N 0°59′06″E		
Biskra	Emergency landing ground	Stone circle and boundary markers; stencilled "BISKRA" No longer visible in satellite imagery	34°48′09″N 5°44′01″E	Biskra Airport	
Colomb-Béchar	Air Force Aerodrome	Stone circle and boundary markers; stencilled name absent No longer visible in satellite imagery	31°35′43″N 2°14′27″W	Redeveloped	
Djanet	Emergency landing ground	Stone circle and boundary markers; stencilled name absent No longer visible in satellite imagery dated 2024	24°26′36″N 9°30′38″E	Djanet Aerodrome	
El-Ouig	Emergency landing ground				
El-Goléa	Emergency landing ground		30°34′15″N 2°52′05″E	El Golea Airport	
Fada	Intermediate landing ground				
Faya	Intermediate landing ground				
Flatters	Emergency landing ground	Stone circle and boundary markers; stencilled name absent Two corner fringes and a portion of the circle are visible in satellite imagery dated 2023	28°07′53″N 6°49′57″E	Fort Flatters Aerodrome	
Hassi-Bourahla	Emergency landing ground				
In-Guezzam	Emergency landing ground	Stone circle and boundary markers; stencilled name absent	19°33′44″N 5°45′14″E	In Guezzam Airport	
In-Salah	Emergency landing ground	Stone circle and boundary markers; stencilled "INSALAH"	27°11′46″N 2°28′43″E	Redeveloped	
Laghouat	Emergency landing ground	Stone circle; stencilled name absent	33°48′26″N 2°50′55″E	Redeveloped	
Ouargla	Emergency landing ground	Stone circle and boundary markers; stencilled "OUARGLA 120" No longer visible in earliest satellite imagery dated 2001	31°57′59″N 5°17′58″E	Redeveloped	
Reggan (Civilian)	Emergency landing ground	Stone circle and boundary markers No longer visible in earliest satellite imagery dated 2004	25°43′20″N 0°10′34″E	Redeveloped	
Reggan (Military)	Emergency landing ground	Stone circle and boundary markers; stencilled name absent This landing ground housed the Compagnie du Génie de l’Air. No longer visible in earliest satellite imagery dated 2004	26°42′44″N 0°10′32″E	Reggane Aerodrome; later replaced and closed	
Tabankort	Emergency landing ground				
Tamanrasset	Emergency landing ground	Stone circle and only corner markers; stencilled name absent	22°48′27″N 5°30′52″E	Redeveloped	
Tarhit	Emergency landing ground				
Timgad	Emergency landing ground	WWI airfield used to carry out operations against rebel groups in the mountains No longer visible in satellite imagery; exact location unclear	35°29′38″N 5°28′07″E		
Timimoun	Emergency landing ground	Stone circle and boundary markers; stencilled "TIMIMOUN" No longer visible in satellite imagery	29°14′43″N 0°15′21″E	Timimoun Airport	
Timimoun East	Emergency landing ground				
Touggourt	Emergency landing ground	Stone circle and boundary markers; stencilled "TOUGGOURT" No longer visible in satellite imagery	33°05′52″N 6°02′41″E	Redeveloped	
Zazir	Emergency landing ground				

=== Mali ===
Landing grounds
Name	Type	Markings	Coordinates	Fate	Notes
Timétrine	Emergency landing ground	Stone circle and corner markers; stencilled name absent Visible in satellite imagery dated 2010	19°27′17″N 0°25′19″W	Abandoned	

=== Mauritania ===
Landing grounds
Name	Type	Markings	Coordinates	Fate	Notes
Ain Ben Tili	Emergency landing ground				
Akjoujt	Intermediate landing ground				
Atar	Landing ground		20°30′09″N 13°02′50″W	Atar International Airport	
Bir Moghrein	Intermediate landing ground				
Bou Izakarn	Emergency landing ground				
Bou Zib	Emergency landing ground	Stone circle; stencilled "BOUZIB" Visible in satellite imagery dated 2024	18°21′10″N 8°08′39″W	Abandoned since 1950s	
Boutilimit	Emergency landing ground				
Idjil (Fort Gouraud)	Intermediate landing ground	Stone circle and boundary markers; stencilled "IDJIL"	22°40′27″N 12°43′39″W		
Foum el Hassne	Emergency landing ground				
Méderdra	Emergency landing ground				
Nouakchott	Emergency landing ground				
Oujaf	Emergency landing ground	Stone circle and boundary markers; stencilled "OUJAF" Visible in satellite imagery dated 2025	17°49′27″N 7°54′10″W	Abandoned	
Port Etienne	Landing ground				
Rosso	Emergency landing ground				
Tagouraret	Emergency landing ground	Stone circle and boundary markers; stencilled "TAGOURARET"	17°39′10″N 7°31′06″W	Abandoned	
Tindouf	Intermediate landing ground				
Tiznit	Emergency landing ground				

=== Niger ===
Landing grounds
Name	Type	Markings	Coordinates	Fate	Notes
Abécher	Intermediate landing ground				
Adrar Madet	Emergency landing ground	Stone circle and boundary markers; stencilled name absent Visible in satellite imagery dated 2024	18°44′31″N 10°21′51″E	Abandoned	
Agadem	Emergency landing ground	Stone circle; stencilled "AGADEM" Visible in satellite imagery	16°49′26″N 13°17′29″E	Abandoned	
Agadès	Emergency landing ground				
Aney	Emergency landing ground	Stone circle and boundary markers; stencilled name is unintelligible Visible in satellite imagery dated 2024	19°23′45″N 12°51′01″E		
Chirfa	Emergency landing ground	Stone circle and boundary markers; stencilled "CHIRFA" Visible in satellite imagery dated 2024	20°56′49″N 12°19′00″E	Abandoned	
Dirkou	Emergency landing ground	Stone circle and boundary markers; stencilled "DIRKOU" Visible in satellite imagery dated 2025	18°59′25″N 12°52′13″E	Abandoned	
Fachi	Emergency landing ground	Stone circle and boundary markers; stencilled "FACHI" Visible in satellite imagery dated 2022 in good condition	18°06′00″N 11°34′11″E	Abandoned	
Zinder	Emergency landing ground				

== See also ==
- List of North African airfields during World War II
