= Ahmed Ben Bella =

President of Algeria from 1963 to 1965

- أحمد بن بلّة
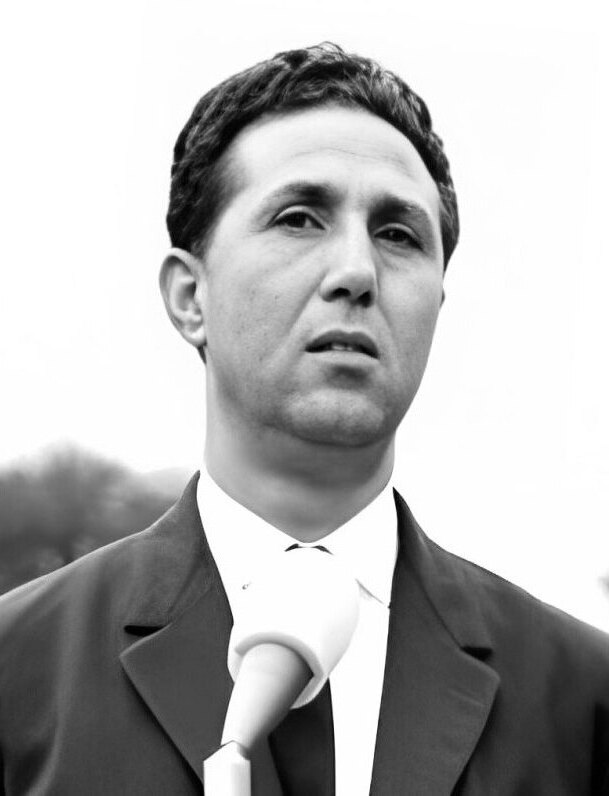
- Ben Bella in 1962

1st President of Algeria
- In office 15 September 1963 – 19 June 1965
- Vice President: Rabah Bitat; Houari Boumédiène; Saïd Mohammedi
- Succeeded by: Houari Boumédiène as Chairman of the Revolutionary Council

1st Prime Minister of Algeria
- In office 27 September 1962 – 15 September 1963
- Vice President: Rabah Bitat
- Preceded by: Benyoucef Benkhedda as Head of Government
- Succeeded by: Office abolished; Mohamed Ben Ahmed Abdelghani (1979)

Personal details
- Born: 1916 (Note: The exact date of birth is not known. Sources state that he was born in 1918; however, his father antedated his birth by two years. In a 2002 interview, Ben Bella specified that he was probably born in 1916, without absolute certainty on his part.) Maghnia, French Algeria
- Died: 11 April 2012 (aged 95–96) Algiers, Algeria
- Party: FLN (1954–1965)
- Other political affiliations: MTLD (1947–1954); OS (1947–1954); MDA (1982–1997)
- Spouse: Zohra Michelle Sellami (m. 1971; died 2008)
- Children: 2
- Occupation: Politician; footballer

Military service
- Allegiance: France
- Branch/service: French Liberation Army
- Years of service: 1936–1944
- Battles/wars: World War II; Italian campaign; Battle of Monte Cassino
- Awards: Médaille militaire
Association football career
- Positions: Centre back; midfielder
Senior career*
Years	Team	Apps	(Gls)
1939–1940	Marseille	1	(0)
- * Club domestic league appearances and goals

Ahmed Ben Bella (Arabic: أحمد بن بلّة, romanized: Aḥmad bin Billah; 1916 – 11 April 2012) was an Algerian politician, soldier and revolutionary who served as the head of government of Algeria from 27 September 1962 to 15 September 1963 and then the first president of Algeria from 15 September 1963 until his overthrow on 19 June 1965.

Ben Bella played an important role during the Algerian war of independence against France, leading the National Liberation Front (FLN), organizing the shipment of foreign weapons and coordinating political strategy from Cairo. Despite not being present in Algeria, the French regime attempted to murder him multiple times. Once Algeria gained independence in 1962, Ben Bella's Oujda Group seized power from Benyoucef Benkhedda's provisional government, and Ben Bella became prime minister of Algeria with Ferhat Abbas as acting president. Ben Bella succeeded Ferhat Abbas on 15 September 1963 after rapidly sidelining him, and was elected president after winning an election with 99.6 percent of the votes.

Ben Bella pursued Arab socialist and pan-Arabist policies and came to describe himself as a Nasserist. He nationalized several industries and established good relations with other anti-Zionist Arab states and left-wing states such as Gamal Abdel Nasser's Egypt and Fidel Castro's Cuba. He encountered political conflict during his presidency, and was faced with border clashes in the Sand War with Morocco in 1963 and a failed rebellion by the Socialist Forces Front against his regime in 1963–1964. He was ousted from power and put under house arrest following a coup d'état by his Minister of Defense Houari Boumédiéne in 1965. He was freed from house arrest on 17 January 1980 and died in 2012.

== Early life ==
Ahmed Ben Bella was born in 1916 to Moroccan parents in the commune of Maghnia. His father was a farmer and small-time trader. He had four brothers and two sisters. His oldest brother died from wounds received in the First World War, during which he fought for France. Another brother died from illness and a third disappeared in France in 1940, during the mayhem of the Nazi victory.

Ben Bella began his studies in Maghnia, where he went to the French school, and continued them in the city of Tlemcen, where he first became aware of racial discrimination. Disturbed by the animus against Muslims expressed by his European teacher, he began chafing against imperialism and colonialism and criticized the domination of French cultural influence over Algeria. During this period, he joined the nationalist movement.

== Service with French Army ==
Ben Bella first volunteered for service in the French Army in 1936. The Army was one of the few avenues of advancement for Algerians under colonial rule and voluntary enlistment was common. Posted to Marseille, he played center midfield for Olympique de Marseille in 1939–1940. His only appearance for the club was in a game against FC Antibes in the Coupe de France on 29 April 1940 in Cannes, during which he scored a goal. Club officials offered him a professional spot on the team, but he rejected the offer. He also played for IRB Maghnia.

Ben Bella enlisted again in 1940, believing that the French Army offered the best opportunity for non-discriminatory treatment of Algerians. Fighting for France during the Second World War, he was decorated twice, receiving the Croix de Guerre after manning an anti-aircraft post during the Nazi invasion in 1940. He was demobilised after the fall of France, but joined a Free French regiment of Moroccan tirailleurs (infantry) with whom he saw service throughout the Italian campaign. In Italy, he was decorated for bravery demonstrated at the Battle of Monte Cassino, during which he dragged a wounded commissioned officer to safety, assuming control of his battalion. For this, he was promoted to the rank of warrant officer and received the Médaille militaire, the highest decoration of the Free French forces, directly from Charles de Gaulle.

On 8 May 1945, while France was celebrating Germany's surrender, widespread protests erupted in the Algerian town of Sétif. The war had intensified colonial repression of the Algerians, prompting a backlash that led to the deaths of more than 100 Europeans and around 1,500 Algerians, according to official reports. Anti-colonial insurgents, however, put the number of Algerian deaths at around 10,000. The fallout from the Sétif uprising shocked Ben Bella and his Algerian companions, as they realized that France would not recognize their claim to equal treatment despite their wartime service.

== Before independence ==
=== First organization for uprising against French regime in Algeria ===
After the Sétif and Guelma massacre in 1945, Ben Bella returned to Algeria, becoming politically active in the opposition movement against the French regime. French authorities sent assailants with the intention of assassinating him on his farm.

The attempt against his life failed, but the farm was confiscated and he went into hiding. After the nationalist parties had achieved great success in local elections in 1947, this was followed by the fixing of the Algerian Assembly elections in 1948 by French officials, agreed to and justified by the Socialist Governor-General Marcel-Edmond Naegelen, Ben Bella became convinced that achieving democratic independence through peaceful means was illusory. Together with Messali Hadj and his party, he helped to found the Organisation Spéciale (OS), a paramilitary organization whose strategic aim was to take up arms against the French colonial regime as quickly as possible. This group became the immediate predecessor of the National Liberation Front. He was in charge of organizing the wilayas (regional military sections of the FLN) and supplying weapons to insurgents and getting financial support from friendly Arab countries.

On 4 April 1949, Ben Bella led a robbery of the central post office in Oran to gain funds for the organization, obtaining 3 million francs which he used to buy weapons. He was eventually caught in 1950 and sentenced to eight years' imprisonment in Blida jail. In captivity, he was exposed to the writings of Sultan-Galiev, which greatly influenced him in the future. He escaped soon afterwards in 1952 by cutting through his prison window bars with a knife that had been smuggled into jail in a loaf of bread, making his way to Tunisia and then to Egypt, reaching Cairo by 1952 where he was granted sanctuary by the president Gamal Abdel Nasser.

At the outbreak of the Algerian War in 1954, Ben Bella was based in Cairo, where he had become one of the nine members of the Revolutionary Committee of Unity and Action that headed the Front de Liberation Nationale (FLN), founded in November that year during a secret meeting of Algerian leaders in Switzerland. The FLN soon began armed insurrection against the French colonists, which became a guerilla war in Algeria.

=== Algerian War ===
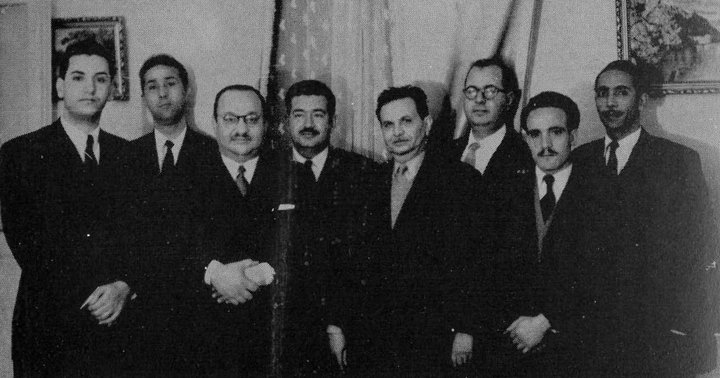
A meeting planning for the transfer of weapons from east base to the Algerians Freedom Fighters. Ben Bella is the second from the left.

Ben Bella played an important role during the war, leading the FLN, organizing the shipment of foreign weapons and coordinating political strategy. Although he was not present in Algeria, assassination attempts against him by French authorities persisted. After national independence, he was named vice president of Algeria in Benyoucef Benkhedda's cabinet.

Ben Bella and his associates were responsible for developing a system of bases and routes for providing the National Liberation Army (ALN) in Algeria with weapons, ammunition and other supplies. The ALN logistical system was focused in Egypt and Libya in the early years of the war. Once the French occupation of Tunisia and Morocco ended in 1956, Ben Bella and his associates established a system of camps in both countries for training men and sending them into Algeria.

Ben Bella felt excluded from the Soummam conference on 20 August 1956, and thus rejected it for its "secularism", the decision to integrate the European minority in independent Algeria, and the misrepresentation of delegates. According to Abane Ramdane, Ben Bella's rejection of the charter was due to the fact that it was drafted by Kabyles. Ben Bella was also accused of not providing enough money and weapons for the cause.

In 1956, he refused to receive a package delivered by taxi to his hotel in Cairo. A bomb exploded inside the taxi as it drove away, killing the driver. That same year, while in his hotel in Tripoli, a pied noir gunman with links to French intelligence called Jean David entered his room and fired, wounding but not killing him. The shooter was later killed by border guards while attempting to flee across the Libyan border.

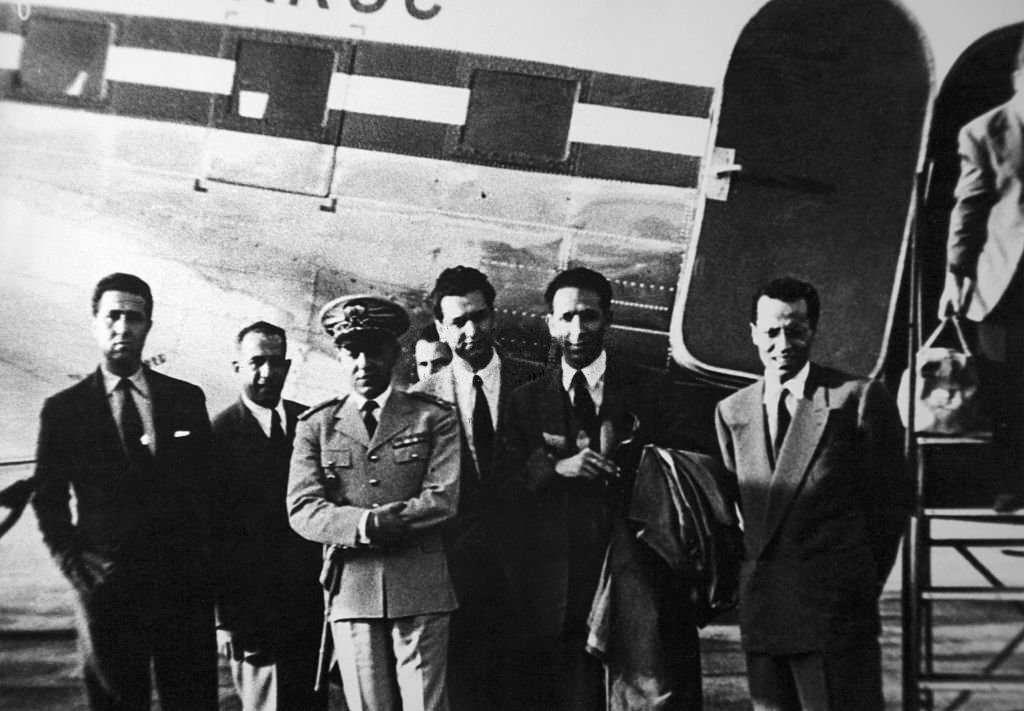
Ben Bella (far left) after his arrest by the French army

In October 1956, he was arrested in Algiers by French military authorities, who hijacked the plane on which he was flying. He was kept prisoner until the Evian accords in 1962, and released on 5 July. His arrest earlier had led to the resignation of Alain Savary, who was opposed to Guy Mollet's policies; as a prisoner during the height of the FLN terror campaign, he remained relatively untarnished by his association with the organization.

At the FLN conference in Tripoli in May–June 1962, Ben Bella repealed the Soummam conference and gave priority to the implementation of a national Arab-Islamic culture and identity of Algeria.

Like many Arab revolutionaries of the time, he came to describe himself as a "Nasserist" and developed close ties to Egypt even before national independence was achieved. Nasser's material, moral and political support of the Algerian movement became a source of geopolitical trouble for Egypt, as it played a major role in France's decision to wage war against him during the 1956 Suez Crisis.

Due to Pakistan's support for the FLN, Ben Bella had been given a Pakistani diplomatic passport to make his foreign travels possible in the face of an international manhunt co-ordinated by the French and their allies. Ben Bella also traveled on a Pakistani diplomatic passport during the years of his exile from Algeria in the 1980s.

== Algerian independence ==
=== Ben Bella's government ===
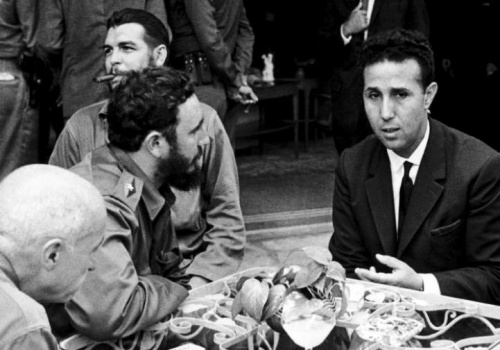
Ben Bella with Fidel Castro and Che Guevara, Cuba, 1962

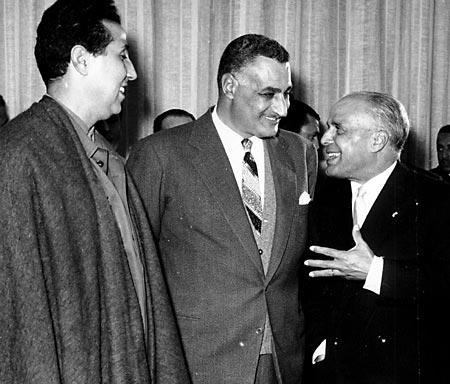
Egypt's President Nasser, with Tunisia's Bourguiba and Ben Bella, 1963

After Algeria's independence, Ben Bella quickly became a popular leader. In June 1962, he challenged the leadership of the premier, Benyoucef Benkhedda. This led to several disputes among his rivals in the FLN, which were quickly suppressed by Ben Bella's rapidly growing number of supporters, most notably within the armed forces, whose chief was Houari Boumédiènne. Boumédiènne marched his supporter troops to Algiers and Ben Bella seized power on 4 August in a coup d'état. By September 1962, Bella was in control of Algeria in all but name. He was elected premier in a one-sided election on 20 September, which was recognized by the United States on 29 September. Algeria was admitted as the 109th member of the United Nations on 8 October 1962.

As prime minister, Ben Bella arranged to legalize the seizures of autogestion spontaneously undertaken by Algerian workers. In March 1963, he drew up (with his circle of advisers) a set of decrees to nationalize all previously European-owned land. In his words, the "Tripoli program remained a dead letter, and independence and revolution made no sense, as long as Algerian soil was in hands of the big landowners".

He used his position to push for the approval of the constitution drawn up by the FLN, and alienated allies. Mohammed Khider and Ferhat Abbas resigned their political offices in 1963, dismayed by the dictatorial tendencies on display in Ben Bella's proposed constitution, which enshrined a one-party state and rejected political pluralism. Nevertheless, this action presented no problem to the Algerian people: the constitution was approved and, on 15 September 1963, Ben Bella was elected president of the country, unopposed and with an immense majority.

During his presidency, Ben Bella was confronted with the challenge of building a postcolonial state infrastructure from the ground up; the country had no independent state traditions and its senior civil servants had always been staffed by the French. Despite a predisposition toward an egalitarian way of governing and a lifestyle lacking in extravagance (he did not live in the governor's palace, and maintained an open-door policy with Algerian citizens), Ben Bella's actions in government did not always match his intentions. After stabilizing the country, he embarked on a series of initially popular but chaotically handled land reforms for the benefit of landless farmers, and increasingly turned to socialist rhetoric.

His policy of autogestion, or self-management, was adopted after Algerian peasants seized former French lands and was inspired by Marxist Yugoslavian leader Josip Broz Tito. He also worked on the development of his country, instituting reforms, undertaking campaigns for national literacy, and nationalizing several industries and calling for socialization of the economy and Arabization.

On many occasions, however, he improvised government policy as he went, as with his National Solidarity Fund, for which he asked the Algerian people to "voluntarily" hand over jewellery and banknotes.

In international relations, he had to maintain connections with the former colonial master France, and also accepted economic aid from both the US and the Soviet Union, as each sought to move his regime into its orbit and into opposition to the other. At the same time, Ben Bella wished Algeria to become a leader of Third World liberation movements and of the Third World itself. To strengthen relations with other colonies and former colonies, Algeria joined the Non-Aligned Movement under Ben Bella's regime, and he forged links with such African leaders as Gamal Abdel Nasser, Kwame Nkrumah, Modibo Keita and Sekou Toure to aid rebel movements throughout Africa.

He also established good relations with Fidel Castro, Che Guevara and Cuba. After his 1962 visit, Cuba sent a health mission to Algeria, with doctors and medical help, and later sent weapons and soldiers as aid during the Sand War against Morocco. He was awarded the title Hero of the Soviet Union on 30 April 1964.

During his tenure, Ben Bella encountered political struggles with former leaders of the FLN, including Mohammed Khider, Ferhat Abbas, Mohammed Boudiaf and Hocine Aït Ahmed. Ahmed founded the Front des Forces Socialistes (Socialist Forces Front) (FFS) to confront Ben Bella, and the others joined after being alienated by Ben Bella's dictatorial leadership. In 1963, the FFS called for an armed revolt against the regime. However, it had force only in the Kabylia region, and by the summer of 1964 the revolt was controlled and FFS leaders were arrested.

In addition to political resistance, Ben Bella faced religious opposition. The Association of the Algerian Ulema claimed that the "state Islam" that Ben Bella wanted to achieve was not an application of true Muslim values, but rather an attempt to please the population.

His government was overthrown in June 1965 while he was planning to host an Afro-Asian international meeting, in a bloodless coup led by his defense minister Houari Boumédiène. He was held for eight months in an underground prison, then for the next 14 years lived under house arrest.

=== House arrest and later freedom ===
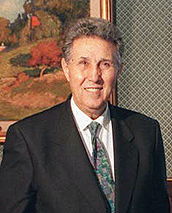
Ben Bella in 1997.

After being deposed in 1965, Ben Bella was detained for eight months in prison. He was then transferred to an isolated villa in Birouta, where he was placed under house arrest for 14 years. He was, however, permitted a private life there, and in 1971 he married Zohra Sellami, an Algerian journalist; their meeting was arranged by Ben Bella's mother. They became religiously observant Muslims, and adopted two girls, Mehdia and Nouria. After Boumedienne's death in 1978, restrictions on him were eased in July 1979, and he was freed on 17 January 1980. Ben Bella briefly resided in France but was then expelled in 1983. He moved to Lausanne, Switzerland, and launched the Mouvement pour la Démocratie en Algérie (MDA), a moderate Islamic opposition party, in 1984. In September 1990, he returned to Algeria, and, in 1991, led the MDA in the first round of the country's abortive parliamentary elections. He led campaigns in support of the Palestinian cause, against United States foreign policy, and expressed support for the Iraqi invasion of Kuwait by Saddam Hussein in 1990. The MDA was banned in 1997.

== Later life ==
In 2003, Ben Bella was elected president of the International Campaign Against Aggression on Iraq at its Cairo Conference. He described himself numerous times in interviews as an Islamist of a "mild and peace-loving flavour". Despite his former establishment of a one-party state after Algeria gained its independence, he became a vocal advocate for democracy in Algeria. He described the militant tendency arising in the Islamic world as having developed from an incorrect and faulty interpretation of Islam. Despite controversies, he was respected for his role in the anti-colonial struggle and was seen by many Arab intellectuals as one of the last original Arab nationalists.

He was also the chairperson of the African Union Panel of the Wise, which is mandated to advise the AU Commission on issues relevant to conflict prevention, management and resolution. The other members of the panel at the time were President Miguel Trovoada (former president of São Tomé and Príncipe), Dr. Salim A. Salim (former Secretary-General of the OAU), Dr. Brigalia Bam (Chair of South Africa's Electoral Commission) and Elisabeth Pognon (former President of the Constitutional Court of Benin).

== Illness, death and state funeral ==
In February 2012, Ben Bella was admitted to a hospital for medical checks. At the same time, a report circulated that he had died, but this was denied by his family.

Ben Bella died on 11 April 2012 at his family home in Algiers. Though the reasons of his death were unknown, he had been treated for respiratory illnesses twice at Ain Naadja. His body lay in state on 12 April before the funeral at El Alia Cemetery on 13 April. Algeria declared eight days of national mourning.

=== Heads of state and government present at state funeral ===
Country	Title	Dignitary
Mauritania	Prime Minister	Moulaye Ould Mohamed Laghdaf
Morocco	Prime Minister	Abdelilah Benkirane
Sahrawi Republic	President	Mohamed Abdelaziz
Tunisia	President	Moncef Marzouki

== Awards and honors ==
- Algeria:
  - Sadr of the National Order of Merit (1999)
- Czechoslovakia:
  - Grand Cross of the Order of the White Lion (1964)
- France:
  - Croix de Guerre (1940)
  - Médaille militaire (1944)
- Morocco:
  - Grand Cordon of the Order of Ouissam Alaouite (2007)
- Singapore:
  - Order of Temasek (1963)
- South Africa:
  - Order of the Companions of O. R. Tambo (2004)
- Soviet Union:
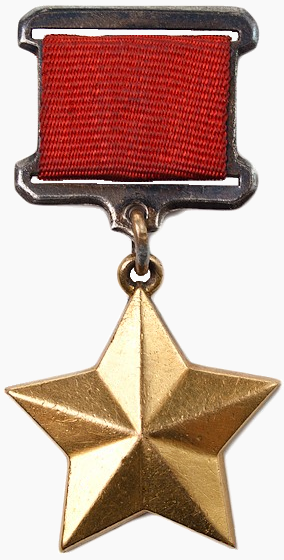
  - Hero of the Soviet Union (1964)
  - Order of Lenin (1964)
  - Lenin Peace Prize (1964)
- Yugoslavia:
  - Order of the Yugoslav Star (1964)

== Notes ==
Political offices
Preceded by Ferhat Abbas as President of the National Constituent Assembly	President of Algeria; 1963–1965	Succeeded by Houari Boumédiène as Chairman of the Revolutionary Council
Preceded by Benyoucef Benkhedda as Head of the Provisional Government of the Algerian Republic	Prime Minister of Algeria; 1962–1963	Vacant Title next held by Mohamed Ben Ahmed Abdelghani
