= Reggane Aerodrome =

Former airport in Reggane, Algeria

- IATA: none; ICAO: none

Summary
- Airport type: Defunct
- Serves: Reggane
- Location: Adrar Province in central Algeria
- Opened: 1922
- Closed: 1958
- Coordinates: 26°42′44″N 0°10′32″E

Map
- Location in Algeria

Reggane Aerodrome was an airfield located in Reggane, Adrar Province in central Algeria. It was established in 1922 to support French colonial aviation interests, and was popular due to its central location in the country. It was superseded by Reggane Airport in 1958.

== History ==
Reggane Aerodrome was developed in 1922 by the 2e Groupe d’Aviation d’Afrique (GAA), when the unit began working on the western Sahara route from Colomb-Béchar in 1921. The aerodrome was developed as part of the Colomb-Béchar - Adrar - Reggane axis. In 1923, the Compagnie Générale Transsaharienne (CGT) began developing the corresponding overland route. Afterwards, regular trans-Saharan automobile services began on the route. Within the first seven years of operation, the 2e GAA further developed an aircraft shelter and fuel depot at the aerodrome, also establishing 45 landing grounds between Colomb-Béchar and Reggan with visibility made readily to aircraft.

Extensive aerial marking was installed on the Reggan-Gao route was done in 1932, and the CGT commenced a regular air service on that route in 1934. The route was favourable for motor vehicles and aircraft operations. The primary landmark was a succession of almost uninterrupted palm grommets, situated approximately 8-10 kilometres west of the track. It was compulsory for pilots to inform the local authorities the time of departure, the destination, and approximate time of arrival. The service operated without any government subsidy until the end of the season. In the following season, the CGT would either continue or intensify the service.

Following the Second World War, the CGT returned to commercial aviation operations, although its first service did not include Reggane Aerodrome. Scheduled operations at the aerodrome would return in August 1947, when the CGT extended its Algiers–Colomb-Béchar service southward. The aerodrome, serving as an intermediate stop, would have a weekly service from Algiers to Niamey via Colomb-Béchar, Adrar, Reggane, Arguel'Hoc, and Gao. It utilised the Junkers Ju 52s.

=== Closure ===
In 1958, Reggane Aerodrome was replaced by a larger airfield constructed by the Centre Saharien d’Expérimentations Militaires (CSEM). Construction for it commenced in late 1957, and the first major convoy arrived at the site on 20 January 1958. In May 1958, the permanent 2,400 metre long runway entered service.

== Facilities ==
By the mid-1930s, Reggane Aerodrome was equipped with a gravelled stone landing ground measuring 1,000 metres by 300 metres to the west and 600 metres to the east. It had white fringe markings, white landing circle, and a windsock at the northeast corner of the CGT bordj. The only obstacle was a 20 metre tall wireless mast located 30 metres to the west. The aerodrome also had a petrol distributor and an AeroShell oil stock. It was located east of the CGT bordj, which housed a CGT hotel, garage, T.S.F. wireless facilities, equipment depot, and the Bordj René Estienne. It was also well-equipped, storing a stock of lubricants, petrol, and also providing a breakdown and recovery service for automobiles and aircraft at the aerodrome.

Mail could be deposited at the hotel. Excursions were available to Zouïet-Reggan and Taourirt. A nearby military post was also present near the CGT bordj. It was red in colour, 500 metres from the track on the overland approach, and managed by the Adjudant, Post Commander.

== Accidents & incidents ==
- Desperate to break the contested England - South Africa record, British aviator and pioneer Bill Lancaster departed the aerodrome on the evening of 12 April 1933, aiming for a 750 mi (1,210 km) night crossing of the Sahara. However, his aircraft—an Avro Avian—experience an engine failure less than an hour's flying, and he crash-landed in the desert far north of his expected flight path. Relatively uninjured, he occasionally fired flares while awaiting rescue. Searches by aircraft, however, were too far to the south, and a car searching from Reggane was also unsuccessful. Surviving by resting under the shade of the wing, Lancaster would log each day in a personal dairy. He died eight days later from dehydration on 20 April 1933. His final message, written on a fuel card on the morning of the 20th, was "So the beginning of the eighth day has dawned. It is still cool. I have no water. I am waiting patiently. Come soon please. Fever wracked me last night. Hope you get my full log. Bill." On 12 February 1962, the crash site was discovered by French troops, finding the wreckage, his dairy, and the mummified remains of Lancaster.

== See also ==
- French colonial aviation in Africa
