= Adrar Aerodrome =

Former airport in Reggane, Algeria

- Hurel-Dubois HD.34 of French Institut Géographique National at Adrar Aerodrome, taken in 1956.
- IATA: none; ICAO: DAUA

Summary
- Airport type: Defunct
- Serves: Adrar
- Location: Adrar Province in central Algeria
- Opened: 1922; 104 years ago
- Closed: January 15, 1983
- Coordinates: 27°53′27″N 0°16′20″W

Map
- Location in Algeria

Runways
| Direction | Length | | Surface |
| Direction | ft | m | Surface |
|---|---|---|---|
| 07/25 | 5,905 | 1,800 | Bitumen |
| 18/36 | 4,977 | 1,517 | Unpaved |

Adrar Aerodrome (ICAO: DAUA) was an airfield located 1 kilometre northeast of Adrar, the capital of the Adrar province in central Algeria. It was established in 1922 to support emerging French colonial interests, and served as a stopover for trans-Sahara expeditions. It was modernised in the 1950s to accommodate larger aircraft. In 1978, construction for its replacement began and the airport closed on 15 January 1983, when Touat-Cheikh Sidi Mohamed Belkebir Airport opened.

Adrar Aerodrome is not to be confused with the landing ground at Adrar Madet in Niger, which share characteristics.

== History ==
In 1921, the 2e Groupe d'Aviaton d'Afrique (2e GAA - 2nd African Aviation Group) was in charge of Saharan exploration. The group gradually established the Colomb-Béchar - La Saoura - Beni Abbès - Adrar - Reggan route. In the winter of 1922-23, a squadron of the 2nd GAA began reconnaissance flights to Beni-Abbès and Adrar, under the orders of Cne Darbos and Lt Palacio. Following the missions, an aerodrome was established at Adrar with two aircraft shelters and a gasoline tank. It was among the larger network of 45 landing grounds between Reggane and Colomb-Béchar.

In November 1923, organised by General Jean-Baptiste Estienne and the newly founded Compagnie générale transsaharienne (CGT) trans-Saharan expedition Mission Algérie-Niger commenced. The mission aimed at surveying and determining a north-south route from Algeria through the Sahara toward Niger, suitable for motor and air transport. The convoy comprised four Citroën-Kégresse half-tracked vehicles and a Nieuport-Dekage aircraft with folding wings carried on a trailer. The aircraft was intended to photograph both sides of the route, however its towing attachment was damages during an attempted landing in the dunes near Hassi-el-Hamri. The aircraft was left at Adrar Aerodrome when the convoy reached Adrar on 17 November. After successfully reaching Tessalit, the convoy returned to Adrar on 13 December and picked up the Nieuport.

By 1934, Adrar Aerodrome was equipped with a 1,000 metre by 1,000 metre firm-surfaced landing ground. It was marked with white fringe markings and white landing circle. There was a 30 by 30 metre hangar, with an orientable T-shaped wind indicator and windsock in front of it. The two aircraft shelters were still in use. Aviation fuel was directly available at the aerodrome, and it held AeroShell oil stocks and a fuel distributor. There was also a military meteorological station and military repair workshop at Adrar. Aviators entering the airfield had access to the Hôtel Djemila, and the Dar-Diaf (Guest House) if the hotel was not operating. During the Second World War, Adrar Aerodrome continued serving as an airfield on the trans-Saharan network. On 20 August 1945, the Armée de l'Air established the West-Saharan route from Algiers to In-Salah via Colomb-Béchar, Timimoun, and Adrar. In August 1947, Aéro-Africaine explained their Alger — Colomb-Béchar service to Niamey, including Adrar as an intermediate stop among Reggane, Aguel'hoc, and Gao. On 11 November 1952, Air France commenced a service from Algiers to Tamanrasset, with Adrar as an intermediate stop among El Goléa and Aoulef.

=== Modernisation ===
Beginning in 1953, Algeria launched a program to equip Saharan aerodromes with paved runways to handle the aircraft such as the Douglas DC-4 and Breguet 763 Deux-Ponts. Subsequently, a paved runway was constructed at Adrar Aerodrome. Following construction, Douglas DC-3 aircraft began operating there for petroleum exploration in 1954. Additionally, the new runway allowed Air France to utilise their Bréguet Deux-Ponts, DC-4s, and DC-3s at Adrar Aerodrome. This followed a 1954 arrangement between Air France and the Government-General for exclusive air transport between the Mediterranean and Southern Territories.

During the Algerian War, Groupe de Transport 2/64 "Anjou" (Transport Squadron 2/64) arrived at Blida on 1 December 1956. When the group began operating the Noratoas aircraft, Adrar was included in its regular Sahara routes. The group's C-47 aircraft also operated at aerodrome. In 1959-60, Adrar Aerodrome received runway improvements, an upgraded aircraft parking apron, and air-navigation safety installations. Airport housing, operational buildings and a terminal were also built during the construction programme.

=== Closure ===
The old terminal building of Adrar Aerodrome in 2013, the ATC booth has since been removed.

In 1978, construction of a replacement airport began southeast of Adrar, and works were completed by the end of 1980. It had a new 3,000 x 45 metre runway designated 04/22, a taxiway, and an apron. A Boeing 737 test flight was conducted in 1981, after which the runway was strengthened before the airport entered service. On 15 January 1983, the new Adrar-Touat Airport officially replaced Adrar Aerodrome, and the new aerodrome was inaugurated shortly thereafter. The old Adrar Aerodrome was superseded and closed afterwards.

== Facilities ==
Adrar Aerodrome was equipped with a 1,800 x 45 metre paved runway numbered 07/25 and an intersecting 1517 x 60 metre runway numbered 18/36. The apron and terminal was located at the southwestern end of runway 07/25 and a 300 metre long taxiway connected the apron to the southern end of runway 18/37.

== See also ==
- French colonial aviation in Africa

== Bibliography ==
- Société Shell d'Algérie (1936). Guide du tourisme automobile et aérien au Sahara, 1936 (in French). Alger: Société Anonyme Française des Pétroles Shell.
