= Fort Flatters Aerodrome =

Former airport in Bordj Omar Driss, Algeria

- An undated oblique photograph of Fort Flatters Aerodrome.
- IATA: none; ICAO: DAAW

Summary
- Airport type: Defunct
- Serves: Fort Flatters
- Location: Illizi Province in central east Algeria
- Opened: 1928
- Closed: 1978
- Coordinates: 28°07′57″N 6°50′02″E

Map
- Location in Algeria

Fort Flatters Aerodrome (ICAO: DAAW) was an airport located in Fort Flatters (presently Bordj Omar Driss), in Illizi, Algeria. It was established in 1928 following a ground reconnaissance expedition, serving as a point for many pioneering expeditions. By the 1950s, it was integrated into civil aviation networks and housed an air force detachment. Following a crash at Tamanrasset in 1967, a regular service at the aerodrome was discontinued. It was still used by emergency aircraft until 1978.

== History ==
=== Development ===
In a ground reconnaissance expedition held during February to March 1928 by the section automobile d'Ouargoa, with participant Lieutenant Léon Deschamps of the 3e Groupe d'Aviation d'Afrique, Fort Flatters was reconnoitred as part of a route between Ouargla and Djanet. It utilised Citroën-Kégresse automobiles. At the time, 3e GAA had been assigned to undertake the eastern Saharan route, however its work had been delayed. The group participated in operations held at Rif from 1925, preventing it from undertaking new activity in the département de Constantine for two years. Three connected axes were developed to Fort Flatters as result of the mission: from Ouargla via Fort Lallemand, to Fort Saint, and to Djanet via Amguid. Following the reconnaissance expedition, a landing ground was developed at Fort Flatters around late 1928 to early 1929. On 2 February 1929, three aircraft belonging to the 3e GAA undertook a reconnaissance flight between Fort Lallemand and Ouargla, though Fort Flatters was excluded from the mission. The existing automobile track was poorly defined, and the aircraft repeatedly lost sight of it, nevertheless they successfully reached Fort Lallemand and Ouargla. Subsequently, in February 1929, the route between the two was marked with white balises. It was extended in August 1932 by Deschamps to include Fort Flatters Aerodrome during a five-month campaign. It had marked the axes to Fort-Saint and between Fort-Lallemand to Amguid via Fort Flatters.

=== Operations ===
Due to Fort Flatters role as a junction, it possessed a T.S.F. wireless station with callsign FVM2 sign since early 1929. It conducted radio experiments on 7, 10, and 14 MHz. It had been used by aviators to send news by radio to their families from Fort Flatters. By the 1930s, Fort Flatters Aerodrome had a landing area of 700 metres by 500 metres, marked by white painted fringes and landing circle. It had no windsock for wind indication, and weather was provided by a military meteorological station at Flatters. The ground was described as being somewhat heavy and very heavy for four days after rain. The only obstacle located 50 metres to the south of the airfield were hills running east to west, approximately 15 metres high. It had a petrol distribution provided by Shell along with stocks of AeroShell oil. For aviators staying overnight, basic accommodation was provided by guest rooms at the military bordj (post) as there was no hotel. The aerodrome and the military bordj were the two notable landmarks in Fort Flatters. The post was commanded by a Maréchal des Logis, which housed the T.S.F., military post office, and a food depot although supplies were restricted. Vehicles could be parked in its courtyard.

There was a second aerodrome located 14 kilometres to the south, though Fort Flatters Aerodrome was more preferable given its shorter distance from the fort. There were multiple established air routes from Flatters, including Flatters to Fort Saint and Flatters to Amguid. These air routes would follow motor tracks marked by sheet-metal balises painted white at 10-kilometre intervals installer from the earlier expedition. On the western edge of the track, there was an emergency landing ground marked at Ticeras for the route towards Amguid. The route between to Fort-Saint was also marked with the same conditions. At the 305 kilometre mark of the route, there was a marked emergency landing ground located west of the motor track.

By the 1940s, regulation inscription "FLATTERS" was marked inside the landing circle. The landing ground was expanded to 700 metres by 600 metres in a diamond shape. By Summer 1948, approximately ten French military personnel were stationed at Fort Flatters. An adjutant, radio sergeant, and a Saharan enlisted man occupied the bordj, while three Air Force corporals operated the radio station.

=== Modernisation ===
On 11 October 1954, Air France inaugurated an Alger to Fort Polignac service via Ouargla and Fort Flatters operated by the Douglas DC-3. By the end of 1956 amidst the Algerian War, the French Air Force presence at Fort Flatters had only amounted to only six men and two tents. Following the evacuation of its base in Fezzan, the reorganisation of defence in the Sahara-Libyan frontier commenced. An Eastern Sahara command was established at Ouargla, with sectors at Fort Flatters and Djanet, though the aerodrome was excluded from having defensive works. On 1 March 1957, Instruction No. 5422 of the Air Force Headquarters ordered the creation of Détachement de Terrain (DTO) 48/540. It was based at the aerodrome as a subordinate to Ouargla to reinforce deployment along the frontier. In 1958, Poste de commandement Air 13/540 was established at the aerodrome, functionally serving as an Air Command Post. It had operated until 1962.

=== Closure ===
On 11 April 1967, an Air Algérie Douglas DC-4 crashed approximately 8 kilometres from Tamanrasset on approach to its airport, killing 35 while four survived. Following the crash, the regular service at Fort Flatters Aerodrome was discontinued. Emergency medical evacuation aircraft continued using the aerodrome until 1978.

== Facilities ==
Fort Flatters Aerodrome was equipped with a runway measuring 1,800 metres long and 60 metres wide designated 07/25 and an apron with two taxiways on the southwestern side. The airport was not equipped with a control tower, local control, and approach control. Runway 07 was equipped with VHF Direction Finding (VDF), and there was a non-directional beacon (NDB) present south from the apron. It had an altitude of 368 metres.

== Units ==
The following units that were based at Fort Flatters Aerodrome:

- Détachement de Terrain 48/540 (Operational Field Detachment 48/540), 1 March 1957
- Poste de commandement Air 13/540 (Air Command Post 13/530) between 1958 and 1962
- Detachment of Groupe Saharien de Reconnaissance et d'Appui 76 (Saharan Reconnaissance and Support Group 76) between 1956 and 1963
- Detachment of Groupe d'Outre-Mer 86 (Overseas Group 86) "Grands Ergs"

== See also ==
- French colonial aviation in Africa
