= Reggane Airport =

- IATA: none; ICAO: DAAN

Summary
- Airport type: Public
- Serves: Reggane
- Location: Algeria
- Elevation AMSL: 955 ft (291 m)
- Coordinates: 26°42′36″N 0°17′08″E

Map
- Location of Reggane Airport in Algeria

Runways
| Direction | Length | | Surface |
| Direction | m | ft | Surface |
|---|---|---|---|
| 07/25 | 2,484 | 8,150 | Concrete/Asphalt |
- Source: Landings.com

Reggane Airport (ICAO: DAAN) is a public use airport located 7 nm east of Reggane, Adrar, Algeria.

== History ==
The Centre Saharien d’Expérimentations Militaires began construction of Reggane Airport in late 1957, and the first major convoy arrived at the site on 20 January 1958. In May 1958, the permanent 2,400 metre long runway entered service, and the older Reggane Aerodrome was closed afterwards. The 1962 Evian arrangements allowed the French military to use Reggane Airport for five more years. In 1967, military use ended and the site was returned to Algeria in June 1967. Afterwards, it began operating as a civilian airport.
