= Djanet Inedbirene Airport =

Tiska Djanet Airport Djanet Inedbirene
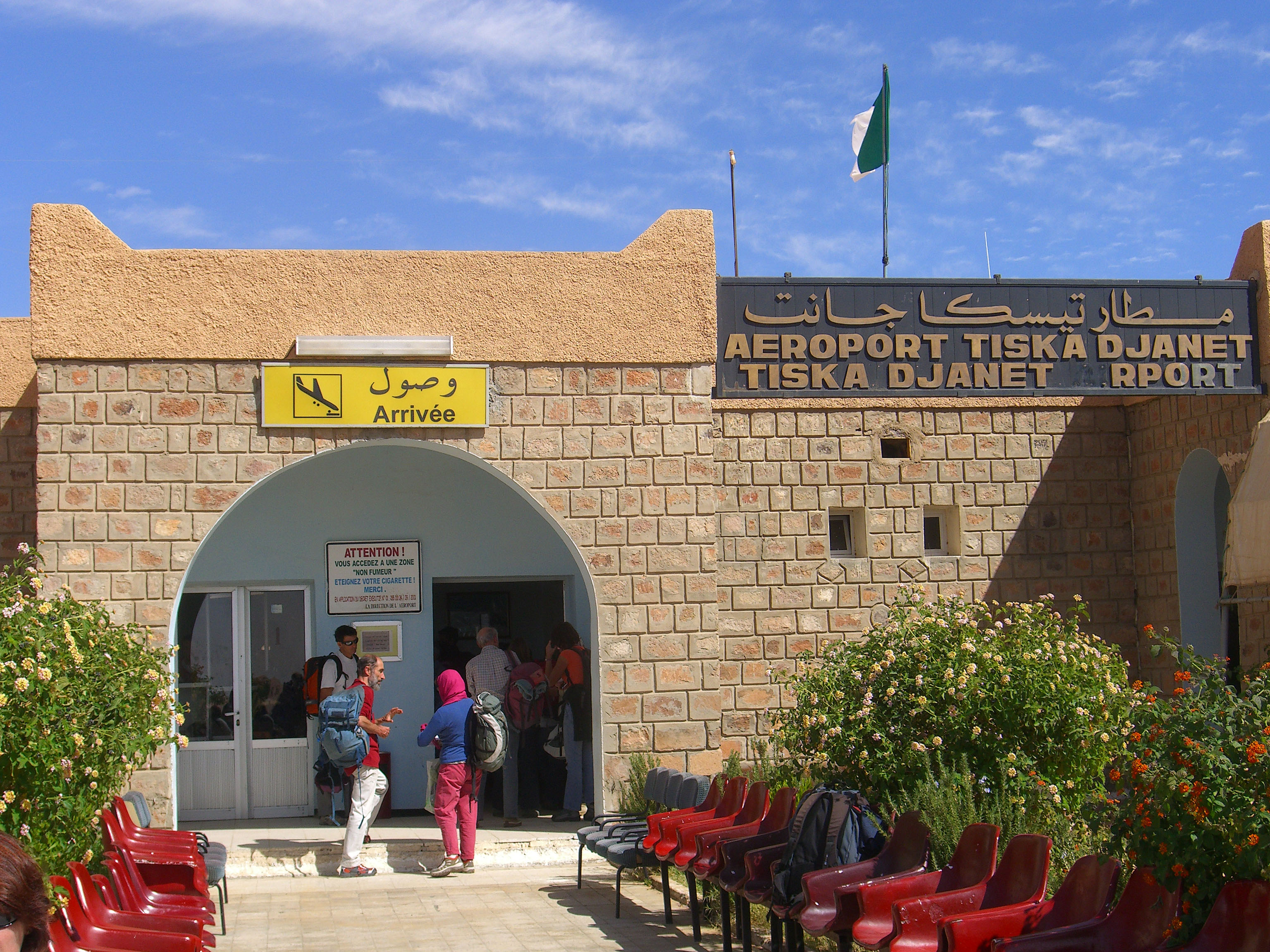
- IATA: DJG; ICAO: DAAJ

Summary
- Airport type: Public
- Operator: EGSA Alger
- Serves: Djanet, Algeria
- Elevation AMSL: 966 m (3,169 ft)
- Coordinates: 24°17′34″N 9°27′8″E

Map
- Location of airport in Algeria

Runways
| Direction | Length | | Surface |
| Direction | m | ft | Surface |
|---|---|---|---|
| 02/20 | 2,400 | 7,874 | Asphalt |
| 13/31 | 3,000 | 9,843 | Asphalt |
- Source: Algerian AIP Landings.com

Tiska Djanet Airport (IATA: DJG, ICAO: DAAJ) is an airport serving Djanet, Algeria. The airport is in the desert 30 kilometres (19 mi) south of Djanet. There is a VOR/DME and an NDB on the field for navigation.

== History ==
Originally, Djanet Aerodrome served the city of Djanet, and was located 12 kilometres (7.5 mi) south of Djanet. In 1981, construction of a new airport located 18 kilometres south from the aerodrome began. Two new runways, one main measuring 3,000 metres in length and one secondary measuring 1,400 metres in length were built. During a trip that spanned 26 to 31 January, 1981, Minister of Public Works Mohamed Kortebi inspected the construction progress of the airport. In 1984, Tiska Djanet Airport was opened, replacing the existing aerodrome. In May 2002, ENNA completed a new technical block and an electrical power station.

=== 2007 Djanet Airport attack ===
Dissatisfaction with the Algerian authorities, backed by rising unemployment, food price, and civil unrest, drove Tuareg youths from the Djanet oasis to launch an attack on the airport. However, other reports are conflicting to the incident. Other US information services state, that al-Qaeda terrorists based in northern Mali were behind the attacks.

According to Algerian media, on 8 November 2007, about ten terrorists arrived in three off-road vehicles and fired at Djanet Airport using rocket-propelled grenades and machine guns. No deaths or injuries were reported at the time of attack. Independent French newspaper, El Watan stated that the terrorists damaged an Air Algérie plane, while Le Soir d'Algérie reported at two helicopters and a military aircraft were hit.

Most reports stated that the attackers were able to escape by crossing into the border with Niger and Mali. However, Echorouk Al Yaoumi—an Algerian newspaper owned by private media conglomerate Echorouk Group—added that army forces responded with an operation that resulted in the captures and deaths of the terrorists. The incident was further embellished by Algerian authorities, stating that the Djanet attackers initially attacked oil facilities—although there were none in the region.

== Airlines and destinations ==
| Airlines | Destinations | Refs |
|---|---|---|
| Air Algérie | Algiers, Illizi, Ouargla, Paris–Charles de Gaulle, Tamanrasset | |
