= Ahmed Ben Bella Airport =

Ahmed Ben Bella Airport مطار أحمد بن بلة
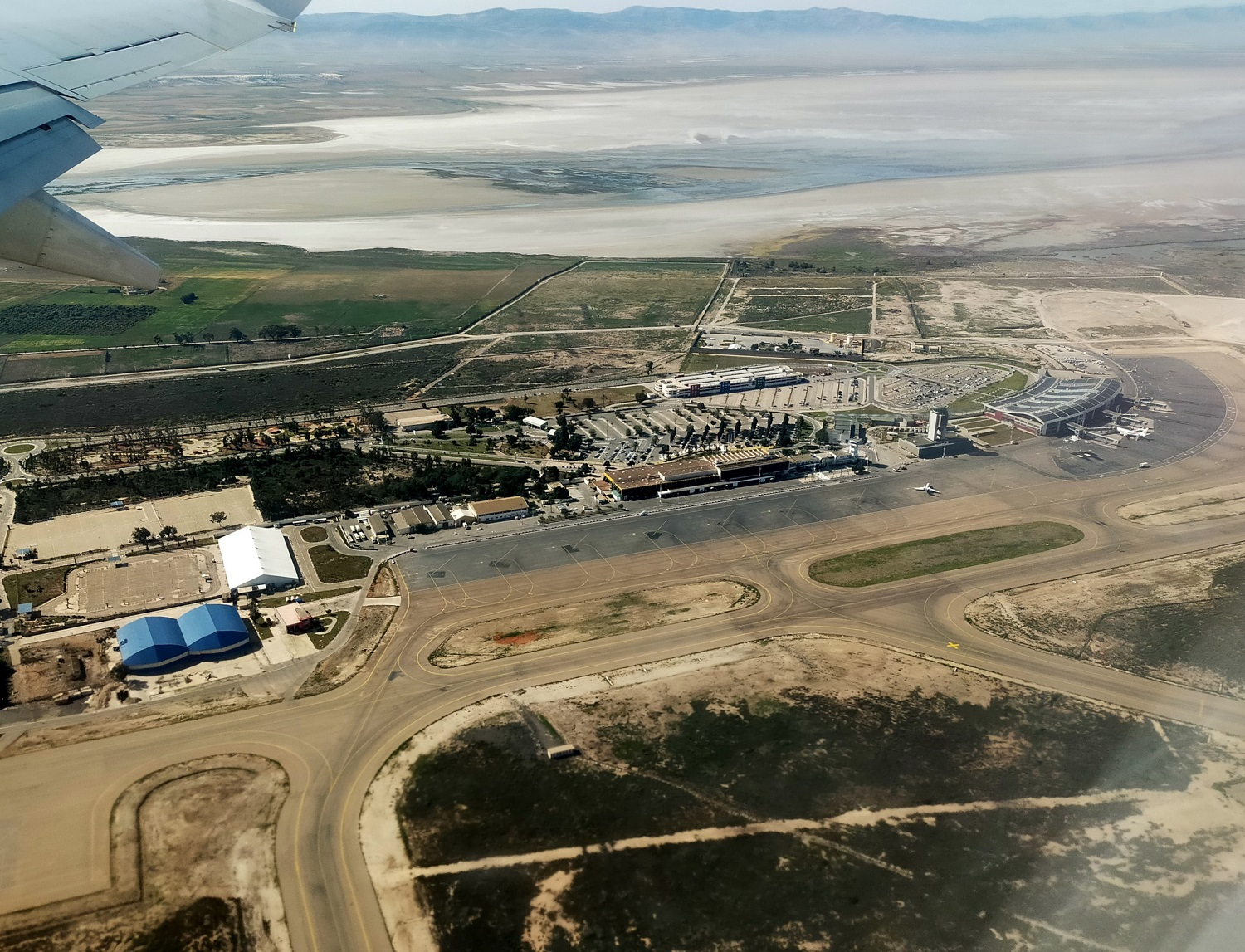
- IATA: ORN; ICAO: DAOO

Summary
- Airport type: Public
- Operator: EGSA Oran
- Serves: Oran
- Location: Es Senia, Algeria
- Focus city for: Air Algérie
- Time zone: CET (UTC+1)
- Elevation AMSL: 90 m (300 ft)
- Coordinates: 35°37′17.7″N 0°37′23.7″W
- Website: lesaeroportsdoran.dz

Map
- Location of airport in Algeria

Runways
| Direction | Length | | Surface |
| Direction | m | ft | Surface |
|---|---|---|---|
| 07L/25R | 3,600 | 11,811 | Concrete |
| 07R/25L | 3,000 | 9,843 | Concrete |

Statistics (2010)
- Passengers: 1,085,753
- Passenger change 09–10: ▼1.5%
- Aircraft movements: 15,323
- Movements change 09–10: ▲8.5%
- Sources: Algerian AIP, DAFIF, Landings.com, ACI's 2010 World Airport Traffic Report.

Ahmed Ben Bella Airport (Arabic: مطار أحمد بن بلة, French: Aéroport international d'Oran - Ahmed Ben Bella), formally Es Senia Airport (IATA: ORN, ICAO: DAOO) is an airport located 4.7 nm (8.7 km) south of Oran (near Es Senia), in Algeria.

== History ==
During World War II, La Sénia Airport was used by the French Air Force as a military airfield, first by the Armée de l'Air, and after June 1940, by the Armistice Air Force (French: Armée de l'Air de Vichy) of the Vichy government.

During the Operation Torch landings in 1942, La Sénia was one of the primary objectives of the assault on Oran on 9 November. A paratroop task force was to directly seize La Sénia, with an armored task force to thrust inland to insure the capture of the field. Just after daylight, eight Albacore dive bombers from H.M.S. Furious and six Hurricane fighter escorts from each of the two auxiliary carriers swung back over La Sénia airfield in broad daylight to be greeted by strong antiaircraft fire and Vichy fighters. The airfield was attacked in response by six 250-pound general-purpose bombs with which it accurately struck and wrecked the empty hangars on the northwestern side of the airdrome, inflicting destruction which was later to be regretted. In the ensuing dogfights, five Dewoitine 520 French fighters were claimed shot down and others damaged. A second attack on La Sénia airfield were delivered a few minutes later by ten Seafires from H.M.S. Furious in low-level strafing runs against grounded planes and antiaircraft batteries. Again Vichy French fighters contested the action. The Vichy fighters, however only defended the airfield vicinity and did not oppose the ground forces landing at Oran Harbor. The planned air assault against the airfield was redirected, and the airfield was captured by Company B, of the 1st Armored Regiment about 1000, after many Vichy Aircraft already flown off, presumably to French Morocco. A few remained dispersed on the ground or in the hangars.

After its capture, the airport was used by the United States Army Air Forces Twelfth Air Force as a combat airfield during the North African Campaign. The following units were assigned to the base in 1942 and 1943:

- HQ, XII Fighter Command, 12 November–December 1942; 12 January – 20 March 1943
- HQ, 51st Troop Carrier Wing, 28 March – 13 May 1943
- 3d Reconnaissance Group, 10–25 December 1942 (Various Reconnaissance aircraft)
- 31st Fighter Group, 12 November 1942 – 7 February 1943, Supermarine Spitfire
- 52d Fighter Group, 14 November 1942 – 1 January 1943, Supermarine Spitfire
- 86th Bombardment Group, 12 May – 3 June 1943, North American A-36 Apache
- 320th Bombardment Group, 2 December 1942 – 28 January 1943, Martin B-26 Marauder

Once the combat units moved east to other airfields in Algeria and Tunisia during the late spring of 1943, the airfield came under the control of Air Transport Command, under which it functioned as a stopover en route to Algiers airport or to Port Lyautey Airfield, in French Morocco on the North African Cairo–Dakar transport route for cargo, transiting aircraft and personnel.

== Expansion ==
Andrade Gutierrez, a Brazilian company has won a contract to construct a new runway in Oran Airport, located in the second largest city in Algeria. The construction was estimated to cost EUR 20 million. Oran has a population of around 650,000. Being the second largest city in the country, Oran is an important industrial, educational and cultural centre. The construction work at Oran airport is the second contract won by the company in Algeria. The new 9,843 feet long runway 07R/25L has been operational since 12 February 2009.

Currently, the airport is composed of two terminals, one for domestic flights and the other for international flights. The international terminal is basically the previous airport, while the domestic terminal is a recent "huge tent" as the Algerians call it.

A new international terminal has been built; Terminal 3 has a surface area of 41,000 m2, which should allow the reception of 3.5 million passengers, extendable to 6 million passengers per year, which will bring the total capacity with the current terminal to 5.5 million passengers. It has 6 telescopic gangways as well as two cargo hangars with a surface area of 2,000 m2 and a capacity of 15,000 t/year. It also is equipped with photovoltaic panels for its electrical energy needs. It was inaugurated on 23 June 2022 by president Abdelmadjid Tebboune.

== Airlines and destinations ==
The following airlines operate regular scheduled passenger flights at Oran Ahmed Ben Bella Airport:

| Airlines | Destinations |
|---|---|
| Air Algérie | Adrar, Algiers, Alicante, Annaba, Barcelona, Bechar, Bordeaux, Constantine, El Bayadh, Ghardaïa, Hassi Messaoud, In Amenas, Istanbul, Lille, Lyon, Marseille, Mécheria, Montpellier, Ouargla, Paris–Charles de Gaulle, Paris–Orly, Timimoun, Tindouf, Toulouse; Seasonal: Alicante, Brussels, Lisbon, Metz/Nancy; Seasonal charter: Sharm El Sheikh |
| Air France | Paris–Charles de Gaulle, Toulouse |
| ASL Airlines France | Lille; Seasonal: Basel/Mulhouse, Perpignan |
| Domestic Airlines | Adrar, Algiers, Bechar, Hassi Messaoud, Setif |
| Nouvelair | Seasonal: Tunis |
| Transavia | Lyon, Montpellier, Nantes, Paris–Orly |
| TUI fly Belgium | Brussels |
| Tunisair | Tunis |
| Turkish Airlines | Istanbul |
| Volotea | Bordeaux, Marseille |
| Vueling | Alicante, Barcelona |

== Statistics ==
Traffic by calendar year. Official ACI Statistics
| | Passengers | Change from previous year | Aircraft operations | Change from previous year | Cargo (metric tons) | Change from previous year |
|---|---|---|---|---|---|---|
| 2005 | 850,198 | ▲2.39% | 10,865 | ▼2.76% | 1,374 | ▼11.58% |
| 2006 | 865,704 | ▲1.82% | 10,908 | ▲0.40% | 1,961 | ▲42.72% |
| 2007 | 971,134 | ▲12.18% | 11,166 | ▲2.37% | 2,857 | ▲45.69% |
| 2008 | 994,273 | ▲2.38% | 11,859 | ▲6.21% | 2,122 | ▼25.73% |
| 2009 | 1,101,797 | ▲10.81% | 14,129 | ▲19.14% | 1,336 | ▼37.04% |
| 2010 | 1,085,753 | ▼1.46% | 15,323 | ▲8.45% | 1,189 | ▼11.00% |
| 2014 | 1 558 614 | ▲ % | 19 222 | ▲ % | | % |
| 2015 | 1,675,930 | ▲7.09% | 20,276 | ▲5.2% | 843 | % |
| 2016 | 1,851,910 | ▲11% | 21,929 | ▲8.15% | 1,270 | ▲50.6% |
Source: Airports Council International. World Airport Traffic Reports (Years 2005, 2006, 2007, 2009 and 2010)
