= Cheikh Bouamama Airport =

- IATA: MZW; ICAO: DAAY

Summary
- Airport type: Military
- Serves: Mécheria
- Location: Algeria
- Elevation AMSL: 3,855 ft / 1,175 m
- Coordinates: 33°32′8.3″N 0°14′32.1″W

Map
- Location of Mécheria Airport in Algeria

Runways
Direction	Length		Surface
Direction	m	ft	Surface
06/24	3,581	11,750	Asphalt
16/34	2,926	9,600	Asphalt
- Source: Landings.com

Cheikh Bouamama Airport (IATA: MZW, ICAO: DAAY) is a military airport located near Mécheria, Naâma Province, Algeria.

== Airlines and destinations ==
Airlines	Destinations
Air Algérie	Algiers, El Bayadh, Oran, Tindouf
Tassili Airlines	Algiers

== See also ==
- List of airports in Algeria
