= El Bayadh Airport =

El Bayadh Airport Aéroport d'El Bayadh
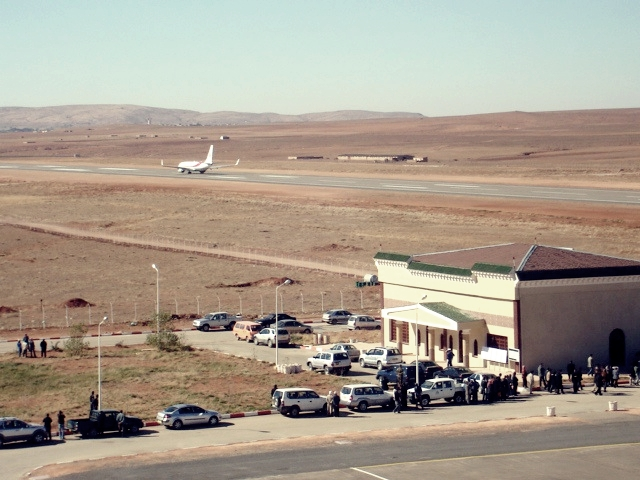
- IATA: EBH; ICAO: DAOY

Summary
- Airport type: Public
- Operator: EGSA Oran
- Serves: El Bayadh, Algeria
- Elevation AMSL: 1,366 m / 4,482 ft
- Coordinates: 33°43′15″N 1°5′29″E
- Website: http://www.egsaoran.com/index.php?rubrique=aeroports

Map
- Location of airport in Algeria

Runways
Direction	Length		Surface
Direction	m	ft	Surface
04/22	3,000	9,843	Asphalt concrete
- Sources: AIP

El Bayadh Airport (French: Aéroport d'El Bayadh (IATA: EBH, ICAO: DAOY) is a public airport serving El Bayadh, the capital of El Bayadh Province, Algeria. It is located about 10 km northwest of the city. It is operated by Établissement de Gestion des Services Aéroportuaires d’Oran.

== Infrastructure ==
=== Runway ===
The airport has one runway marked 04/22, 3000 m long and 45 m wide, with asphalt-concrete surface.

=== Terminal ===
The airport has just one terminal.

== Airlines and destinations ==
Airlines	Destinations
Air Algérie	Algiers, Mécheria, Oran

== Ground transportation ==
By taxi.
