= Socialist Forces Front rebellion in Algeria =

1960s military conflict in Algeria

- Part of the Arab Cold War
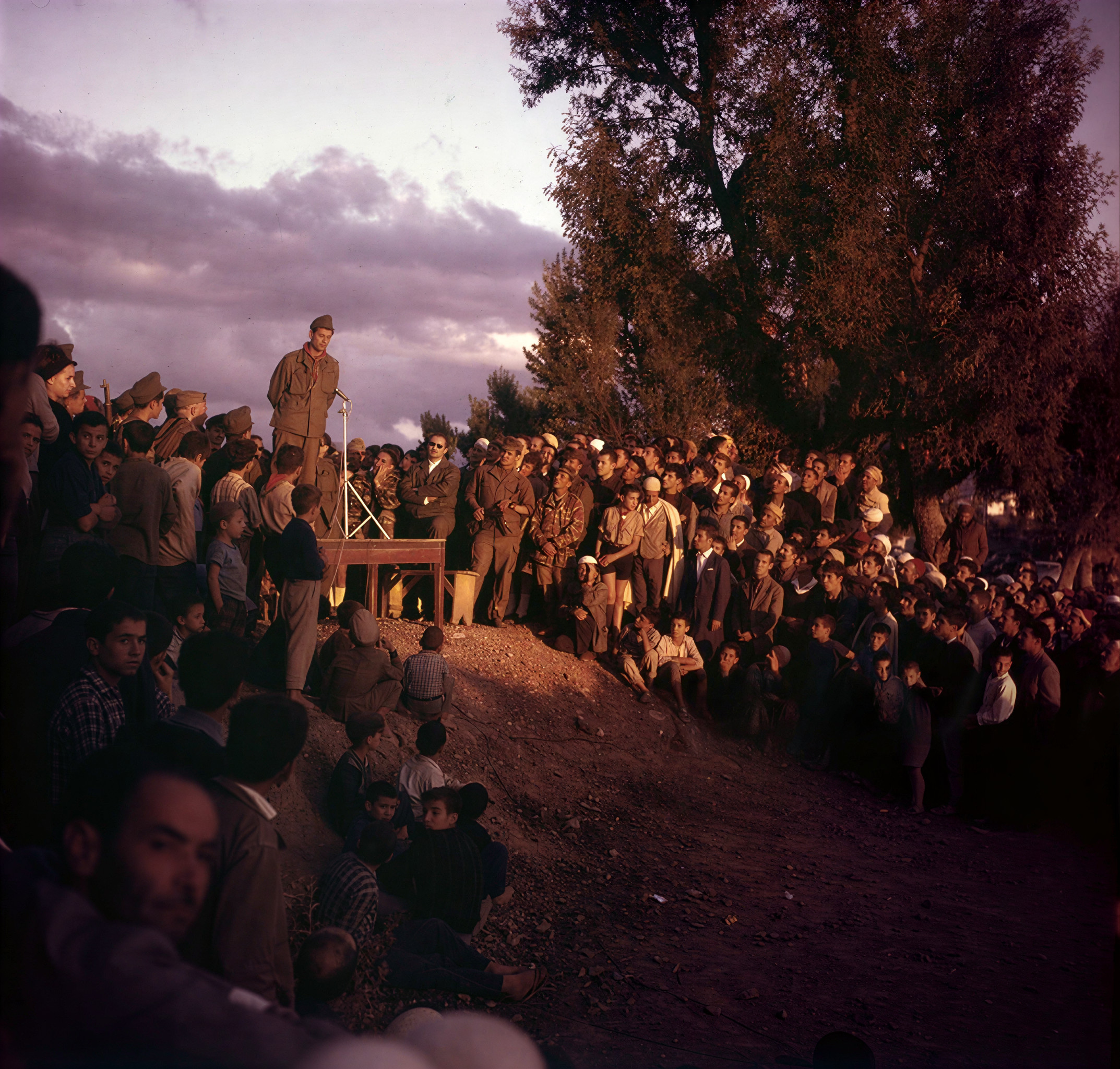
- Hocine Aït Ahmed giving a speech in Kabylia.
Date	29 September 1963 – October 1964
Location	Kabylia, Algeria
Result	Algerian government victory: Rebellion defeated; Aït Ahmed arrested

Belligerents
Algeria	Socialist Forces Front

Commanders and leaders
Ahmed Ben Bella	Hocine Aït Ahmed

Casualties and losses
Unknown	400 killed

The Socialist Forces Front rebellion in Algeria took place in the Kabylia region of northern Algeria by the Socialist Forces Front (FFS) rebelling against the Algerian government under the National Liberation Front (FLN). The rebellion was swiftly defeated by Algerian government forces and its leader Hocine Aït Ahmed was arrested.

== Background ==
The Socialist Forces Front (FFS) was formed by Hocine Aït Ahmed on 29 September 1963 in Tizi Ouzou to oppose president Ahmed Ben Bella's government. The FFS party of Aït Ahmed contested the authority of the National Liberation Front (FLN), which had purged internal dissent and ruled Algeria as a one-party state. Aït Ahmed and others considered the central government led by Ben Bella authoritarian. As the FLN promoted a unified and homogenous Arab nationalist identity, Berber languages and cultures were sidelined by the Algerian state. Another demand by the FFS was greater autonomy and cultural representation for Kabylia. The FFS grouped opponents of the regime, and a few days after its proclamation, Ben Bella sent the army into Kabylia to suppress the insurrection. Mohand Oulhadj also joined the rebellion because he believed that the mujahideen were not treated as they should have been.

== Rebellion ==
Following the party's creation, Aït Ahmed began an armed rebellion and captured a number of towns in the mostly Berber region of Kabylia. The government of Ahmed Ben Bella, supported by the Algerian military, quickly recaptured dissident towns in a mostly bloodless confrontation. The FFS rebels were not supported by the people and were pushed into the mountains by the government's army. Preferring to avoid direct conflict, the FFS and its soldiers retreated into the mountains from where they could launch guerrilla tactics. In 1964, it considered a merger with the Party of the Socialist Revolution.

In the beginning, the FFS wanted to negotiate with the government, but since no agreement was reached, the rebels took up arms and swore not to give them up as long as democratic principles and justice were not a part of the system. After Mohand Oulhadj's defection, Aït Ahmed could barely sustain the rebellion, and after the FLN congress on 16 April 1964, which reinforced the government's legitimacy, he was arrested in October 1964. As a consequence, the insurrection was a failure in 1965 because it was hugely repressed by the forces of the ALN, under Houari Boumédiène. In 1965, Aït Ahmed was sentenced to death, but later pardoned by Ben Bella. Approximately 400 deaths were counted amongst the rebels.

The conflict resulted in 10 months of armed confrontation in the region, leaving more than four hundred dead, and most of the FLN leaders from Kabylia and some eastern provinces either executed or forced into exile. Hocine Aït Ahmed escaped prison in 1966 and fled to Switzerland.
