= Touat-Cheikh Sidi Mohamed Belkebir Airport =

Touat-Cheikh Sidi Mohamed Belkebir Airport مطار أدرار – توات الشيخ سيدي محمد بن لكبير (Arabic)
- IATA: AZR; ICAO: DAUA

Summary
- Airport type: Public
- Operator: EGSA ORAN
- Serves: Adrar, Algeria
- Elevation AMSL: 280 m (920 ft)
- Coordinates: 27°50′20″N 0°11′10″W

Map
- Location of airport in Algeria

Runways
| Direction | Length | | Surface |
| Direction | m | ft | Surface |
|---|---|---|---|
| 04/22 | 3,000 | 9,843 | Asphalt |

Statistics (2013)
- Passengers: 92,197
- Passenger change 12–13: ▲71.4%
- Aircraft movements: 2,047
- Movements change 12–13: ▲55.2%
- Sources: Algerian AIP, DAFIF Landings.com, ACI's 2013 World Airport Traffic Report.

Touat-Cheikh Sidi Mohamed Belkebir Airport (IATA: AZR, ICAO: DAUA) is a public airport located 6 nm (11 km) southeast of Adrar, the capital of the Adrar province (wilaya) in Algeria.

== History ==
Since 1922, Adrar was served by the Adrar Aerodrome, located a kilometre northeast of the commune. In 1978, construction of a replacement airport began southeast of Adrar, and works were completed by the end of 1980. It had a new 3,000 x 45 metre runway designated 04/22, a taxiway, and an apron. A Boeing 737 test flight was conducted in 1981, after which the runway was strengthened before the airport entered service. On 15 January 1983, the new Adrar-Touat Airpor officially replaced Adrar Aerodrome, and the new aerodrome was inaugurated shortly thereafter. The old Adrar Aerodrome was superseded and closed afterwards.

== Facilities ==
The airport resides at an elevation of 280 metres (919 ft) above mean sea level. It has one runway designated 04/22 with an asphalt surface measuring 3,000 by 60 metres (9,843 ft × 197 ft).

== Airlines and destinations ==
| Airlines | Destinations |
|---|---|
| Air Algérie | Algiers, Bordj Badji Mokhtar, Constantine, In Salah, Oran, Ouargla, Tamanrasset |
| Tassili Airlines | Algiers, Oran |

== Statistics ==
Traffic by calendar year. Official ACI Statistics
| | Pass- engers | Change from previous year | Aircraft opera- tions | Change from previous year | Cargo (metric tons) | Change from previous year |
|---|---|---|---|---|---|---|
| 2005 | 46,853 | ▼8.23% | 2,502 | ▲45.21% | 28 | ▼46.15% |
| 2006 | 40,439 | ▼13.69% | 2,593 | ▲3.68% | 44 | ▲57.14% |
| 2007 | 46,817 | ▲15.77% | 3,582 | ▲38.09% | 62 | ▲40.91% |
| 2008 | N.A. | N.A. | N.A. | N.A. | N.A. | N.A. |
| 2009 | N.A. | N.A. | N.A. | N.A. | N.A. | N.A. |
| 2010 | 10,483 | N.A. | 328 | N.A. | 14 | N.A. |
| 2011 | 41,418 | ▲295.10% | 1,102 | ▲235.98% | 64 | ▲357.14% |
| 2012 | 53,797 | ▲29.89% | 1,320 | ▲19.78% | 101 | ▲57.81% |
| 2013 | 92,197 | ▲71.38% | 2,048 | ▲55.15% | 70 | ▼30.69% |
Source: Airports Council International. World Airport Traffic Reports (Years 2005, 2006, 2007, 2009, 2011, 2012, and 2013)
