= Gulf airlines =

Airlines in MENA states

Gulf airlines are airlines based in countries around the Persian Gulf. Since the establishment of especially Emirates, Qatar Airways, and Etihad Airways, the three airports in Dubai, Doha, and Abu Dhabi, have emerged as hubs and competitors to established airlines in Europe, North America, and Asia. Particularly on routes from Europe to East Asia, Southeast Asia, and Australia, as well as from North America to Asia, new and often attractive offers for air travelers have been introduced. These airlines are characterized by improved onboard services and lower ticket prices.

The offerings of Gulf airlines have significantly reduced the available capacities, especially for major aviation companies like Lufthansa, International Airlines Group, and Air France–KLM in Europe, as well as for Singapore Airlines, Thai Airways, and Malaysia Airlines in Asia, between both continents. In contrast, Gulf airlines have experienced substantial growth over the past two decades. Meanwhile, the competition for passengers has also extended to North America.

For example, in recent years, the German airline Lufthansa had to permanently remove around 20 flight destinations in the Near and Far East from its offerings due to tougher competition towards Asia. Some of the affected destinations include Karachi, Tashkent, Hyderabad, Kolkata, Busan, Guangzhou, Jakarta, Manila, Kuala Lumpur, Denpasar, and Abu Dhabi.

In addition, Istanbul with Turkish Airlines and Addis Ababa with Ethiopian Airlines have also established themselves as key players near the hubs of Gulf airlines.

== History ==
The states around the Persian Gulf have chosen to establish new aviation hubs and operate their own airlines as part of their search for alternative business models, considering the likely decline in the long run of fossil fuel extraction (oil and natural gas), which has been a significant source of revenue for them. Furthermore, the airlines benefit from their geographically advantageous location between Europe and Asia, two of the world's largest economic regions.

== Policy ==
The rapid development of Gulf airlines with new hub functions has also prompted the governments in the home countries of affected competing airlines to take action. Particularly in shaping bilateral aviation agreements or defining common competition conditions (often under the term "level playing field"), efforts are made to both delineate the markets and align the conditions.

Western airlines frequently cite the following as hindrances to market access:

- Unequal market opportunities
- Unequal labor rights
- Suspicions of subsidies for Gulf airlines
- Potential dependence on aviation authorities in the Persian Gulf

However, the Gulf airlines themselves have refuted or not confirmed these points.

The Qatar blockade in 2017 resulted in reduced growth for the Gulf airlines, with Qatar Airways in particular experiencing significant losses.
