= Henri Lorillot =

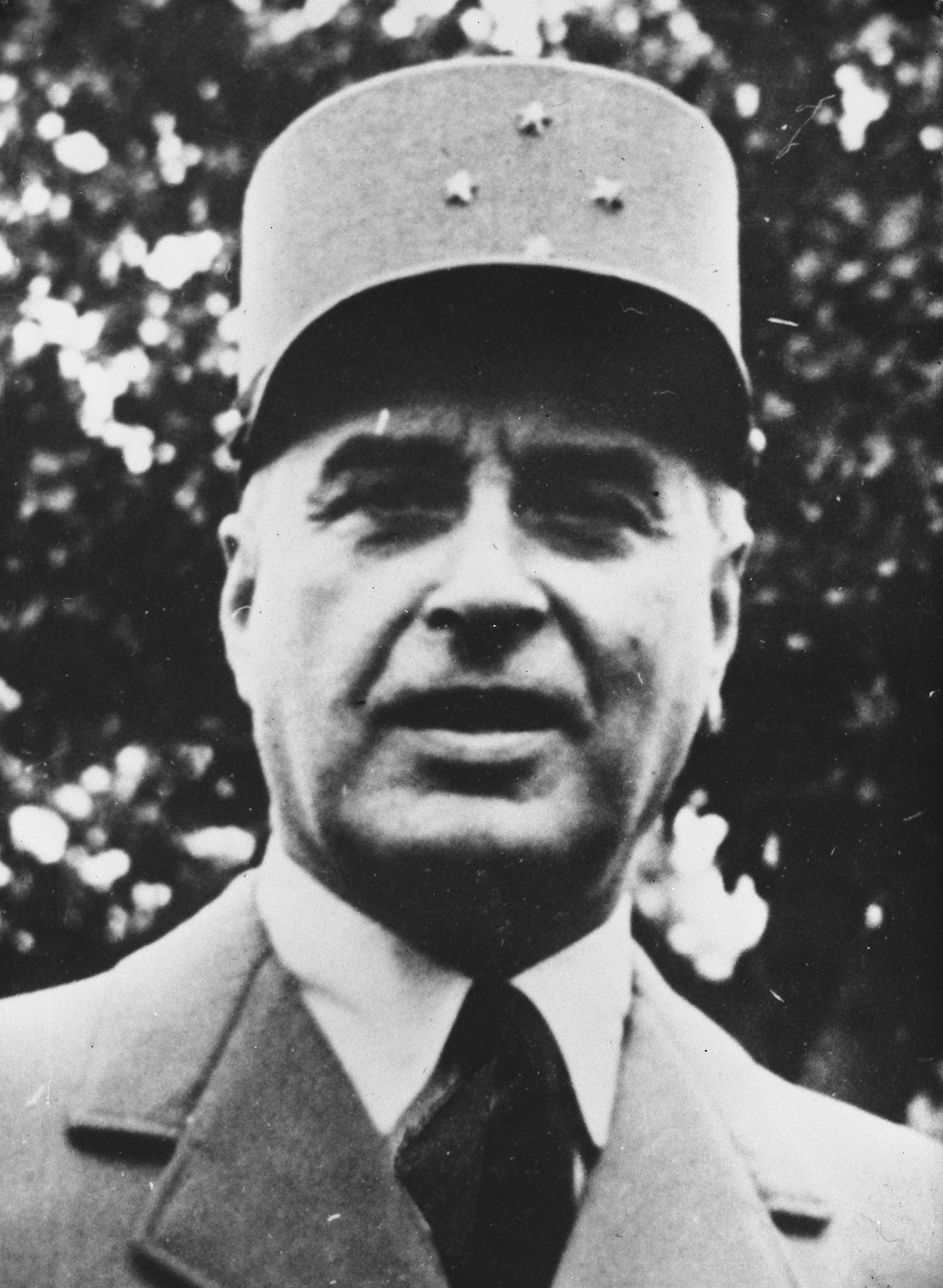
- General Lorillot
- Born: August 18, 1901; Bourges, France
- Died: June 3, 1985 (aged 83)
- Military career
- Allegiance: France
- Service years: 1919–1985
- Conflicts: Algerian War
- Awards: Grand Cross of the Legion of Honour

Henri Lorillot (1901–1985) was a Commander of France's ground army.

== Biography ==
Lorillot was trained at the Saint-Cyr Military Academy in the 105th class (1919-1921), the "Rhine Guard Class". He then pursued his career in the Foreign Legion.

During the Algerian War , in 1955, he was called to command the military region of Algiers.

In 1956, he was appointed Chief of Staff of the Army. and promoted to the rank of General of the Army the following year.

== Awards ==

Grand Cross of the Legion of Honour
