= Takhamalt Airport =

- IATA: VVZ; ICAO: DAAP

Summary
- Airport type: Public
- Operator: EGSA
- Serves: Illizi, Algeria
- Elevation AMSL: 542 m (1,778 ft)
- Coordinates: 26°43′25″N 8°37′20″E

Map
- Location of airport in Algeria

Runways
Direction	Length		Surface
Direction	m	ft	Surface
09/27	3,000	9,843	Asphalt
- Sources: World Aero Data, Algerian AIP Landings.com

Takhamalt Airport (IATA: VVZ, ICAO: DAAP), also known as Illizi Airport, is an airport serving Illizi, Algeria. It is 27 kilometres (17 mi) northeast of the city.
