= Languages of Libya =

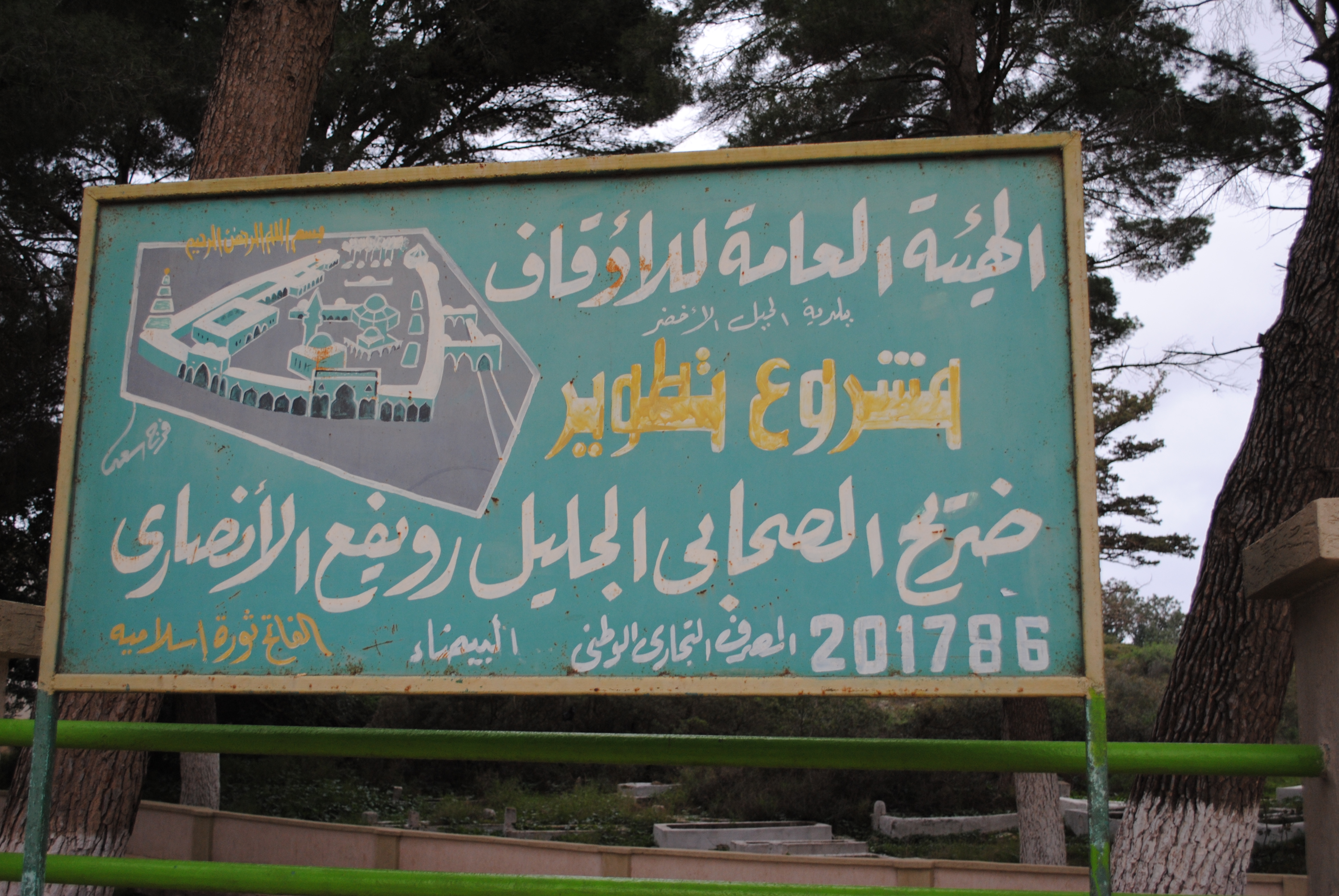
- Arabic sign at the grave of Sahabi Ruwaifa Al-Ansari
- Official: Standard Arabic
- Vernacular: Libyan Arabic, other varieties of Arabic
- Minority: various Berber languages, Domari, Tedaga, Turkish, Greek
- Foreign: Italian, English, French
- Signed: Libyan Sign Language
- Keyboard layout: Arabic keyboard

Ethnolinguistic map of Libya

The official language of Libya is Modern Standard Arabic. Most residents speak one of the varieties of Arabic as a first language, most prominently Libyan Arabic, but also Egyptian Arabic and Tunisian Arabic.

== Major language ==
=== Arabic ===
The official language of Libya is Arabic. The local Libyan Arabic variety is the common spoken vernacular.

== Minority languages ==
Berber

Various Berber languages are also spoken, including Tamahaq, Ghadamès, Nafusi, Zuwara, Yefren, Fezzan, Kufra and Awjilah. Both Berber and Arabic languages belong to the wider Afroasiatic family.

The most significant berber speaking group, the Nafusi, is concentrated in the Tripolitanian region. Berber languages are also spoken in some cases, including Ghadamès, Awjilah, and formerly Sawknah. Tamahaq is spoken by the Tuareg people.

Libya's former Head of State Muammar Gaddafi denied the existence of Berbers as a separate ethnicity, and called Berbers a "product of colonialism" created by the West to divide Libya. The Berber language was not recognized or taught in schools, and for years it was forbidden in Libya to give children Berber names.

During the First Libyan Civil War, the National Transitional Council broadcast in Tamazight for two hours a day.

Domari

The Domari, an Indo-Iranian language spoken by the Dom people (ca. 33,000 speakers).

Tedega

Tedaga, a Saharan language is spoken by the previously nomadic Teda people. The exact number of Teda is unknown.

Turkish

A minority of Turkish speakers can be found in Libya, most of them belonging to the Kouloughli ethnicity that inhabit cities like Tripoli, Benghazi, and Misrata.

Greek

The Greek language is spoken by an unknown number of speakers in Cyrenaica by some of the descendants of Greek Muslims (locally called Gritlis) who settled in the region at the end of the 19th century.

Coptic

The Coptic language is spoken as a Liturgical Language by the Coptic community in Libya.

== Foreign languages ==
Italian was introduced during the period of Italian colonization and remains spoken in the Italian Libyan community. As the main language of government, education, and commerce during the colonial period, it retained some influence after independence, chiefly in urban areas. However, the language drastically diminished with the rise of Muammar Gaddafi and the 1970 expulsion of Italians from Libya. Since then, Italian has been mostly spoken by a small number of educated elderly populations and those involved in business with Italy. In the 2020s, the language was re-introduced into the public school curriculum as an elective language as part of efforts to offer more language options for Libyan students and foster stronger bilateral ties in trade, politics, and cultural exchange with Italy.

English is a notable foreign language in business and for economical purposes and also spoken by the young generation. English and Italian are used in commerce, due to the large influx of foreigners.

After the Libyan Civil War and the help coming from France, the French language gained popularity among the younger generations. French authorities expressed their interest to encourage the teaching of French in Libya.
