= Demographics of Libya =

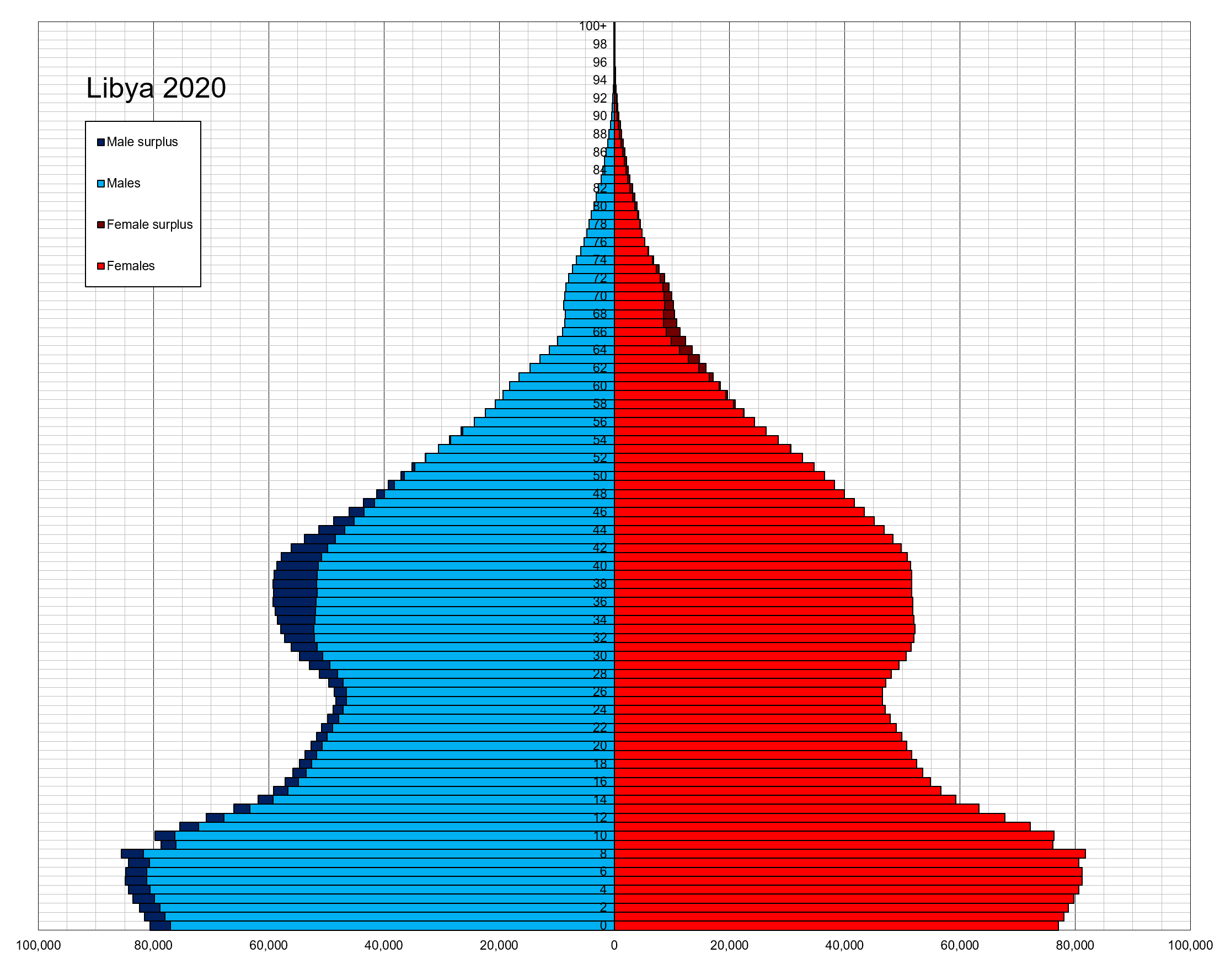
- Population pyramid of Libya in 2020
- Population: 7,137,931 (2022 est.)
- Growth rate: 1.65% (2022 est.)
- Birth rate: 16.1 births/1,000 population (2025 est.)
- Death rate: 5.6 deaths/1,000 population (2025 est.)
- Life expectancy: 73.29 years
  - male: 70.27 years
  - female: 76.11 years
- Fertility rate: 2.25 children born/woman (2025 est.)
- Infant mortality: 5.22 deaths/1,000 live births
- Net migration rate: 1.61 migrant(s)/1,000 population
- Immigrant share: 12.2% (2024)

Sex ratio
- Total: 1.04 male(s)/female (2022 est.)
- At birth: 1.05 male(s)/female

Nationality
- Nationality: Libyans
- Major ethnic: Arabs (92%)
- Minor ethnic: Berbers (5%); Others (3%)

Language
- Official: Arabic

Libyans
ليبيون (Libiūn)

Total population
- c. 8 million

Regions with significant populations
- Libya; 7,420,000 (1-1-2025 UN est.)
- Tunisia: 300,000 (2018)
- Algeria: 250,900 (2018)
- Egypt: 200,000 (2016)
- Morocco: 55,000 (2015)
- Italy: 54,500 (2022)
- Israel: 50,600 (2019)
- China: 25,000
- Turkey: 21,677 (2022)
- Malaysia: 15,000 (2019)
- United Kingdom: 14,000
- Germany: 13,827
- Canada: 13,545
- United States: 11,979 (2000)
- France: 11,000 (2021)
- Malta: 5,622 (2017)
- Brazil: 1,290 (2025)
- South Africa: 1,000 (2019)
- Saudi Arabia: 800
- Bahrain: 350

Languages
- Majority: Arabic (Libyan Arabic); Minority: Berber (Awjila, Nafusi, Tamasheq), Teda; Foreign: Italian, Turkish, English, Greek

Religion
- Majority: Sunni Islam; Minority: Ibadi Islam and Christianity

Libya is a country on the Mediterranean coast of North Africa, to the west of and adjacent to Egypt. Tripoli is the capital of the country and is the city with the largest population. Benghazi is Libya's second largest city. All demographics figures are from the United Nations Demographic Yearbooks, unless otherwise indicated.

== History ==
Historically known as Berber, over the centuries, Libya has been occupied by the Egyptians, Assyrians, Phoenicians, Greeks, Romans, Arabs, Turks, and Italians. The Phoenicians had a big impact on Libya: many of the coastal towns and cities of Libya were founded by the Phoenicians as trade outposts within the southern Mediterranean coast in order to facilitate the Phoenician business activities in the area.

Starting in the 8th century BCE, Libya was under the rule of the Phoenician Carthage. After the Romans defeated Carthage in the Third Punic War, Libya became a Roman province under the name of Tripolitania until the 7th century CE, when Libya was conquered by the Arab Muslims as part of the Arab conquest of North Africa: Arab migrations to the region began since then.

In the 11th century, major migrations of Banu Hilal and Banu Sulaym from the Arabian Peninsula to Libya began with other nomadic tribes from Eastern Arabia. Centuries after that, the Ottoman Empire conquered Libya in 1551. It remained in control of its territory until 1911, when the country was conquered by Italy. In the 18th century, Libya was used as the base for various pirates.

The Awlad Sulayman, an Arab group from present-day Libya, dominated northern Lake Chad in the 19th century. Since the Middle Ages, the populations of this region have shared close political, economic, and social ties maintained by the mobility specific to the nomadic way of life. These relationships – fluid due to the difficulties of surviving in this difficult environment – have always been structured through conflict and cooperation, both of which produced rapidly changing alliances. In the middle of the 18th century, the Awlad Sulayman carved out a vast area of influence for themselves in Sirte and Fezzan by force of arms and by their alliances with neighboring peoples and the Lybian administration.

Defeated by the Ottoman administration in Tripoli at the end of the 1830s, the survivors of the Awlad Sulayman took refuge in the Lake Chad basin where they reconstituted the conditions for their success in Libya; they controlled trans-Saharan trade and maintained their links with Libyan society. Despite the limits imposed on their actions by the French colonization of Chad and the Italian colonization of Libya, the Awlad Sulayman retained regional influence during colonial times and appear to maintain it into the modern day.

In the Second World War, Libya was one of the main battlegrounds of North Africa. During the war, the territory was under an Anglo-French military government until it was overrun by the Axis powers, who were then defeated by the Allies in 1943.

In 1951, the country was granted independence by the United Nations, being governed by King Idris. In 1969, a military coup led by Muammar Gaddafi resulted in the overthrow of King Idris I. Gaddafi then established an anti-Western leadership. In 1970, Gaddafi ordered all British and American military bases closed.

The Libyan population has increased rapidly after 1969: they numbered 2 million in 1968, and 5 million in 2006. Many migrant workers also came to Libya since 1969. Among the workers were construction workers and laborers from Tunisia, teachers and laborers from Egypt, teachers from Palestine, and doctors and nurses from Yugoslavia and Bulgaria. 1,000,000 workers, mainly from other neighboring African countries like Sudan, Niger, Chad and Mali, migrated to Libya in the 1990s, after changes were made to Libya's Pan-African policies.

Gaddafi used money from the sale of oil to improve the living conditions of the population and to assist Palestinian guerrillas in their fight against the Israelis. In 1979, Libya fought in Uganda to assist the government of Idi Amin in the Ugandan Civil War, and in 1981, fought in the Libyan-Chadian War. Libya had occupied the Aozou Strip; however, in 1990 the International Court of Justice submitted the case and allowed the full recuperation of the territory to Chad.

In September 2008, Italy and Libya signed a memorandum by which Italy would pay $5 billion over the next 20 years to compensate Libya for its dominion over Libya for its reign of 30 years.

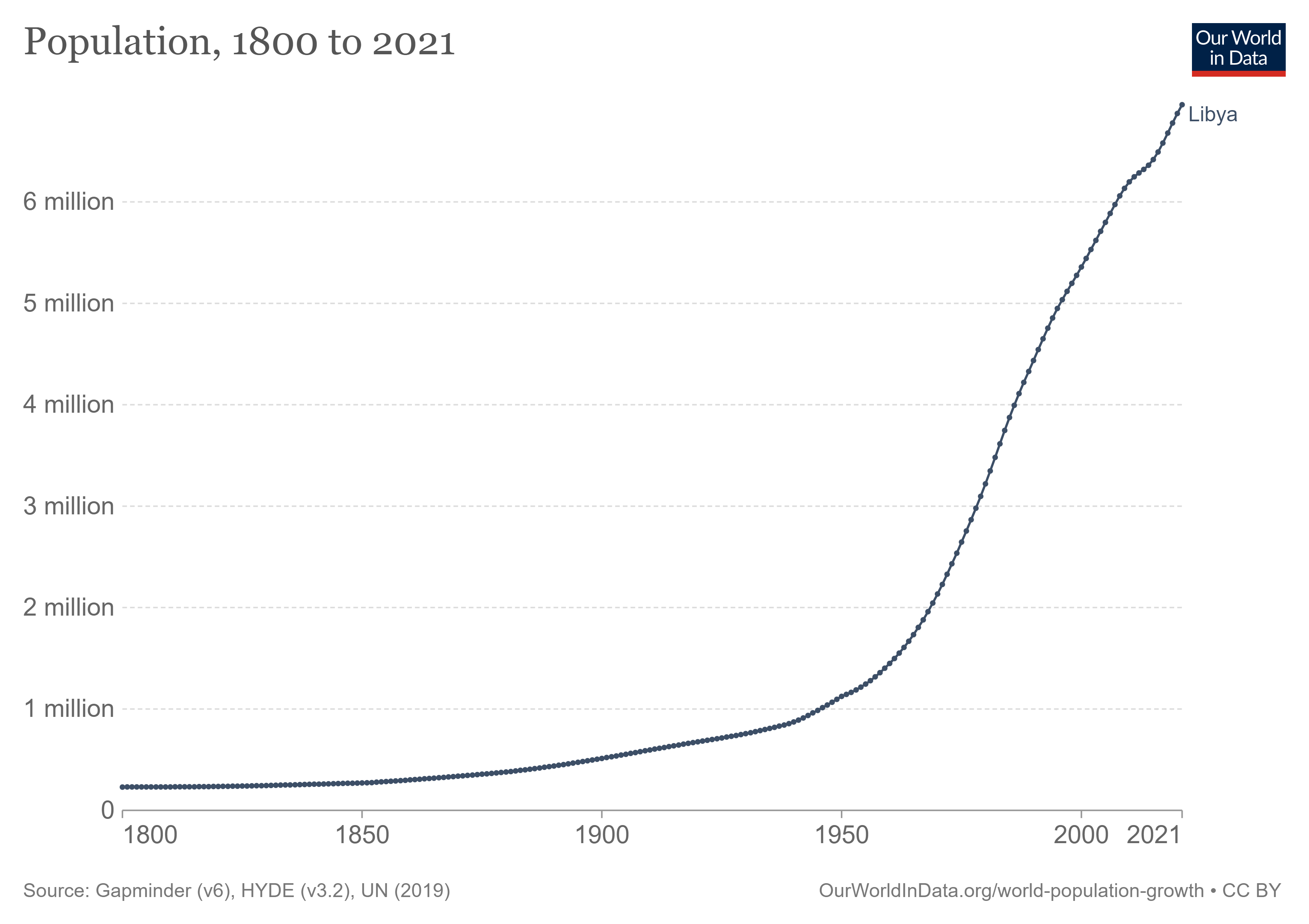
Demographics of Libya, Data of Our World in Data, year 2021; Number of inhabitants in millions.

In 2011, the country was swept by the Libyan Civil War, which broke out between the Anti-Gaddafi rebels and the Pro-Gaddafi government, culminating in the death and overthrow of Gaddafi. Nevertheless, Libya continues to generate problems within the area and beyond, greatly affecting its population and the migrant route to Europe.

Under Gaddhafi, the country had oil income and a level of stability, contributing to the fall of birthrates to 2.56 by 2010. However, with instability, the government in Libya announced a population of 7.7 million as of Oct 2022, indicating a substantial population boom due to rising birthrates and/or migration.

== Population ==
Historical population
| Year | Pop. | ±% |
|---|---|---|
| 1954 | 1,088,873 | — |
| 1964 | 1,564,369 | +43.7% |
| 1973 | 2,249,237 | +43.8% |
| 1984 | 3,642,576 | +61.9% |
| 1995 | 4,799,065 | +31.7% |
| 2006 | 5,657,692 | +17.9% |
Source: Bureau of Statistics and Census Libya

Libya has a small population residing in a large land area. Population density is about 50 persons per km^{2} (130/sq. mi.) in the two northern regions of Tripolitania and Cyrenaica, but falls to less than one person per km^{2} (2.7/sq. mi.) elsewhere. Ninety percent of the people live in less than ten percent of the area, primarily along the coast. About 90 percent of the population is urban, mostly concentrated in the four largest cities, Tripoli, Benghazi, Misrata, and Bayda. As of 2019, twenty-eight percent of the population is estimated to be under the age of 15, but this proportion has decreased considerably during the past decades. The majority of the population of Libya is composed of Arabs.

Eight population censuses have been carried out in Libya, the first in 1931 and the most recent one in 2006. The population multiplied sixfold between 1931 and 2006.

| Year | Males (thousands) | Females (thousands) | Total population (thousands) | Average annual growth rate (%) |
|---|---|---|---|---|
| 1931 | | | 704 | |
| 1936 | 463 | 386 | 849 | 3.8 |
| 1954 | 564 | 524 | 1,089 | 1.4 |
| 1964 (July 31) | 813 | 751 | 1,564 | 3.7 |
| 1973 (July 31) | 1,192 | 1,057 | 2,249 | 4.1 |
| 1984 (July 31) | 1,954 | 1,689 | 3,643 | 4.5 |
| 1995 (August 11) | 2,237 | 2,168 | 4,405 | 1.7 |
| 2006 (April 15) | 2,934 | 2,723 | 5,658 | 2.3 |

== Age distribution ==
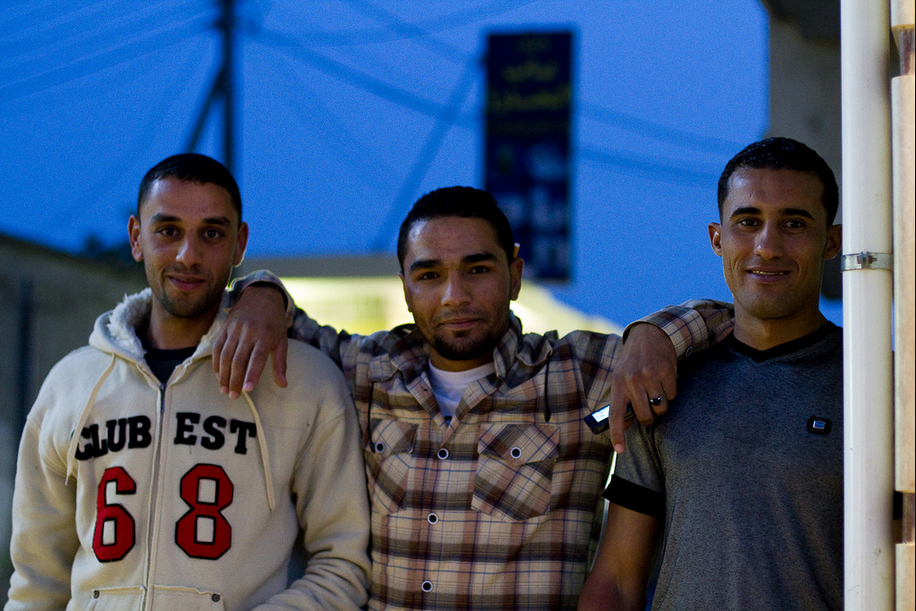
Libyan young men in Bayda. In 2019, about 28 % of the population was under the age of 15.

| Year | Total population ( × 1000) | Population in age bracket | | |
| Year | Total population ( × 1000) | aged 0–14 | aged 15–64 | aged 65+ |
|---|---|---|---|---|
| 1950 | 1,029 | 41.9% | 53.4% | 4.7% |
| 1955 | 1,126 | 43.0% | 52.7% | 4.3% |
| 1960 | 1,349 | 43.3% | 52.7% | 4.0% |
| 1965 | 1,623 | 43.4% | 53.0% | 3.6% |
| 1970 | 1,994 | 45.2% | 52.1% | 2.7% |
| 1975 | 2,466 | 46.5% | 51.3% | 2.2% |
| 1980 | 3,063 | 47.0% | 50.7% | 2.2% |
| 1985 | 3,850 | 47.3% | 50.5% | 2.3% |
| 1990 | 4,334 | 43.5% | 53.9% | 2.6% |
| 1995 | 4,775 | 38.3% | 58.8% | 2.9% |
| 2000 | 5,231 | 32.4% | 64.2% | 3.4% |
| 2005 | 5,770 | 30.6% | 65.6% | 3.8% |
| 2010 | 6,355 | 30.4% | 65.3% | 4.3% |

Population Estimates by Sex and Age Group (1.VII.2015) (Data refers to Libyan nationals only.):

| Age group | Male | Female | Total | % |
|---|---|---|---|---|
| Total | 3 129 026 | 3 033 221 | 6 162 247 | 100 |
| 0–4 | 316 497 | 299 059 | 615 556 | 9.99 |
| 5–9 | 297 303 | 280 602 | 577 905 | 9.38 |
| 10–14 | 284 318 | 270 831 | 555 149 | 9.01 |
| 15–19 | 268 106 | 257 009 | 525 115 | 8.52 |
| 20–24 | 278 875 | 267 533 | 546 408 | 8.87 |
| 25–29 | 289 113 | 282 117 | 571 230 | 9.27 |
| 30–34 | 287 480 | 281 354 | 568 834 | 9.23 |
| 35–39 | 279 699 | 271 907 | 551 606 | 8.95 |
| 40–44 | 235 088 | 231 285 | 466 373 | 7.57 |
| 45–49 | 180 029 | 180 796 | 360 825 | 5.86 |
| 50–54 | 126 799 | 126 848 | 253 647 | 4.12 |
| 55–59 | 87 135 | 86 625 | 173 760 | 2.82 |
| 60–64 | 56 199 | 59 834 | 116 033 | 1.89 |
| 65–69 | 51 782 | 50 863 | 102 645 | 1.67 |
| 70–74 | 38 750 | 33 736 | 72 486 | 1.18 |
| 75-79 | 26 942 | 25 616 | 52 558 | 0.85 |
| 80-84 | 15 038 | 15 233 | 30 271 | 0.49 |
| 85+ | 9 873 | 11 973 | 21 846 | 0.35 |
| Age group | Male | Female | Total | Percent |
| 0–14 | 898 118 | 850 492 | 1 748 610 | 28.38 |
| 15–64 | 2 088 523 | 2 045 308 | 4 133 831 | 67.08 |
| 65+ | 142 385 | 137 421 | 279 806 | 4.54 |

View source data.
View source data.
View source data.
View source data.
View source data.

== Vital statistics ==
During the past 60 years, the demographic situation of Libya changed considerably. Since the 1950s, life expectancy increased steadily and the infant mortality rates decreased. Half of the population was estimated to not reach 25 in 1950, while in 2025 only 2.6% of the population is not expected to reach 25.

The fertility rates remained high until the 1980s (the number of births tripled between 1950–55 and 1980–85), so population growth was very high for three decades. However, after 1985, a fast decrease in fertility was observed from over 7 children per woman in the beginning of the 1980s to less than 3 in 2005–2010. Because of this decrease in fertility, the population growth slowed down, and the proportion of Libyans under the age of 15 also decreased from 45% in 1985 to 29% in 2010. As of the 2020s, the UN projects that the fertility rate will continue to fall but remain slightly above the replacement level (2.10), in a similar trend to the rest of the world, but well below the average for the African continent. Population growth remains around 1% due to population momentum, close to the growth rate of the early 1950s despite the large decrease in fertility due to the concurrent decline in the youth mortality rate.

Notable events in demography of Libya:

- 2011 – Libyan civil war

=== UN estimates ===
| Period | Population (thousands) | Live births (thousands) | Deaths (thousands) | Natural change (thousands) | CBR (Note: CBR = crude birth rate (per 1000); CDR = crude death rate (per 1000); NC = natural change (per 1000); TFR = total fertility rate (number of children per woman); IMR = infant mortality rate per 1000 births) | CDR | NC | Crude migration rate (per 1000) | TFR | IMR | Life expectancy (years) |
|---|---|---|---|---|---|---|---|---|---|---|---|
| 1950 | 1 131 | 53 | 36 | 17 | 47.0 | 31.8 | 15.2 | | 6.93 | 232.8 | 33.59 |
| 1951 | 1 143 | 54 | 36 | 17 | 47.1 | 31.8 | 15.3 | -4.7 | 6.94 | 233.9 | 33.55 |
| 1952 | 1 158 | 55 | 37 | 18 | 47.3 | 32.1 | 15.2 | -2.1 | 6.95 | 235.4 | 33.31 |
| 1953 | 1 176 | 56 | 38 | 19 | 47.9 | 32.0 | 15.9 | -0.4 | 7.03 | 235.3 | 33.47 |
| 1954 | 1 198 | 58 | 38 | 20 | 48.4 | 31.8 | 16.6 | 2.1 | 7.08 | 233.5 | 33.78 |
| 1955 | 1 226 | 60 | 38 | 21 | 48.9 | 31.4 | 17.6 | 5.8 | 7.14 | 230.1 | 34.29 |
| 1956 | 1 259 | 62 | 38 | 24 | 49.4 | 30.7 | 18.8 | 8.1 | 7.20 | 225.1 | 35.12 |
| 1957 | 1 296 | 64 | 38 | 26 | 49.9 | 29.8 | 20.1 | 9.3 | 7.26 | 218.5 | 36.08 |
| 1958 | 1 336 | 67 | 38 | 29 | 50.2 | 28.7 | 21.5 | 9.4 | 7.31 | 210.3 | 37.28 |
| 1959 | 1 379 | 69 | 38 | 31 | 50.3 | 27.4 | 22.9 | 9.3 | 7.33 | 200.9 | 38.75 |
| 1960 | 1 427 | 72 | 37 | 35 | 50.5 | 26.0 | 24.5 | 10.3 | 7.37 | 190.4 | 40.27 |
| 1961 | 1 479 | 75 | 36 | 39 | 50.7 | 24.4 | 26.3 | 10.1 | 7.45 | 179.3 | 42.06 |
| 1962 | 1 535 | 78 | 35 | 43 | 51.1 | 22.9 | 28.2 | 9.7 | 7.55 | 168.1 | 43.84 |
| 1963 | 1 595 | 82 | 34 | 48 | 51.7 | 21.7 | 30.0 | 9.1 | 7.70 | 157.5 | 45.31 |
| 1964 | 1 652 | 86 | 33 | 52 | 52.0 | 20.2 | 31.8 | 3.9 | 7.82 | 147.0 | 47.14 |
| 1965 | 1 700 | 89 | 32 | 56 | 51.9 | 19.0 | 32.9 | -3.8 | 7.91 | 137.8 | 48.66 |
| 1966 | 1 740 | 90 | 31 | 58 | 51.2 | 17.8 | 33.3 | -9.8 | 7.99 | 129.5 | 50.13 |
| 1967 | 1 779 | 89 | 30 | 59 | 49.9 | 16.8 | 33.1 | -10.7 | 8.02 | 121.5 | 51.39 |
| 1968 | 1 819 | 89 | 29 | 60 | 48.6 | 15.6 | 33.0 | -10.5 | 8.05 | 113.8 | 52.71 |
| 1969 | 1 863 | 89 | 27 | 62 | 47.5 | 14.5 | 33.0 | -8.8 | 8.08 | 106.7 | 54.00 |
| 1970 | 1 909 | 89 | 26 | 63 | 46.4 | 13.5 | 32.9 | -8.2 | 8.10 | 99.8 | 55.19 |
| 1971 | 1 958 | 89 | 25 | 65 | 45.5 | 12.6 | 32.9 | -7.2 | 8.13 | 93.4 | 56.34 |
| 1972 | 2 013 | 89 | 24 | 66 | 44.3 | 11.7 | 32.6 | -4.5 | 8.10 | 87.5 | 57.49 |
| 1973 | 2 084 | 90 | 23 | 67 | 43.4 | 11.0 | 32.4 | 2.9 | 8.07 | 82.1 | 58.29 |
| 1974 | 2 179 | 94 | 22 | 72 | 43.3 | 10.1 | 33.2 | 12.4 | 8.02 | 77.2 | 59.59 |
| 1975 | 2 292 | 97 | 21 | 75 | 42.6 | 9.4 | 33.2 | 18.7 | 7.96 | 72.6 | 60.81 |
| 1976 | 2 414 | 100 | 21 | 80 | 41.9 | 8.6 | 33.2 | 20.0 | 7.90 | 68.6 | 62.06 |
| 1977 | 2 542 | 104 | 21 | 83 | 41.3 | 8.2 | 33.1 | 19.9 | 7.82 | 64.9 | 62.79 |
| 1978 | 2 676 | 108 | 20 | 88 | 40.7 | 7.7 | 33.0 | 19.7 | 7.71 | 61.6 | 63.57 |
| 1979 | 2 817 | 112 | 20 | 92 | 40.1 | 7.3 | 32.9 | 19.8 | 7.58 | 58.6 | 64.26 |
| 1980 | 2 963 | 113 | 20 | 93 | 38.5 | 6.9 | 31.7 | 20.1 | 7.22 | 55.8 | 64.89 |
| 1981 | 3 112 | 115 | 20 | 94 | 37.1 | 6.5 | 30.6 | 19.7 | 7.02 | 53.2 | 65.36 |
| 1982 | 3 265 | 118 | 20 | 97 | 36.3 | 6.3 | 30.1 | 19.1 | 6.83 | 50.8 | 65.81 |
| 1983 | 3 424 | 121 | 20 | 100 | 35.6 | 6.0 | 29.6 | 19.1 | 6.63 | 48.5 | 66.41 |
| 1984 | 3 565 | 124 | 20 | 103 | 34.8 | 5.7 | 29.1 | 12.1 | 6.44 | 46.3 | 66.87 |
| 1985 | 3 684 | 126 | 20 | 106 | 34.4 | 5.5 | 28.8 | 4.6 | 6.24 | 44.2 | 67.29 |
| 1986 | 3 800 | 128 | 20 | 108 | 33.7 | 5.3 | 28.4 | 3.1 | 6.02 | 42.0 | 67.77 |
| 1987 | 3 912 | 128 | 20 | 108 | 32.9 | 5.1 | 27.7 | 1.8 | 5.79 | 40.0 | 68.20 |
| 1988 | 4 022 | 128 | 20 | 108 | 31.9 | 5.0 | 26.9 | 1.2 | 5.53 | 38.1 | 68.62 |
| 1989 | 4 130 | 127 | 20 | 107 | 30.7 | 4.8 | 25.9 | 1.0 | 5.26 | 36.2 | 68.99 |
| 1990 | 4 237 | 125 | 20 | 105 | 29.5 | 4.7 | 24.8 | 1.1 | 4.78 | 34.4 | 69.42 |
| 1991 | 4 342 | 123 | 20 | 103 | 28.3 | 4.5 | 23.7 | 1.1 | 4.46 | 32.7 | 69.82 |
| 1992 | 4 445 | 120 | 20 | 101 | 27.1 | 4.4 | 22.7 | 1.0 | 4.16 | 31.3 | 70.23 |
| 1993 | 4 545 | 118 | 20 | 98 | 25.9 | 4.3 | 21.6 | 0.9 | 3.88 | 29.9 | 70.42 |
| 1994 | 4 641 | 116 | 20 | 96 | 24.9 | 4.3 | 20.7 | 0.4 | 3.65 | 28.7 | 70.71 |
| 1995 | 4 733 | 114 | 20 | 94 | 24.1 | 4.2 | 20.0 | -0.2 | 3.44 | 27.7 | 71.09 |
| 1996 | 4 820 | 113 | 20 | 93 | 23.5 | 4.2 | 19.3 | -0.9 | 3.26 | 26.7 | 71.28 |
| 1997 | 4 902 | 112 | 21 | 91 | 22.8 | 4.3 | 18.5 | -1.5 | 3.13 | 25.8 | 71.13 |
| 1998 | 4 981 | 111 | 22 | 89 | 22.2 | 4.4 | 17.8 | -1.7 | 3.04 | 25.1 | 71.08 |
| 1999 | 5 058 | 110 | 23 | 87 | 21.6 | 4.5 | 17.2 | -1.7 | 2.97 | 24.3 | 71.06 |
| 2000 | 5 155 | 109 | 24 | 85 | 21.2 | 4.7 | 16.5 | 2.7 | 2.91 | 23.7 | 70.68 |
| 2001 | 5 276 | 119 | 25 | 94 | 22.6 | 4.7 | 17.9 | 5.6 | 2.87 | 23.0 | 70.86 |
| 2002 | 5 405 | 123 | 25 | 98 | 22.8 | 4.7 | 18.1 | 6.4 | 2.83 | 22.4 | 71.00 |
| 2003 | 5 543 | 127 | 26 | 102 | 23.1 | 4.7 | 18.4 | 7.1 | 2.80 | 21.6 | 71.13 |
| 2004 | 5 688 | 132 | 26 | 106 | 23.3 | 4.5 | 18.8 | 7.4 | 2.77 | 20.7 | 71.49 |
| 2005 | 5 838 | 138 | 26 | 111 | 23.6 | 4.5 | 19.1 | 7.3 | 2.76 | 19.7 | 71.59 |
| 2006 | 5 973 | 142 | 27 | 115 | 23.8 | 4.5 | 19.3 | 3.8 | 2.70 | 18.5 | 71.72 |
| 2007 | 6 097 | 144 | 27 | 116 | 23.6 | 4.5 | 19.1 | 1.7 | 2.65 | 17.2 | 71.86 |
| 2008 | 6 228 | 146 | 27 | 118 | 23.4 | 4.4 | 19.0 | 2.5 | 2.60 | 16.1 | 72.27 |
| 2009 | 6 360 | 147 | 28 | 119 | 23.1 | 4.4 | 18.7 | 2.5 | 2.56 | 15.1 | 72.36 |
| 2010 | 6 492 | 153 | 29 | 124 | 23.6 | 4.5 | 19.1 | 1.7 | 2.60 | 14.2 | 72.37 |
| 2011 | 6 188 | 158 | 36 | 122 | 23.9 | 5.5 | 18.4 | -65.2 | 2.65 | 15.0 | 70.07 |
| 2012 | 5 870 | 129 | 29 | 99 | 22.0 | 5.0 | 16.9 | -68.3 | 2.68 | 13.0 | 72.25 |
| 2013 | 5 985 | 131 | 30 | 101 | 21.9 | 5.1 | 16.8 | 2.8 | 2.72 | 12.5 | 72.34 |
| 2014 | 6 098 | 134 | 33 | 101 | 21.9 | 5.4 | 16.5 | 2.4 | 2.75 | 12.3 | 71.51 |
| 2015 | 6 192 | 131 | 34 | 98 | 21.2 | 5.4 | 15.8 | -0.4 | 2.71 | 11.9 | 71.70 |
| 2016 | 6 282 | 129 | 34 | 95 | 20.6 | 5.5 | 15.1 | -0.6 | 2.67 | 11.5 | 71.76 |
| 2017 | 6 378 | 127 | 34 | 93 | 19.9 | 5.3 | 14.6 | 0.7 | 2.63 | 10.9 | 72.48 |
| 2018 | 6 478 | 125 | 34 | 91 | 19.3 | 5.2 | 14.0 | 1.7 | 2.58 | 10.5 | 72.79 |
| 2019 | 6 569 | 123 | 36 | 87 | 18.7 | 5.5 | 13.3 | 0.7 | 2.54 | 10.4 | 72.46 |
| 2020 | 6 999 | 132 | 39 | 93 | 18.7 | 5.5 | 13.2 | -0.1 | 2.51 | 9.6 | 72.4 |
| 2021 | 7 092 | 130 | 42 | 88 | 18.2 | 5.8 | 12.3 | -0.1 | 2.46 | 9.0 | 72.1 |
| 2022 | 7 179 | 127 | 35 | 92 | 17.5 | 4.8 | 12.7 | -0.3 | 2.40 | 8.7 | 74.5 |
| 2023 | 7 269 | 124 | 49 | 76 | 17.0 | 6.7 | 10.4 | -0.3 | 2.35 | 16.0 | 69.3 |
| 2024 | | | | | 16.5 | 6.5 | 10.0 | | 2.30 | | |
| 2025 | | | | | 16.1 | 5.6 | 10.5 | | 2.25 | | |

Source: UN DESA, World Population Prospects, 2022

=== Life expectancy ===
Life expectancy in Libya since 1950

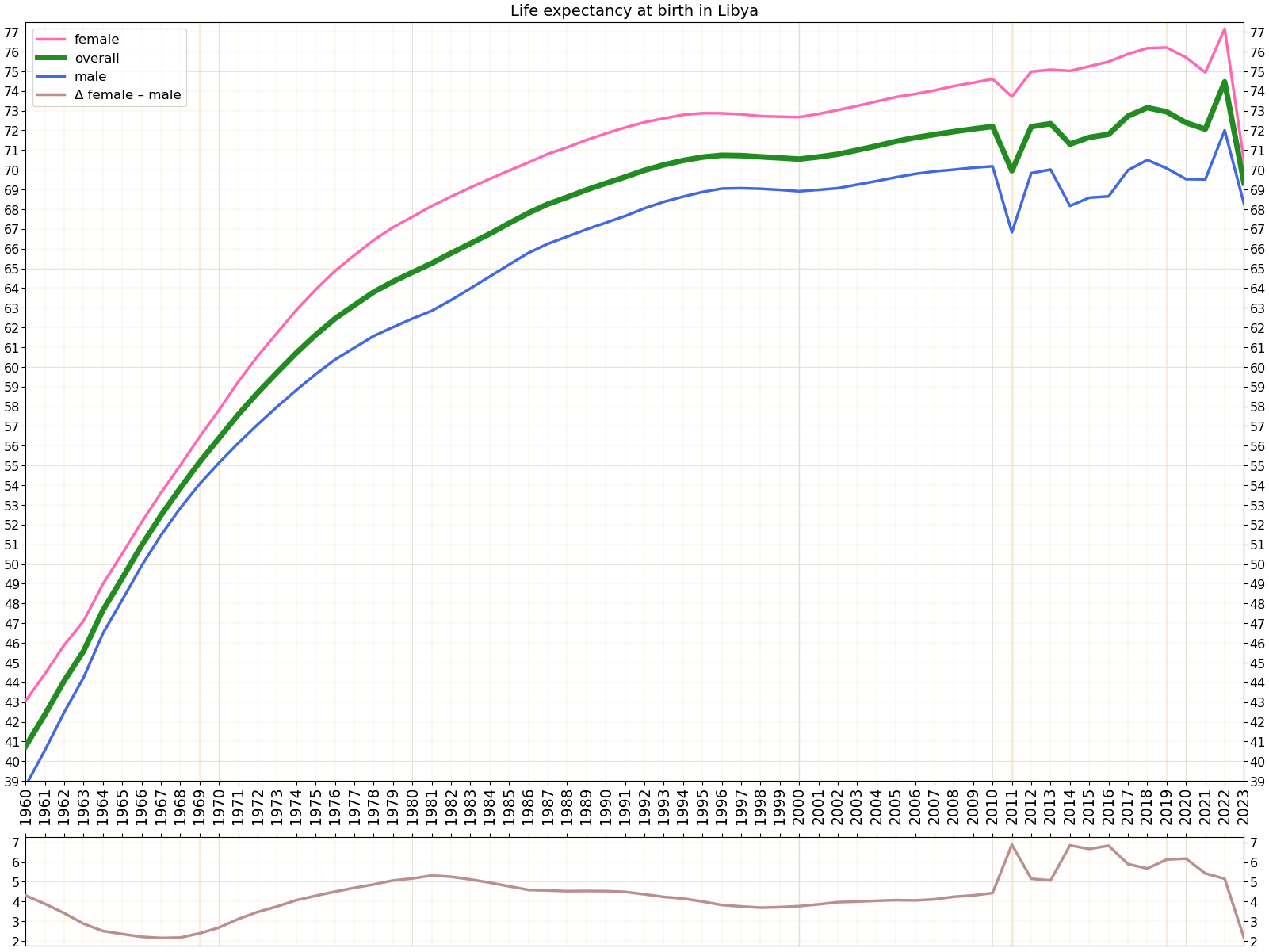
Life expectancy in Libya since 1960 by gender

== Ethnic groups ==
97% of Libya's population is made up of Arabs and Berbers, of which 92% are Arabs, 5% are Berbers. The remaining ethnic groups consist of Tuaregs and Toubou people.

Ethnic groups in Libya
1. Arabs (92.0%)
2. Berbers (5.00%)
3. Others (3.00%)

The majority of the population of Libya is primarily Arab. Unofficial estimates put the number of Berbers in Libya at around 600,000, about 10% of the population of Libya. Among the Berber groups are the minority Berber populations of Zuwarah and the Nafusa Mountains, and the nomadic Tuareg, who inhabit the southwestern areas as well as parts of southeastern Algeria, northern Mali, Niger, and Burkina Faso. In the southeast, there are also small populations of Toubou (Tibbu): they inhabit about a quarter of the country and are also found in Chad and Niger. The Zaghawa are another smaller minority ethnic group that is found along the southeastern border of Libya with Chad and Sudan. Among foreign residents, the largest groups are from other African nations, including citizens of other North African nations (primarily Egyptians) and West Africans.

There are also a significant number of Kouloughli families, who are descended of various ethnic groups like Turks, Circassians, and some Bosniaks and Albanians.

=== Tribal groups ===
Libyan society is to a large extent structured along tribal lines, with more than 20 major tribal groups.

The major tribal groups of Libya in 2011 were listed:

- Tripolitan settled tribes: Tripolis Native clans, Misurata Ahali, Misurata Karagula, Geryan, Zawia, Misalata, Khumus
- Tripolitan Bedouin tribes: Warfalla, Tarhona, Al-Zintan, Zwara Berbers, Al-Rijban, Awlad Suleiman
- Cyrenaican Bedouin tribes: Al-Awagir, Al-Abaydat, Drasa, Al-Barasa, Al-Fawakhir, Al-Zuwayya, Al-Majabra
- Sirte Bedouin: Awlad Suleiman, Qadhadhfa, Al-Magarha, Al-Magharba, Al-Riyyah, Al-Haraba, Al-Zuwaid, Al-Guwaid
- Fezzan: Awlad Suleiman, Hutman, Hassawna, Toubou, Tuareg
- Kufra: Al-Zuwayya; Toubou

Some descends of the ancient Libyan tribes, which are grouped as clans distributed across cities, include: Adyrmachidae, Awjilae Auschisae, Asbetaye, gilgamae, Macetae, Macatutae, Mermidae Nasamones, Nitriotae, and Tautamaei.

As of 2012, the major Social tribal groups of Libya, by region not by common ancestors, were as follows:

- Tripolitania: alawana-Souk El Joma'a, AL-Mahameed, Warfalla, Tarhona, Misurata tribes, Al-Jawary, Siyan Tribe, The Warshfana tribes, Zawia Groups, Ghryan Tribes, AL-Asabea, Al-Fwatir, Awlad Busayf, Zintan, Al-jbalya, Zwara, Alajelat, Al-Nawael tribe, Alalqa tribe, Al-Rijban, al Mashashi, Amaym.
- Cyrenaica: AJ-JWAZY, Al-Awagir, Magharba, Al-Abaydat, Drasa, Al-Barasa, Al-Fawakhir, Zuwayya, Majabra, Awama, Minfa, Taraki, alawana, Shwa'ir and in Kufra Zuwayya, Toubou.
- Sirte: Awlad Suleiman, Qadhadhfa, Magharba, Al-Hosoon, Ferrjan
- Fezzan: Awlad Suleiman, Al-Riyyah, Magarha, Al-Zuwaid, Al-Hutman, Al-Hassawna; Toubou, Tuareg.
- Kufra: Zuwayya; Toubou.

=== Foreign population ===
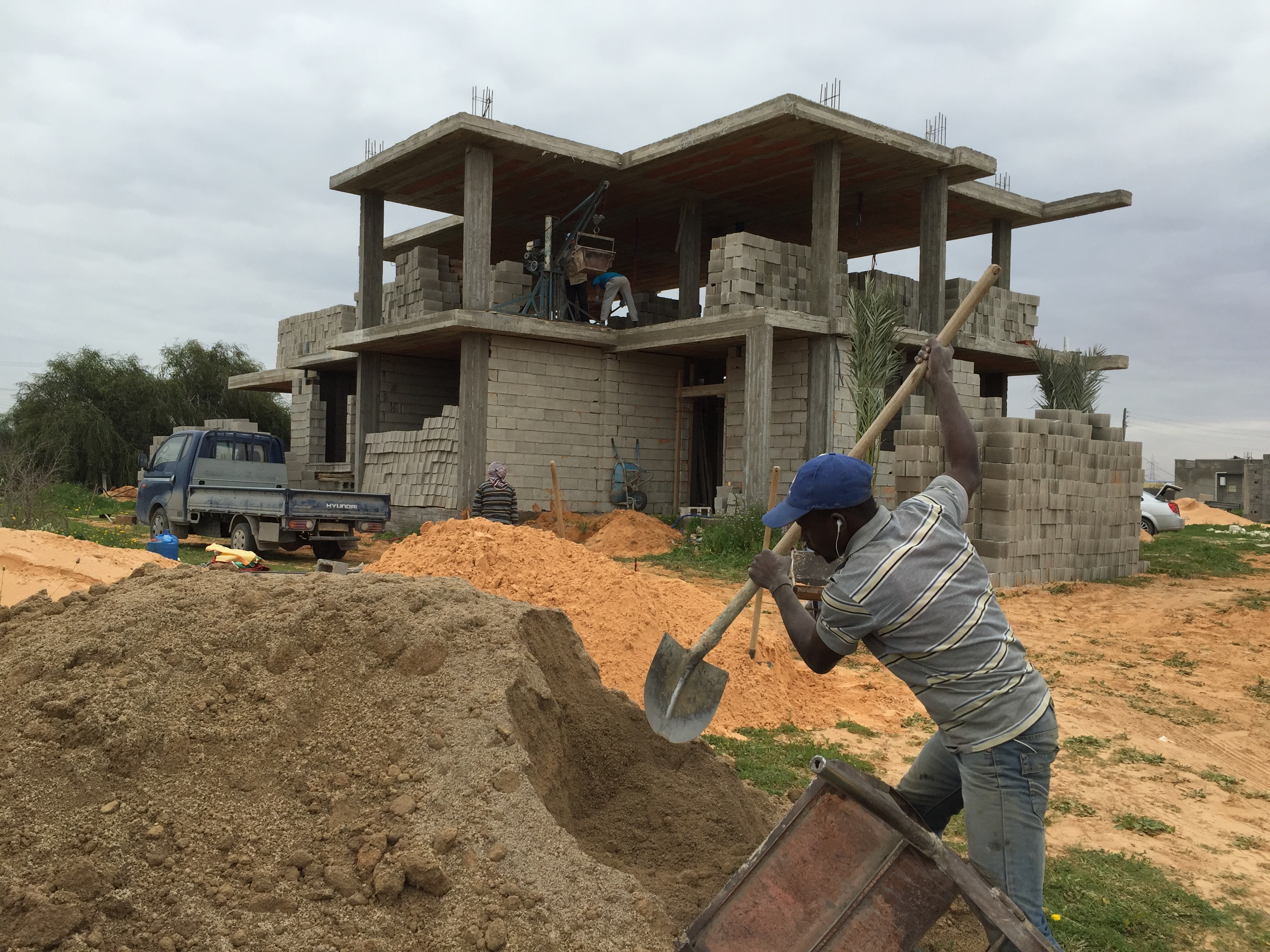
Migrant workers from Sub-Saharan Africa

As of 2020, the foreign population of Libya is estimated at 12%, most of whom are migrant workers in the oil industry from Tunisia and Egypt, but also including small numbers of Greeks, Maltese, Italians, Pakistanis, Palestinians, Turks, Indians, and people from former Yugoslavia. Due to the Libyan Civil War, most of these migrant workers have returned to their homelands or simply left the country for a different one; however, a notable minority still work in Libya. According to news accounts in Allafrica.com and the Libya Herald, between 1 million and 2 million Egyptians are resident in Libya, with Sudanese and Tunisians numbering in the hundreds to thousands. There are also up to a million undocumented migrants mainly from Sub-Saharan Africa residing in Libya. The Tunisian population in Libya is estimated at around 211,000.

=== Genetics ===
==== Y-chromosome ====
Analysis of Y-chromosome have found that the Libyan population is characterized by the high frequency of haplogroup J1-P58 (37.2%) and haplogroup E-M81 (33%).

Listed here are the human Y-chromosome DNA haplogroups in Libya taken from a sample of 215 unrelated males.

| Y-Haplogroup | Frequency | Percentage |
|---|---|---|
| J1-P58 | 80 | 37.21% |
| E1-M81(xM107, M165) | 71 | 33.02% |
| E1-M78 | 29 | 13.49% |
| G2-P15 | 11 | 5.12% |
| J2-M158 | 7 | 3.26% |
| R1b-M343 | 5 | 2.33% |
| E1-M123 | 4 | 1.86% |
| E1-M2 | 3 | 1.40% |
| J2-M92 | 2 | 0.93% |
| E1-M35(xM78, M81, M123) | 2 | 0.93% |
| R1a | 1 | 0.47% |
| Total | 215 | 100.00% |

== Religions ==
Religions of Libya
| Religions | percent |
| Sunni Islam (Official) | 96.6% |
| Christian | 2.7% |
| Folk religion | 0.1% |
| Unspecified | 0.2% |
| Other | 0.1% |

The vast majority Libyans are nominally Sunni Muslim. Almost 3% of the population is Christian, with some local Christian church adherents in Eastern Libya – the Copts. A small Jewish community historically lived in Libya since antiquity (see History of the Jews in Libya), but almost the entire Jewish community in Libya eventually fled the country for Italy, Israel, or the United States, particularly after anti-Jewish riots in the wake of the 1967 Six-Day War between Arab countries and Israel. The final Jew in Libya, Esmeralda Meghnagi, died in 2002 ending the several millennia long Jewish ancestral body in Libya.

== Languages ==
The official language of Libya is Modern Standard Arabic, while the most prevalent spoken language is Libyan Arabic. Arabic varieties are partly spoken by immigrant workers and partly by local Libyan populations. These varieties include Egyptian, Tunisian, Sudanese, Moroccan, Yemeni, Hassaniya, and South Levantine Arabic. Minority Berber languages are still spoken by the Tuareg, a rural Berber population inhabiting Libya's south, and is spoken by about 300,000 in the north: about 5% of the Libyan population.

Indigenous minority languages in Libya include:

- Berber languages: ca. 305,000 speakers (5% of the population)
  - Nafusi: 184,000 speakers (2006) (3%)
  - Tamahaq: 47,000 speakers (2006) (<1%)
  - Ghadamès: 30,000 speakers (2006) (<1%)
  - Sawknah: 5,600 speakers (2006) (<1%)
  - Awjilah: 3,000 speakers (2000) (<1%)
- Domari: ca. 33,000 speakers (2006) (<1%)
- Tedaga: 2,000 speakers (<1%)

Non-Arabic languages had largely been spoken by foreign workers (who had been massively employed in Libya in various infrastructure projects prior to the 2011 civil war), and those languages with more than 10,000 speakers included Punjabi, Urdu, Mandarin, Cantonese, Korean, Sinhala, Bengal, Tamil, Tagalog, French, Italian, Ukrainian, Serbian, and English.

== See also ==
- Health in Libya
- List of Ashraf tribes in Libya
