= Proto-Berber language =

Reconstructed ancestor of the Berber languages

Proto-Berber
- Proto-Libyan
- Reconstruction of: Berber languages
- Region: North Africa
- Era: c. 200 AD
- Reconstructed ancestor: Proto-Afroasiatic

Proto-Berber or Proto-Libyan is the reconstructed proto-language from which the modern Berber languages descend. Proto-Berber was an Afroasiatic language, and thus its descendant Berber languages are cousins to the Egyptian language, Cushitic languages, Semitic languages, Chadic languages, and the Omotic languages.

== History ==
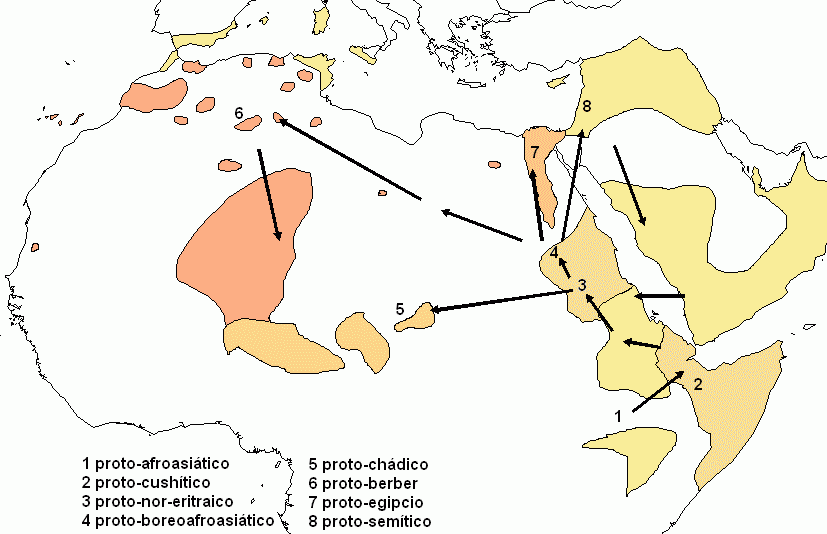
Map of the spread of the Afroasiatic languages; Proto-Berber is indicated by the number "6".

Proto-Berber shows features that clearly distinguish it from all other branches of Afroasiatic, but modern Berber languages are relatively homogeneous. Whereas the split from the other known Afroasiatic branches was very ancient, on the order of 10,000~9,000 years BP, according to glottochronological studies, Proto-Berber might be as recent as 3,000 years BP. Louali & Philippson (2003) propose, on the basis of the lexical reconstruction of livestock-herding, a Proto-Berber 1 (PB1) stage around 7,000 years BP and a Proto-Berber 2 (PB2) stage as the direct ancestor of contemporary Berber languages. It was restructured several times during the almost 10,000 years that separated Proto-Afroasiatic from the modern Berber languages, which have preserved few relics.

In the third millennium BC, proto-Berber speakers spread across the area from Morocco to Egypt. In the last millennium BC, another Berber expansion created the Berber peoples noted in Roman records. The final spread occurred in the first millennium AD, when the Tuareg, now possessing camels, moved into the central Sahara; in the past, the northern parts of the Sahara were much more habitable than they are now.

The fact that there are reconstructions for all major species of domestic ruminants but none for the camel in Proto-Berber implies that its speakers bred livestock and were pastoralists.

Roger Blench (2018) suggests that Proto-Berber speakers had spread from the Nile River valley to North Africa 4,000–5,000 years BP due to the spread of pastoralism, and experienced intense language leveling about 2,000 years BP as the Roman Empire was expanding in North Africa. Hence, although Berber had split off from Afroasiatic several thousand years ago, Proto-Berber itself can only be reconstructed to a period as late as 200 AD. The presence of Punic borrowings in Proto-Berber points to the diversification of modern Berber languages subsequent to the fall of Carthage in 146 BC; only Guanche and Zenaga lack Punic loanwords. Additionally, Latin loanwords in Proto-Berber point to the breakup of Proto-Berber between 1 and 200 AD. During this time period, Roman innovations including the ox-plough, camel, and orchard management were adopted by Berber communities along the limites, the borders of the Roman Empire. In Blench's view, this resulted in a new trading culture involving the use of a lingua franca, which became Proto-Berber.

Some scholars have suggested that Egyptian records from the Ramesside period may preserve some of the earliest evidence of ancient Libyan (proto-Berber) languages. In a 2024 study, Jakob Silvestri analyzed Libyan personal names, ethnonyms, loanwords, and fragmentary texts preserved in Egyptian hieroglyphic and hieratic records, arguing that para-Berber or early Berber languages may have been attested in Egyptian sources during the late second millennium BCE.

== Reconstructions ==
Reconstructions of Proto-Berber and earlier stages are based on comparisons with other Afro-Asiatic languages in various stages and on the comparisons between the varieties of modern Berber languages or with Tuareg, considered by some authors like Prasse to be the variety that has best preserved Proto-Berber structures.

== Phonology ==
Some earlier attempts to derive the phonemic inventory of Proto-Berber were heavily influenced by Tuareg because of its perception of being particularly conservative.

=== Vowels ===
Karl G. Prasse and Maarten Kossmann reconstruct three short vowels /a/, /i/, /u/ and four long vowels /aa/, /ii/, /uu/ and /ee/. Their main reflexes in modern Berber languages are shown in the following table:

Reflexes of PB vowels in modern Berber languages
*PB	Zenaga	Tuareg / Ghadames	Figuig and others
*a	a	ӑ	ə
*i	i	ə	ə
*u	u	ə	ə
*aa	a	a	a
*ii	i	i	i
*ee	i	e	i
*uu	u	u	u

Short vowels
	Front
High	*ə
Low	*ă

Plain vowels
	Front	Back
High	*i	*u
Mid	*e	
Low	*a	

The short vowel *ə is sometimes reconstructed as two short vowel phonemes(*ŭ and *ĭ), while *e may have been a conditioned allophone of *i and *a, rather than a true phoneme.

Tuareg and Ghadames also have /o/, which seems to have evolved from /u/ by vowel harmony in Tuareg and from *aʔ in Ghadames.

Allati has reconstructed a Proto-Berber vocalic system made of six vowels: i, u, e, o, a. Without the long vowels that are not Proto-Afroasiatic (cf. Diakonoff, 1965 : 31, 40; Bomhard et Kerns, 1994 : 107, among others) and that evolved in some modern Berber varieties (Toureg, Ghadames, ...), the system is preserved in the southeastern Berber varieties including Tuareg. It is equally close to the proposed Proto-Afroasiatic vocalic system (Diakonoff, 1965, 1988).

Alexander Militarev reconstructs the vowels /a/, /i/, /u/ in his proto-forms.

=== Consonants ===
Kossmann reconstructs the following consonantal phonemes for Proto-Berber:

Consonant phonemes
	Labial	Alveolar		Palatal	Velar		Uvular	Glottal
	Labial	Plain	Phar.	Palatal	Plain	Pal.	Uvular	Glottal
Nasal	*m	*n						
Plosive		*t *d	*dˤ		*k *g	*kʲ? *gʲ?	*ɢ	*ʔ
Fricative	*f *β	*s *z	*zˤ					
Trill		*r						
Approximant		*l		*j	*w			

As in modern Berber languages, most Proto-Berber consonants had a geminate counterpart, with the exceptions of *β, *ʔ.

The consonants *ɟ and *g have remained distinct in some Zenati languages:

PB	Tam.	Ghad.	Riff	Chen.
*ɟ	g	ɟ	ʒ	ʒ
*g	g	ɟ	y	g

Similarly, Proto-Berber *c, corresponding to k in non-Zenati varieties, became š in Zenati (but a number of irregular correspondences for this are found). For example, căm "you (f. sg.)" becomes šəm. (The change also occurs in Nafusi and Siwi.)

Eastern Berber languages:

- dˤ → tˤ

Proto-Berber *-əβ has become -i in Zenati. For example, *arəβ "write" becomes ari. (This change also occurs in varieties including the Central Atlas Tamazight dialect of the Izayan, Nafusi, and Siwi.)

Ghadamès and Awjila are the only Berber languages to preserve Proto-Berber *β as β; elsewhere in Berber it becomes h or disappears.

The Proto-Berber consonantal system reconstructed by Allati (cf. Allati, 2002, 2011) is based on remains from the ancient stages of this language preserved in the ancient toponymical strata, in Libyan inscriptions and in the modern Berber varieties. It had stops b, t, d, k, g; fricative s; nasal n and liquids l, r. The stops of the phonological system have evolved since the proto-Berber stage into variants from which other consonants have been progressively formed (Allati, 2002, 2011).

== Grammar ==
Karl G. Prasse has produced a comprehensive reconstruction of Proto-Berber morphology based on Tuareg. Additional work on the reconstruction of Proto-Berber morphology was done by Maarten Kossmann.

Proto-Berber had no grammatical case. Its descendants developed a marked nominative that is still present in Northern Berber and Southern Berber/Tuareg. Some Berber languages lost it thereafter, recently in Eastern Berber and Western Berber (Zenaga).

=== Independent personal pronouns ===
*ənakkʷ

=== Kinship ===
father	*ʔab(b)-

The relics of the ancient morphological segments preserved in the modern varieties, in the Libyan inscriptions and in the ancient toponymical strata show that the basis of word formation is a monosyllabic lexical unit (vc, cvc) whose vowels and consonants are part of the root.

Its forms and its characteristics are similar to those of the base of word formation postulated for proto-Afroasiatic. The composition and the reduplication/doubling process whose traces are preserved in all the Afroasiatic branches, including Semitic where they are fossilized in the quadrilaterals and quintiliterals, constitute the type of word formation at that stage of Berber.

These remains also show that agglutination is the Proto-Berber mode of the grammatical adjunction of morphemes whose placement was not fixed in relation to the elements that they determine (cf. Allati, 2002, 2011b/c, 2012, 2013, 2014). The relations between the predicate of existence, the core of the utterance in the proto-Berber stage, and its determinants ordered around it without a pre-established order, are indicated with affixes (cf. idem).

The Proto-Berber relics preserved at the lexico-semantic and syntactic levels show that the proto-Berber syntactic construction is of the ergative type (cf. idem). The proto-Berber statement core is a predicate of existence, a lexical base which posits the existence of a fact, of a situation...i.e. it expresses a state, a quality (cf. Allati, 2002, 2011b/c, 2013 below) having the value of a stative (cf. idem et Allati, 2008). It is not oriented in relation to its determinants (agentive subject, object...) whose syntactic functions are insured by casual elements including the casual affix (ergative) that indicates, as needed, the agent or the subject. Similar elements attested in Cushitic, Chadic and Omotic, and remains preserved in Semitic drove Diakonoff to postulate the same type of syntactic construction for proto-Semitic and proto-Afroasiatic (cf. Diakonoff, 1988, 101; cf. equally Allati, 2008, 2011a, 2012). Many elements equally show that proto-Berber did not have the noun-verb contrast, the rection contrasts, diathesis and person (cf. idem).

== Bibliography ==
- Allati, Abdelaziz (2002). Diachronie tamazighte ou berbere (in French). Publications de L'Universite Abdelmalek Essaâdi. p. 296. ISBN 9981-61-015-1.
- Blench, R. (2006). Archaeology, language, and the African past. Rowman Altamira. p. 361. ISBN 0-7591-0466-2.
- Boukouss, Ahmed (2009). Phonologie de l'amazigh (PDF). Institut Royal de la Culture Amazigh. p. 445. ISBN 978-9954-28-019-5. Archived from the original (PDF) on 2013-11-26.
- Ehret, Christopher (1995). Reconstructing Proto-Afroasiatic (Proto-Afrasian): vowels, tone, consonants, and vocabulary. University of California Press. p. 557. ISBN 0-520-09799-8.
- Heath, Jeffrey (2005). A grammar of Tamashek (Tuareg of Mali). Walter de Gruyter. p. 745. ISBN 3-11-018484-2.
- Heine, Bernd; Derek Nurse (2000). African languages: an introduction. Cambridge University Press. p. 396. ISBN 0-521-66629-5.
- Kossmann, Maarten (1999). Essai sur la phonologie du proto-berbère. Rüdiger Köppe Verlag. ISBN 978-3-89645-035-7.
- Kossmann, Maarten (2001a), "L'origine du vocalisme en zénaga de Mauritanie", in Ibriszimow, Dymitr; Vossen, Rainer (eds.), Etudes berbères, pp. 89–95
- Kossmann, Maarten (2001b), "The Origin of the Glottal Stop in Zenaga and its Reflexes in the other Berber Languages", Afrika und Übersee, 84: 61–100
- Kossmann, Maarten (2020), "Proto-Berber phonological reconstruction: An update", Linguistique et Langues Africaines, 6 (6): 11–42, doi:10.4000/lla.277, hdl:1887/3194969, S2CID 248596900
- König, Christa (2008). Case in Africa. Oxford University Press. p. 343. ISBN 978-0-19-923282-6.
- Prasse, Karl G. (1972–1974). Manuel de grammaire touarègue (tăhăggart). Vol. 3. Copenhagen.
