= Awjilah =

Awjilah may refer to:

- Awjilah language, an Eastern Berber language spoken in Libya
- Awjilah, Libya, a town

== See also ==
- Awjila-Sokna, a group of Berber languages spoken in Libya and Egypt
