= Libyan language =

Libyan language may refer to:

- the Eastern Berber languages
- Libyan Arabic
- the Numidian language, also called Libyan or Old Libyan, a largely undeciphered language using the Libyco-Berber script

== See also ==
- Languages of Libya
