= Wadi Wishka Dam =

Dam in Sokna, Libya

- Location within Libya
- Country: Libya
- Location: Sokna
- Coordinates: 28°49′56″N 15°37′24″E
- Status: Operational
- Construction began: 2004
- Opening date: 2006
- Construction cost: US$5 million

Dam and spillways
- Impounds: Wadi Wishka
- Height: 25 m (82 ft)
- Length: 160 m (525 ft)

Reservoir
- Total capacity: 82,000 m^{3} (66 acre⋅ft)

The Wadi Wishka Dam is a concrete-face rock-fill embankment dam located on Wadi Wishka, 29 km (18 mi) southwest of Sokna in the Fezzan region of Libya. The primary purpose of the dam is flood control and water. Construction on the dam began in 2004 and it was completed in 2006 at a cost of US$5 million.
