= Zuwayya =

Zuwayya (arabic: الزْوَيّة) (Al-Zuwayya) are an independent Murabtin tribe, one of the major Arab Bedouin tribes of Cyrenaica and Fezzan, Libya.

Traditionally practicing nomadic pastoralism of camels in a triangular area with its apex at Ajdabiya, the Zuwayya conquered the richest oasis of the interior, Kufra, in 1840.

This expansion occurred at the expense of the indigenous Toubou population, resulting in their political subjugation and the incorporation of many individuals into systems of servitude that were prevalent in the region at the time.

The Zuwayya tribe owns most of the date palm groves of the Kufra oases, employing the Toubou tribesmen as labourers.

The Zuwayya Majabra tribe of Jalu converted to the Senussi order in the late 19th century, allowing the spread of this ideology into Wadai and Chad.

The Zuwayya tribe took part in the Libyan Civil War on the side of the opposition. In February 2011, the head of the tribe, Shaikh Faraj al Zuway, threatened to cut off Libyan oil exports unless the Gaddafi government stopped the "suppression of protestors".
