= Siwi language =

Eastern Berber language of western Egypt

Siwi
- Siwan, Siwa Berber
- Jlan n Isiwan
- Native to: Egypt, Libya
- Region: Siwa Oasis, Qara Oasis, Al Jaghbub Oasis
- Ethnicity: Siwi
- Native speakers: 21,000 (2013–2023)
- Language family: Afro-Asiatic: Berber; Eastern; Siwi

Language codes
- ISO 639-3: siz
- Glottolog: siwi1239
- ELP: Siwi
- Siwi is classified as Definitely Endangered by the UNESCO Atlas of the World's Languages in Danger (2010)

Siwi (also known as Siwan or Siwa Berber; endonym: Jlan n isiwan) is the easternmost Berber language, spoken in the western Egyptian desert by an estimated 15,000 to 20,000 people in the oases of Siwa and Gara, near the Libyan border.

Siwi is the normal language of daily communication among the Egyptian Berbers of Siwa and Gara, but because it is not taught at local schools, used in the media nor recognised by the Egyptian government, its long-term survival may be threatened by contacts with outsiders and by the use of Egyptian Arabic in mixed marriages; nearly all Siwis today learn to speak Egyptian Arabic as a second language from an early age.

Siwi has been heavily influenced by Arabic, notably Egyptian and Bedouin, but also earlier stages of Arabic.

Siwi is the only Berber language indigenous to Egypt and is natively spoken further east than any other Berber variety of North Africa. Within Berber, it stands out for a number of unusual linguistic features, including the collapse of gender distinctions in the plural, the absence of dedicated negative forms of the verb, the use of full finite agreement on the verb in subject relativization, the use of la for sentential negation and the borrowing from Arabic of a productive comparative form for adjectives. Siwi also shows a typological feature that is strikingly rare, not only regionally but also worldwide: addressee agreement on demonstratives.

== Classification ==
Siwi was traditionally associated with the Zenati subgroup of Berber, following the 15th-century historian al-Maqrizi as well as Destaing, who treated both as members of a groupe du Nord (northern group), on the basis of similarities in the verbal system. Vycichl notes that it shares the feature of prefix vowel reduction with Zenati. Aikhenvald and Militarev, followed by Ethnologue, placed Siwi in an Eastern Berber group, along with Awjila and Sokna in eastern and central Libya. Kossmann links it with Sokna and the Nafusi dialect cluster of western Libya and Tunisia, but not with Awjila. Souag similarly argues, based on shared innovations, that Siwi has emerged from a dialect continuum stretching between Nafusi and Sokna that excluded Awjila, and went on to have some influence on Awjila after this dialect continuum's breakup.

The Endangered Languages Project classifies the Siwa language as vulnerable to extinction, listing a 20% certainty based on compiled evidence.

== Phonology ==
As analysed by Naumann, Siwi has a total of 44 phonologically distinctive segments, 38 consonants and 6 vowels.

=== Consonants ===
The Siwa language contains 38 consonants, each of which can appear either short or long.

		Labial		Alveolar (Apical)		Postalveolar /Palatal (Laminal)	Velar		Uvular		Epiglottal	Glottal
		plain	phar.	plain	phar.	Postalveolar /Palatal (Laminal)	plain	lab.	plain	lab.	Epiglottal	Glottal
Nasal		m	mˤ	n								
Stop	voiceless			t	tˤ	t͡ʃ*	k	kʷ	q	qʷ		(ʔ)
Stop	voiced	b	bˤ	d	dˤ	d͡ʒ*	ɡ	ɡʷ				
Fricative	voiceless	f	fˤ	s	sˤ	ʃ			χ	χʷ		
Fricative	voiced			z	zˤ				ʁ*	ʁʷ*		ɦ*
Lateral				l	lˤ							
Approximant						j		w				
Trill	voiceless										ʜ	
Trill	voiced			ɾ*	rˤ						ʢ*	

Notes

- /t͡ʃ/ /d͡ʒ/ are phonetically affricates, not stops.
- /ʁ ʁʷ ʢ ɦ/ can appear as approximants.
- The geminate counterpart of /ɾ/ is [rː].

The transcription of these consonants differs somewhat from source to source. Naumann proposes a practical Latin-based transcription inspired by common practice in other Berber languages: pharyngealised consonants are transcribed with an underdot (e.g., ⟨ṭ⟩ for /tˤ/), postalveolars are written with a hacek (⟨č⟩, ⟨ğ⟩, ⟨š⟩ for /tʃ/, /dʒ/, /ʃ/), semivowel /j/ as ⟨y⟩, uvular fricatives as corresponding velars (⟨x⟩, ⟨ɣ⟩) and epiglottals as ⟨ḥ⟩, ⟨ɛ⟩. However, the epiglottals are often instead transcribed as corresponding pharyngeals ⟨ħ⟩, ⟨ʕ⟩, avoiding the danger of mistaking ⟨ɛ⟩ for a vowel, while the voiced postalveolar affricate/fricative is often written as ⟨j⟩ or ⟨ž⟩. All sources transcribe the glottal fricative as ⟨h⟩.

=== Vowels ===
Siwi has six phonemic vowels: /a, e, i, o, u, ə/. The mid vowels /e/ and /o/ are excluded from word-final position, and /o/ is rare. The presence of mid vowels is unusual for a Berber language, and largely reflects Siwi-specific sound changes as well as borrowing from dialectal Arabic; before these changes, the proto-Berber distinction between *i and *e had been neutralized in every environment except before word-final /n/.

== Grammar ==
The basic word order of Siwi is subject-verb-object, as in:

akúḅḅi la yušas náčču i támẓa
boy not he.gave.her food to ogress
'The boy didn't give food to the ogress.'

Prepositions precede the noun phrase. Within the noun phrase, numerals (except, sometimes, 'one') precede the noun quantified, while other modifiers follow the head noun. Demonstratives always follow adjectives or possessive suffixes, and may even follow relative clauses, e.g.:

akbər ə́nnəw aməllal dawok
robe my white that
'that white robe of mine'

=== Nouns ===
Siwi nouns are specified for gender (masculine or feminine) and number (singular or plural; on the occasional occurrence of duals, see Numerical system below). Most nouns incorporate a fixed prefix, usually a- for masculine singular (e.g., asen 'tooth'), i- for masculine plural (e.g., isenən 'teeth'), ta- for feminine singular (e.g., taṣṛəṃt 'intestine'), ti- for feminine plural (e.g., tiṣəṛṃen 'intestines'). Arabic loans often start with invariant (ə)l-, usually assimilating to a following coronal, e.g., ləqləm 'pen', ddhan 'oil'. Many nouns also incorporate a suffix, usually feminine singular -t, masculine plural -ən, feminine plural -en, as seen above; Arabic loans often show a feminine singular suffix -ət or -a, and a feminine plural suffix -at or -iyyat, e.g., ɣṛaḅa 'raven' vs. ɣṛaḅiyyat 'ravens'. Pluralization is often also marked on the stem itself by internal changes, e.g., azidi 'jackal' vs. izida 'jackals', ašṭiṭ 'bird' vs. išəṭṭan 'birds'.

In a noun either the last syllable or the second-to-last (penultimate) is stressed, depending on context. The factors determining stress in the noun remain a matter of debate. According to Souag, stress depends essentially on definiteness: definite nouns receive penultimate stress, while indefinites are stressed on the last syllable. Schiattarella argues that the situation is somewhat more complicated: notably, locatives and right detached nouns receive accent on the last syllable, while left detached nouns are stressed on the penultimate.

Unlike most larger Berber languages, Siwi has no state distinction: a noun takes the same form whether used as subject or as object.

=== Adjectives ===
Siwi adjectives agree with their heads (or their referents) in gender and number, using a subset of the same affixes given above for nouns; for example:

		small	mute
masc	singular	aħəkkik	ləbkəm
masc	plural	iħəkkikən	lbəkmən
fem	singular	taħəkkəkt	tləbkəmt
fem	plural	tiħəkkiken	təlbəkmen

However, agreement is not always complete. Feminine plural nouns often show masculine plural agreement.

Adjectives may be marked with a suffix -a, whose function, possibly aspectual, has not yet been conclusively established.

Gradable adjectives with no more than three root consonants form an invariant comparative based on the consonantal template (ə)CCəC, originally borrowed from Arabic: thus aħəkkik 'small' yields əħkək 'smaller', agzal 'short' yields gzəl 'smaller', aẓəy 'bitter' yields ẓya 'more bitter'. Adding a suffix -hŭm to this in turn yields the superlative.

=== Demonstratives ===
Demonstratives agree with their referent in number and, if singular, in gender; medial demonstratives also agree with the addressee, a typologically unusual type of allocutive agreement. The pronominal demonstratives are as follows:

- 'this' (proximal): m. wa / waya, f. ta / taya, pl. wi / wiyya
- 'this/that' (medial, speaking to a man): m. wok, f. tok, pl. wiyyok
- 'this/that' (medial, speaking to a woman): m. wom, f. tom, pl. wiyyom
- 'this/that' (medial, speaking to a group): m. werwən, f. terwən, pl. wiyyerwən
- 'that' (distal): m. wih, f. tih, pl. widin

When a demonstrative modifies a noun phrase, it takes a prefix da- (ta- for feminine singular). To form a presentative ('here is...'), it instead takes a prefix ɣ-. Placeholders ('whatsit', 'whatchamacallit') use the singular distal forms plus -in (wihin, tihin).

Demonstrative adverbials are based on the same series minus referent agreement markers: proximal -a / -aya, medial -ok / -om / -erwən, distal -ih. Locative adverbs ('here', 'there') prefix to these gd- (or approximate locative ss-), while adverbs of manner ('like this', 'like that') prefix ams-.

=== Personal pronouns ===
Siwi personal pronouns distinguish number and (in the singular only) gender. Siwi is a pro-drop language, so the use of independent forms is relatively limited; instead, agreement markers or referential suffixes usually suffice to make pronominal reference unambiguous. The following table gives the system:

Siwi pronouns
	Independent	Direct object	Object of preposition / possessor of kinship term	Indirect object	Possessive	Object of "because of"	Subject agreement	Imperative subject agreement
1sg.	niš	-i	V-ø / C-i	-i	nnəw	-i	-ax / -a / -ɣ- / -ʕ-	
2sg.m.	šəkk	-ek	-k	-ak	nnək	-ăk	-aṭ / -ṭ-	ø
2s.f.	šəmm	-em	-m	-am	nnəm	-ki	-aṭ / -ṭ-	ø
3sg.m.	nətta	-a / Aff-t	-s	-as	nnəs	-ăh	y-	
3sg.f.	ntatət	-et / Aff-tət	-s	-as	nnəs	-ha	t-	
1pl.	nišni / nični	-anax	-nax	-anax	nnax	-na	n-	(n-...-wət)
2pl.	nknəṃ	-ewən	-wən	-awən	nwən	-kŭm	-m	-wət / -m-
3pl.	ntnən	-en / Aff-tən	-sən	-asən	nsən	-hŭm	y-...-n	

Some subject agreement markers take different forms before indirect object agreement markers, indicated above with dashes on both sides (e.g., -m-). 3rd person direct object suffixes take different forms depending on whether they follow another affix or directly follow the stem. After 1Sg subject agreement, second person direct objects are expressed with the corresponding independent pronouns. The special series for 'because of' (msabb/mišan) is borrowed from Arabic.

=== Verbs ===
Siwi verbs agree in person, number, and (when singular) gender with their subjects and their indirect objects, and take suffixes marking pronominal objects. The verb 'open', for example, is conjugated in the perfective as follows:

		singular	plural
1st person		fətk-ax I opened	nə-ftək we opened
2nd person		fətk-aṭ you (sg.) opened	fətk-əm you (pl.) opened
3rd person	masc	yə-ftək he opened	yə-ftk-ən they opened
3rd person	fem	tə-ftək she opened	yə-ftk-ən they opened

In some cases, plural nouns trigger feminine singular agreement.

The order of pronominal affixes on the verb is as follows: (subject)-stem-(subject)-(indirect object)-(direct object), e.g., y-uš-as-t i talti 'he gave it (m.) to the woman'.

Siwi verbs are also marked for aspect and mood. The basic stem is used in the imperative and in the irrealis/aorist; the latter normally takes a prefix ga- (preceding agreement suffixes), or (əd)da- for suggestives. The perfective form is identical to the stem for most verbs, but in a few is marked by a variable suffixed vowel. The imperfective is formed from the stem by a variety of morphological strategies, including gemination of the second consonant, t prefixation, and insertion of an a. A special perfect/resultative (unusual within Berber) is formed from the perfective by suffixing -a to a fully conjugated perfective verb including any suffixes, changing ə in the last syllable to i; the same procedure, applied to an imperfective verb, yields the meaning 'while'. Thus, for example, from the verb ukəl 'walk' Siwi derives:

- perfective y-ukəl 'he walked'
- resultative y-ukil-a 'he has walked'
- imperfective i-takəl 'he walks, he is walking, he was walking'
- imperfective+a i-takil-a 'while he is/was walking'
- ga+aorist g-(y)-ukəl 'he will walk, he would walk'
- ədda+aorist ədd-(y)-ukəl 'let him walk!'

Unlike many Berber languages, Siwi has no special verbal morphology for negation; in all aspects and moods, verbs are simply negated with the preverbal particle la. The prohibitive ('do not'), however, uses the imperfective form of the verb, unlike the imperative which uses the basic stem.

== Numerical system ==
The Siwi numerical system is almost entirely borrowed from Arabic; speakers have only retained two traditional Berber numerals, one and two, which are used rather consistently for qualifying nouns but compete with Arabic equivalents for the purpose of counting. The numerals 3-10 have the same form whether used for counting or for qualifying nouns. Numbers 11-19 are described by Naumann (2009) as having two separate forms for counting and qualifying nouns. The table that follows is from Naumann, and (following the source) uses IPA rather than practical transcription.

1. waʜəd ~ əd͡ʒːən, əd͡ʒːən, əd͡ʒːət	22. ətnaina wa ʢəʃrin (c. and q.)
2. ətnain ~ sən, sən	23. ətlata wa ʢəʃrin (c. and q.)
3. ətlata	24. arˤbˤəʢa wa ʢəʃrin (c. and q.)
4. arˤbˤəʢa (c. and q.)	25. χamsa wa ʢəʃrin (c. and q.)
5. χamsa (c. and q.)	26. sətti wa ʢəʃrin (c. and q.)
6. sətti (c. and q.)	27. səbʢa wa ʢəʃrin (c. and q.)
7. səbʢa (c. and q.)	28. ətmanja wa ʢəʃrin (c. and q.)
8. ətmanja (c. and q.)	29. təsˤʢa wa ʢəʃrin (c. and q.)
9. təsˤʢa (c. and q.)	30. ətlatin (c. and q.)
10. ʢaʃrˤa (c. and q.)	40. arˤbˤəʢin (c. and q.)
11. əʜdaʃərˤ (counting), əʜdaʃ (q.n.)	50. χamsin (c. and q.)
12. ətˤnaʃərˤ (c.), ətˤnaʃ (q.n.)	60. səttin (c. and q.)
13. ətlətˤaʃərˤ (c.), ətlətˤaʃ (q.n.)	70. səbʢin (c. and q.)
14. arˤbəʢtˤaʃərˤ (c.), arˤbəʢtˤaʃ (q.n.)	80. ətmanjin (c. and q.)
15. əχməstˤaʃərˤ (c.), əχməstˤaʃ (q.n.)	90. təsˤʢin (c. and q.)
16. səttˤaʃərˤ (c.), səttˤaʃ (q.n.)	100. məjja (c. and q.)
17. əsbaʢtˤaʃərˤ (c.), əsbaʢtˤaʃ (q.n.)	200. məjjətain (c. and q.)
18. ətmantˤaʃərˤ (c.), ətmantˤaʃ (q.n.)	1000. alf (c. and q.)
19. ətsaʢtˤaʃərˤ (c.), ətsaʢtˤaʃ (q.n.)	2000. alfain (not attested)

Some speakers preserve a feminine form for inherited 'two', ssnət.

A further complication in the numeral system is the systematic use of duals and special bound forms of numerals with units of measurement borrowed from Arabic; thus from ssənt 'year' we get sənt-en 'two years' rather than using sən or tnen, and from ssbuʕ 'week' we get təlt sbuʕ-at (with təlt rather than tlata for 'three').

== Literature ==
Siwi is not a written language, in the sense that Siwi people normally write in Standard Arabic. It is, however, the vehicle of a little-documented oral literature. Among the relatively few materials published, four genres are conspicuous: song lyrics or poems, fairy tales, riddles, and proverbs.

=== Verse ===
Siwi verse is written in rhyme, and is usually associated with song. Sung poetry, or adyaz, is performed mainly in bachelors' gatherings and tends to relate to love, whereas religious poetry (ləqṣidət) is recited. Malim distinguishes songs, led by one man, from poems, shorter verse works recited antiphonally by groups at weddings; both are accompanied by the music of drums and horns. In previous centuries these songs appear to have been of great symbolic importance to Siwi young men: a civil war in the oasis in 1712 was apparently terminated by a treaty including the stipulation that:

"if one of the Western zaggālah [bachelor farm workers] was singing in a garden, while doing his work there, and stopped, then one of the zaggālah of the Easterners should begin to sing and finish his song; the Westerner was not allowed to sing once more."

The earliest Siwi lyrics to be published are those gathered by Bricchetti-Robetti; others have been published in Jawharī and Souag, while Abd Allah and Malim provide several songs and poems in translation. The songs were also studied from a musicological perspective by Schiffer. The following extract from a love song may give an idea of the genre:

nəjʕə́l niráwa akəḅḅí	We thought we had born a boy;
nəssəlsíya af̣andí	We dressed him up as a gentleman;
wə́n géyfəl nə́ṃṃas ʕə́ẓẓṃas	Whoever passed by, we would tell him to salute him.
yáma iṣáṛi fəllas	How much has happened to me because of him,
landál d uli asəllás	The mean one with a dark heart!

=== Tales ===
A Siwi tale (tanf̣ast) uses a specific opening formula:

tixəṛxaṛén, tibəṛbaṛén, tiqəṭṭušén, g álbab n alħošə́nnax
tixəṛxaṛen, tibəṛbaṛen 'at the door of our courtyard'

and closes with the formula:

ħattuta, ħattuta, qəṣṣəṛ ʕṃəṛha. akəṃṃús n əlxér i ənšní, akəṃṃús n šáṛ i əntnə́n
'Tale, tale, it has shortened its span. A bundle of goodness to us, a bundle of badness to them.'

They were typically told by old women to children on evenings to entertain and perhaps to educate them. Since the arrival of television in the oasis, this practice has largely disappeared. Apart from humans and (talking) animals, a common character in such tales is the ogre (amẓa) or ogress (tamẓa). The first Siwi tales to appear in print were four short fables gathered from men ("The Jackal and the Ewe", "The Jackal and the Hyena", "The Hare, the Jackal, the Hyena, and the Lion", and "The Magic Ring") in Laoust. Malim gives two Siwi folk tales ("The Green Cow" and "The King's Daughter and the Three Beautiful Girls") in English translation. Schiattarella transcribes and translates fourteen tales, gathered from women.

=== Riddles ===
Malim describes riddles as "once the preferred pastime of Siwi women", who would meet at night to exchange them, but notes that they have largely been superseded by watching television. Few Siwi riddles have been published; Malim gives some twenty, while Schiattarella records four, including:

itákəl g əlqášš,	It walks in the straw
l-itə́ṃṃəl xášš	and it doesn't rustle.
Answer: tlá	The shadow

=== Proverbs ===
Among existing publications on Siwi, only Malim discusses proverbs in any detail, drawing a distinction between "morals", timeworn advice in proverbial form, and proverbs proper. Examples of the former include "Wear clothes that others prefer, but eat and drink what you prefer"; of the latter, "A man who sells a cow, and asks for more money for the insect on it" (in his transcription, Yzenz tfonst, eftash aflokrad ines), mocking excessive concern about small sums.

== Writing samples ==
The thumbnail picture at the following link contains a list of pronouns and typical greetings first written in Siwi, then with the English pronunciation and translation, and ending with a description of the word in Arabic.
