= Fuqaha, Libya =

Fuqaha الفقهاء
- Town
- Location in Libya
- Coordinates: 27°50′N 16°21′E
- Country: Libya
- Region: Fezzan
- District: Jufra
- Elevation: 2,605 ft (794 m)
- Time zone: UTC+2 (EET)

Fuqaha or El-Foqaha (Arabic: الفقهاء) is a spring-fed town in central Libya, 200 km by road south of Sokna, on the western edge of the great central Haruj volcano and lava field. It is an isolated Berber-speaking locale, and it shares this identity with the oasis of Sokna to its north.

Fuqaha was one of the last holdouts of loyalists in the 2011 Libyan civil war.
