= Zurg language =

Extinct Berber language of Libya

Zurg
- Kufra
- Native to: Libya
- Region: Kufra District
- Extinct: (date missing)
- Language family: Afro-Asiatic: Berber; Eastern; Zurg

Language codes
- ISO 639-3: None (mis)
- Glottolog: None

Zurg (or Kufra) is a reportedly extinct Berber language formerly spoken in the town of Kufra in southeastern Libya. No data seems to be attested for it, and it is described by Benkato (2017) as a "ghost language" that may never have existed.
