= Sokna, Libya =

Sokna Isuknen Sawkna, Soukana
- Town
- Location in Libya
- Coordinates: 29°04′01″N 15°47′05″E
- Country: Libya
- Region: Fezzan
- District: Jufra
- Elevation: 2,290 ft (698 m)

Population (2006)
  - Total: 9,887
- Time zone: UTC+2 (EET)

Sokna (Arabic: سوكنة, IPA ['so:kna], also transliterated as Socna or Sawknah, Tamazight: Isuknen) is a Saharan desert oasis town in the Fezzan region of southwest Libya.

The Eastern Berber language Sokna is native to the town. This local pre-arabized dialect, which fell out of use by the end of the 20th century, is retained in place names. Presently, the population speaks Arabic.

== Geography ==
Sokna is located 16.5 km (10.3 mi) southwest of the district capital Hun, in the Jufra District. The natural springs support native date palm (Phoenix dactylifera) groves. Due to its reliable supply of water, it has been an important hub on the trans-Saharan route since prehistory.

== See also ==
- List of cities in Libya
