= Ghadamès language =

Berber language spoken in Libya

Ghadamès
- Ghadāmis
- Native to: Libya
- Region: Ghadames
- Native speakers: 17,000 (2020)
- Language family: Afro-Asiatic: Berber; Eastern; Ghadamès
- Dialects: Ayt Waziten, Ayt Ulid

Language codes
- ISO 639-3: gha
- Glottolog: ghad1239
- ELP: Ghadamès

Ghadamès (Note: Berber: ⵄⴰⴷⴻⵎⴻⵙ / Ɛadēməs [ʕadeːməs], Standard Arabic غدامس /ɣadaːmis/, Libyan Arabic /ɣdaːməs/) (also called Ghadamsi or Ghadamsian) is an Eastern Berber language that is spoken in, and named after, the oasis town of Ghadames in the Nalut District of western Libya.

== Research ==
Ghadamès language materials have been gathered by two linguists. The first materials were published in 1903 and 1904 by Adolphe de Calassanti Motylinski (1854–1907). A more copious and reliable source is provided by the works of White Father Jacques Lanfry (1910-2000), who stayed in Ghadames from 1944 to 1945 and who published his main works in 1968 and 1973. No new research has been undertaken on location since then. Recently, Kossmann (2013) has published a modern grammar of Ghadamès based on Lanfry’s materials.

== Number of speakers ==
Lanfry mentions the number of c. 4,000 speakers as an optimistic estimate. The actual number of speakers is not known with certainty. Ethnologue cites a number of 13,100 speakers in 2016, including 2,000 living outside the area. However, this number reflects the total number of inhabitants of Ghadames, who are not all native speakers of Ghadamès, while the number of 2,000 emigrant speakers is based on a very old source. Ethnologue classifies the language as 6b (Threatened).

== The language ==
Ghadamès is a Berber language on that preserves several unique phonological and morphological features, and the Ghadamès lexicon, as recorded by Lanfry, shows relatively little influence from Arabic. There is as yet no consensus on the classification of Ghadamès within the Berber language group. Aikhenvald and Militarev (1984) group it as Eastern Berber, and Kossmann (1999) specifically groups it together with the Awjila language. Ethnologue classifies it as East Zenatic.

== Phonology ==
=== Consonants ===
Like other Berber languages, Ghadamès has both pharyngealized ("emphatic") and plain dental consonants. Gemination is contrastive. Consonants listed between brackets occur only very sporadically.

Consonant phonemes (IPA)
		Labial	Inter- dental	Dental	Dental phar.	Palatal	Velar	Uvular	Pharyngeal	Glottal
Nasal		m		n̪						
Plosive	voiceless	(p)		t̪	t̪ˤ	(tʃ)	k	q		
Plosive	voiced	b		d̪	dˤ	ɟ	ɡ			
Fricative	voiceless	f	(θ)	s̪	s̪ˤ	ʃ	x		ħ	h
Fricative	voiced	β	(ð)	z̪	z̪ˤ	ʒ	ɣ		ʕ	
Approximant		w		l̪	l̪ˤ	j				
Trill				r̪	r̪ˤ					

=== Vowels ===
Most Berber languages have just three phonemic vowels. Ghadamès, like Tamasheq, has seven vowels.

Vowel phonemes (IPA)
	Front	Central	Back
Close	i		u
Close-mid	e		o
Mid		ə	
Near-open		ɐ	
Open		a	

== Basic vocabulary ==
Below is the Leipzig-Jakarta list for Ghadames, extracted from Lanfry (1973). Lanfry's unconventional transcription has been adapted to modern usage. Symbols ă, ḥ, j, š, ž, y are equivalent to IPA ɐ, ħ, ɟ, ʃ, ʒ, j. Lanfry's length notation on vowels probably represents lexical stress (Kossmann 2013: 5, 15).

1	fire	ōfa
2	nose	tənzart
3	to go	as with verbal deictic n "thither" (cf. 11 to come)
4	water	aman (plurale tantum)
5	mouth	ame
6	tongue	ēləs
7	blood	dămmăn (plurale tantum)
8	bone	ɣăṣṣ
9	2SG pronoun	šăgg(ən) (M), šămm(ən) (F)
10	root	aẓur "root of plant"
11	to come	as with verbal deictic d "hither" (cf. 3 to go)
12	breast	bab, admār
13	rain	anaẓar
14	1SG pronoun	năšš(ən)
15	name	ism
16	louse	talləkt
17	wing	afraw
18	flesh/meat	aksəm
19	hand/arm	ōfəss "hand", āɣil "arm"
20	fly	izi
21	night	ēβăḍ
22	ear	ēsəm
23	neck	takorəmt (cf. 47 back)
24	far	(not attested)
25	to do/make	əqḍu "to do, achieve" < Arabic, ăj "to put, to make"
26	house	daž, taddart
27	stone/rock	ērəj
28	bitter	iẓēk "to be bitter"
29	to say	ăn
30	tooth	asēn "incisor", taɣməst "molar", tawjlet "canine"
31	hair	azaw
32	big	(not attested)
33	one	yōn (M), yōt (F)
34	who?	anno
35	3SG pronoun	(n)itto (M), (n)ittāt (F)
36	to beat/hit	ŏwət
37	leg/foot	aḍar
38	horn	aškaw
39	this	-o
40	fish	(not attested)
41	yesterday	ənḍəβăd
42	to drink	ăsw
43	black	săṭṭăf "to be black" (perfective stem; aorist stem not attested)
44	navel	tamet
45	to stand	ăβdəd "to be standing", ăkkər "to stand up"
46	to bite	ămbər
47	back	akorm, təkurmēn (cf. 23 neck)
48	wind	aḍo "wind, odour"
49	smoke	ōβo
50	what?	ke, me
51	child (kin term)	ara, tarwa
52	egg	tasadəlt
53	to give	ăkf
54	new	(not attested)
55	to burn (intr.)	ărɣ
56	not	wăl, ak
57	good	samēḥ < Arabic
58	to know	ăssən
59	knee	ōfəd
60	sand	tamallilt
61	to laugh	ăḍs
62	to hear	ăsl
63	soil	tammurt "earth, soil"
64	leaf	təfra "leaf of tree"
65	red	azŭggaɣ "red one" (prob. /azəggʷaɣ/)
66	liver	tōsa
67	to hide	əkənn
68	skin/hide	ēlăm "animal skin"
69	to suck	ăzməm
70	to carry	ăbb "to carry, bring", ăškəl "to carry, lift"
71	ant	takəṭfet
72	heavy	ăẓẓāk "to be heavy" (perfective stem; aorist stem not attested)
73	to take	āβăʕ "to take", ōməẓ "to seize, hold"
74	old	imqōr, iwsər "to be old, elderly (human)"
75	to eat	ăšš
76	thigh	taɣma
77	thick	izwər "to be thick"
78	long	əzzəjrət "to be long"
79	to blow	sβəḍ
80	wood	asɣēr "(piece of) wood"
81	to run	ăzzəl
82	to fall	ōḍu
83	eye	awăll
84	ash	ēšəd
85	tail	tabaḥṣuṣṣ < Arabic?
86	dog	ēde
87	to cry/weep	ăẓẓəf
88	to tie	ăqqēn
89	to see	ălləm
90	sweet	(not attested)
91	rope	tazara
92	shade/shadow	tēle
93	bird	ajaḍiḍ
94	salt	tēsənt
95	small	imtēt "to be small"
96	wide	(not attested)
97	star	iri
98	in	dəj, -i
99	hard	(not attested)
100	to grind/crush	ăẓəd "to grind", ăddəβ "to crush (in a mortar)"

== Cited works ==
- Calassanti Motylinski, A. de (1903). "Note sur la mission dans le Souf pour y étudier le dialecte berbère de R'adamès". Journal Asiatique. 1903, II: 157–162.
- Calassanti Motylinski, A. de (1904). Le dialecte berbere de R’edamès. Paris: Leroux.
- Kossmann, M. (2013). A Grammatical Sketch of Ghadames Berber (Libya). Köln: Köppe. ISBN 978-3-89645-940-4.
- Lanfry, J. (1968). Ghadamès: Etude linguistique et ethnographique. I, Textes, notes philologiques et ethnographiques. Fort-National: Fichier de documentation berbère.
- Lanfry, J. (1973). Ghadamès: Etude linguistique et ethnographique. II, Glossaire (parler des Ayt Waziten). [Fort-National]: Le fichier périodique.
