= Nafusi language =

Berber language spoken in Libya

Nafusi
- Ažbali; Mazoɣ / Maziɣ (Nafusi)
- Native to: Libya
- Region: Nafusa Mountains
- Native speakers: 300,000 (2020)
- Language family: Afro-Asiatic: Berber; Eastern (?); Nafusi
- Dialects: Jerbi; Zuwara; Tamezret
- Writing system: Arabic script

Language codes
- ISO 639-3: jbn
- Glottolog: nafu1238

Nafusi (also spelt Nefusi; in Nafusi: Ažbali or Maziɣ / Mazoɣ) is a Berber language spoken in the Nafusa Mountains (Adrar 'n Infusen), a large area in northwestern Libya. Its primary speakers are the Ibadi Muslim communities around Jadu, Nalut (Lalut), and Yafran.

The dialect of Yefren in the east differs somewhat from that of Nalut and Jadu in the west. Old Nafusi phrases appear in Ibadite manuscripts as early as the 12th century.

The dialect of Jadu is described in some detail in Beguinot (1931). Motylinski (1898) describes the dialect of Jadu and Nalut as spoken by a student from Yefren.

Nafusi shares several innovations with the Zenati languages, but unlike these Berber varieties, it preserves the initial vowel in words where Zenati has dropped it. For example: ufəs "hand" < *afus, rather than Zenati fus. It appears especially closely related to the Sokna and Siwi languages to its east.

== Phonology ==
=== Vowels ===
	Front	Central	Back
High	i		u
Mid	ɛ	ə	ɔ
Low		a	

- Vowels may also be shortened /ĭ, ɛ̆, ă, ɔ̆, ŭ/ or lengthened as /iː, ɛː, aː, ɔː, uː/.
- /a/ can also be heard as [æ, ɒ] and /u/ as [ʊ] in different environments.

=== Consonants ===
		Labial	Alveolar		Post-alv./ Palatal		Velar	Uvular	Pharyngeal	Glottal
		Labial	plain	phar.	plain	phar.	Velar	Uvular	Pharyngeal	Glottal
Plosive	voiceless		t	tˤ			k	q		ʔ
Plosive	voiced	b	d	dˤ			g			
Affricate	voiceless		ts		tʃ					
Affricate	voiced		dz	dzˤ	dʒ					
Fricative	voiceless	f	s	sˤ	ʃ			χ	ħ	h
Fricative	voiced		z	zˤ	ʒ	ʒˤ		ʁ	ʕ	
Nasal		m	n							
Lateral			l	ɫ						
Trill			r	rˤ						
Approximant		w			j					

== Works cited ==
- Basset, André (1934). "Note additionnelle". Revue des études islamiques. VIII.
- Beguinot, F. (1931). Il berbero Nefûsi di Fassâṭo. Grammatica. Testi raccolti dalla viva voce. Vocabolarietti. Roma: Istituto per l'Oriente.
- de Calassanti-Motylinski, A. (1898). Le Djebel Nefousa: transcription, traduction française et notes, avec une étude grammaticale. Paris: Ernest Leroux.
- Di Tolla, Anna Maria; Shinnib, Mohamed (2020). Grammatica di berbero nefusi. Ulrico Hoepli Editore. ISBN 9788820391836.
- Kossmann, Maarten (1999). Essai sur la phonologie du proto-berbère. Köln: Köppe. ISBN 9783896450357.
- Lewicki, Tadeusz (1934). "De quelques textes inédits en vieux berbère provenant d'une chronique ibāḍite anonyme". Revue des études islamiques. VIII.
- Provasi, Elio (1973). "Testi berberi di Žâdo (Tripolitania)". Annali dell'Istituto Orientale di Napoli (23): 503.
