= Sokna language =

Presumably extinct Eastern Berber language of Libya

Sokna
- Native to: Libya
- Region: Fezzan
- Extinct: 1960
- Language family: Afro-Asiatic: Berber; Eastern; Awjila–Sokna; Sokna
- Dialects: Sokna; Fezzan (Foqaha, Tmessa)

Language codes
- ISO 639-3: swn
- Glottolog: sawk1238
- ELP: Sawknah

Sokna (also Sawknah, Sukna) is a presumably extinct Eastern Berber language which was spoken in the town of Sokna (Isuknan) and the village of Fuqaha in northeastern Fezzan, Libya.

The most extensive and recent materials on it are Sarnelli (1924) for Sokna and Paradisi (1963) for El-Fogaha. Both articles report that the language was spoken only by a handful of old people at the time, so it is generally presumed to be extinct.

Aikhenvald & Militarev (1991), followed by Václav Blažek (1999) list Sokna and Fezzan as separate languages, and claim Sokna to have been also spoken in the oasis of Tmassa.
