= Eastern Berber languages =

Group of Berber languages spoken in Libya and Egypt

Eastern Berber
- Eastern Tamazight; Tamaziɣt tacerqit
- Geographic distribution: Libya (Ghadames, Fezzan, Awjila, Sokna, Fuqaha, Tmassa), Egypt (Siwa and Qara)
- Ethnicity: Oasis Berbers (including the Siwis and Infusen)
- Linguistic classification: Afro-Asiatic: Berber; Eastern Berber
- Subdivisions: Awjila; Ghadamès; Nafusi (?); Siwi; Sokna †

Language codes
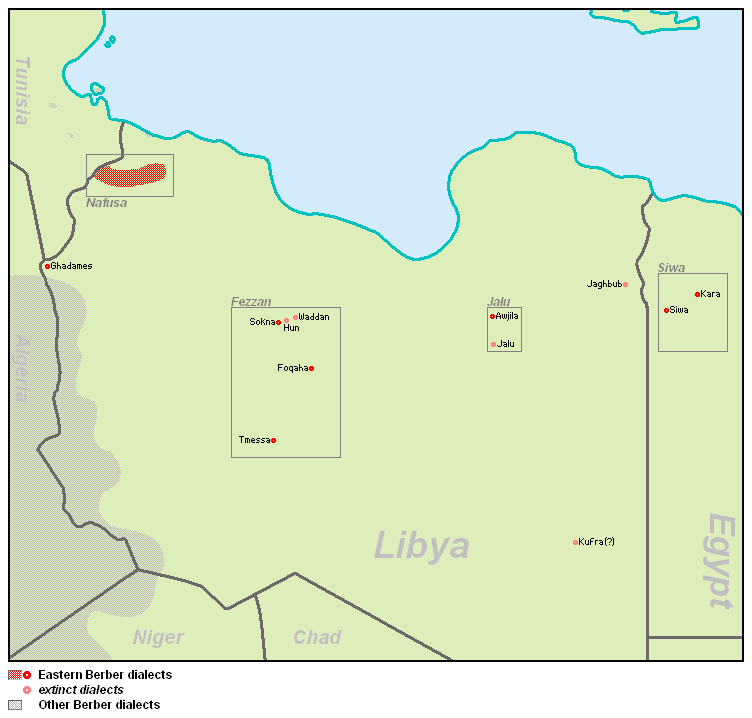

The Eastern Berber languages are a group of Berber languages spoken in Libya and Egypt. They include the Awjila, Sokna, Fezzan (El-Fogaha), Siwi, and Ghadamès languages, though it is not clear that they form a valid genealogical group.

== Classification ==
Kossmann (1999:29, 33) divides them into two groups:

- one consisting of Ghadamès and Awjila. These two languages are the only Berber languages to preserve proto-Berber *β as β; elsewhere in Berber it becomes h or disappears.
- the other consisting of Nafusi (excluding Zuwara and southern Tunisia), Sokna (El-Foqaha) and Siwi. This shares some innovations with Zenati, and others (e.g. the change of *ă to ə and the loss of *β) with Northern Berber in general.

An apparently spurious "Zurg" or "Kufra" language appears in some classification lists.
