= Awjila language =

Endangered Berber language of Libya

Awjila
- Jlan n Awilen
- Native to: Libya
- Region: Cyrenaica
- Native speakers: 2,700 (2020)
- Language family: Afro-Asiatic: Berber; Eastern; Awjila–Sokna; Awjila

Language codes
- ISO 639-3: auj
- Glottolog: awji1241
- ELP: Awjilah

Awjila (also Aujila, Augila, Aoudjila, Awgila, Awdjila; endonym: Jlan n Awilen) is a severely endangered (considered "moribund" by Ethnologue) Eastern Berber language spoken in Cyrenaica, Libya, in the Awjila oasis. Due to the political situation in Libya, immediate data on the language has been inaccessible. However, Facebook postings by speakers and younger semi-speakers have provided some recent supplementary data.

== General information ==
Awjila is a member of the Berber branch of the Afroasiatic language family, of the Eastern Berber subgroup. It is closely related to the extinct Sokna language of Libya and is considerably endangered, with an estimated 2,000–3,000 native speakers remaining. UNESCO considers Awjila to be seriously endangered as the youngest speakers have reached or passed middle age.

The Berber languages of Libya faced severe oppression during the period of Muammar Gaddafi, which has likely been the cause of the demise of some varieties such as Sokna and the endangerment of others, including Awjila and Ghadames. The usage of Berber/Amazigh languages was effectively prohibited, and Gaddafi completely denied the existence of the Imazighen people, reportedly saying, "call yourselves whatever you want inside your homes – Berbers, children of Satan, whatever – but you are only Libyans when you leave your homes". He denied the existence of Berbers as a separate ethnicity, and called Berbers a "product of colonialism" created by the West to divide Libya. He repeatedly targeted Amazigh rights activists (including linguists from abroad), to which can be attributed the lack of current and updated information on the Libyan Berber languages and the relatively limited content available, even in Arabic, on the Internet (as opposed to the more extensive resources found on Moroccan and Algerian Amazigh varieties). The language is, however, used on Facebook by some Awjili members.

== History of scholarship ==
Because of the political issues in Libya, field work on Awjila has been limited. The earliest studies of the language were carried out by Müller in 1827, however, his work is difficult to analyze because there were no standard conventions such as the International Phonetic Alphabet (IPA) for transcribing it at that time and because he failed to make distinctions for various sounds in Awjila (such the difference between as emphatic, pharyngeal consonants and their non-emphatic counterparts). Moritz von Beurmann also contributed a short word list but some forms contradict information found in later sources. The latest field work was done by Umberto Paradisi in 1960, whose data (in the form of texts) have become the basis for all future studies of the language, particularly that of contemporary scholar Marijn van Putten who has taken up the study of Awjila and other Eastern Berber varieties. Van Putten, who has published extensively on the language, relies heavily on the work of Paradisi and has used it to compile a dictionary and a grammar within his 2014 book A Grammar of Awjila Berber.

== Writing system ==
Although historically Libyco-Berber languages were written with the Tifinagh alphabet between second century BCE and third century CE, Aujila and other Amazigh languages have remained oral for most of their modern existence. In recent times most Amazigh languages are written in either Latin or Arabic script, although attempts to revive the Amazigh languages and cultures have led to the reintroduction of a "neo-Tifinagh" script in several domains. Nevertheless, Gaddafi had banned the script during the 42-years of his regime and therefore it is unlikely that the few Awjila speakers make any significant use of it.

== Phonology ==
Awjila has several interesting phonological features that set it apart from most other varieties of Berber. A few notable distinctions are listed below: (Van Putten)

1. Retention of Proto-Berber /β/ as the /v/ rather than being lost as in most other modern varieties.
2. Loss of the pharyngealized voiced dental stop and entirely replaced it with the voiceless variant. Example: Awjila avəṭ vs. Tachelhit: iḍ meaning night.
3. Retention of velar stop /k/ where most Berber varieties have replaced it with palatal approximant /j/. Example: Awjila: təkəmmušt vs. Tachelhit: taymmust meaning bundle
4. Palatalization of /s/ and /z/ to /ʃ/ (written as š) and /ʒ/ (written as ž)
5. Dominance of the /i/ vowel and seeming shift from the /a/ vowel of other varieties to i

== Morphology and syntax ==
Awjila also has several distinguishing features in the domains of morphology and syntax:

1. Lacks overt case-marking that has been retained in other Berber varieties.
2. Lacks clitic-fronting
3. Clitic –a is used with the present to express a resultative state, a feature shared only by the easternmost Berber variety, Siwa

== Status ==
Due to the already dwindled population of Awjila speakers and the continued political strife in post-Arab Spring Libya, the future of this language seems grim. Although researchers at the School of Oriental and African Studies (SOAS) and the president of the Congrès Mondial Amazigh have confirmed that speakers of the language still remain, all of the known speakers have been advanced in age, suggesting that younger generations are not learning Awjila.
