= Languages of Niger =

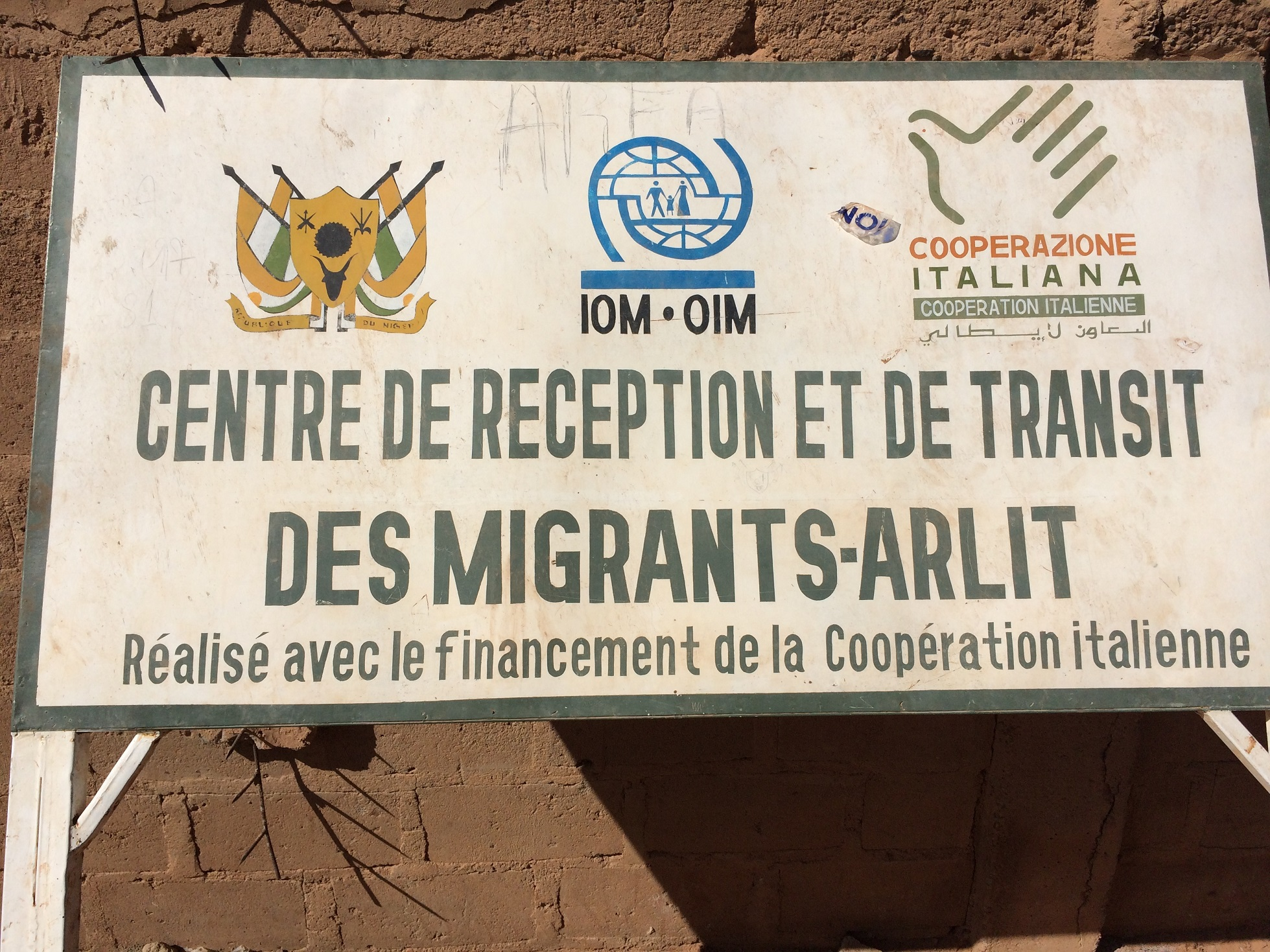
- French in use on an official sign in Niger in 2018
- Official: Hausa
- Minority: Arabic, Buduma, Fulfulde, Gourmanchéma, Kanuri, Zarma & Songhai, Tamasheq, Tassawaq, Tebu, Tetserret
- Foreign: English, French
- Signed: Francophone African Sign Language
- Keyboard layout: AZERTY

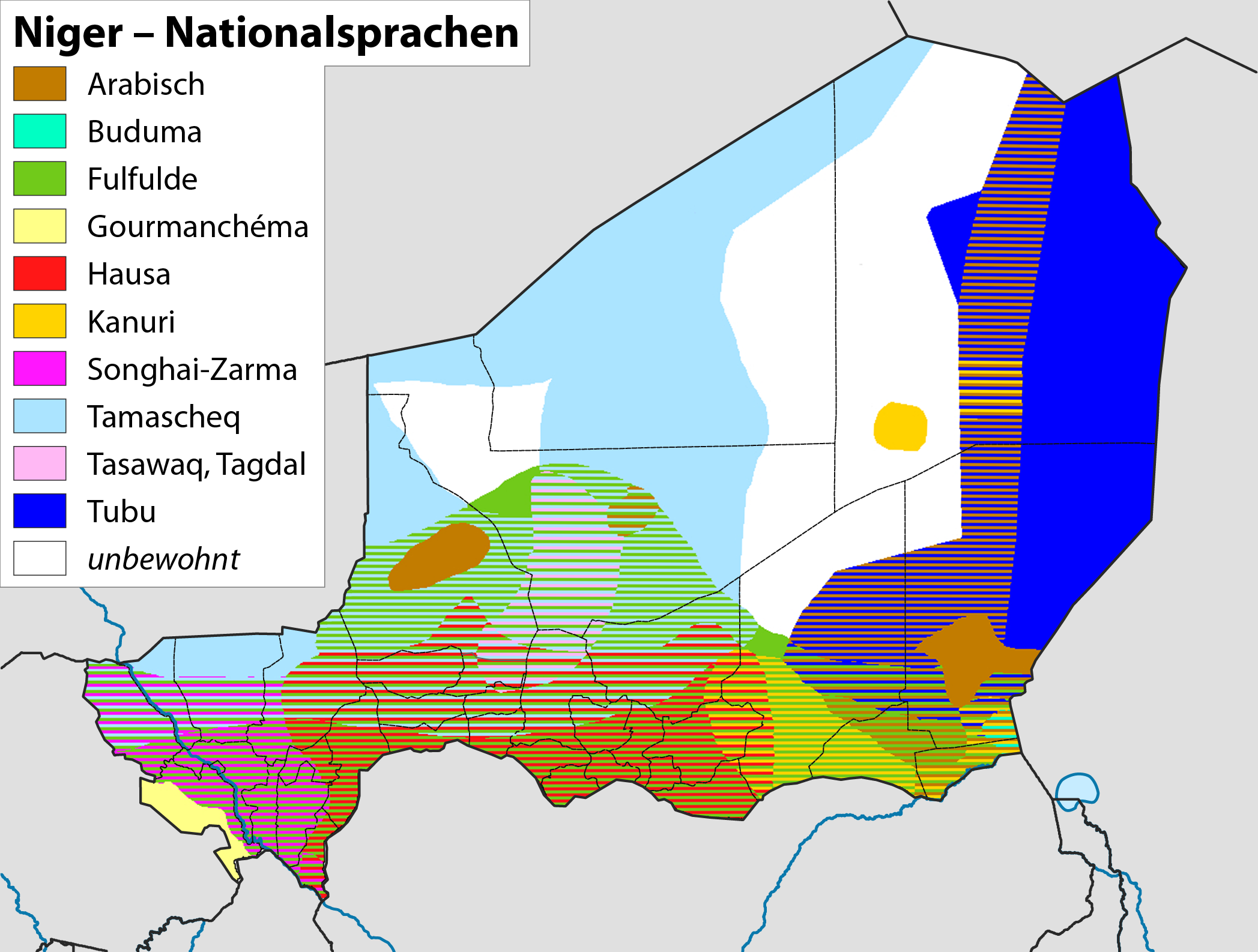
Ethnolinguistic map of Niger

The national and official language of Niger is Hausa. French served as the country's official language until 2025 when it was replaced with Hausa as per the transitional charter introduced under Abdourahamane Tiani.

Different sources estimate that Niger has between 8 and 20 indigenous languages, belonging to the Afroasiatic, Nilo-Saharan and Niger–Congo families – the discrepancy stems from the fact that several are closely related, and can be grouped together or considered apart.

== Official language ==
The sole official language of Niger is Hausa, which in 2025 replaced French, the previous official language.

French, inherited from the colonial period is spoken mainly as a second language by people who have received an education (20% of Nigeriens are literate in French, and even 47% in cities, growing quickly as literacy improves). Although educated Nigeriens still constitute a relatively small percentage of the population, the French language is the language used by the official administration (courts, government, etc.), the media and the business community. Niger is a member of the Parliamentary Assembly of the Francophonie. See also: African French

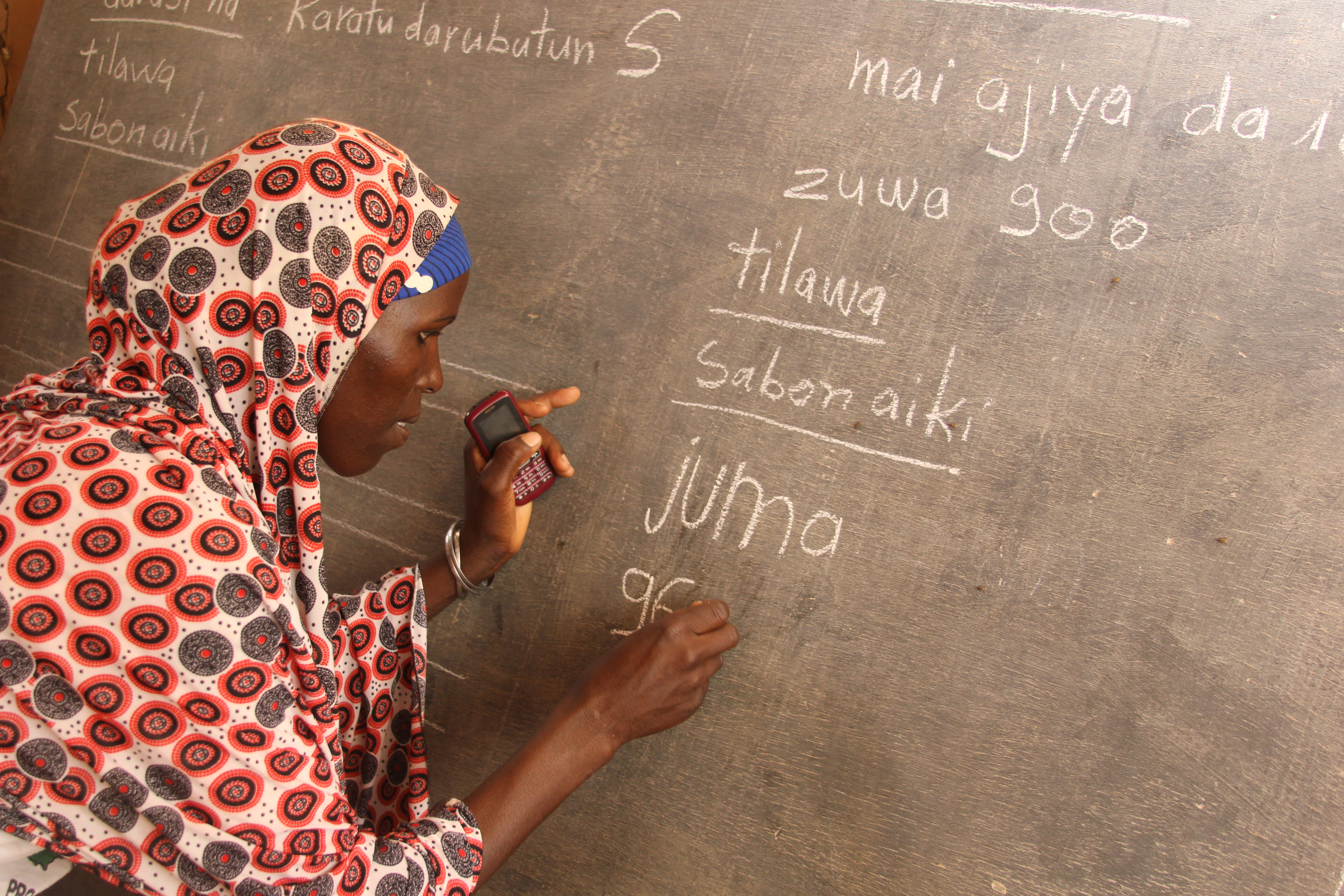
Woman writing on a blackboard in the Hausa language, southern Niger

Previously, it was listed that Niger had ten official national languages, namely Arabic, Buduma, Fulfulde, Gourmanchéma, Hausa, Kanuri, Zarma & Songhai, Tamasheq, Tassawaq, Tebu. However, the status of these languages was revoked later and not mentioned in the 2025 transitional charter introduced under Abdourahamane Tiani.

== List ==
Language	Family	Approx %	Main region	Notes
Hausa	Afro-Asiatic / Chadic	55.4%	South, central	Main trade language
Songhai	Songhay languages (Nilo-Saharan)	21%	Southwest	Zarma and Songhay are considered together
Tamasheq	Afro-Asiatic / Berber	9.3%	North	
Fulfulde	Niger–Congo / Atlantic	8.5%	All	Fulfulde of Western Niger & Central-Eastern Niger are considered together
Kanuri	Nilo-Saharan	4.7%	Southeast	
Arabic	Afro-Asiatic / Semitic	0.4%	Southeast	Particularly spoken by the Diffa Arabs mainly in the Diffa Region
Gourmanchéma	Niger–Congo / Gur	0.4%	Southwest corner	Spoken mainly by the Gurma people of southwest Niger
Tebu	Nilo-Saharan	0.4%	East	Spoken mainly by the Toubou people of Eastern Niger
Other	N/A	0.1%	Throughout	Any other languages

== Languages by number of speakers (according to Ethnologue) ==
Rank	Language	Speakers in Niger
1	Hausa	14,500,000
2	Zarma	3,590,000
3	French	2,506,000
4	Fulfulde, Central-Eastern Niger	450,000
5	Fulfulde, Western Niger	450,000
6	Tamajaq, Tawallammat	450,000
7	Kanuri, Manga	280,000
8	Tamajeq, Tayart	250,000
9	Kanuri, Yerwa	80,000
10	Dazaga	50,000
11	Kanuri, Tumari	40,000
12	Gourmanchéma	30,000
13	Tagdal	26,900
14	Kanuri, Bilma	20,000
15	Tamahaq, Tahaggart	20,000
16	Arabic, Hassaniyya	19,000
17	Arabic, Algerian Saharan Spoken	10,000
18	Tedaga	10,000
19	Arabic, Libyan Spoken	9,300
20	Arabic, Shuwa	9,300
21	Tasawaq	8,000
22	Arabic, Standard	7,800
23	Tetserret	2,000

== By Region ==
=== Dominant languages ===
Region	Languages
Agadez Region	Tuareg, Kanuri
Diffa Region	Kanuri
Dosso Region	Zarma
Maradi Region	Hausa
Niamey	Zarma
Tahoua Region	Hausa
Tillabéri Region	Zarma
Zinder Region	Hausa

== See also ==
- Demographics of Niger
