= Akoubounou =

Akoubounou Akabinu
- Village
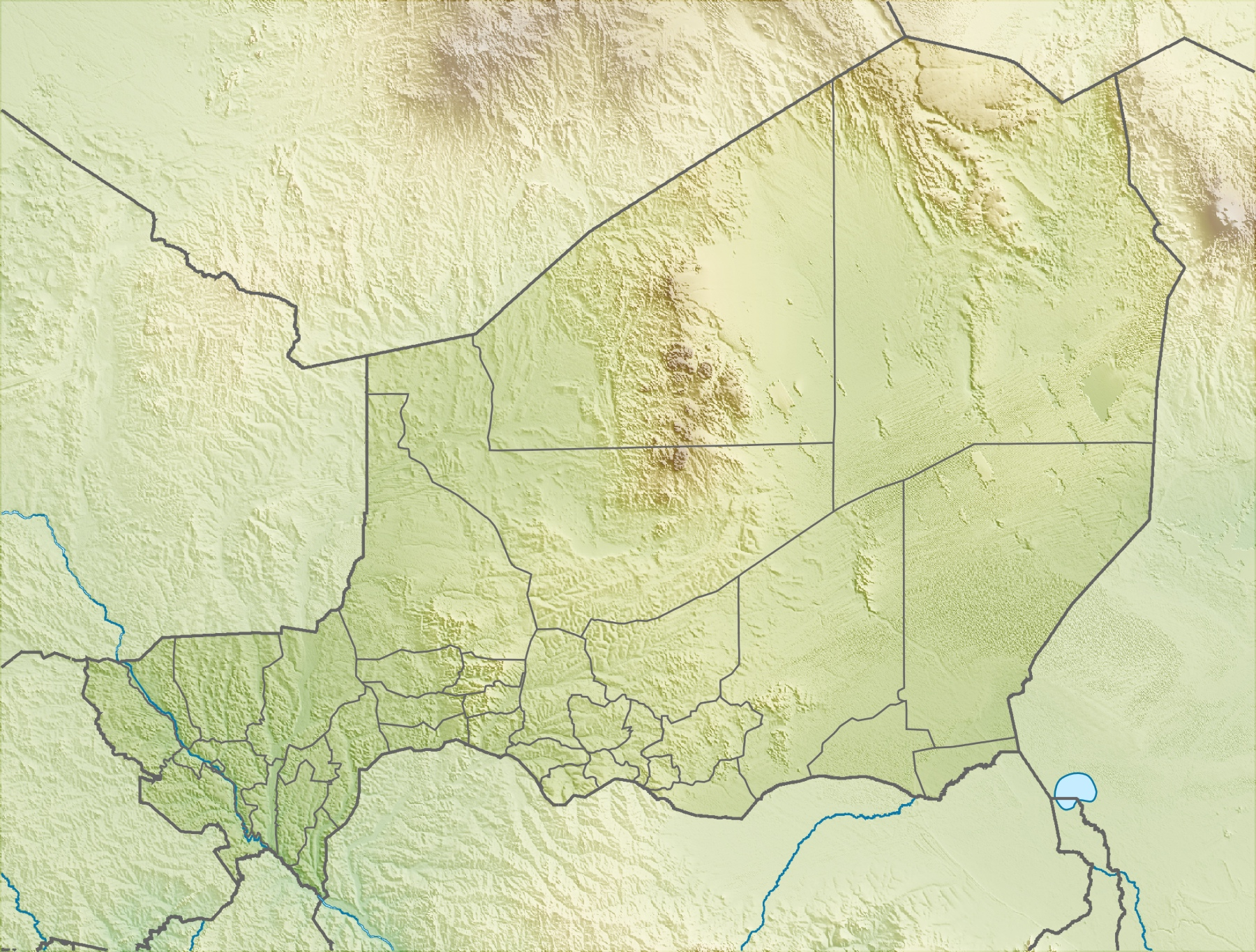
- Location within Niger
- Coordinates: 15°21′N 6°6′E
- Country: Niger
- Region: Tahoua
- Department: Abalak

Population (2012)
  - Total: 47,961

Akoubounou, or Akabinu in the local Tin Sert language, is a village located in the west to the town of Abalak, in the Tahoua Region of Niger.

== Geography ==
Akoubounou is located in the northern Sahel region. The neighbouring municipalities are Abalak in the Northeast, Azeye the southeast, Ibrohamane in the south, Tabalak the southwest and Kao in the northwest. The municipal area is divided into 17 administrative villages, 18 traditional villages, nine hamlets and three camps. The main village of the rural community is the administrative village of Akoubounou. The Tuareg tribe Ait-Awari also inhabits the village.

== History ==
The Akoubounou rural community emerged as part of a previously commune-free area in the course of a nationwide administrative reform in 2002.

At the 2001 census, Akoubounou had 10,348 inhabitants. At the 2012 census, the population was 47,961.

== Culture ==
Every two years, the camel festival called Shiriken takes place in Akoubounou, which celebrates the music, culture and traditions of the Tuareg people.

== Economy and infrastructure ==
The municipality lies at the crossroads of the Agropastoralism of the South and the zone of the pure pastoral economy of the North. Akoubounou runs through National Road 25 which links the village via Abalak to the regional capital Agadez and via Tabalak to the regional capital Tahoua.
