= Berber Latin alphabets =

Latin-based alphabet for the Berber languages

The Berber Latin alphabets (Berber languages: Agemmay Amaziɣ Alatin) are any the adaptations of the Latin script used to write the Berber languages. The first was created in the 19th century.

== History ==
The Berber languages were originally written using the ancient Libyco-Berber script and then centuries later by the Tuareg Tifinagh script in Tuareg language areas, of which the Neo-Tifinagh alphabet/abjad is the modern development.

The use of a Latin script for Berber has its roots in European (French and Italian) colonial expeditions to North Africa. Dictionaries and glossaries written with Latin letters, ordered alphabetically and following European orthography (mainly French) began to appear in print in the 19th century, they were intended to the colonial administration, traders and military officers. With the arrival of linguists specialized in Semitic languages there emerged a system based on Semitic romanization conventions: diacritics were used, and dictionary entries were now ordered by root. This system has since become the most common way of Berber transcription in scientific documents and literature.

Various writing standards were used since the 19th century, some are phonetically oriented, other phonologically oriented. While the Tuareg languages use a phonetically oriented transcription, the northern Berber languages use on the other hand a mixed transcription, the latter is recommended by the French institute of languages, INALCO and has been adopted by the HCA in Algeria and IRCAM in Morocco (although in Neo-Tifinagh).

== Northern-Berber Latin alphabets ==
The Latin alphabets of Northern Berber languages usually consist of 35 letters:

- 24 basic Latin letters, all found in the English alphabet except for P, O and V. However, these three are also used by some in modern Berber texts in loanwords and borrowings.
- 11 additional modified Latin letters: Č Ḍ Ɛ Ǧ Ɣ Ḥ Ř Ṛ Ṣ Ṭ Ẓ.
- The labialization mark ⟨ʷ⟩ is added to some letters in some Berber languages, producing: bʷ, gʷ, ɣʷ, kʷ, mʷ, nʷ, qʷ, and xʷ. However, these are usually not considered as independent letters of the alphabet.

35-letter Northern-Berber alphabet
A	B	C	Č	D	Ḍ	E	Ɛ	F	G	Ǧ	Ɣ	H	Ḥ	I	J	K	L	M	N	O	Q	R	Ř	Ṛ	S	Ṣ	T	Ṭ	U	W	X	Y	Z	Ẓ
Lower case
a	b	c	č	d	ḍ	e	ɛ	f	g	ǧ	ɣ	h	ḥ	i	j	k	l	m	n	o	q	r	ř	ṛ	s	ṣ	t	ṭ	u	w	x	y	z	ẓ

In Northern-Berber texts, foreign words and names are written in their original form even if they contain the letters: O, P, V, or any other non-Berber letter (like Ñ).

According to the Unicode CLDR, the letter P is used in Kabyle.

== Latin alphabets and Tifinagh ==
The following table shows a typical Northern-Berber Latin alphabet with its Neo-Tifinagh and Arabic equivalents:

Berber-Latin		IRCAM's Tifinagh equivalent	Arabic equivalent	IPA equivalent	Similar sound in other languages
1	A a	ⴰ	أ / ا / َ	æ	By default like English a in "map". When there is an emphatic Berber consonant then the Berber "a" is pronounced like the English a in "car".
2	B b	ⴱ	ب	b or β	English b or a soft Spanish b / v
3	C c	ⵛ	ش	ʃ	English sh in "ship"
4	Č č (tc)	ⵞ	تش (چ)	t͡ʃ	English ch in "China"
5	D d	ⴷ	د / ذ	d or ð	English d as well as English th in "this"
6	Ḍ ḍ	ⴹ	ض / ظ	ðˤ	Thick English d in "dish" or "door". Emphatic d
7	E e	ⴻ	ـ / ۍ	ə	English unstressed a in "attack".
8	Ɛ ɛ	ⵄ	ع	ʕ	‘ayn (voiced equivalent of ḥ, similar to English onomatopoeia for retching)
9	F f	ⴼ	ف	f	English f
10	G g	ⴳ	ݣ (گ)	ɡ	English g in "gate" or "gold"
11	Ǧ ǧ (dj)	ⴵ	ج	d͡ʒ	English j in "joke" or English g in "George"
12	Ɣ ɣ (gh)	ⵖ	غ	ɣ~ʁ	like French / German r or between this sound and Spanish intervocalic g
13	H h	ⵀ	هـ	h	Strong English h in "hello" or "hold"
14	Ḥ ḥ	ⵃ	ح	ħ	Arabic ḥ in Muḥammad (stronger than h, similar to English onomatopoeia for being cold)
15	I i	ⵉ	ي / ِ	i	English ee like in "sheet" or English i in "hidden".
16	J j	ⵊ	(ج)	ʒ	English s in "measure" or "television", or English j in "déjà-vu".
17	K k	ⴽ	(ک)	k	English k
18	L l	ⵍ	ل	l or ɫ	usually British English clear L in "light" (as in French, Spanish, German)
19	M m	ⵎ	م	m	English m
20	N n	ⵏ	ن	n	English n
21	Q q	ⵇ	ق	q, qʷ or ɢ	like k, but deeper in the throat
22	R r	ⵔ	ر	r, rˤ	Spanish or Italian r
23	Ř ř	ⵔ	ر	ɺ	Soft Italian/Spanish r, but even softer, almost l
24	Ṛ ṛ	ⵕ	ڕ	rˤ	Thick emphatic Spanish r
25	S s	ⵙ	س	s	English s in "seed"
26	Ṣ ṣ	ⵚ	ص	sˤ	Thick English s as in "sold". Emphatic s
27	T t	ⵜ	ت / ث	t or θ	English t in "tea", as well as English th in "thought"
28	Ṭ ṭ	ⵟ	ط	tˤ	Thick English "t" in "toll". Emphatic t
29	U u	ⵓ	و / ُ	ʊ	English u in "put" or "rule"
30	W w	ⵡ	وْ	w	English w
31	X x	ⵅ	خ	x~χ	German / Dutch ch in "Nacht", European Spanish j
32	Y y	ⵢ	يْ	j	English y in "yes" or "yard"
33	Z z	ⵣ	ز	z	English z in "zoo"
34	Ẓ ẓ	ⵥ	(ژ)	zˤ	Thick English z in "Zorro". Emphatic z

The letter "O" does occur often in Tuareg-Berber orthography and sometimes in Northern Berber. In Northern-Berber orthography it usually corresponds to the letter "U".

In the interest of pan-dialectal legibility, the Berber Latin alphabet omits the partly phonemic contrasts found in some Berber language varieties (notably the Kabyle language and Riffian Berber) between stops and fricatives.

Phonemic labiovelarization of consonants is widespread in Berber varieties, but there are rarely minimal pairs and it is unstable (e.g. ameqqʷran "large", in the Ainsi dialect of Kabyle, is pronounced ameqqran in At Yanni Kabyle-Berber, only a few kilometers away). The INALCO standard uses the diacritic ⟨ᵒ⟩ for labiovelarization only when needed to distinguish words, e.g. ireggel vs. ireggᵒel.

Labiovelars
North-Berber Latin letter	Tifinagh equivalent	IPA equivalent
Bʷ bʷ / Bᵒ bᵒ	ⴱⵯ	bʷ
Gʷ gʷ / Gᵒ gᵒ	ⴳⵯ	ɡʷ
Ɣʷ ɣʷ / Ɣᵒ ɣᵒ	ⵖⵯ	ɣʷ
Kʷ kʷ / Kᵒ kᵒ	ⴽⵯ	kʷ
Qʷ qʷ / Qᵒ qᵒ	ⵇⵯ	qʷ
Xʷ xʷ / Xᵒ xᵒ	ⵅⵯ	xʷ
Mʷ mʷ / Mᵒ mᵒ	ⵎⵯ	mʷ

The letter ⟨ṛ⟩ is used for [rˤ] only when it contrasts with ⟨r⟩ (e.g. ṛwiɣ "I am satisfied" vs. rwiɣ "I am moved"). In all other cases ⟨r⟩ is used, e.g. tarakna "carpet" (pronounced taṛakna). This is because [rˤ] is often an allophone of /r/ in the environment of other emphatics, and it rarely contrasts with /r/ otherwise. Exceptional cases of other emphatics, e.g. [ʊʃˤːæj] "hound", are ignored (i.e. written as uccay).

=== Tarifit alphabet ===
In most Tarifit varieties (northern Morocco), historical /l/ has shifted to /ř/ in many words. Its pronunciation varies by dialect and can be a tap /ɾ/, a trill /r/, or a sound between /l/ and /r/ (/ɺ/). For example, ul ("heart") in other Berber languages becomes uř in Tarifit. The geminated equivalent, historical /ll/, has shifted to /dʒː/, so yelli ("my daughter") becomes yeǧi. The cluster /lt/ has shifted to /tʃ/, as in wečma ("my sister") from weltma. Depending on the author's whim, /dʒː/ may be written as ll, dj, ǧ, or ǧǧ, and /tʃ/ may be written as lt, tc, or č.

Riffian letter	Riffian word	The word in other Berber dialects	meaning in English
Ř ř	uř	ul	heart
Ř ř	aɣyuř	aɣyul	donkey
Ř ř	awař	awal	speech / talk
Ǧ ǧ	azeǧif	azellif	head
Ǧ ǧ	yeǧa	yella	(he) is / (he) exists
Ǧ ǧ	ajeǧiđ	agellid	king
Č č	wečma	weltma	my sister
Č č	tacemřač	tacemlalt	white
Č č	taɣyuč	taɣyult	female donkey (jenny)

=== Shilha alphabet ===
In Shilha (mid-southern Morocco), Berber writers rarely use the neutral vowel e, because the allophonic schwa is rarer in Tachelhit due to a different stress system than its sister languages.

=== Kabyle alphabet ===
In Kabyle (northeastern Algeria), the affricates /t͡s, d͡z/ have been notated as ⟨ţ, z̧⟩ for over thirty years. However these affricates are uncommon in other dialects (except in Riffian) and they are morphologically conditioned, so for the sake of pan-dialectal legibility the INALCO standard omits them. In Kabyle the affricate [t͡s] may derive from underlying /tt/ or /ss/. In the former case the INALCO standard uses ⟨tt⟩, and in the second it uses ⟨ss⟩ (e.g. yettawi vs. ifessi deriving from the verb fsi).

Unofficial usage (Kabyle)
Character	INALCO equivalent	IRCAM Tifinagh equivalent	IPA equivalent	Pronunciation
Ţ ţ	Tt tt	ⵜⵙ	t͡s	ts like in "Tsetse fly"
Ţ ţ	Ss ss	ⵜⵙ	t͡s	ts like in "Tsetse fly"
Z̧ z̧	Zz zz	ⴷⵣ	d͡z	dz / the English "ds" in words

Labiovelarization is indicated with a superscript letter w or o (examples: kkʷ, ggʷ or kkᵒ, ggᵒ); in the latter case the o may combine with the letter (kͦkͦ, gͦgͦ). Many authors simply use the letter w (kkw, ggw). ⟨ḇ ḏ ǥ ḵ ṯ⟩ may represent spirantization.

On the internet, it is common to replace the Latinized Greek epsilon and gamma, ⟨Ɛɛ⟩ and ⟨Ɣɣ⟩, with actual Greek letters:

- ⟨Σ⟩, Greek upper case sigma, since Greek upper case epsilon "Ε" is visually indistinguishable from Latin upper case E
- ⟨ε⟩, Greek small letter epsilon (Unicode U+03B5)
- ⟨Γ, γ⟩ Greek capital and small letter gamma (Unicode U+0393, U+03B3)

Among non-Kabyle Berber writers a number of alternative letters are used:

Unofficial / alternative letters
Character	INALCO equivalent
Â â	Ɛ ɛ
Ġ ġ	Ɣ ɣ
Gh gh	Ɣ ɣ
Dj	Ǧ ǧ

=== Controversy ===
There has been a long and fierce debate on whether to use the Latin, Tifinagh, or Arabic script for Berber in Algeria and Morocco, between Berber activists and anti-Berber establishments, mainly those with an Arab-Islamic orientation. Berber activists overwhelmingly favor the use of the Latin alphabet in order to ensure a quick development and proliferation of the Berber language (Tamazight) in schools, in public institutions, and on the internet. A small number of them prefer the Neo-Tifinagh alphabet. The states of Morocco and Algeria usually distance themselves from Latin-based Berber writing, fearing that it would strengthen the position of Berber against Arabic and French, and thus leading to a stronger Berber political activism. The Arab-Islamic establishments and political parties often reject the Latin alphabet as a Berber alphabet for the same reasons, and they usually brand it as a tool to westernize and Christianize Berbers.

In 2003, Mohammed VI of Morocco approved the Royal Institute of the Amazigh Culture (IRCAM) Berber Institute's decision of using Neo-Tifinagh as the sole official alphabet for the Berber language in Morocco. The IRCAM's decision was met with much disapproval among independent Berber activists and they saw it as a way of neutralizing Berber and preventing it from quick flourishing and development.

== Southern-Berber Latin alphabets (Tuareg) ==
The Southern-Berber (Tuareg) Latin alphabet is made of 36 letters. They are mostly Latin letters with one IPA character and one Greek letter incorporated.

The vowel O is used in the Latin alphabet of Southern Berber (Tuareg), but is also used in some (but not all) Northern Berber languages. The vowel "O" in Tuareg words mostly corresponds to "U" in Northern Berber words.

Unidentified 37-Letter Latin alphabet for Tuareg
A	Ă	B	Ḅ	D	Ḍ	E	Ǝ	F	G	Ɣ	H	Ḥ	I	J	K	L	Ḷ	M	N	Ŋ	O	Q	R	S	Ṣ	Š	T	Ṭ	U	W	X	Y	Z	Ž	Ẓ	Γ
a	ă	b	ḅ	d	ḍ	e	ǝ	f	g	ɣ	h	ḥ	i	j	k	l	ḷ	m	n	ŋ	o	q	r	s	ṣ	š	t	ṭ	u	w	x	y	z	ž	ẓ	ʕ

37-Letter Latin alphabet for Tuareg-Berber (Tamahaq), official in Niger since 1999
A	Ă	Ǝ	B	C	D	Ḍ	E	F	G	Ǧ	H	I	J	J̌	Ɣ	K	L	Ḷ	M	N	Ŋ	O	P	Q	R	S	Ṣ	Š	T	Ṭ	U	W	X	Y	Z	Ẓ
a	ă	ǝ	b	c	d	ḍ	e	f	g	ǧ	h	i	j	ǰ	ɣ	k	l	ḷ	m	n	ŋ	o	p	q	r	s	ṣ	š	t	ṭ	u	w	x	y	z	ẓ

The Malian national literacy program DNAFLA has proposed a standard for the Latin alphabet, which is used with modifications in Karl G. Prasse's Tuareg French Dictionary and the government literacy program in Burkina. In Niger a slightly different system was used. There is also some variation in Tifinagh and in the Arabic script.

The DNAFLA system is a somewhat morphophonemic orthography, not indicating initial vowel shortening, always writing the directional particle as ⟨dd⟩, and not indication all assimilations (e.g. ⟨Tămašăɣt⟩ for tămašăq.

In Burkina Faso the emphatics are denoted by "hooked" letters, as in Fula, e.g. ⟨ɗ ƭ⟩.

== See also ==
- Tifinagh

== Bibliography ==
- "Initiation à la langue amazighe" (PDF) (in French). IRCAM. 2004. Archived from the original (PDF) on 24 January 2011.
- (in French) Tira n Tmaziɣt: Propositions pour la notation usuelle à base latine du berbère (Atelier du 24–25 June 1996, INALCO/CRB; synthèse des travaux par S. Chaker), Études et documents berbères, 14, 1997, p. 239–253.
- Kamal Nait-Zerrad. Grammaire moderne du kabyle, tajerrumt tatrart n teqbaylit. Éditions KARTHALA, 2001. ISBN 978-2-84586-172-5
- Kessai, Fodil (2018). "Élaboration d'un dictionnaire électronique de berbère avec annotations étymologiques". F. Kessai.
- Sudlow, David (2001). The Tamasheq of North-East Burkina Faso. Rüdiger Köppe Verlag. ISBN 3896453807. Archived from the original on 7 June 2010.
- Tas, Idir (2025). Le kabyle en quelques règles, Paris, 2025 ISBN 2312149796
