= Western Berber languages =

Berber branch spoken in Mauritania and Niger

Western Berber
- Western Tamazight; Tamaziɣt taɣerbit
- Geographic distribution: Mederdra (Mauritania), Akoubounou (Niger)
- Ethnicity: Iznagen, Tuaregs (Ait-Awari, Kel Eghlal)
- Linguistic classification: Afro-Asiatic: Berber; Western Berber
- Subdivisions: Tetserret; Zenaga

Language codes
- Glottolog: west2724

The Western Berber languages are a branch of the Berber languages. They comprise two languages:

- Zenaga
- Tetserret

Zenaga is spoken in southwestern Mauritania while Tetserret is spoken in central Niger. They appear to have influenced the Algerian Songhai language Korandje.

The label "Western Berber" was first used in a classificatory sense by Aikhenvald and Militarev (1984) in reference to Zenaga alone; Tetserret data was not available to them.

Sound changes characteristic of this subgroup include the reflex of proto-Berber *ww as *bb (elsewhere gg/ggʷ) and *w (elsewhere retained) as *b after consonants; of *x (elsewhere retained) as *k; of *ṭṭ as ḍḍ (elsewhere ṭṭ); and of *ẓ as a voiceless fricative ṣ (Tetserrét) or θ̣ (Zenaga).

== Substrate influences ==
Roger Blench (2024) hypothesizes that many animal names from Zenaga, Tetserret, and also Tuarag may have been derived from extinct languages of unknown genetic affiliation that were spoken by foragers.
