= Tetserret language =

Western Berber language of Niger

Tetserret
- Tin Sert
- Tətsərret
- Native to: Niger
- Region: Sahara
- Ethnicity: Ait-Awari
- Native speakers: 2,000 (2017)
- Language family: Afro-Asiatic: Berber; Western; Tetserret
- Writing system: Unwritten

Language codes
- ISO 639-3: tez
- Glottolog: tets1235
- ELP: Tetserret
- Tetserret is classified as Severely Endangered by the UNESCO Atlas of the World's Languages in Danger

Tetserret (Tin-Sert) is a Western Berber language spoken by the Ait-Awari and Kel Eghlal Tuareg tribes of the Akoubounou (Akabinu) commune in Niger. This main speech area is located between Abalak, Akoubounou and Shadwanka. The variant spoken by the Kel Eghlal is called taməsəɣlalt. The Tamasheq equivalent šin-sart / šin-sar / tin-sar is used in some older literature. Popular understanding among some Ait-Awari derives the name tet-serret, and its Tamasheq equivalent šin-sart, from expressions meaning 'the (language) of Sirte'.

== Language ==
Tetserret is one of the last Berber languages to be recognised as distinct. As late as 1981, Bernus treated Tetserret as a dialect of Tuareg, and some early sources even confused it with the Northern Songhay languages. The first published linguistic material on Tetserret was Drouin (1984), and only with Khamed Attayoub's (2001) thesis did it become clear how different Tetserret was from Tuareg.

Tetserret is the only surviving Berber language to share a number of sound shifts with Zenaga of Mauritania. It also has non-Tuareg vocabulary found in other Berber languages. For example, afagan (man) resembles Shilha and Central Atlas Tamazight of Morocco; ayddid (goatskin container for water) resembles Ghadames of Libya; and awdoš (ox) recalls Hassaniya Arabic.

All speakers of Tetserret are bilingual in the Tawellemmet language, which has influenced their language. As of 2011, Tetserret was no longer being spoken with children, and as such appears endangered.

The language holds a certain level of prestige in its community, as a tool of spreading religion, such as it is 'almost a sin not to speak it', it is hard to evaluate the number of 'true' speakers, because there is a great shame in not speaking it within the community, leading to respondents exaggerating their knowledge of the language.

== Literature ==
- Drouin, Jeannine. 1984. Nouveaux éléments de sociolinguistique touarègue. Un parler méridional nigérien, la tamasaghlalt. Paris Groupe Linguistique d'Études Chamito-Sémitiques, G.L.E.C.S., XXIV-XXVIII (1979–1984), Geuthner, pp. 507–520.
- Attayoub, Abdoulmohamine Khamed (2001), La tətsərret des Ayttawari Seslem : identification socio-linguistique d'un parler berbère non-documenté chez les touaregs de l'Azawagh (Niger), Mémoire de maîtrise dirigé par Salem Chaker, Paris: Inalco
- Khamed Attayoub, Abdoulmohamine. Les mots du voyages chez les Touaregs Ayttawari Seslem. Quelques éléments lexicologues en tetserrét. In ed. H. Claudot-Hawad, Voyager du point de vue d'un nomade. Paris: Éditions Paris-Méditérranée, pp. 159–166.
- Lux, Cécile (2011). Etude descriptive et comparative d’une langue menacée : le tetserret, langue berbère du Niger (Doctoral thesis). Université de Lyon-2.
- Walentowitz, Saskia; Attayoub, Abdoulmohamine Khamed (2001), "La tetserrét des Ayttawari Seslem: un parler proche du berbère "septentrionale" chez les Touaregs de l'Azawagh (Niger)", Annuaire de l'Afrique du Nord (PDF), vol. XXIX, archived from the original on 2011-07-21
