= Wellemmedan =

Wellemmedan may refer to:

- the Wellemmedan people
- the Wellemmedan language
