= Tamasheq language =

Tuareg Berber macro-language of North Africa

Tamasheq
- Tamashek, Tamachen, Tamashekin, Tamachek, Tomacheck
- Tafaghist
- Native to: Mali, Burkina Faso
- Region: Sahara
- Ethnicity: Tuareg
- Native speakers: 900,000 (2021–2022)
- Language family: Afro-Asiatic: Berber; Tuareg; Southern; Tamasheq
- Dialects: Tadhaq; Tanaslamt
- Writing system: Latin; Tifinagh; Arabic (Innislamen)

Official status
- Official language in: Mali

Language codes
- ISO 639-3: taq
- Glottolog: tama1365

Tamashek or Tamasheq is a variety of Tuareg, a Berber macro-language widely spoken by nomadic tribes across North and West Africa in Algeria, Mali, Niger, and Burkina Faso. Tamasheq is one of the three main varieties of Tuareg, the others being Tamajaq (Air Tamajeq and Tawellemmet) and Tamahaq.

Tamashek is spoken mostly in Mali, especially in its central region including Timbuktu, Kidal, and Gao. It is also spoken by a sizeable population in Burkina Faso where it is spoken by 187,000 people as of 2021. As of 2022, approximately 900,000 people speak Tamashek, with the majority of speakers residing in Mali with approximately 590,000 speakers. The livelihood of the Tuareg people has been under threat in the last century, due to climate change and a series of political conflicts, notably the Arab-Tuareg rebellion of 1990–1995 in Mali which resulted in ethnic cleansing of the Tuareg in the form of reprisal killings and exile. Tamashek is currently classified as a developing language (5), partly due to the Malian government's active promotion of the language; it is currently taught in public education, from primary schools to adult literacy classes.

Tamashek is often understood in Mali as a term that denotes all Tuareg varieties. Other alternative names for Tamashek include Tamachen, Tamashekin, and Tomacheck.

== Dialect divisions of Malian Tamashek ==
There are divergent views regarding Tamashek's dialect divisions. Some report two main dialects, named Timbuktu and Tadhaq.

Others take there to be roughly three main divisions of Malian Tamashek:

1. Kal Ansar dialects around Timbuktu (denoted 'T-Ka')
2. "mainstream" Tamashek dialects spoken in Kidal, Tessalit, the Gao area, and the non-Kal Ansar groups around Timbuktu
3. dialects spoken by certain groups in the Gourma of Gao and Ansongo

== Phonology ==
=== Vowels ===
The Tamasheq language has seven vowels in total: two frontal vowels /i/, /e/; three central vowels /ə/, /æ/, /a/; and two back vowels /u/, /o/. There are two short vowels, /ə/ and /æ/, where /ə/ may be elided in some contexts, and /æ/ is always short but may be phonetically realized as a sound ranging from [æ] to [a], distinguished from /a/ which is always [ɑː]. There are no other distinctions between vowels which are primarily length-based. Tamasheq has no diphthongs.

Short Vowels
	Front	Central	Back
High		ə	
Low		æ	

Full (Long) Vowels
	Front	Central	Back
High	i		u
Mid	e		o
Low		a	

While all vowels occur word-initially and word-medially, only full vowels occur word-finally.

=== Consonants ===
Tamasheq has 33 consonants, featuring six manners of articulation and eight places of articulation. There are no non-pulmonic consonants. The consonants are detailed in the table below.

		Labial	Alveolar		Palatal (-alveolar)	Velar	Uvular	Pharyngeal	Laryngeal
		Labial	plain	phar.	Palatal (-alveolar)	Velar	Uvular	Pharyngeal	Laryngeal
Nasal		m	n		ɲ	ŋ			
Plosive/ Affricate	voiceless	(p)	t	(tˤ)	tʃ	k	(q)		(ʔ)
Plosive/ Affricate	voiced	b	d	dˤ	gʲ	g			
Fricative	voiceless	f	s	(sˤ)	ʃ		χ	(ħ)	h
Fricative	voiced		z	zˤ	ʒ		ʁ	(ʕ)	
Sonorant	median	w	r		j				
Sonorant	lateral		l	(ɫ)					

The table places the two laryngeal consonants, and /h/ and /ʔ/, according to the IPA chart (the source did not specify their manners of articulation).

Consonants in a single parenthesis are of marginal use, "confined largely to loanwords." Consonants of Arabic origins – /sˤ/, /ɫ/, /ħ/, /ʕ/, and /ʔ/ – occur in Arabic loanwords. The glottal stop /ʔ/ is already largely absent in local Arabic dialects, is thus only found in unassimilated Islamic vocabulary.

Consonants in a double parenthesis occur mostly as geminated versions of other consonants. A uvular stop /q/ principally occurs in the geminated form /qq/, which can be interpreted as the "phonetic realization of geminated /ɣɣ/".

=== Accent ===
Accent is an "important feature of Tamasheq". The role of accent is "very different" for verbs and nouns. For nouns and other non-verb stems, accent is lexically determined. This is not the case for verbs. According to the rule called "default accentuation", the accent falls on the antepenult or on the leftmost syllable of verbs. The exception to the rule is resultative and long imperfect positive stems.

For example, a-bæ̀mbæra, which means Bambara, has its primary accent on the antepenult syllable. A bisyllabic word hæ̀ræt, which is glossed as 'thing,' has its accent on the initial syllable.

== Morphology ==
Tamasheq's two main morphological processes are ablaut and affixation, with the former permeating the language. Many processes also undergo a combination of the two.

=== Derivational morphology ===
Most of Tamasheq nouns are underived, although some are derived by "some combination of ablaut and prefixation." For example, the noun t-æ-s-ȁnan-t, which means 'oxpecker,' is prefixally derived from the causative verb æ̀ss-onæn 'tame, break in animal' with its -s- prefix.

In Tamasheq, nearly all "modifying adjectives" are participles of inflected intransitive verbs. For example, the verb 'to ripen' is əŋŋá, and it is inflected into participles such as i-ŋŋá-n (MaSg) or t-əŋŋá-t (FeSg). These resultative participles are used with "adjectival" sense, adjectivalized into the word 'ripened'.

=== Nominal morphology ===
==== Gender and number ====
Gender and number are mainly marked using affixation, though in many cases they use ablaut or a combination of both.

Most nouns, regardless of gender, have vocalic prefixes, varying between -æ-/-ə, -a-, or -e- for the singular, and invariable i- in the plural. Some nouns entirely lack a vocalic prefix, e.g. deké ('basket').

Feminine nouns are additionally marked by the Fe[minine] prefix t-. For feminine singular nouns, suffix -t is required to denote singularity, thus we see a circumfix t-...-t. In cases where the stem ends in a vowel, however, an additional inner Fe suffix -t- is added before the outer suffix, thus the affix frame becomes t-...-t-t.

In addition to the plural vocalic prefix -i-, pluralization of nouns requires gender-based suffixation: for feminine plural nouns, suffix -en or -ten is added, while for masculine nouns Ma[sculine] suffix -æn or -tæn is added. In some cases, a noun pluralizes by stem ablaut without suffixation; one example of unsuffixed plural ablaut is æ̀-ɣata ('crocodile'), which is pluralized to ì-ɣata.

The table below illustrates the idealized morphological rules of gender and number marking explained so far:

	singular		plural	
	typical rule	example	typical rule	example
masculine	{-æ-/-ə, -a-, or -e-} {SG prefix}	æxxú 'monster'	-i- + {-æn or -tæn} {PL prefix} {} {MASC.PL suffix}	i-xxú-tæn 'monsters'
feminine	{-æ-/-ə, -a-, or -e-} + {t-...-(t)t} {SG prefix} {} {FEM circumfix}	t-æ-s-ȁnan-t 'oxpecker'	-i- + {-en or -ten} {PL prefix} {} {FEM.PL suffix}	t-i-s-ànan-en 'oxpeckers'

==== Compounding ====
Tamasheq makes use of compounding to form nouns. Most noun-noun compounds necessitate a possessor preposition ə̀n in between the two morphemes, which can be analytically structured as [X [ə̀n Y]] 'X of Y.' Depending on the nouns, ə̀n may become unaccented, as shown in the first example below.

Compounding Examples
Compounding Type	Example
Noun + Noun	t-e-fæ̏tel-t ən bə́t̩ron F-SG-lamp-F.SG POSS gasoline 'gas lamp'
Verb + Noun	kæ̀wkæw í-ɣbab peck PL-tree.hole 'woodpecker'
Adjective + Noun	èrk hæræt bad thing.SG 'a bad thing'

=== Verbal morphology ===
Ablaut distinguishes the three basic inflectable verb stems in Tamasheq:

1. perfective
2. short imperfective
3. long imperfective

Ablaut can change a perfect present stem to a resultative stem. For example, the perfect present stem of the verb 'to run' is òšæl, and its resultative stem is òšál. Note the vowel change from /æ/ to /á/. Ablaut also creates perfective negative stems; for example, the perfect negative stem of əhlæk, the perfect present stem of 'destroy,' is ə̀hlek.

Affixation is also a morphological tool for Tamasheq verbs. One category of verbal affixation is pronominal subject affixes. For example, pronominal subject marking in positive imperatives uses suffixation. The table demonstrates second person subject affixes in imperatives with the example of the verb ə̀jjəš ('enter').

Number	Gender	Suffix	Example
Singular (Sg)	N/A	zero (bare stem)	ə̀jjəš
Plural (Pl)	Masculine (Ma)	-æt	ə̀jjə̏š-æt
Plural (Pl)	Feminine (Fe)	-mæt	ə̀jjə̏š-mæt

Suffixation is responsible for hortative stems. The hortative suffix -et can be added to short imperfective stems. For example:

n-əkrəbbə̏-t-et
1PL.SBJ-taste-AUG-HORT
'Let's taste!'

=== Particles ===
Particles exist in Tamasheq. One type of particle is preposition-like, and these particles precede noun phrases or independent pronouns. For example:

úlli, súnd a-wén-dæɣ
goats, like M-DISTANCE-ANAPH
'Goats, (they are) like that.'

Many categories of discourse-functional particles exist as well. For example, ɣás is an "extremely common" phrase-final particle that means 'only':

i-t̩t̩ás, ɣás
3M.SG.SBJ-sleep.RES, only
'He just sleeps.'

Another example, though less common, is a clause-final particle yá, which emphasizes on the truth of a statement:

ə̀jle-ɣ yɑ́
go.PFV.POS-1SG.SBJ EMPH
'(Yes) I did go!'

=== Clitics ===
In terms of structure, clitics are "normally realized at the end of the first word" in the clause. There are many types of clitics, including directionals, object and dative pronominals, pronominal prepositional phrases, etc. Below, clitics are indicated by the symbol "-\".

==== Directional clitics ====
There are two directional clitics – "centripetal" clitics and "centrifugal" clitics—and they cannot co-occur. The directional clitics are attached to the pronominal clitics hosted by the same word, and are usually accented.

The centripetal clitic's rudimentary form is -\ə̀dd. Its allomorphic variation depends on postvocalic versus postconsonantal position (e.g. -\ə̀d if, -\dd after a, and -\hə̀dd after high V). This clitic can be best understood as 'here,' as it specifies a direction toward "the deictic center." If the verb is non-motion, then the clitic suggests that the action was directed toward 'here' or was carried out in 'this direction'.

osæ-n-\ə́dd
arrive.PFV.POS-3M.PL-\CENTRIPETAL
'They came (here).'

i-su-\hə́dd
3M.SG.SBJ-cough.PFV.POS-\CENTRIPETAL
'He coughed (while coming this way).'

On the other hand, the centrifugal clitic (-\ín) indicates direction away from the deictic center, and is best translated to 'away' or 'there' in English.

wær-\hín mȉl-æɣ
NEG-\CENTRIFUGAL be.on.way.LO.IPFV-1SG.SBJ
'I am not coming (there).'

==== Pronominal clitics ====
===== Object clitics =====
Pronominal object clitics are attached at the end of a simple transitive verb, or a preverbal particle if relevant. Pronominal clitics show wide allomorphic variation mainly depending on point of view and plurality. Allomorphs differ both syntactically and phonologically. The table below shows first person object clitics found in Kal Ansar dialects (T-ka).

person	preverbal	postverbal		
person	after vowel or consonant	after /u/, /i/	after consonant	after /a/
1Sg	-\hi	-\ha-hi	-\a-hi	-\ø-hi
1Pl	-\hə-næɣ	-\ha-næɣ	-\a-næɣ	-\ø-næɣ

As seen in the table, the T-ka first-person singular object clitic attached to a preverbal particle is -\hi. The phrase 'he makes me weep' translates to i-s-álha-\hi, with the clitic attached at the end of the verb 'to make weep' (álha).

The table below shows second and third person object clitics for T-ka dialects. The column designated for post-a variants also occasionally applies for post-i variants.

Person	postverbal after /a/	elsewhere
2MaSg	(i)-\k	-\kæy
2FeSg	(i)-\m	-\kæm
2MaPl	(i)-\wæn	-\kæwæn
2FePl	(i)-\kmæt	-\kæmæt
3FeSg	-\et	-\tæt
3MaPl	-\en	-\tæn
3FePl	-\enæt	-\tænæt

===== Dative clitics =====
Tamasheq also makes use of pronominal dative clitics. The basic dative morpheme is -\ha-, and it gets reduced to -\a\ or -\hə in certain contexts. 1Sg and 1Pl object and dative clitics are identical.

i-wæt-\ȁ-hi-\tt
3M.SG.SBJ-hit.PFV.POS-\DAT-1SG-\3M.SG.OBJ
'he hit it for me.'

This example shows the first-person dative clitic -\a-hi, which follows the verb 'hit' (wæt).

==== Ordering of clitics ====
The basic ordering of clitics is as follows:

1. host word
2. cliticized preposition
3. objective and/or dative
4. directional
5. pronominal prepositional phrase

For example:

ma-\dæɣ-\hà-m-\tæn-\dd e ȉ-ž-ænš ?
what?-\in-\DAT-2F.SG-\3M.PL.OBJ-\CENTRIPETAL FUT 3M.SG.SBJ-CAUS-trade.SH.IPFV ?
'With (lit.:"in") what will he buy them for you?'

== Syntax ==
=== Word order ===
Tamashek's simple main clauses have the word order of VSO: [verb(-\clitics) (subject) (object)...].

ənhæ̀y-æn médd-æn élu
see.PFV.POS-3M.PL.SBJ men-M.PL elephant
‘The men saw the elephant.’

ənhæy-æ̀ɣ hæræt
see.PFV.POS-1SG.SBJ thing
'I saw a thing'

=== Verb phrases ===
As shown in the examples above, the verb precedes the object.

Auxiliaries precede the verb phrase. Future particle has a form àd in clause-initial position. For example:

àd i-jə́l
FUT 3M.SG.SBJ-go.SH.IPFV
'will go away'

The clause-internal negative particle is wæ̀r, though it is heard as [wər] if it is directly before {ə u i}. For example:

wər ə̀ssen-æɣ
NEG know.PFV.NEG-1SG.SBJ
'I don't know.'

=== Noun phrases ===
In Tamashek, a NP starts with the head noun, followed by an adnominal complement such as a demonstrative, a possessor, or a relative clause. Tamashek does not have definiteness marking.

A few chief examples of NP are given below:

==== Demonstrative NP ====
æ-háles w-á
SG-man M-DEM.SG
'this man'

==== Relative clause NP ====
æ-háles mæqqór-æn
SG-man be.big-PTCP.M.SG
'a big man'

==== Possessor NP ====
é-dægg [n æ-háləs]
SG-place [of SG-man]
'the place of the man'

==== Numeral NP ====
Unlike the above three types where the NP starts with the head noun, numerals normally precede the head noun. One exception is when the numeral 'one' functions as an indefinite determiner, rather than as an actual number.

əssín méddən
two.M man.PL
'two men'

=== Adpositional phrases ===
Tamashek has prepositions.

dæ̀ɣ æ-ho
in smoke
'‘in (the) smoke’

jèr-əs dætén burkína
between-3SG and Burkina
'between it (a town) and Burkina (neighboring country)'

=== Interrogatives ===
In Tamashek, question particles precede the clause.

ajə́mm' ə́ttižal ə́n ʕali wæ̀r ø-æwwed̩
yes/no? due.date POSS Ali NEG 3M.SG.SBJ-arrive.PFV.NEG
'Has Ali's due date not arrived?’

mí i-táttæ-n
who? 3M.SG.SBJ-eat.LO.IPFV.POS-PTCP.M.SG
'Who is eating?’

=== Topicalization ===
Topicalization is present in Tamashek, and a topicalized constituent may appear "before the clause proper." For example:

næ̀kk ə̀nta əqqìm-æɣ-\ə́dd
1SG 3SG sit.PFV.POS-2SG.SBJ-\CENTRIPETAL
'As for me, I stayed.’

=== Focalization ===
Focalization is present in Tamashek. The focalized constituted is "fronted to sentence-initial position." The morpheme à, best understood as a minimal demonstrative form, usually follows the focus. For example:

t-a-də̏ɣnu-t-t [à kánn-æɣ]
F-Sg-cream-F-F.SG [FOC make.LO.IPFV-1SG.SBJ]
'It is millet cream[focus] that I am making.’

== Orthography ==
Tamasheq is traditionally written in tifinagh. Latin alphabets have been created in Mali and Niger.

Tamasheq Latin alphabet (Mali)
A a	Ă ă	Ǝ ǝ	B b	C c	D d	Ḍ ḍ	E e	Ɛ ɛ	F f	G g	Ɣ ɣ	H h	Ḥ ḥ	I i	J j	K k	L l	Ḷ ḷ	M m	N n	Ŋ ŋ	O o	Q q	R r	S s	Ṣ ṣ	Š š	T t	Ṭ ṭ	U u	W w	X x	Y y	Z z	Ẓ ẓ	Ž ž	ʼ
a	æ	ǝ	b	tʃ	d	dˤ	e	ʕ	f	g	ɣ	h	ħ	i	dʒ	k	l	lˤ	m	n	ŋ	o	q	r	s	sˤ	ʃ	t	tˤ	u	w	x	j	z	zˤ	ʒ	ʔ
