= Zenaga =

Zenaga may refer to:

- the Zenaga people
- the Zenaga language
