= Berber alphabet =

Berber alphabet may refer to:

- Tifinagh, the ancient Berber alphabet still used by the Tuareg and recently modernized and made official in Morocco
- Berber Latin alphabet, widely used in modern Algerian and some Moroccan publishing, and used by most Berber linguists
- Berber Arabic alphabet, decreasingly used in Moroccan and Libyan Berber publishing
- Shilha Arabic alphabet, traditionally used in the Moroccan Souss
- Tuareg Latin alphabet, official in Mali and Niger
