= Shihhi =

Shihhi may refer to:

- Shihhi Arabic
- Al-Shehhi, sometimes spelled Shihhi
