= Abalak Department =

Abalak Tabalak
- Department
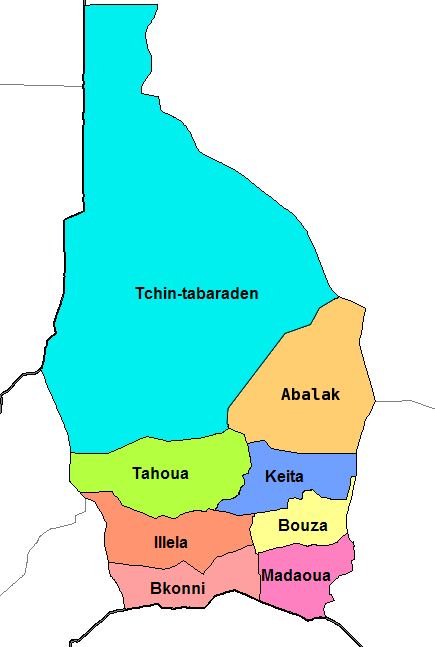
- Abalak Department location in the region
- Coordinates: 15°27′08″N 6°16′42″E
- Country: Niger
- Region: Tahoua Region
- Departmental: Abalak

Area
  - Total: 13,960 km^{2} (5,390 sq mi)

Population (2012 census)
  - Total: 256,301
  - Density: 18.36/km^{2} (47.55/sq mi)
- Time zone: UTC+1 (GMT 1)

Abalak is a department of the Tahoua Region in Niger. Its capital is the city of Abalak. As of 2012, the department had a total population of 256,301 people.

== Communes ==
- Abalak
- Akoubounou
- Azeye
- Tabalak
- Tamaya
