= Marcel Inné =

Nigerien teacher and politician (1934–2001)

Personal details
- Born: 21 November 1934 Dogondoutchi, Niger
- Died: 5 March 2001 (aged 66) Niamey, Niger
- Occupation: Teacher, union leader, politician, radio director, Minister of Education

Marcel Inné (21 November 1934 – 5 March 2001) was a Nigerien teacher, union leader, local politician, radio director, and Minister of Education.

== Union career ==
Marcel Inné attended primary school in Zinder and later received pedagogical training in Niamey. From 1951 to 1954, he worked as an assistant teacher in Maïné-Soroa and Magaria. From 1955, he taught at the regional school of Birni, the historical center of Zinder. In the same year, Inné became the secretary-general of the Zinder section of the National Union of Teachers of Niger (SNEG) and the Zinder section of the National Union of Workers of Niger (UNTN). During the 1950s, he twice visited France for further training.

== Teaching career ==
From 1960 to 1964, Inné was the director of the regional school of Birni. From 1964 to 1967, he served as a school counselor, and from 1968, he was an academy inspector for the Zinder Region. In 1966, he also took on the role of deputy mayor of Zinder. As an academy inspector, he was actively involved in establishing experimental schools. In these experimental primary schools, established in 1973, the national languages of Niger were taught in addition to the official language, French. Marcel Inné and André Salifou also established the theatrical tradition in the city of Zinder.

== Political career ==
A military coup on 15 April 1974 ended the long-term presidency of Hamani Diori. Seyni Kountché became the new leader. Marcel Inné was sent to the capital, Niamey, losing his positions as a union leader, academy inspector, and deputy mayor. In 1974, the military regime appointed him head of educational television. Later, in 1978, Kountché appointed him the first director-general of the public television channel ORTN, a position he held until 1981. From 1981 to 1987, Inné was deputy director of the National Institute of Documentation, Research, and Pedagogical Animation (INDRAP). He also served as a consultant for UNESCO and the CILSS from the 1970s onwards and occasionally oversaw teacher training at the University of Niamey.

After Seyni Kountché's death in 1987, Ali Saibou succeeded him as the head of state. For Marcel Inné, this meant another career leap. From 1987 to 1989, he was a member of the National Development Council, the highest state body, where he was responsible for training regime cadres. On 19 May 1989, Marcel Inné was appointed Minister of National Education, succeeding Ousmane Gazéré. However, he remained in office only a few months. On 20 December 1989, Mamadou Dagra became the new Minister of National Education. Inné retired on 1 January 1990. The head of state, Saibou, subsequently appointed him chairman of the board of the public Gawèye Hotel in Niamey.

== Honors ==
- Knight of the National Order of Niger (1972)
- Knight (1972) and Officer (1990) of the French Academic Palms
- Knight (1976) and Commander (1997) of the Nigerien Academic Palms

== Literature ==
- Jean-Dominique Pénel (2010). Littérature du Niger: Barkiré Alidou, Marcel Inné, Hima Adamou, Djibo Mayaki, Alhassane Danté, Soli Abdourhamane, Amadou Ousmane, Albert Issa, Boubé Zoumé, Idé Adamou. Vol. II. Harmattan. ISBN 978-2-296-12859-0.
