= Direction Nationale de l'Alphabétisation Fonctionnelle et de la Linguistique Appliquée =

Direction nationale de l'alphabétisation fonctionnelle et de la linguistique appliquée (or DNAFLA, English: National Directorate of Functional Literacy and Applied Linguistics) is the national literacy agency in Mali. Among other things, it has established a standard for the Tuareg Latin alphabet.
