= Tuareg languages =

Group of closely related Berber languages and dialects

Tuareg
- Geographic distribution: Sahara and Sahel
- Ethnicity: Tuareg
- Native speakers: 2.9 million (2021–2024)
- Linguistic classification: Afro-Asiatic: Berber; Tuareg
- Subdivisions: Tamahaq; Tamasheq; Air Tamajeq; Tawellemmet

Language codes
- ISO 639-2 / 5: tmh
- ISO 639-3: tmh
- Glottolog: tuar1240
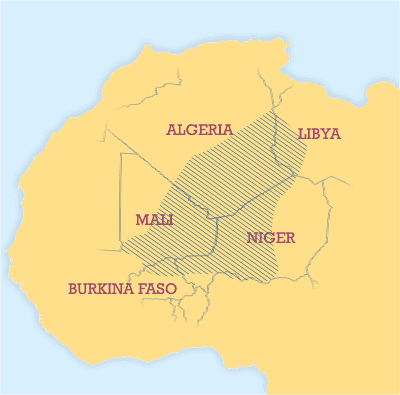

The Tuareg languages (English: /ˈtwɑːrɛɡ/) constitute a group of closely related Berber languages and dialects. They are spoken by the Tuareg Berbers in large parts of Mali, Niger, Algeria, Libya, and Burkina Faso, with smaller communities, such as the Kinnin in Chad, and northern Darfur in Sudan.

== Description ==
The Tuareg varieties, on account of their low internal diversity and high mutual intercomprehensibility, are commonly regarded as a single language by linguists (as for instance by Karl-Gottfried Prasse). They are distinguished mainly by a few sound shifts (notably affecting the pronunciation of original z and h). The Tuareg varieties are unusually conservative in some respects; they retain two short vowels where Northern Berber languages have one or none, and have a much lower proportion of Arabic loanwords than most Berber languages.

The Tuareg languages are traditionally written in the indigenous Tifinagh alphabet. However, the Arabic script is commonly used in some areas (and has been since medieval times), while the Latin script is official in Mali and Niger.

== Subclassification ==
- Tuareg
  - Tamahaq – language of the Kel Ahaggar, and Kel Ajjer spoken in Algeria, western Libya and in the north of Niger by around 77,000 people. Also known as Tahaggart.
  - Tamasheq – language of the Kel Adrar (also known as Adrar des Ifoghas), spoken in Mali by approximately 500,000 people.
  - Air Tamajaq – language of the Kel Ayr (sometimes spelled Aïr), spoken in Niger by approximately 250,000 people.
  - Tawellemet – language of the Iwellemmeden, spoken in Mali and Niger by approximately 800,000 people.

Blench (ms, 2006) lists the following as separate languages, with dialects in parentheses:

- Tawellemet (Abalagh/East, West)
- Tayiṛt (Ingal, Gofat)
- Tamesgrest (Azerori)
- Tafaghist
- Tahaggart/Ahaggar
- Ghat

Speakers of Tin Sert (Tetserret) identify as Tuareg, but the language is Tetserret, a Western Berber language.

== Orthography ==
The Tuareg languages may be written using the ancient Tifinagh (Libyco-Berber) script, the Latin script or the Arabic script. The Malian national literacy program DNAFLA has established a standard for the Latin alphabet, which is used with modifications in Prasse's Lexique and the government literacy program in Burkina, while in Niger a different system was used. There is also some variation in Tifinagh and in the Arabic script.

Early uses of the Tifinagh script have been found on rock art and in various sepulchres. Among these are the 1,500 year old monumental tomb of the Tuareg matriarch Tin Hinan, where vestiges of a Tifinagh inscription have been found on one of its walls.

Tifinagh usage is now restricted mainly to writing magical formulae, writing on palms when silence is required, and in letter-writing. The Arabic script is mostly in use by tribes more involved in Islamic learning, and little is known about its conventions.

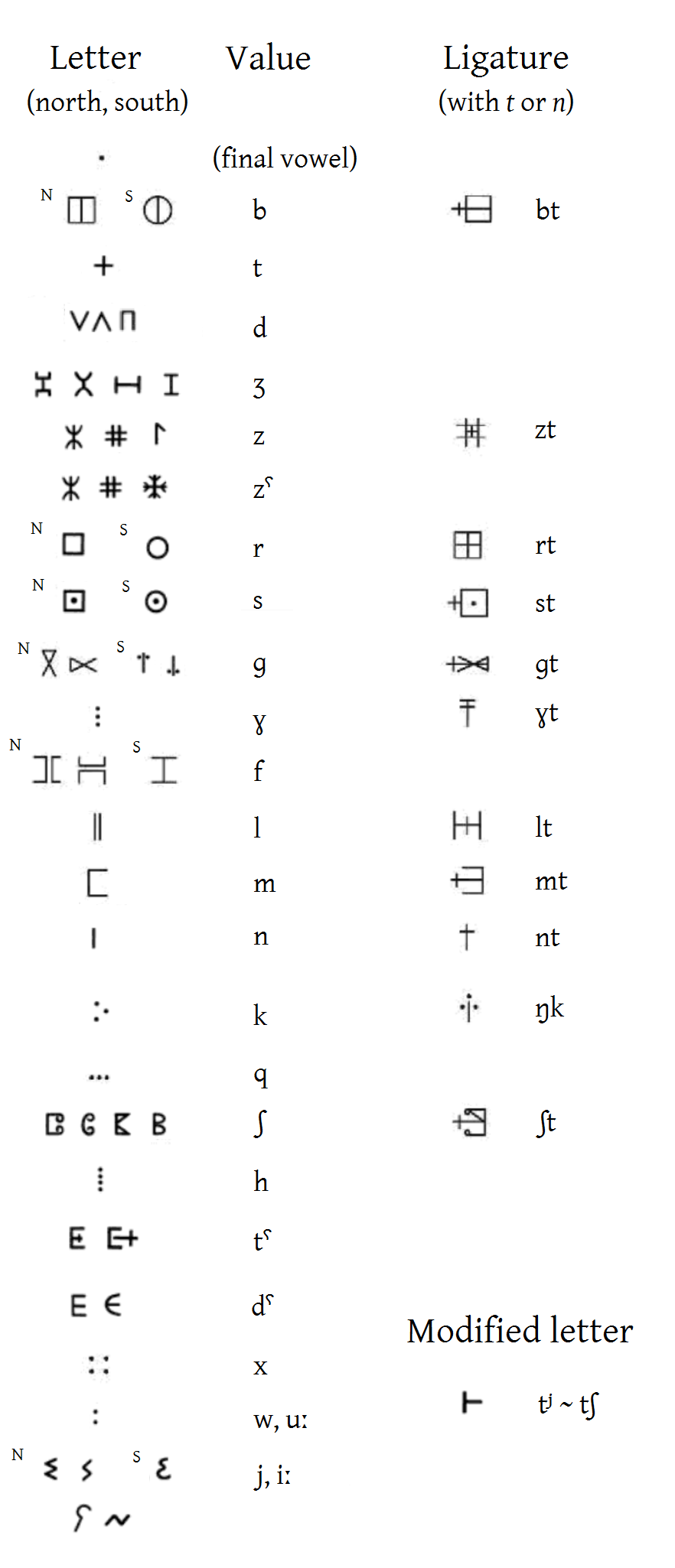
Traditional Tifinagh, including various ligatures of t and n. Gemination is not indicated. Most of the letters have more than one common form. When the letters l and n are adjacent to themselves or to each other, the second one is inclined: ⵍ ("l"), ⵏⵏ ("nn"), ⵍⵏ ("ln"), ⵏⵍ ("nl"), ⵍⵍ ("ll"), ⵏⵏⵏ ("nnn").

Representative alphabets for Tuareg
DNAFLA (Mali)	Niger	Tifinagh		Arabic
DNAFLA (Mali)	Niger	Image	Unicode	Arabic
a	a			
	â			
ă	ă			
ǝ	ǝ			
b	b	ⵀ	ⵀ	ب
(ḅ)				
	c			
d	d	ⴷ	ⴷ	د
ḍ	ḍ	ⴹ	ⴹ	ض
e	e			
	ê			
f	f	ⴼ	ⴼ	ف
g	g	ⴳ	ⴳ	گ ݣ
ɣ	ɣ	ⵗ	ⵗ	غ
h	h	ⵂ	ⵂ	ه
ḥ		ⵆ	ⵆ	ح
(ʕ)		ⵄ	ⵄ	ع
i	i			
	î			
j	j	ⴶ	ⴶ	چ
	ǰ			
k	k	ⴾ	ⴾ	ک
l	l	ⵍ	ⵍ	ل
ḷ	ḷ			
m	m	ⵎ	ⵎ	م
n	n	ⵏ	ⵏ	ن
ŋ	ŋ			
o	o			
	ô			
q	q	ⵆ ⵈ	ⵆ, ⵈ	ق
r	r	ⵔ	ⵔ	ر
s	s	ⵙ	ⵙ	س
ṣ	ṣ	ⵚ	ⵚ	ص
š (ʃ)	š	ⵛ	ⵛ	ش
t	t	ⵜ	ⵜ	ت
ṭ	ṭ	ⵟ	ⵟ	ط
u	u			
	û			
w	w	ⵓ	ⵓ	و
x	x	ⵅ	ⵅ	خ
y	y	ⵢ ⵉ	ⵢ, ⵉ	ي
z	z	ⵌ ⵣ	ⵌ, ⵣ	ز
ẓ	ẓ	ⵥ	ⵥ	ظ
ž (ʒ)	ǧ	ⵊ	ⵊ	ج

The DNAFLA system is a somewhat morphophonemic orthography, not indicating initial vowel shortening, always writing the directional particle as < dd⟩, and not indicating all assimilations (e.g. ⟨Tămašăɣt⟩ for [tămašăq]).

In Burkina Faso the emphatics are denoted by "hooked" letters, as in Fula, e.g. ⟨ɗ ƭ⟩.

== Phonology ==
=== Vowels ===
The vowel system includes five long vowels, /a, e, i, o, u/ and two short vowels, /ə, ă/ (on this page, /ă/ is used to represent IPA [æ]). Some of the vowels have more open "emphatic" allophones that occur immediately before emphatic consonants, subject to dialectal variation. These allophones include [ɛ] for /e/ and /i/ (although /i/ may be less open), [ɔ] for /o/ and /u/ (although /u/ may be less open), and [ă] for /ə/. Karl Prasse argued that /e/ goes back to Proto-Berber, while /o/ is derived from /u/.

Sudlow classes the "semivowels" /w, j/ with the vowels, and notes the following possible diphthongs: /əw/ (> [u]), /ăw/, /aw/, /ew/, /iw/, /ow/, /uw/, /əj/ (> [i]), /ăj/, /aj/, /ej/, /ij/, /oj/, /uj/.

=== Consonants ===
Tamasheq consonants
		Labial	Alveolar		Palatal	Velar	Uvular	Pharyngeal	Glottal
		Labial	plain	emphatic	Palatal	Velar	Uvular	Pharyngeal	Glottal
Nasal		m	n			ŋ (Note: /ŋ/ is rare.)			
Plosive	voiceless		t	tˤ		k	q		(ʔ)
Plosive	voiced	b	d	dˤ	ɟ (Note: Sudlow (2001:26) does not make it clear whether this is a true palatal stop or something else, possibly a front velar stop or some sort of affricate.)	ɡ			
Fricative	voiceless	f	s	(sˤ) (Note: /lˤ, sˤ/ only occur in Arabic loans and /lˤ/ only in the name of Allah.)	ʃ	x (Note: Sudlow (2001:26) does not specify whether these are velar or uvular.)		(ħ) (Note: /ħ, ʕ/ are only used in Arabic words in the Tanəsləmt dialect (most Tamasheq replace them with /x, ɣ/ respectively).)	h
Fricative	voiced		z	zˤ	ʒ (Note: /ʒ/ is rare in Tadɣaq.)	ɣ		(ʕ)	
Lateral			l	(lˤ)					

The consonant inventory largely resembles Arabic: differentiated voicing; uvulars, pharyngeals (traditionally referred to as emphatics) /tˤ/, /lˤ/, /sˤ/, /dˤ/, /zˤ/; requiring the pharynx muscles to contract and influencing the pronunciation of the following vowel, and no voiceless bilabial plosive.

The glottal stop is non-phonemic. It occurs at the beginning of vowel-initial words to fill the place of the initial consonant in the syllable structure (see below), although if the words is preceded by a word ending in a consonant, it makes a liaison instead. Phrase-final /a/ is also followed by a phonetic glottal stop.

Gemination is contrastive. Normally /ɣɣ/ becomes [qː], /ww/ becomes [ɡː], and /dˤdˤ/ becomes [tˤː]. /q/ and /tˤ/ are predominantly geminate. In addition, in Tadɣaq /ɡ/ is usually geminate, but in Tudalt singleton /ɡ/ may occur.

Voicing assimilation occurs, with the first consonant taking the voicing of the second (e.g. /edˤkăr/ > [etˤkăr]).

Cluster reduction turns word/morpheme-final /-ɣt, -ɣk/ into [-qː] and /-kt, -ɟt, -ɡt/ into [-kː] (e.g. /tămaʃăɣt/ > [tămaʃăq] 'Tamasheq' (Note: Note that the geminate is dropped if not followed by a vowel.)).

=== Phonotactics ===
Syllable structure is CV(C)(C), including glottal stops (see above).

=== Suprasegmentals ===
Contrastive stress may occur in the stative aspect of verbs.

=== Dialectal differences ===
Different dialects have slightly different consonant inventories. Some of these differences can be diachronically accounted for. For example, Proto-Berber *h is mostly lost in Ayer Tuareg, while it is maintained in almost every position in Mali Tuareg. The Iwellemmeden and Ahaggar Tuareg dialects are midway between these positions. The Proto-Berber consonant *z comes out differently in different dialects, a development that is to some degree reflected in the dialect names. It is realized as h in Tamahaq (Tahaggart), as š in Tamasheq and as simple z in the Tamajaq dialects Tawallammat and Tayart. In the latter two, *z is realised as ž before palatal vowels, explaining the form Tamajaq. In Tawallammat and especially Tayart, this kind of palatalization actually does not confine itself to z. In these dialects, dentals in general are palatalized before /i/ and /j/. For example, tidət is pronounced [tidʲət] in Tayart.

Other differences can easily be traced back to borrowing. For example, the Arabic pharyngeals ħ and ʻ have been borrowed along with Arabic loanwords by dialects specialized in Islamic (Maraboutic) learning. Other dialects substitute ħ and ʻ respectively with x and ɣ.

== Grammar ==
The basic word order in Tuareg is verb–subject–object. Verbs can be grouped into 19 morphological classes; some of these classes can be defined semantically. Verbs carry information on the subject of the sentence in the form of pronominal marking. No simple adjectives exist in the Tuareg languages; adjectival concepts are expressed using a relative verb form traditionally called 'participle'. The Tuareg languages have very heavily influenced Northern Songhay languages such as Sawaq, whose speakers are culturally Tuareg but speak Songhay; this influence includes points of phonology and sometimes grammar as well as extensive loanwords.

=== Syntax ===
Tamasheq prefers VSO order; however it contains topic–comment structure (like in American Sign Language, Modern Hebrew, Japanese and Russian), allowing the emphasized concept to be placed first, be it the subject or object, the latter giving an effect somewhat like the English passive. Sudlow uses the following examples, all expressing the concept "Men don't cook porridge" (e denotes Sudlow's schwa):

meddăn wăr sekediwăn ăsink	SVO
wăr sekediwăn meddăn ăsink	VSO
ăsinkwăr ti-sekediwăn meddăn	'Porridge, men don't cook it.'
wădde meddăn a isakădawăn ăsink	'It isn't men who cook porridge.'
meddăn a wăren isekediw ăsink	'Men are not those who cook porridge.'

Again like Japanese, the "pronoun/particle 'a' is used with a following relative clause to bring a noun in a phrase to the beginning for emphasis," a structure which can be used to emphasize even objects of prepositions. Sudlow's example (s denotes voiceless palato-alveolar fricative):

essensăɣ enăle	'I bought millet.'
enăle a essensăɣ	'It was millet that I bought.'

The indirect object marker takes the form i/y in Tudalt and e/y in Tadɣaq.

=== Morphology ===
As a root-and-pattern, or templatic language, triliteral roots (three-consonant bases) are the most common in Tamasheq. Niels and Regula Christiansen use the root k-t-b (to write) to demonstrate past completed aspect conjugation:

Tamasheq subject affixes
		singular	plural
1st person		...-ăɣ	n-...
2nd person		t-...-ăd	t-...-ăm
3rd person	M	y-...	t-...-măt
3rd person	F	t-...	...-ăn
Participle form, i.e. "who ..."	M	y-...-ăn	...-năt
Participle form, i.e. "who ..."	F	t-...-ăt	...-nen

Conjugation of k-t-b 'write'
Person		Singular	Plural
1st		ektabaɣ write.1S 'I wrote'	nektab write.1P 'We wrote'
2nd	(m)	tektabad write.2S 'You wrote'	tektabam write.2P/M 'You wrote'
2nd	(f)	tektabad write.2S 'You wrote'	tektabmat write.2P/F 'You wrote'
3rd	(m)	iktab write.3S/M 'He wrote'	ektaban write.3P/M 'They wrote'
3rd	(f)	tektab write.3S/F 'She wrote'	ektabnat write.3P/F 'They wrote'

The verbal correspondence with the use of aspect; Tamasheq uses four, as delineated by Sudlow:

1. Perfective: complete actions
2. Stative: "lasting states as the ongoing results of a completed action."
3. Imperfective: future or possible actions, "often used following a verb expressing emotion, decision or thought," it can be marked with "'ad'" (shortened to "'a-'" with prepositions).
4. Cursive: ongoing actions, often habitual ones.

aspects
Verb	Perfective/simple perfect	Stative/intensive perfect	Imperfective/simple perfect	Cursive/intensive imperfect
z-g-r	izgăr	izgăr		
z-g-r	'He went out'	'He has gone out'		
b-d-d	ibdăd	ibdăd		
b-d-d	'He stood up'	'He stood up (and so he is standing up)'		
	ekkeɣ hebu	ekkêɣ hebu		
	'I went to market'	'I am going to market'		
l-m-d			ad elmedăɣ Tămasăq	lammădăɣ Tămasăq
l-m-d			'I will learn Tamasheq'	'I am learning Tamasheq'
			a-dd-as asekka	
			'He will arrive (here) tomorrow'	
				iwan tattănăt alemmoZ
				'Cows eat straw'
				ăru tasăɣalăɣ siha
				'I used to work over there'

Commands are expressed in the imperative mood, which tends to be a form of the imperfective aspect, unless the action is to be repeated or continued, in which case the cursive aspect is preferred.

== Bibliography ==
- Christiansen, Niels; Christiansen, Regula (2002). "Some verb morphology features of Tadaksahak". SIL Electronic Working Papers. Dallas: SIL International.
- Heath, Jeffrey (2005). A grammar of Tamashek (Tuareg of Mali). Walter de Gruyter. p. 745. ISBN 3-11-018484-2.
- Sudlow, David (2001). The Tamasheq of North-East Burkina Faso. Köln: Rüdiger Köppe Verlag. Archived from the original on 2010-06-07.
