= Abalak =

Abalak ⴰⴱⴰⵍⴰⵗ Abalagh
- Town
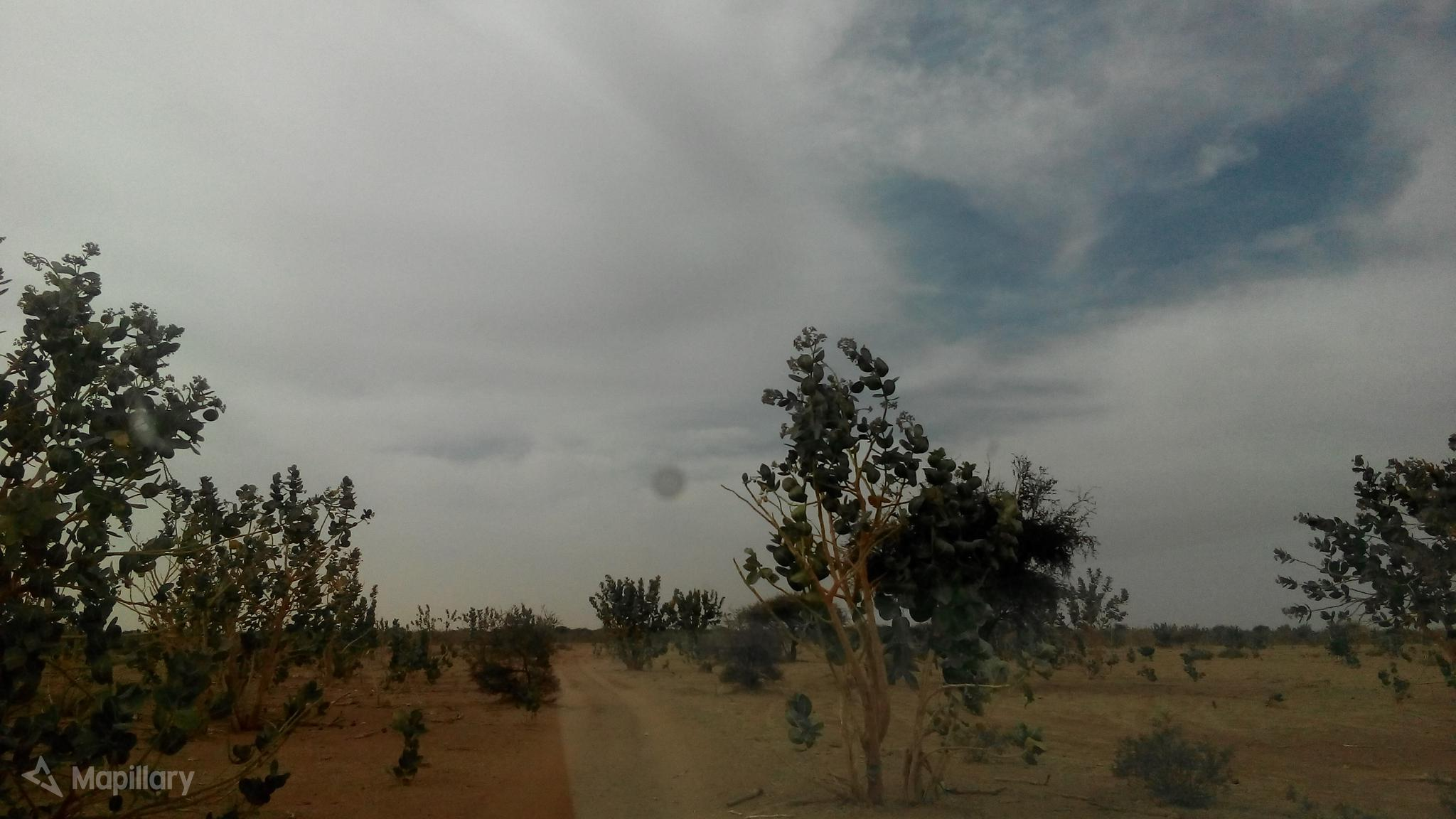

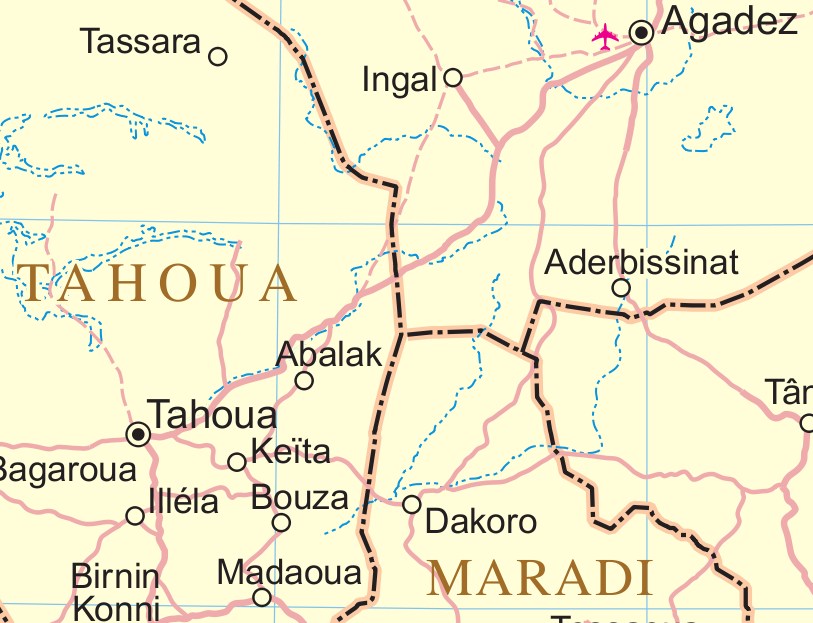
- Abalak and the towns of northwest Niger

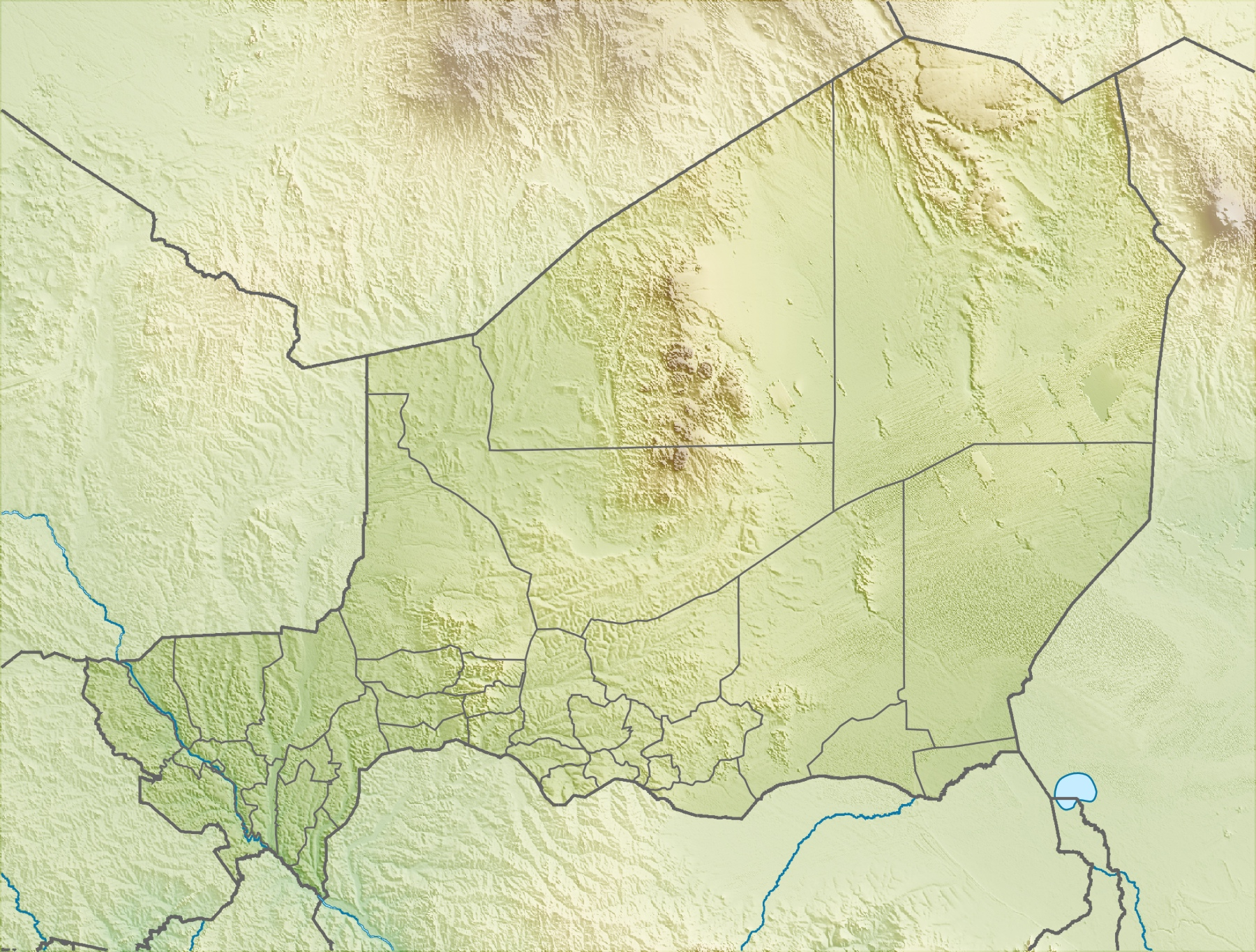
- Location in Niger
- Coordinates: 15°27′51″N 6°17′07″E
- Country: Niger
- Region: Tahoua Region
- Department: Abalak Department
- Commune: Abalak Commune

Government
  - Mayor: Jhelg Millagh

Area
  - Town: 6,877 km^{2} (2,655 sq mi)
- Elevation: 145 m (476 ft)

Population (2012 census)
  - Town: 74,719
  - Density: 10.87/km^{2} (28.14/sq mi)
  - Urban: 21,842
- Time zone: UTC+01:00 (WAT)

Abalak or Abalagh (Tamasheq: ⴰⴱⴰⵍⴰⵗ) is a town located in the Tahoua Region, Abalak Department of northern Niger. It is both a town and Commune: a local administrative division. It is the seat (Chef-lieu) of Abalak Department, one of eight subdivisions of Tahoua Region. The town had a population of less than 74,719 at the 2012 census.

== Geography ==
Abalak lies near the northern extremity of the Sahel, bordering the Sahara. It also lies along the southern edge of the dry plains and fossilized river valleys which make up the Azawagh. The town itself lies in a seasonal wash — a kori (Hausa) or wadi (Arabic) — which retains underground water even during the long dry season.

== Transport and economy ==
Abalak lies along a highway, connected to the main Niamey–Tahoua–Agadez–Arlit paved highway just to the northeast of the town. To the south, the local road connects the town of Keita, Niger to the main road network. Abalak is a regional market town, especially for animals raised by pastoral and seasonally nomadic communities in the area. The town is a center for the "Bororo" Wodaabe–Fula people, and also hosts nomadic Tuareg. The town is unusual in this dry region for its fishing industry, dependent upon an artificial lake created by damming the ancient seasonal river valley near the town.
