= Ait-Awari tribe =

Tuareg tribe

Ait-Awari are a Tuareg tribe probably originating from northern Berber peoples who emigrated southwards centuries ago. Their language, called Tin Sert or Tetserret, may indicate that they came from the gulf of Sirte in Libya.

Today the Ait-Awari community is estimated in a few thousands, they live mainly in the Akabinu (Akoubounou) commune in Niger.
