= Shihhi Arabic =

Arabic variety spoken in Oman and the UAE

- Native to: United Arab Emirates, Oman
- Speakers: 38,000 (2020)
- Language family: Afro-Asiatic: Semitic; Central Semitic; Arabic; Peninsular; Shihhi Arabic

Language codes
- ISO 639-3: ssh
- Glottolog: shih1239
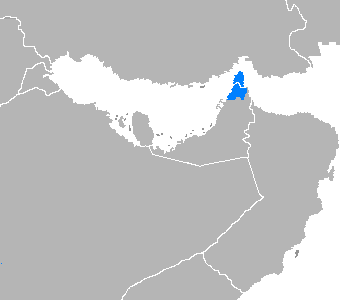

Shihhi Arabic (Arabic: اللهجة الشحية, romanized: Al-Lahjah Al-Shihhiyya, also known as Shehhi, Khasabi, Musandam Arabic, or Ruʾus Al Jibal Arabic) is a dialect of Arabic primarily used in the Musandam Governorate of Oman and the Ras Al Khaimah emirate of the United Arab Emirates. It has been suggested that Shihhi Arabic has two main dialect groups, known as "inland" and "coastal". The Shihuh, Habus, Al Dhuhoori and Al Shemaili tribes have traditionally used the dialect.

== Phonology ==
=== Consonants ===
		Labial	Dental/Alveolar		Retroflex	Palatal	Velar	Uvular	Pharyngeal	Glottal
		Labial	plain	emph.	Retroflex	Palatal	Velar	Uvular	Pharyngeal	Glottal
Nasal		m	n							
Stop/ Affricate	voiceless		t	tˤ		(tʃ)	k	q		ʔ
Stop/ Affricate	voiced	b	d	dˤ		d͡ʒ	(ɡ)			
Fricative	voiceless	f	s	sˤ		ʃ		χ	ħ	h
Fricative	voiced		z					ʁ	(ʕ)	
Tap					ɻ ~ ɽ					
Approximant			l	(wˤ)	ɻ ~ ɽ	j	w			

- Sounds /ɡ, ʕ, tʃ/ are exclusively heard in loan-words.
- /ħ/ may be heard as a voiced glottal [ɦ] when before voiced consonants.
- The retroflex /ɻ/ may have four different allophones; as a flap [ɽ] when in intervocalic positions, as an alveolar [ɹ] when before front vowels, or as an alveolar tap or trill [ɾ, r] when in word-medial position following a consonant.
- In some dialects *ġ has been replaced by a pharyngealized glottal stop [ʔˤ].

=== Vowels ===
	Front	Back
Close	i iː	u uː
Mid	eː	(o) oː
Open	a aː	

- Short sounds /i, u/ when in unstressed positions are heard as a mid-central [ə].

Phoneme/Sound	Allophones	Notes
/i/ [i]	[ɪ]	when in closed syllables
/a/ [æ]	[æ]	as the standard relisation, when in neutral environments or open syllables
/a/ [æ]	[ɐ]	in closed syllables
/a/ [æ]	[a]	when occurring after a pharyngeal or glottal consonant
/a/ [æ]	[ɑ]	when within the vicinity of the velarized or pharyngealized, or uvular consonants
/o/ [o]	[ɔ], [ʊ]	in free variation
/u/ [u]	[ʊ]	in free variation
/u/ [u]	[ɔ]	when preceded by a pharyngeal or velarized consonant
/iː/ [iː]	[ɨː]	when preceded by /q/
/iː/ [iː]	[iːᵊ]	offglide, when followed by a velarized/pharyngealized consonant
/iː/ [iː]	[ᵊiː]	onglide, when preceded by a velarized/pharyngealized consonant
/eː/ [eː]	[ɘː]	when preceded by /q/
/eː/ [eː]	[ɪː]	when preceded by /b/
/eː/ [eː]	[iː]	when preceding or following /j/
/eː/ [eː]	[eːᵊ]	offglide, when followed by a velarized/pharyngealized consonant
/eː/ [eː]	[ᵊeː]	onglide, when preceded by a velarized/pharyngealized consonant
/aː/ [æː]	[æː]	when in neutral environments or open syllables
/aː/ [æː]	[aː]	when after a glottal stop /ʔ/
/aː/ [æː]	[ɑː]	within the position of a velarized/pharyngealized consonant or /ɻ/ consonant
/oː/ [ɔː]	[ɔː]	as the standard realization
/oː/ [ɔː]	[oː]	when preceded be a labial, alveolar, or palatal consonant
/oː/ [ɔː]	[ʊː]	when preceded by /ɻ/
/uː/ [uː]	[ʊː]	in free variation
/uː/ [uː]	[oː]	within the position of a velarized/pharyngealized consonant

== See also ==
- Varieties of Arabic
- Gulf Arabic
