= Semitic romanization =

Representation of Semitic languages in the Latin script

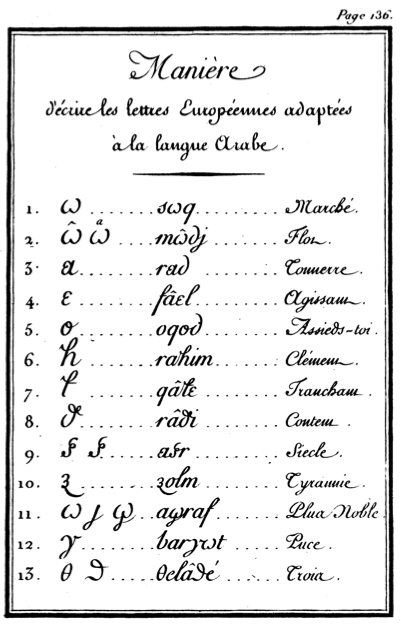
A proposed modified romanization of Arabic from 1795 by Volney

Semitic romanization is the process (generally called romanization) by which Semitic languages are transliterated into the Latin alphabet. The Semitic languages emerged in the Middle East during prehistory. Contemporary Semitic languages are almost all natively written in various abjads or alphabets such as the Arabic, Amharic, and Hebrew scripts. A notable exception is Maltese, which is the only Semitic language with a standard native form written in the Latin script.

== Romanization schemes for specific Semitic languages ==
Romanization schemes for Proto-Semitic and various Semitic languages (Semitic abjads):

- Romanization of Arabic
  - ISO 233
  - DIN 31635
- Romanization of Hebrew
  - ISO 259

== See also ==
- Transliteration of Ancient Egyptian
- Semitic abjad § Descendants of the Semitic abjad
- Cuneiform § Transliteration
- Proto-Sinaitic alphabet

== Sources ==
- Khan, Geoffrey., Watson, Janet C. E., Weninger, Stefan. The Semitic Languages: An International Handbook. Germany: De Gruyter, 2011.
- George, Coulter H.. How Dead Languages Work. United Kingdom: Oxford University Press, 2020 (p. 195-99).
