= Tamahaq language =

Tuareg language spoken in Algeria

Tamahaq
- Native to: Algeria, Libya, Niger
- Region: Sahara
- Ethnicity: Tuaregs
- Native speakers: 130,000 (2020–2022)
- Language family: Afro-Asiatic: Berber; Tuareg; Northern; Tamahaq
- Dialects: Tahaggart (Ahaggar); Ajjer; Ghat
- Writing system: Arabic alphabet Latin alphabet Tifinagh

Language codes
- ISO 639-3: thv
- Glottolog: taha1241
- ELP: Tahaggart Tamahaq
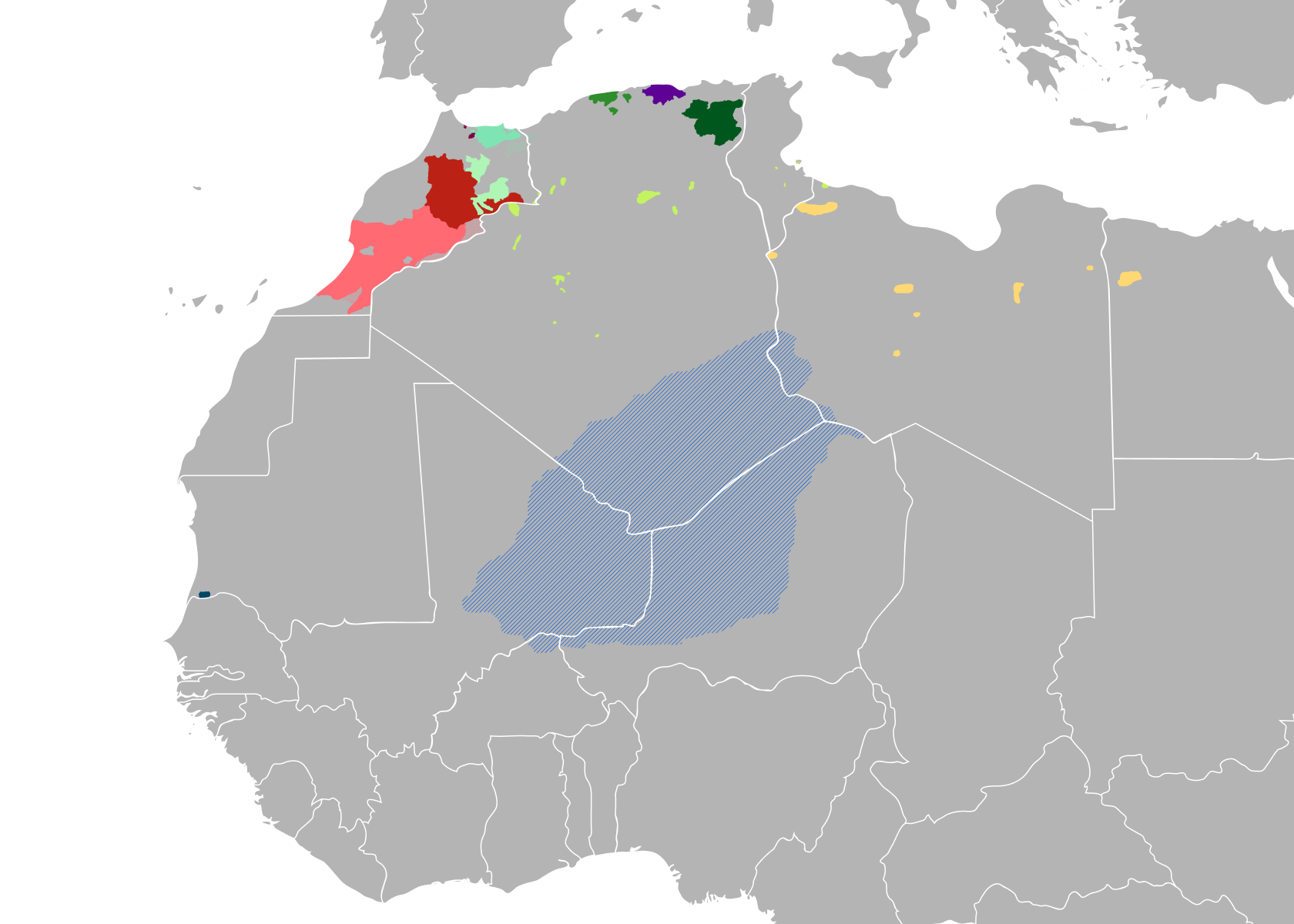
- Tamahaq language

Tamahaq, also known as Tahaggart Tamahaq or Tamahaq Tahaggart, is the only known Northern Tuareg language, spoken in Algeria, western Libya and northern Niger. It varies little from the Southern Tuareg languages of the Aïr Mountains, Azawagh and Adagh. The differences mostly consist of sound changes, such as Tamahaq instead of Tamajaq or Tamasheq. This language is "one of the sister languages spoken by the inhabitants of many districts of the Atlas range of mountains from Egypt to the Western shores of Morocco, and which are all included in the general term Berber."

== Phonology ==
=== Vowels ===
	Front	Central	Back
Close	i		u
Open		a	

=== Consonants ===
		Labial	Alveolar		Palato- alveolar	Velar	Uvular	Glottal
		Labial	plain	pharyngealized	Palato- alveolar	Velar	Uvular	Glottal
Plosive	voiceless		t	tˤ		k	q	
Plosive	voiced	b	d	dˤ	dʒ	g		
Fricative	voiceless	f	s		ʃ		χ	h
Fricative	voiced		z	zˤ	ʒ	ɣ		
Nasal		m	n					
Tap			ɾ					
Approximant		w	l		ʝ			

== Orthography ==
Tamahaq is written in Tifinagh, an abjad of 25 letters. Like other abjads such as Hebrew and Arabic, it is written from right to left.

=== Vowels ===
Tifinagh	IPA equivalent
ⴰ (tegherit)	a
ⵢ/ⵉ (yay)	ʝ, i
ⵓ (yaw)	w, u

=== Consonants ===
Tifinagh	IPA equivalent
ⵀ (yab)	b
ⵜ (yat)	t
ⵋ (yaj)	ʒ
ⴶ (yag)	dʒ
ⵆ (yax)	χ
ⴷ (yad)	d
ⵔ (yar)	ɾ
ⵣ (yaz)	z
ⵟ (yaṭ)	tˤ
ⴾ (yak)	k
ⵍ (yal)	l
ⵎ (yam)	m
ⵏ (yan)	n
ⵌ (yaẓ)	zˤ
ⴹ (yaḍ)	dˤ
ⵗ (yaɣ)	ɣ
ⴼ (yaf)	f
ⵈ (yaq)	q
ⵙ (yas)	s
ⵛ (yaš)	ʃ
ⵂ (yah)	h
ⴳ (yag)	ɡ, ġ

== Grammar ==
=== Nouns ===
Tamahaq nouns belong to two noun classes, traditionally called "masculine" and "feminine", each potentially inflecting for two numbers, singular and plural.

In general, singular masculine nouns begin with a vowel (a, ă, e, i, u, or o), plural masculine nouns begin with the sound i, and feminine singular and plural nouns begin with the sound t.

There are a few exceptions to these rules:

- Certain masculine nouns, plural or singular, begin with a consonant, e.g. ⵢⵜ (ti, 'father').
- Some singular masculine nouns beginning with /u/ keep their initial /u/ in their plural forms, e.g. ⵓ (ul, 'heart').
- If a masculine singular noun begins with a short sound, it may be represented as ă, and this sound can also be kept in the plural, e.g. ⵓ (ălu) and ⵏⵓⵍ (ălwăn).
- A few plural masculine names begin with the sound a, e.g. ⵏⵓⵔ (arăwăn, 'newborn babies').
- Some feminine nouns, plural or singular, don't begin with /t/, e.g. ⴰⵎⵜⵓ (wălătma, 'sister') and ⴰⵎ (ma, 'mother').

Feminine nouns can often be formed from masculine nouns by adding /t/ to the beginning and end.

== Varieties ==
There are three main varieties of Tamahaq:

- Tahaggart (Ahaggar), spoken around the Ahaggar Mountains in southern Algeria by the Kel Ahaggar confederation
- Ajjer, spoken by the Kel Ajjer confederation
- Ghat, spoken around Djanet in southeast Algeria and Ghat in Libya.

Blench (2006) regards Tahaggart and Ghat as distinct Tuareg languages.
