= Tabalak =

Coordinates: 15°06′N 5°40′E

- Commune and village
- Interactive map of Tabalak
- Country: Niger
- Region: Tahoua
- Department: Abalak

Population (2010)
  - Total: 17,475
- Time zone: UTC+1 (WAT)

Tabalak is a village and rural commune in Niger. It is known for Lake Tabalak, a cruicial, life sustaining wetland.
