= Tawellemmet language =

Tuareg Berber language of Mali and Niger

Tawellemmet
- Tawəlləmmət ⵜⵓⵍⵎⵓⵜ تَاوَلَّمَّتْ
- Native to: Mali, Niger
- Region: Sahara
- Ethnicity: Tuareg
- Native speakers: 1.3 million (2021–2022)
- Language family: Afro-Asiatic: Berber; Tuareg; Southern; Tawellemmet
- Writing system: Arabic alphabet Latin; Tifinagh

Language codes
- ISO 639-3: ttq
- Glottolog: tawa1286
- Location of Tawellemmet

Tawellemmet (Tawəlləmmət) is the largest of the Tuareg languages in the Berber branch of the Afroasiatic family. It is usually one of two languages classed within a language called Tamajaq, the other language being Aïr Tamajeq. Tawellemmet is the language of the Iwellemmeden Tuareg. It is spoken in Mali, Niger and parts of northern Nigeria by approximately 1.3 million people with the largest number of speakers in Niger at 829,000 people.

== Phonology ==
=== Vowels ===
	Front	Central	Back
High	i		u
Mid	e	ə	o
Low-mid		ɐ	
Low		a	

- Vowels may also be lengthened as /iː, eː, aː, oː, uː/.
- /a/ in lax form can be heard as [æ].

=== Consonants ===
		Labial	Alveolar		Palato- alveolar	Palatal	Velar	Uvular	Pharyngeal	Glottal
		Labial	plain	phar.	Palato- alveolar	Palatal	Velar	Uvular	Pharyngeal	Glottal
Plosive	voiceless		t	tˤ		c	k	q		ʔ
Plosive	voiced	b	d	dˤ	dʒ	ɡʲ	g			
Fricative	voiceless	f	s	sˤ	ʃ			χ	ħ	h
Fricative	voiced		z	zˤ	ʒ			ʁ		
Nasal		m	n				ŋ			
Lateral			l	lˤ						
Trill			r							
Approximant		w				j				

- Consonants may also occur as geminated.

== Orthography ==
Tawellemmet, as well as other Tuareg languages, has traditionally and recently been written in three orthographies, with one or the other being the dominant orthography in specific contexts. These are Arabic script, Latin script, and Tifinagh (Traditional Tamajeq Tifinagh) script.

Tifinagh has been the ancient and traditional script for writing of Tuareg. However, as Tuareg peoples have been a largely oral society, Tifinagh has only been used primarily for games and puzzles, short graffiti and brief messages.

Arabic alphabet has come to be adopted with the spread of Islam among Tuareg people from the 7th century onward. Tuareg people, being an integral part of the Trans-Saharan trade, played the most significant role in spreading Islam to indigenous African communities further south, in the Sahel and Sub-Saharan Africa. Thus, Tuareg merchant, scholars, and clerics played a significant role in the teaching of the Arabic alphabet and its eventual adoption as part of what's today known as Ajami convention of writing, for writing of languages such as Songhai, Fula, and Hausa.

Latin has been used for writing of Tawellemmet and other Tuareg languages a lot more recently. Latin-derived scripts have been developed and adopted since the 19th century with the arrival of European Christian missionaries, colonial administrators, and linguists.

The Latin script for Tawellemmet is an "Alphabet". Tuareg languages, including Tawellemmet, are the only languages that use Tifinagh in its original traditional form. The Traditional Tifinagh script is an "Abjad", meaning that vowels are not written or shown in any way, neither are geminated consonants. Only in the final position do letters a (ⴰ), w (ⵓ), y (ⵢ) serve as vowels in some contexts. Elsewhere, for example among the Imazighen (Berbers), the modified neo-Tifinagh, which is a full alphabet, is used. The Arabic script is an "Impure Abjad", meaning that some vowels are written using diacritics and some using actual letters, consonant letters serving as vowels depending on the context.

=== Latin ===
Tawellemmet Latin alphabet
A a	Â â	Ă ă	Ǝ ǝ	B b	C c	D d	Ḍ ḍ	E e	Ê ê	F f	G g	Ǧ ǧ	H h
[a]	[aː]	[ɐ]	[ə]	[b]	[c]	[d]	[dˤ]	[e]	[eː]	[f]	[g]	[d͡ʒ]	[h]
I i	Î î	J j	J̌ ǰ	Ɣ ɣ	K k	L l	Ḷ ḷ	M m	N n	Ŋ ŋ	O o	Ô ô	P p
[i]	[iː]	[ʒ]	[ɟ]	[ʁ]	[k]	[l]	[lˤ]	[m]	[n]	[ŋ]	[o]	[oː]	[p]
Q q	R r	S s	Ṣ ṣ	Š š	T t	Ṭ ṭ	U u	Û û	W w	X x	Y y	Z z	Ẓ ẓ
[q]	[r]	[s]	[sˤ]	[ʃ]	[t]	[tˤ]	[u]	[uː]	[w]	[x]	[j]	[z]	[zˤ]

=== Arabic ===
Tawellemmet Arabic (Innislamen) alphabet
Arabic (Latin) [IPA]	ا ‌( - / A a / Â â) [∅]/[a]/[aː]	ب (B b) [b]	پ (P p) [p]	ت (T t) [t]	ث (T t) [t]	ج (J j / Ǧ ǧ) [d͡ʒ]~[ʒ]
Arabic (Latin) [IPA]	ح (H h) [h]	خ (X x) [x]	د (D d) [d]	ذ (Z z) [z]	ر (R r) [r]	ز (Z z) [z]
Arabic (Latin) [IPA]	س (S s) [s]	ش (Š š) [ʃ]	ص (Ṣ ṣ) [sˤ]	ض (Ḍ ḍ) [dˤ]	ط (Ṭ ṭ) [tˤ]	ظ (Ẓ ẓ) [zˤ]
Arabic (Latin) [IPA]	ع ( - ) [ʔ]/[∅]	غ (Ɣ ɣ) [ʁ]	ࢻـ ࢻ (F f) [f]	ࢼـ ࢼ (Q q) [q]	ک (C c / K k) [k]/[c]	ݣ (G g / J̌ ǰ) [g]/[ɟ]
Arabic (Latin) [IPA]	ل (L l / Ḷ ḷ) [l]/[lˤ]	م (M m) [m]	ن (N n) [n]	ه (H h) [h]	و (W w / O o / Ô ô / U u / Û û) [w]/[o]/[oː]/[u]/[uː]	ي (Y y / I i / Î î) [j]/[i]/[iː]
Arabic (Latin) [IPA]	يٰ (E e / Ê ê) [e]/[eː]					

Vowel at beginning of word
A / Â / Ă / Ǝ	E / Ê	I	Î	O / Ô / U / Û
[a]/[aː]/[ɐ]/[ə]	[e]/[eː]	[i]	[iː]	[o]/[oː]/[u]/[uː]
اَ	ايٰـ	اِ	اِيـ	اُو

Vowel at middle or end of word
a / â	ă / ǝ	e / ê	i / î	o / ô / u / û
[a]/[aː]	[ɐ]/[ə]	[e]/[eː]	[i]/[iː]	[o]/[oː]/[u]/[uː]
◌َا / ـَا	◌َ	◌يٰـ / ـيٰـ	◌ِيـ / ـِيـ	◌ُو / ـُو

=== Tifinagh ===
Tawellemmet Tifinagh alphabet
Tifinagh (Latin) [IPA]	ⴰ (A a) [a]/[aː]/[ɐ]	ⴱ (B b) [b]	ⴶ (G g / J̌ ǰ) [g]/[ɟ]	ⴹ (D d / Ḍ ḍ) [d]/[dˤ]	ⴼ (F f / P p) [f]/[p]	ⴾ (K k) [k]
Tifinagh (Latin) [IPA]	ⵂ (H h) [h]	ⵈ (X x) [x]	ⵆ (Q q) [q]	ⵌ (J j / Ǧ ǧ) [ʒ]/[d͡ʒ]	ⵍ (L l / Ḷ ḷ) [l]/[lˤ]	ⵎ (M m) [m]
Tifinagh (Latin) [IPA]	ⵏ (N n) [n]	ⵓ (W w / O o / Ô ô / U u / Û û) [w]/[o]/[oː]/[u]/[uː]	ⵔ (R r) [r]	ⵗ (Ɣ ɣ) [ʁ]	ⵙ (S s / Ṣ ṣ) [s]/[sˤ]	ⵛ (Š š) [ʃ]
Tifinagh (Latin) [IPA]	ⵜ (T t / Ṭ ṭ) [t]/[tˤ]	ⵢ (Y y / I i / Î î) [j]/[i]/[iː]	ⵣ (Z z) [z]	ⵤ (Ẓ ẓ) [zˤ]	⵰ ( . ) separator mark	

== Sample Text ==
Below is a sample text, translation of the Holy Bible, specifically the Gospel of Luke, chapter 1, verses 1 to 4 into Tawellemmet.

English Translation	^{1} Forasmuch as many have taken in hand to set forth in order a declaration of those things which are most surely believed among us, ^{2} Even as they delivered them unto us, which from the beginning were eyewitnesses, and ministers of the word; ^{3} It seemed good to me also, having had perfect understanding of all things from the very first, to write unto thee in order, most excellent Theophilus, ^{4} That thou mightest know the certainty of those things, wherein thou hast been instructed.
Latin Alphabet	^{1} Ya Tayofil wa ǝkneɣ saɣmar, ăytedăn ăggotnen a ǝktăbnen isălan n-awa ɣur-naɣ igan, ^{2} s-ǝmmǝk iman-net was dana-tăn-ǝssoɣălăn aytedăn win tăn ǝggǝyatnen ǝs šittawen-năsăn harwa ɣur ǝnǝtti-năsăn, ǝqqâlăn aytedan ǝšɣâlnen daɣ amel n-awal ǝn-Mǝššina. ^{3} Awen da fǝl di-d-iggăz năk da, dǝffǝr as ǝššiggărăɣ isălan di kul s-ǝlluɣ a d-ibăẓăn ɣur ǝlǝsǝl-năsăn, a dak-in-ăgă y-asăn akătab innizzăman, ^{4} fǝl ad tǝkkǝsăɣ aššak as tǝssunen šin tǝtǝwăsăsăɣra ǝttiddanăt.
Arabic Alphabet	^{١} يا تَايوࢻِيلْ وَا اَکْنيٰغْ سَاغْمَارْ، اَيتيٰدَنْ اَݣُّوتْنيٰنْ اَ اَکْتَبنيٰنْ اِسَلَانْ نَاوَا غُورْنَاغ اِݣَانْ، ^{٢} سَمَّکْ اِيمَانَّتْ وَاسْ دَانَاتَنَسُّوغَلَنْ اَيتيٰدَنْ وِينْ تَنْ اَ ݣَّياتْنَنْ اَسْ شِيتَّاويٰنَّسَنْ هَاروَا غُورْ اَنَتِّينَسَنْ، اَࢼَّالَنْ اَيتيٰدَنْ اَشْغَالنيٰنْ دَاغْ اَميٰل نَاوَالْ اَنمَشِّينَا؞ ^{٣} اَويٰنْ دَا ࢻَلْ دِيدِيݣَّزْ نَک دَا، دَࢻَّرْ اَسْ اَشِّيݣَّرَغْ اِسَلَان دِي کُلْ سَلُّوغ اَ دِيبَظَنْ غُور اَلَسَلْنَسَنْ، اَ دَکِينَݣَ ياسِنْ اَکَتَابْ اِنِّيزَّمَان، ^{٤} ࢻَلْ اَدْ تَکَّسَغْ اَشَّاکْ اَسْ تَسُّونيٰن شِينْ تَتَوَسَسَغْرَا اَتِّيدَّانَت؞
Tifinagh Alphabet	^{1} ⵢⴰ ⵜⵢⴼⵍ ⵓⴰ ⴾⵏⵗ ⵙⵗⵎⵔ ⵰ ⵢⵜⴹⵏ ⴶⵜⵏⵏ ⴰ ⴾⵜⴱⵏⵏ ⵙⵍⵏ ⵏⵓ ⵗⵔⵏⵗ ⴶⵏ⵰ ^{2} ⵙⵎⴾ ⵎⵏⵜ ⵓⵙ ⴹⵏⵜⵏⵙⵗⵍⵏ ⵢⵜⴹⵏ ⵓⵏ ⵜⵏ ⴶⵢⵜⵏⵏ ⵙ ⵛⵜⵓⵏⵙⵏ ⵂⵔⵓⴰ ⵗⵔ ⵏⵜⵏⵙⵏ⵰ ⵆⵍⵏ ⵢⵜⴹⵏ ⵛⵗⵍⵏⵏ ⴹⵗ ⵎⵍ ⵏⵓⵍ ⵏⵎⵛⵏⴰ⵰ ^{3} ⵓⵏ ⴹⴰ ⴼⵍ ⴹⴹⴶⵣ ⵏⴾ ⴹⴰ⵰ ⴹⴼⵔ ⵙ ⵛⴶⵔⵗ ⵙⵍⵏ ⴹⵢ ⴾⵍ ⵙⵍⵗ ⴰ ⴹⴱⵤⵏ ⵗⵔ ⵍⵙⵍⵏⵙⵏ⵰ ⴰ ⴹⴾⵏⴶ ⵢⵙⵏ ⴾⵜⴱ ⵏⵣⵎⵏ⵰ ^{4} ⴼⵍ ⴹ ⵜⴾⵙⵗ ⵛⴾ ⵙ ⵜⵙⵏⵏ ⵛⵏ ⵜⵜⵓⵙⵙⵗⵔⴰ ⵜⴹⵏⵜ⵰

== See also ==
- Languages of Africa
