= Azeye =

Coordinates: 15°40′02″N 6°22′26″E

- Commune and village
- Interactive map of Azeye
- Country: Niger
- Elevation: 1,447 ft (441 m)

Population (2001)
  - Total: 24,129
- Time zone: UTC+1 (WAT)

Azeye is a village and rural commune in Niger.
