= Zenaga language =

Moribund Berber language of Mauritania and Senegal

Zenaga
- Tuẓẓungiyya
- Native to: Mauritania
- Region: Mederdra
- Native speakers: 3,500 (2018–2021)
- Language family: Afro-Asiatic: Berber; Western; Zenaga
- Dialects: Tendgha; Id-ab-lahsen

Language codes
- ISO 639-2: zen
- ISO 639-3: zen
- Glottolog: zena1248
- ELP: Zenaga
- Zenaga in Mauritania is classified as Severely Endangered and Zenaga in Western Sahara is classified as Critically Endangered by the UNESCO Atlas of the World's Languages in Danger.

Zenaga (endonym: Tuẓẓungiyya or āwӓy ən uẓ̄nӓgӓn) is a Berber language spoken in Mauritania and northern Senegal by thousands of people. Zenaga Berber is spoken as a mother tongue from the town of Mederdra in southwestern Mauritania to the Atlantic coast and in northern Senegal. The language is not recognised by the Mauritanian government.

It shares its basic linguistic structure with other Berber languages, but specific features are quite different. In fact, Zenaga is probably the most divergent surviving Berber language, with a significantly different sound system made even more distant by sound changes such as /l/ > /dj/ and /x/ > /k/, as well as a profusion of glottal stops with no correspondents in other Berber varieties that are interpreted as the only segmental survivor of a Proto-Berber *ʔ.

The name Zenaga comes from that of a much larger ancient Berber tribe, the Iznagen, who are known in Arabic as the Sanhaja. Adrian Room's African Placenames gives Zenaga derivations for some place-names in Mauritania.

== Demographics ==
Zenaga is a language descended from the Sanhaja confederation who ruled over much of North Africa during the early Middle Ages. Zenaga was once spoken throughout Mauritania and beyond but fell into decline when its speakers were defeated by the invading Maqil Arabs in the Char Bouba war of the 17th century. After this war, they were forbidden to bear arms and variously became either specialists in Islamic religious scholarship or servants to more powerful tribes. It was among the former, more prestigious group that Zenaga survived longest.

In 1940 (Dubié 1940), Zenaga was spoken by about 13,000 people belonging to four nomadic tribes distributed in an area roughly bounded by Saint-Louis, Podor, Boutilimit and Nouakchott (but including none of these cities):

- Tashumsha ('the five'): 4,653 speakers out of 12,000 members
- D-abu-djhes ('i-D-ab-lahs-en'): 5,000 out of 5,000
- Gumdjedjen ('i-Kumleil-en'), subtribe of the Ida u el Hadj: 700 (out of Ida u el Hadj population of 4,600)
- Tendgha: 2,889 out of 8,500

These tribes, according to Dubié, traditionally specialised in Islamic religious scholarship and led a nomadic lifestyle, specialising in sheep and cows (camel-herding branches of the same tribes had already switched to Arabic). Even then, many speakers were shifting to Hassaniya Arabic, the main Arabic variety spoken in Mauritania, and all were bilingual. Zenaga was used only within the tribe, and it was considered impolite to speak it when non-speakers were present; some speakers deliberately avoided using Zenaga with their children, hoping to give them a head start in Hassaniya. However, many speakers regarded Zenaga as a symbol of their independence and their religious fervour; Dubie cites a Hassaniya proverb: "A Moor who speaks Zenaga is certainly not a Zenagui (that is, a laḥma or a member of a Berber tribe subjugated by the Arab Beni Hassan), nor a warrior".

Half a century later, the number of speakers is reportedly around 2,000. While Zenaga appears to be nearing extinction, Hassaniya Arabic contains a substantial number of Zenaga loanwords (more than 10% of the vocabulary).

== Phonology ==
=== Vowels ===
	Front	Central	Back
High	i iː		u uː
Mid		ə	
Low		a aː	

Phoneme	Allophones
/i/	[i], [ɨ]
/u/	[u], [ʊ], [o], [ɔ]
/a/	[ä], [æ], [ɛ], [œ], [ø], [ɔ], [ɑ]

=== Consonants ===
		Labial	Dental		Alveolar		Post-alv./ Palatal	Post- palatal	Velar	Pharyngeal	Glottal
		Labial	plain	phar.	plain	phar.	Post-alv./ Palatal	Post- palatal	Velar	Pharyngeal	Glottal
Plosive	voiceless				t	(tˤ)	tʲ	c̠	k		ʔ
Plosive	voiced	b			d	dˤ	dʲ	ɟ̠			
Fricative	voiceless	f	θ	θˤ	s	(sˤ)	ʃ		x	(ħ)	h
Fricative	voiced	(v)	ð	ðˤ	z	zˤ	ʒ		ɣ	(ʕ)	
Nasal		m			n		nʲ				
Trill					r	rˤ					
Lateral					l	lˤ					
Approximant		w					j				

Geminated consonants
		Labial	Alveolar		Post- alveolar	Post- palatal	Velar
		Labial	plain	phar.	Post- alveolar	Post- palatal	Velar
Plosive	voiceless		tː		tʲː	c̠ː	kː
Plosive	voiced	bː	dː	dˤː	dʲː	ɟ̠ː	
Fricative	voiceless	fː	sː		ʃː		
Fricative	voiced		zː	zˤː	ʒː		
Nasal		mː	nː		nʲː		
Lateral			lː				
Trill			rː				

- [v] can be heard as an allophone of /f/.
- Sounds [tˤ] and [sˤ] occur marginally.
- Pharyngeal sounds /ħ, ʕ/ are heard from Arabic loanwords.

== Dialects ==
There are significant dialectal differences within Zenaga, notably between the Id-ab-lahsen and Tendgha dialects.
