= Air Tamajeq language =

Tuareg Berber language of Niger

Tamajeq Tayart
- Tayərt ⵜⵢⵔⵜ تَایِیرْتْ
- Native to: Niger
- Region: Sahara
- Ethnicity: Tuareg
- Native speakers: 480,000 (2021)
- Language family: Afro-Asiatic: Berber; Tuareg; Southern; Tamajeq Tayart
- Dialects: Air (Tayiṛt); Tanassfarwat (Tamagarast)
- Writing system: Latin; Tifinagh; Arabic (Innislamen)

Language codes
- ISO 639-3: thz
- Glottolog: taya1257

Air Tamajeq (Tayərt) is a variety of Tuareg. It is spoken by the Tuareg people inhabiting the Aïr Mountains of the Agadez Region in Niger.

Ethnologue lists two dialects: Air (Tayərt) and Tanassfarwat (Tamagarast/Taməsgərəst). Blench (2006) considers these two varieties to be distinct languages. He lists Ingal and Gofat as dialects of Air/Tayərt and Azerori as a dialect of Tamesgrest.

== Phonology ==
=== Vowels ===
Short vowels
	Front	Central	Back
High	i	ɨ ⟨ə⟩	u
Mid	e	ə ⟨ă⟩	o
Low		a	

Phonetic vowel sounds
	Oral			Pharyngealized		
	Front	Central	Back	Front	Central	Back
High	[i]	[ɨ] ~ [ə]	[u]	[ɪˤ]	[ɜˤ]	[ʊˤ]
Mid	[ɪ] ~ [e]	[ɜ] ~ [ɐ]	[ʊ] ~ [o]	[ɛˤ] ~ [æˤ]	[ɐˤ] ~ [aˤ]	[ɔˤ]
Low		[æ] ~ [a]			[aˤ] ~ [ɑˤ]	

=== Consonants ===
		Labial		Alveolar		Palatal (-alveolar)	Velar		Uvular	Glottal
		plain	phar.	plain	phar.	Palatal (-alveolar)	plain	phar.	Uvular	Glottal
Nasal		m	(mˤ)	n	(nˤ)		ŋ			
Plosive	voiceless			t	(tˤ)	(tʃ ⟨č⟩)	k	kˤ	q	
Plosive	voiced	b	bˤ	d	dˤ	(dʒ ⟨ǧ⟩)	g			
Fricative	voiceless	f	(fˤ)	s	(sˤ)	ʃ ⟨š⟩			χ	h
Fricative	voiced			z	zˤ	ʒ ⟨ž⟩			ʁ	
Sonorant	median	w		r	(rˤ)	j ⟨y⟩				
Sonorant	lateral			l	(ɫ)					

- Sounds [tʃ] and [dʒ] mainly occur as allophones of /t/ and /d/ before front vowels. A velar /ŋ/ mainly appears when followed by a labio-velar /w/, or a uvular /q/.

== Orthography ==
Air Tamajeq, as well as other Tuareg languages, has traditionally and recently been written in three orthographies, with one or the other being the dominant orthography in specific contexts. These are Arabic script, Latin script, and Tifinagh (Traditional Tamajeq Tifinagh) script.

Tifinagh has been the ancient and traditional script for writing of Tuareg. However, as Tuareg peoples have been a largely oral society, Tifinagh has only been used primarily for games and puzzles, short graffiti and brief messages.

Arabic alphabet has come to be adopted with the spread of Islam among Tuareg people from the 7th century onward. Tuareg people, being an integral part of the Trans-Saharan trade, played the most significant role in spreading Islam to indigenous African communities further south, in the Sahel and Sub-Saharan Africa. Thus, Tuareg merchant, scholars, and clerics played a significant role in the teaching of the Arabic alphabet and its eventual adoption as part of what's today known as Ajami convention of writing, for writing of languages such as Songhay, Fula, and Hausa.

Latin has been used for writing of Air Tamajeqand other Tuareg languages a lot more recently. Latin-derived scripts have been developed and adopted since the 19th century with the arrival of European Christian missionaries, colonial administrators, and linguists.

The Latin script for Air Tamajeq is an alphabet. Tuareg languages, including Air Tamajeq, are the only languages that use Tifinagh in its original traditional form. The Traditional Tifinagh script is an abjad, meaning that vowels are not written or shown in any way, neither are geminated consonants. Only in the final position do letters a (ⴰ), w (ⵓ), y (ⵢ) serve as vowels in some contexts. Elsewhere, for example among the Imazighen (Berbers), the modified neo-Tifinagh, which is a full alphabet, is used. The Arabic script is an impure abjad, meaning that some vowels are written using diacritics and some using actual letters, consonant letters serving as vowels depending on the context.

=== Latin ===
Air Tamajeq Latin alphabet
A a	Ă ă	B b	Ḅ ḅ	C c	D d	Ḍ ḍ	E e	Ǝ ǝ	F f	F̣ f̣	G g	Ǧ ǧ	Ɣ ɣ
[a]	[ɐ]	[b]	[bˤ]	[t͡ʃ]	[d]	[dˤ]	[e]	[ə]	[f]	[fˤ]	[g]	[d͡ʒ]	[ʁ]
H h	I i	J j	K k	Ḳ ḳ	L l	Ḷ ḷ	M m	Ṃ ṃ	N n	Ṇ ṇ	Ŋ ŋ	O o	P p
[h]	[i]	[ʒ]	[k]	[kˤ]	[l]	[lˤ]	[m]	[mˤ]	[n]	[nˤ]	[ŋ]	[o]	[p]
Q q	R r	Ṛ ṛ	S s	Ṣ ṣ	Š š	T t	Ṭ ṭ	U u	W w	X x	Y y	Z z	Ẓ ẓ
[q]	[r]	[rˤ]	[s]	[sˤ]	[ʃ]	[t]	[tˤ]	[u]	[w]	[x]	[j]	[z]	[zˤ]

=== Arabic ===
Air Tamajeq Arabic (Innislamen) alphabet
Arabic (Latin) [IPA]	ا ‌( - / A a) [∅]/[a]	ب (B b / Ḅ ḅ) [b]/[bˤ]	پ (P p) [p]	ت (T t) [t]	ث (T t) [t]	ج (J j / Ǧ ǧ) [d͡ʒ]~[ʒ]
Arabic (Latin) [IPA]	ح (H h) [h]	خ (Kh kh) [x]	د (D d) [d]	ذ (Z z) [z]	ر (R r / Ṛ ṛ) [r]/[rˤ]	ز (Z z) [z]
Arabic (Latin) [IPA]	س (S s) [s]	ش (Š š) [ʃ]	ص (Ṣ ṣ) [sˤ]	ض (Ḍ ḍ) [dˤ]	ط (Ṭ ṭ) [tˤ]	ظ (Ẓ ẓ) [zˤ]
Arabic (Latin) [IPA]	ع ( - ) [ʔ]/[∅]	غ (Ɣ ɣ) [ʁ]	ࢻـ ࢻ (F f / F̣ f̣) [f]/[fˤ]	ࢼـ ࢼ (Q q) [q]	ک (K k / Ḳ ḳ) [k]/[kˤ]	ݣ (G g) [g]
Arabic (Latin) [IPA]	ل (L l / Ḷ ḷ) [l]/[lˤ]	م (M m / Ṃ ṃ) [m]/[mˤ]	ن (N n / Ṇ ṇ) [n]/[nˤ]	ه (H h) [h]	و (W w / O o / U u) [w]/[o]/[u]	ي (Y y / I i) [j]/[i]
Arabic (Latin) [IPA]	يٰ (E e) [e]					

Vowel at beginning of word
A / Ă / Ǝ	E	I	O / U
[a]/[ɐ]/[ə]	[e]	[i]	[o]/[u]
اَ	ايٰـ	اِ	اُو

Vowel at middle or end of word
a	ă / ǝ	e	i	o / u
[a]	[ɐ]/[ə]	[e]	[i]	[o]/[u]
◌َا / ـَا	◌َ	◌يٰـ / ـيٰـ	◌ِيـ / ـِيـ	◌ُو / ـُو

=== Tifinagh ===
Air Tamajeq Tifinagh alphabet
Tifinagh (Latin) [IPA]	ⴰ (A a) [a]/[ɐ]	ⴱ (B b) [b]/[bˤ]	ⴶ (G g) [g]	ⴹ (D d / Ḍ ḍ) [d]/[dˤ]	ⴼ (F f / F̣ f̣ / P p) [f]/[fˤ] /[p]	ⴾ (K k / Ḳ ḳ) [k]/[kˤ]
Tifinagh (Latin) [IPA]	ⵂ (H h) [h]	ⵈ (X x) [x]	ⵆ (Q q) [q]	ⵌ (J j / Ǧ ǧ) [ʒ]/[d͡ʒ]	ⵍ (L l / Ḷ ḷ) [l]/[lˤ]	ⵎ (M m / Ṃ ṃ) [m]/
Tifinagh (Latin) [IPA]	ⵏ (N n / Ṇ ṇ) [n]/[nˤ]	ⵓ (W w / O o / U u) [w]/[o]/[u]	ⵔ (R r / Ṛ ṛ) [r]/[rˤ]	ⵗ (Ɣ ɣ) [ʁ]	ⵙ (S s / Ṣ ṣ) [s]/[sˤ]	ⵛ (Š š) [ʃ]
Tifinagh (Latin) [IPA]	ⵜ (T t / Ṭ ṭ) [t]/[tˤ]	ⵢ (Y y / I i) [j]/[i]	ⵤ (Z z / Ẓ ẓ) [z]/[zˤ]	⵰ ( . ) separator mark		

== Sample text ==
Below is a sample text, a translation of the Holy Bible, specifically the Gospel of Luke, chapter 1, verses 1 to 4, into Air Tamajeq.

English translation	^{1} Forasmuch as many have taken in hand to set forth in order a declaration of those things which are most surely believed among us, ^{2} Even as they delivered them unto us, which from the beginning were eyewitnesses, and ministers of the word; ^{3} It seemed good to me also, having had perfect understanding of all things from the very first, to write unto thee in order, most excellent Theophilus, ^{4} That thou mightest know the certainty of those things, wherein thou hast been instructed.
Latin alphabet	^{1} Ya ǝmizwǝr-in Tayufil, Ăytedăm ăggôtnen ǝgmâyăn ad ǝktǝbăn ăṛătăn win ǝgănen ɣur-na, ^{2} s-ǝmmǝk was dana-tăn-ăssoɣălăn win tăn ǝnăynen da tizarăt, ǝmmalăn awal ǝn-Mǝššina. ^{3} Adida fǝl-as năk iṃan-in ǝffǝki wa ǝgegh isălan di kul a dd ibăẓăn ɣur ǝlǝṣǝl-năsăn, sǝr-iy a dak ăgăɣ y-asăn akătab izîlalăɣăn, ^{4} fǝl ad tǝssǝṇăɣ as măsṇăt ta tătăwăsăsăɣra tidǝt a tǝṃôs.
Arabic alphabet	^{١} يا اَمِيزْوَرِينْ تَايوࢻِيلْ، اَيْتيٰدَمْ اَݣُّتْنيٰنْ اَݣْمَاينْ اَدْ اَکْتَبَنْ اَرَتَنْ وِينْ اَݣَنيٰنْ غُورنَا، ^{٢} سَمَّکْ وَاسْ دَانَاتَنَسَّوغَلَنْ وِينْ تَنْ اَنَيْنيٰنْ دَا تِيزَارَتْ اَمَّالَنْ اَوَالْ اَنْمَشِّينَا؞ ^{٣}اَدِيدَا ࢻَلَاسْ نَکْ اِمَانِينْ اَࢻَّکِي وَا اَݣيٰغْ اِسَلَانْ دِي کُولْ اَ دّ اِبَظَنْ غُورْ اَلَصَلْنَسَنْ سَرِي اَ دَاکْ اَݣَغْ يَاسَنْ اَکَتَابْ اِزِيلَالَغَنْ، ^{٤} ࢻَلْ اَدْ تَسَّنَغْ اَسْ مَسْنَتْ تَا تَتَوَسَسَغْرَا تِيدَتْ تَمُوسْ؞
Tifinagh alphabet	^{1} ⵢⴰ ⵎⵤⵓⵔⵏ ⵜⵢⴼⵍ⵰ ⵜⴹⵎ ⴶⵜⵏⵏ ⴶⵎⵢⵏ ⴹⴾⵜⴱⵏ ⵔⵜⵏ ⵓⵏⴶⵏⵏ ⵗⵔⵏⴰ⵰ ^{2} ⵙⵎⴾ ⵓⵙ ⴹⵏⵜⵏⵙⵗⵍⵏ ⵓⵏ ⵜⵏ ⵏⵢⵏⵏ ⴹⴰ ⵜⵤⵔⵜ ⵎⵍⵏ ⵓⵍ ⵎⵏⵛⵏⴰ⵰ ^{3} ⴹⴹⴰ ⴼⵍⵙ ⵏⴾ ⵎⵏⵏ ⴼⴾⵢ ⵓⴶⵗ ⵙⵍⵏ ⴹⵢ ⴾⵍ ⴹⴱⵢⵏ ⵗⵔ ⵍⵙⵍⵏⵙⵏ ⵙⵔⵢ ⴹⴾ ⴶⵗ ⵢⵙⵏ ⴾⵜⴱ ⵤⵍⵍⵗⵏ⵰ ^{4} ⴼⵍ ⴹ ⵜⵙⵏⵗ ⵙ ⵎⵙⵏⵜ ⵜ ⵜⵜⵓⵙⵙⵗⵔⴰ ⵜⴹⵜ ⵜⵎⵙ⵰
