= Pharyngealization =

Articulation of consonants or vowels

Pharyngealized

◌ˤ
- IPA number: 423

Encoding
- Entity (decimal): &#740;
- Unicode (hex): U+02E4
- X-SAMPA: _?\
Image

Velarized or pharyngealized

◌̴
- IPA number: 428

Encoding
- Entity (decimal): &#820;
- Unicode (hex): U+0334
Image

Epiglottalized

◌𐞴

Encoding
- Entity (decimal): &#67508;
- Unicode (hex): U+107B4
Image

Pharyngealization or pharyngealisation is a secondary articulation of consonants or vowels by which the pharynx or epiglottis is constricted during the articulation of the sound.

== IPA symbols ==
In the International Phonetic Alphabet, pharyngealization can be indicated by one of two methods:

1. A tilde or swung dash (IPA Number 428) is written through the base letter (typographic overstrike). It is the older and more generic symbol. It indicates velarization, uvularization or pharyngealization, as in [ᵶ], the guttural equivalent of [z].
2. The symbol ⟨ˤ⟩ (IPA Number 423) – a superscript variant of ⟨ʕ⟩, the voiced pharyngeal approximant – is written after the base letter. It indicates specifically a pharyngealized consonant, as in [tˤ], a pharyngealized [t].

Some linguists have also used a superscript voiced epiglottal fricative ⟨𐞴⟩ to represent pharyngealization, though this may also be used more specifically to indicate epiglottalization (a particularly strong degree of pharyngealization), as in the case of strident vowels.

=== Other systems ===
In many romanization systems like for Arabic, ◌̣ is used. For example, ṭ is used for the country of Qaṭar (in Arabic script قطر).

== Computing codes ==
Since Unicode 1.1, there have been two similar superscript characters: IPA ⟨ˤ⟩ (U+02E4 ˤ MODIFIER LETTER SMALL REVERSED GLOTTAL STOP) and Semiticist ⟨ˁ⟩ (U+02C1 ˁ MODIFIER LETTER REVERSED GLOTTAL STOP). U+02E4 is formally a superscript ⟨ʕ⟩ (U+0295 ʕ LATIN LETTER PHARYNGEAL VOICED FRICATIVE, = reversed glottal stop), and in the Unicode charts looks like a simple superscript ⟨ʕ⟩, though in some fonts it looks like a superscript reversed lower-case letter glottal stop ⟨ɂ⟩. U+02C1 is a typographic alternative to ⟨ʿ⟩ (U+02BF ʿ MODIFIER LETTER LEFT HALF RING); which is used to transliterate the Semitic consonant ayin and which is equivalent to a reversed ⟨ʾ⟩, which itself transliterates the glottal Semitic consonants aleph and hamza. In the Unicode charts U+02C1 looks like a reversed ⟨ˀ⟩ (U+02C0 ˀ MODIFIER LETTER GLOTTAL STOP), which is used in the IPA for glottalization. There is no parallel Unicode distinction for modifier glottal stop. The IPA Handbook lists U+02E4 as the Unicode equivalent of IPA Number 423, the dedicated IPA symbol for pharyngealization.

The superimposed tilde is assigned Unicode character U+0334. This was originally intended to combine with other letters to represent pharyngealization. However, that usage is now deprecated (though still functional), and several precomposed letters have been adopted to replace it. These are the labial consonants ⟨ᵱ ᵬ ᵮ ᵯ⟩ and the coronal consonants ⟨ᵵ ᵭ ᵴ ᵶ ᵰ ᵲ ᵳ ɫ⟩.

Character	ʕ		ˤ		ˁ		ʿ		̴	
Unicode name	Latin letter pharyngeal voiced fricative	Latin letter pharyngeal voiced fricative	modifier letter small reversed glottal stop	modifier letter small reversed glottal stop	modifier letter reversed glottal stop	modifier letter reversed glottal stop	modifier letter left half ring	modifier letter left half ring	combining tilde overlay	combining tilde overlay
Character encoding	decimal	hex	decimal	hex	decimal	hex	decimal	hex	decimal	hex
Character encoding	661	0295	740	02E4	705	02C1	703	02BF	820	0334
Numeric character reference	&#661;	&#x0295;	&#740;	&#x02E4;	&#705;	&#x02C1;	&#703;	&#x02BF;	&#820;	&#x0334;

== Usage ==
Ubykh, an extinct Northwest Caucasian language spoken in Russia and Turkey, used pharyngealization in 14 pharyngealized consonants. Tsilhqotʼin has pharyngealized consonants that trigger pharyngealization of vowels. Many languages (such as Salishan, Sahaptian) in the Plateau culture area of North America also have pharyngealization processes that are triggered by pharyngeal or pharyngealized consonants, which affect vowels.

The Tuu/"Khoisan" language Taa (or !Xóõ) has pharyngealized vowels that contrast phonemically with voiced, breathy and epiglottalized vowels. That feature is represented in the orthography by a tilde under the respective pharyngealized vowel. In Tuu languages, epiglottalized vowels are phonemic.

For many languages, pharyngealization is generally associated with more dental articulations of coronal consonants. Dark l tends to be dental or denti-alveolar, but clear l tends to be retracted to an alveolar position.

Arabic and Syriac use secondary uvularization, which is generally not distinguished from pharyngealization, for the "emphatic" coronal consonants.

=== Examples of pharyngealized consonants ===
(Uvularized consonants are not distinguished from pharyngealized.)

Attested pharyngealized consonants (pulmonic only)
	Labial		Dental		Alveolar		Postalveolar		Velar		Uvular		Glottal
Nasal		mˤ				nˤ						ɴˤ	
Plosive	pˤ	bˤ			tˤ	dˤ			kˤ	ɡˤ	qˤ	ɢˤ	ʔˤ
Sibilant affricate					tsˤ	dzˤ	tʃˤ	dʒˤ					
Fricative	fˤ	vˤ	θˤ	ðˤ	sˤ	zˤ	ʃˤ	ʒˤ			χˤ	ʁˤ	hˤ
Approximant						ɹˤ				wˤ			
Trill						rˤ							
Lateral affricate					tɬˤ	dɮˤ							
Lateral fricative					ɬˤ	ɮˤ							
Lateral approximant						lˤ							

==== Stops ====
- pharyngealized voiceless alveolar stop [tˤ] (in Chechen, Berber, Arabic, Kurmanji, Mizrahi and Biblical Hebrew)
- pharyngealized voiced alveolar stop [dˤ] (in Chechen, Tamazight and Arabic)
- pharyngealized voiceless bilabial stop [pˤ] (in Kurmanji, Chechen and Ubykh)
- pharyngealized voiced bilabial stop [bˤ] (in Chechen, Ubykh, Siwa, Shihhi Arabic and Iraqi Arabic, allophonic in Adyghe and Kabardian)
- pharyngealized voiceless uvular stop [qˤ] (in Ubykh, Tsakhur, and Archi)
- pharyngealized voiced uvular stop [ɢˤ] (in Tsakhur)
- pharyngealized glottal stop [ʔˤ] (in Shihhi Arabic; allophonic in Chechen)
- pharyngealized voiceless velar plosive [kˤ] (in Kurmanji)
- pharyngealized voiced velar plosive [ɡˤ] (in Sorani)

==== Fricatives ====
- pharyngealized voiceless alveolar sibilant [sˤ] (in Chechen, Kurmanji, Arabic, Biblical Hebrew and Northern Berber)
- pharyngealized voiced alveolar sibilant [zˤ] (in Chechen, Berber, Arabic and Kurmanji)
- pharyngealized voiceless postalveolar fricative [ʃˤ] (in Kabyle and Chechen)
- pharyngealized voiced postalveolar fricative [ʒˤ] (in Kabyle and Chechen)
- pharyngealized voiceless dental fricative [θˤ] (in Zenaga, Shawiya and Shehri)
- pharyngealized voiced dental fricative [ðˤ] (in Arabic ظ, and as [θ̬ˤ], a variant pronunciation in Mehri)
- pharyngealized voiceless alveolar lateral fricative [ɬˤ]
- pharyngealized voiced alveolar lateral fricative [ɮˤ] (in Soqotri, a variant pronunciation in Mehri, and postulated for Classical Arabic)
- pharyngealized voiceless labiodental fricative [fˤ] (in Sorani)
- pharyngealized voiced labiodental fricative [vˤ] (in Ubykh)
- pharyngealized voiceless uvular fricative [χˤ] (in Ubykh, Tsakhur, Archi and Bzyb Abkhaz)
- pharyngealized voiced uvular fricative [ʁˤ] (in Ubykh, Tsakhur and Archi)
- pharyngealized voiceless glottal fricative [hˤ] (in Tsakhur)

==== Affricates ====
- pharyngealized voiceless alveolar affricate [tsˤ] (in Chechen)
- pharyngealized voiced alveolar affricate [dzˤ] (in Chechen)
- pharyngealized voiceless postalveolar affricate [tʃˤ] (in Chechen and Kurmanji)
- pharyngealized voiced postalveolar affricate [dʒˤ] (in Chechen)

==== Trills ====
- pharyngealized voiced alveolar trill [rˁ] (in Kabyle, Chechen and Siwa)

==== Nasals ====
- pharyngealized bilabial nasal [mˤ] (in Chechen, Ubykh, Moroccan Darija, and Iraqi Arabic)
- pharyngealized alveolar nasal [nˤ] (in Chechen)
- pharyngealized uvular nasal [ɴˤ] (in Kusunda)

==== Approximants ====
- pharyngealized labialized velar approximant [wˤ] (in Shihhi Arabic, Chechen and Ubykh)
- pharyngealized alveolar lateral approximant [lˤ] (in Kabyle, Chechen, English, and Northern Standard Dutch)
- pharyngealized labialized postalveolar approximant [ɹ̠ˤʷ] (an /r/ variant in American English)
- pharyngealized velar approximant [ɹ̈ˤ], with the body of the tongue bunched up at the velum (in some dialects of American English and Dutch)

=== Examples of pharyngealized vowels ===
- pharyngealized vowels [ʊˤː oˤ oˤː ʌˤː ɔˤː aˤː] in Chemnitz German
- pharyngealized vowels [ɪˤ ɜˤ ʊˤ ɛˤ ~ æˤ ɐˤ ~ aˤ ɔˤ aˤ ~ ɑˤ] in the Air Tamajeq language
- pharyngealized vowels [iˤ uˤ oˤ ɑˤ] in Even
- pharyngealized vowels [iˤ uˤ eˤ əˤ oˤ aˤ] in Tsakhur
- pharyngealized vowels [iˤ uˤ ɛˤ ɔˤ ɑˤ] in Udi
- pharyngealized vowels [ĩˤ ũˤ ãˤ eˤ oˤ aˤ] in Mambay (Mangbai)
- pharyngealized vowels [iˤ uˤ eˤ oˤ aˤ] in ǃXóõ
