= African Archery Championships =

- Status: Active
- Genre: African Championship
- Date: Varying
- Frequency: Biannual
- Country: Varying
- Inaugurated: 1995
- Previous event: 2025 African Archery Championships
- Next event: 2026 African Archery Championships
- Organiser: World Archery Africa

The African Archery Championship (French: Championnats d'Afrique de tir à l'arc) is the Archery Top African tournament held every two years, Ruled and managed by The World Archery Africa.

== Summary of championships ==
Below the list of the summary championships

Host cities of the African Archery Championships
1999 in multiple cities

Eds.	Year	Host City	Host Country	Date	Venue	No. of Nations	No. of Athletes	Top Country
1	1995	Harare	Zimbabwe	26–30 September 1995				
2	1996	Malindi	Kenya					
3	1999	Multiple cities	South Africa					
4	2000	Port Elizabeth	South Africa					
5	2003	Nairobi	Kenya	29–30 November 2003	Splash Shooting Ground	8	30	Egypt
6	2004	Vacoas-Phoenix	Mauritius	28–30 May 2004	Gymkhana			Mauritius
7	2008	Cairo	Egypt	7–12 February 2008	Degla Sports Centre			Morocco / South Africa
8	2010	Ain Sokhna; Pretoria	Egypt; South Africa	7–11 March 2010; 24–27 April 2010		14; 4	57; 92	Egypt; South Africa
9	2012	Rabat	Morocco	11–16 March 2012		14	81	Egypt
10	2014	Luxor	Egypt	10–13 October 2014		15	73	Egypt
11	2016	Windhoek	Namibia	28–31 January 2016		14	81	Egypt
12	2022	Pretoria	South Africa	5–10 November 2022		16	65	South Africa
13	2023	Nabeul	Tunisia	7–12 November 2023		20	92	Egypt
14	2025	Abidjan	Ivory Coast	19–23 November 2025	Parc des Sports de Treichville	16	105	Ivory Coast
15	2026	Oran	Algeria	20–26 July 2026	Mediterranean Village	17	127	Algeria

== Editions ==
=== Recurve ===
	Year	Host	Men's individual	Women's individual	Men's team	Women's team	Mixed team
1	1995	Harare, Zimbabwe					
2	1996	Malindi, Kenya	(Kenya) Dominic Rebelo				
3	1999	Multiple cities, South Africa					
4	2000	Port Elizabeth, South Africa					
5	2003	Nairobi, Kenya	(Egypt) Maged Mohy	(South Africa) Kirsten Lewis			
6	2004	Vacoas-Phoenix, Mauritius	(South Africa) Glenn Coward	(Mauritius) Sabila Edoo			
7	2008	Cairo, Egypt	(South Africa) Calvin Hartley	(Morocco) Fatine Ouadoudi			
8	2010	Ain Sokhna, Egypt	(Libya) Ali Arebi	(Egypt) Nada Kamel	Egypt	Egypt	
8	2010	Pretoria, South Africa	(South Africa) William Frank	(South Africa) Karen Hultzer			
9	2012	Rabat, Morocco	(Ivory Coast) Philippe Kouassi (closed)	(Egypt) Nada Kamel (closed)	Egypt	Poland	Egypt
9	2012	Rabat, Morocco	(Egypt) Hady Elkholosy (open)	(Poland) Justyna Mospinek (open)	Egypt	Poland	Egypt
10	2014	Luxor, Egypt	(Zimbabwe) Gavin Sutherland	(Egypt) Hania Fouda	Egypt		Egypt
11	2016	Windhoek, Namibia	(Egypt) Ahmed El-Nemr	(Kenya) Shehzana Anwar	South Africa	Egypt	Ivory Coast
12	2022	Pretoria, South Africa	(South Africa) Wian Roux	(Ivory Coast) Ekpobi Yedagne	South Africa	Ivory Coast	Ivory Coast
12	2022	Pretoria, South Africa	(South Africa) Adrian Miller (open)	(Ivory Coast) Ekpobi Yedagne	South Africa	Ivory Coast	Ivory Coast
13	2023	Nabeul, Tunisia	(Egypt) Youssef Tolba	(Egypt) Jana Ali	Egypt	Egypt	Chad
14	2025	Abidjan, Ivory Coast	(Ivory Coast) Franck Eyeni	(Ivory Coast) Ekpobi Yedagne	Mauritius	Ivory Coast	Algeria
15	2026	Oran, Algeria	(Algeria) Imadeddine Bakri	(Tunisia) Roua Ben Abdelkader	Algeria	Algeria	Tunisia

In italic: non african invited.

=== Compound ===
	Year	Host	Men's individual	Women's individual	Men's team	Women's team	Mixed team
8	2010	Ain Sokhna, Egypt	(South Africa) Riaan Crowther	(South Africa) Jorina Coetzee	Namibia		
8	2010	Pretoria, South Africa	(South Africa) Wesley Gates	(South Africa) Ida Mostert			
9	2012	Rabat, Morocco		(Namibia) Iroleen van Litzenborgh (closed)	Namibia		
9	2012	Rabat, Morocco	(South Africa) Petrus Marx (open)	(Namibia) Beanta Viviers (open)	Namibia		
10	2014	Luxor, Egypt	(Egypt) Ahmed Fakhry	(Egypt) Hala Elgibily		Namibia	
11	2016	Windhoek, Namibia	(Namibia) Francois Marais	(Egypt) Hala Elgibily	South Africa	Egypt	South Africa
12	2022	Pretoria, South Africa	(South Africa) Christian Beyers de Klerk	(South Africa) Jeanine Van Kradenburg	South Africa		South Africa
12	2022	Pretoria, South Africa	(South Africa) Philip Coates-Palgrave (open)	(Namibia) Katelynn Venter (open)	South Africa		South Africa
13	2023	Nabeul, Tunisia	(Mauritius) Henri How Kemg Fat	(Namibia) Jacqueline Coetzee	Mauritius		Zimbabwe
13	2023	Nabeul, Tunisia	(Senegal) Aliou Dramé (open)	(Namibia) Jacqueline Coetzee	Mauritius		Zimbabwe
14	2025	Abidjan, Ivory Coast	(Mauritius) Adrien Charoux	(Egypt) Nora Elsabagh	Mauritius		
14	2025	Abidjan, Ivory Coast	(Senegal) Aliou Dramé (open)	(Egypt) Nora Elsabagh	Mauritius		
15	2026	Oran, Algeria	(Mauritius) Jannie Meeuwesen	(Namibia) Jacqueline Coetzee	Mauritius		Namibia

=== Barebow ===
	Year	Host	Men's individual	Women's individual	Men's team	Women's team	Mixed team
12	2022	Pretoria, South Africa	(South Africa) Brummer Henk				
13	2023	Nabeul, Tunisia	(Namibia) Lutz Wahlers				
14	2025	Abidjan, Ivory Coast	(South Africa) Johannes Hugo Rossouw	(Kenya) Gloria Kitali			Ivory Coast
15	2026	Oran, Algeria	(Cameroon) Junior Aristide Falang Delli	(Algeria) Marwa Rahmoun	Algeria	Nigeria	Algeria

== Other competitions ==
=== Juniors (U-20 / U-21) ===
	Year	Host	Men's individual	Women's individual	Men's team	Women's team	Mixed team
Juniors recurve
8	2010	Ain Sokhna, Egypt	(Egypt) Mohamed Osman Kamel	(Egypt) Aya Mamdouh			
8	2010	Pretoria, South Africa					
9	2012	Rabat, Morocco	(Egypt) Ali Ebdelbar (closed)	(Egypt) Reem Mansour (closed)	Namibia		
9	2012	Rabat, Morocco	(Iraq) Mhamdad Mahmoud (open)	(Egypt) Reem Mansour (open)	Namibia		
10	2014	Luxor, Egypt	(Egypt) Ahmed Shamseldin	(Egypt) Reem Hemida	Algeria	Egypt	Egypt
11	2016	Windhoek, Namibia					
12	2022	Pretoria, South Africa					
13	2023	Nabeul, Tunisia					
14	2025	Abidjan, Ivory Coast					
15	2026	Oran, Algeria	(Algeria) Iliyas Bouzouar	(Algeria) Maria Drid	Libya		
Juniors compound
10	2014	Luxor, Egypt				Namibia	
11	2016	Windhoek, Namibia					
12	2022	Pretoria, South Africa					
13	2023	Nabeul, Tunisia					
14	2025	Abidjan, Ivory Coast					
15	2026	Oran, Algeria					

In italic: non african invited.

=== Cadets (U-17 / U-18) ===
	Year	Host	Men's individual	Women's individual	Men's team	Women's team	Mixed team
Cadets recurve
9	2012	Rabat, Morocco	(Egypt) Ahmed El Kady (closed)	(Benin) Kpetchehoué Zinsou (closed)			
9	2012	Rabat, Morocco	(Egypt) Ahmed El Kady (open)	(Egypt) Nouha El Wakil (open)			
10	2014	(Namibia) Luxor, Egypt	No competition for Cadets, it was held the same year in Windhoek.				
–	2014	Windhoek, Namibia	(Libya) Ali El Ghrari	(Egypt) Hana El Shimy			
11	2016	Windhoek, Namibia					
12	2022	Pretoria, South Africa					
13	2023	Nabeul, Tunisia					
14	2025	Abidjan, Ivory Coast	(Ivory Coast) Kouassi Chadrac Yao	(Egypt) Nouray Abdelrahman	Ivory Coast	Guinea	Egypt
15	2026	Oran, Algeria	(Egypt) Ismail Ezzeldin	(Egypt) Nouray Abdelrahman		Algeria	Egypt

=== Para Archery ===
	Year	Host	Men's individual	Women's individual	Men's team	Women's team	Mixed team
Para recurve
12	2022	Pretoria, South Africa	(South Africa) Adrian Miller				
13	2023	Nabeul, Tunisia					
14	2025	Abidjan, Ivory Coast					
15	2026	Oran, Algeria	(Uganda) Precious Allan Asiimwe				
Para compound
12	2022	Pretoria, South Africa	(South Africa) Philip Coates-Palgrave	(Namibia) Katelynn Venter			
13	2023	Nabeul, Tunisia					
14	2025	Abidjan, Ivory Coast					
15	2026	Oran, Algeria	(Senegal) Aliou Dramé	(Namibia) Saimi Naango Shilunga			
Para W1
12	2022	Pretoria, South Africa	(South Africa) Shaun Anderson				
13	2023	Nabeul, Tunisia					
14	2025	Abidjan, Ivory Coast					
15	2026	Oran, Algeria					
