= Atiq Mosque (Siwa) =

Mosque in the Siwa Oasis, Egypt

- المسجد العتيق
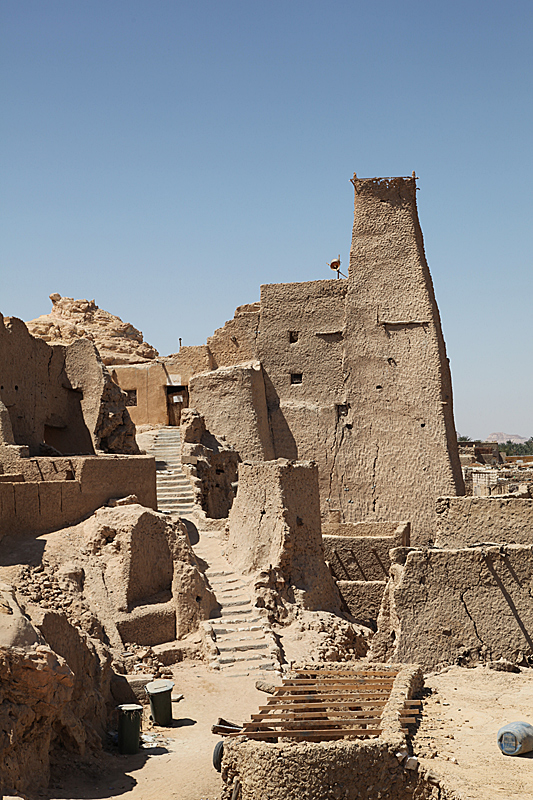

Religion
- Affiliation: Islam
- Ecclesiastical or organisational status: Mosque and mausoleum
- Status: Active

Location
- Location: Shali, Siwa Oasis
- Country: Egypt
- Interactive map of Atiq Mosque
- Coordinates: 29°12′05″N 25°31′08″E

Architecture
- Type: Mosque
- Completed: 1106-1107

The Atiq Mosque (Arabic: المسجد العتيق, lit. 'old mosque') also known as the Sidi Suleiman Mosque, is a historical landmark and the oldest mosque in the Siwa oasis, Egypt. It is located atop the Shali Fortress in the city of Shali, which means city in the Siwi language. It is the oldest mosque in Africa built with mud.

== History ==
Its construction dates between 1106 to 1107 and represents a significant part of Siwa's ancient history. The mosque is distinguished by its traditional Siwan architectural style, having been built using local building materials such as kershif, a mixture of clay and salt, which was a common building material at the time. The mosque underwent refurbishing in 2011, as well as a major restoration project in 2015.

== Description ==
The mosque covers an area of approximately 100 square meters and has two entrances: the main entrance on the northeast side and another entrance on the southwest side. Six massive, barrel-shaped pillars divide the mosque into three aisles parallel to the qibla wall. The mosque's roof is made of palm trunks. The mihrab is simple, indicating the qibla using it's semi-circular niche design. It is devoid of any calligraphy or decorations. It is also covered with a layer of white plaster, and there is no projection in the qibla wall from the outside. The mosque has a rectangular layout.

The mosque is distinguished by its massive minaret, located in the northeast corner, resembling the style of minarets in Morocco and Andalusia. Its unique shape features a base with a cubic shaft that tapers as one ascends. The minaret is situated at the northeast end. The pulpit is constructed of stone covered using a coat of plaster in a simple design. It consists of three steps parallel to the qibla wall, ensuring that the rows of worshippers are not interrupted, similar to the Prophet's pulpit in Medina. The mosque's windows are created from olive tree trunks.

== Gallery ==
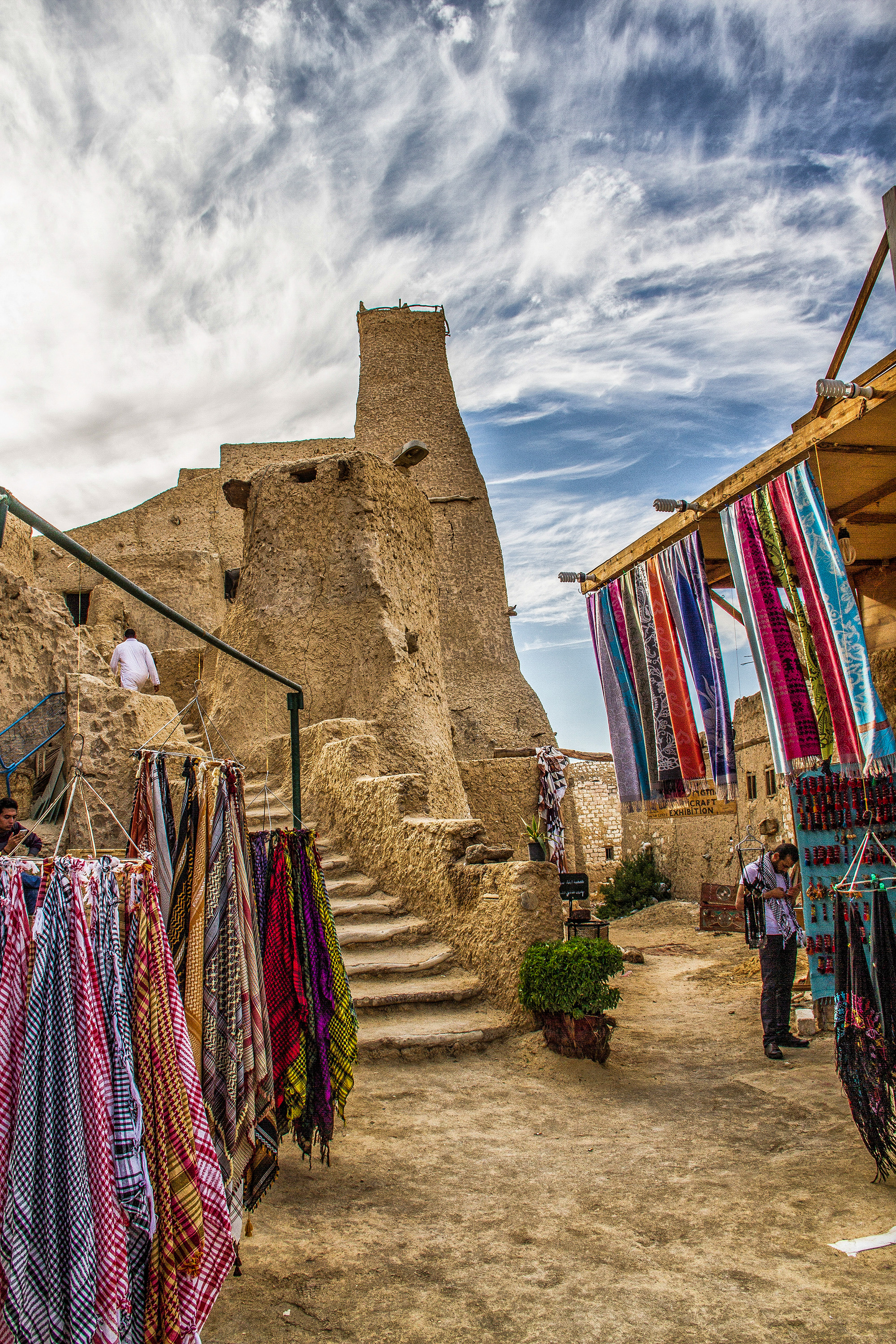
Picture of the mosque's entrance steps taken from a nearby old market

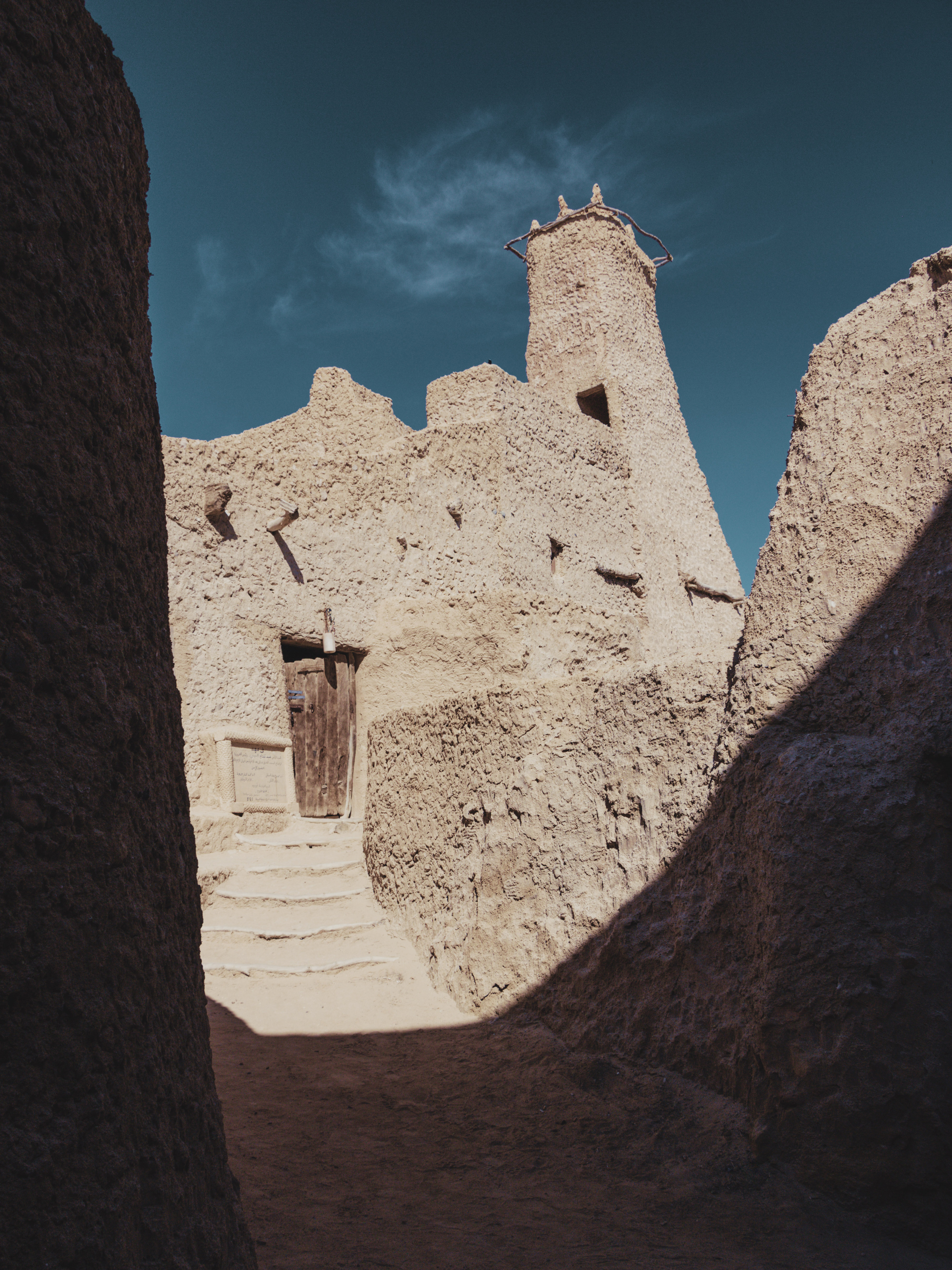
One of the mosque's entrances

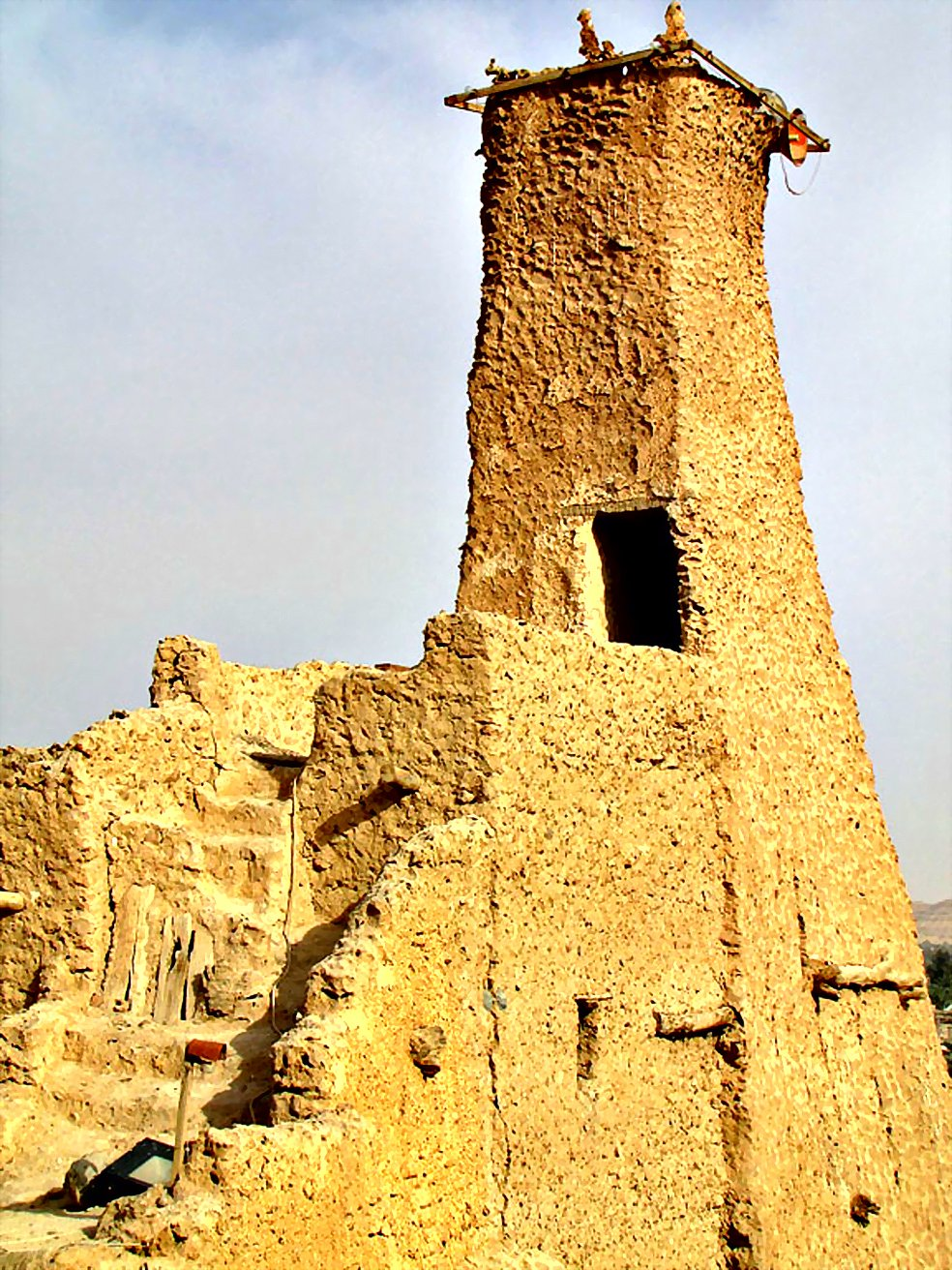
The mosque's minaret

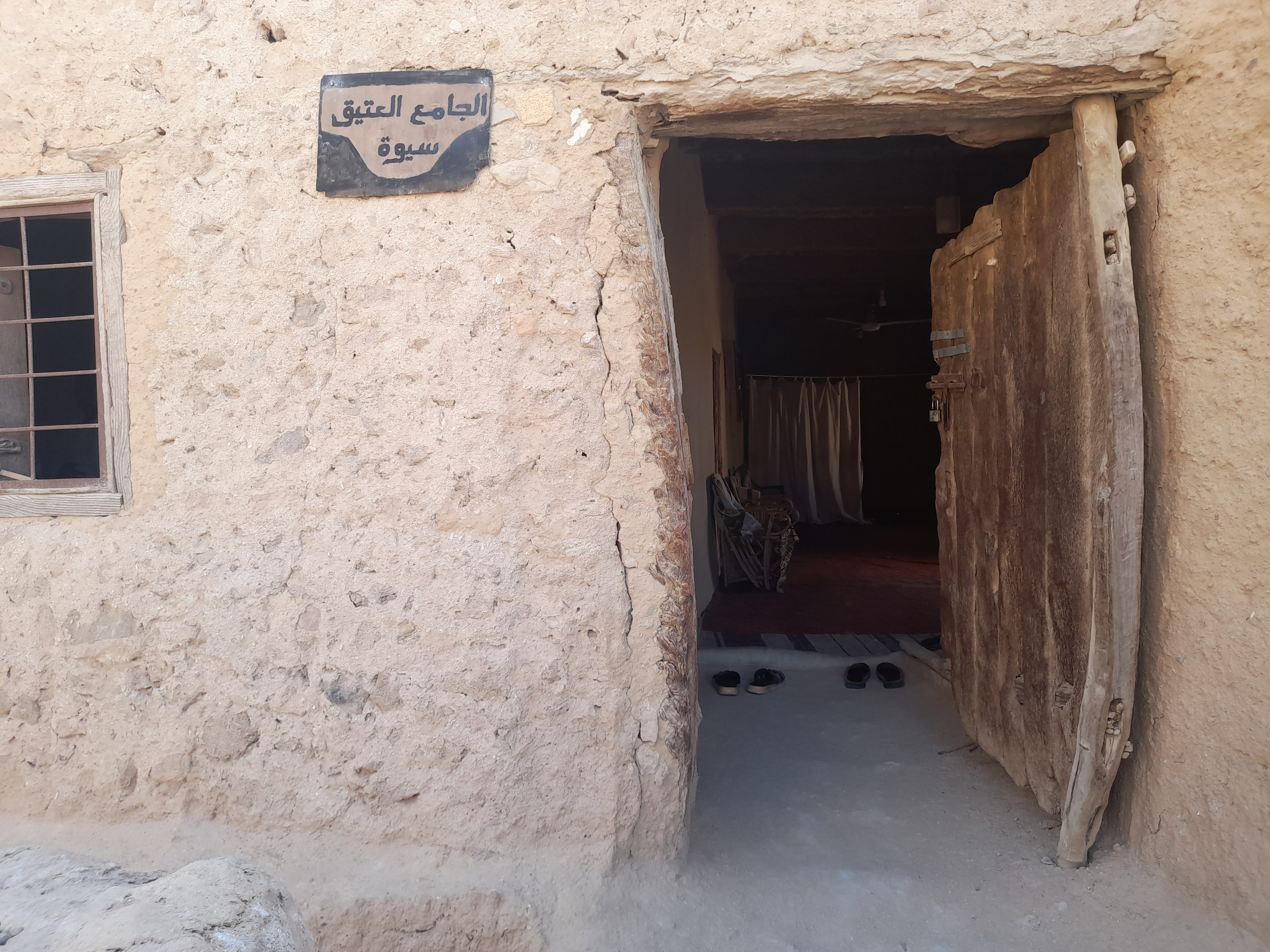
Another entrance to the mosque

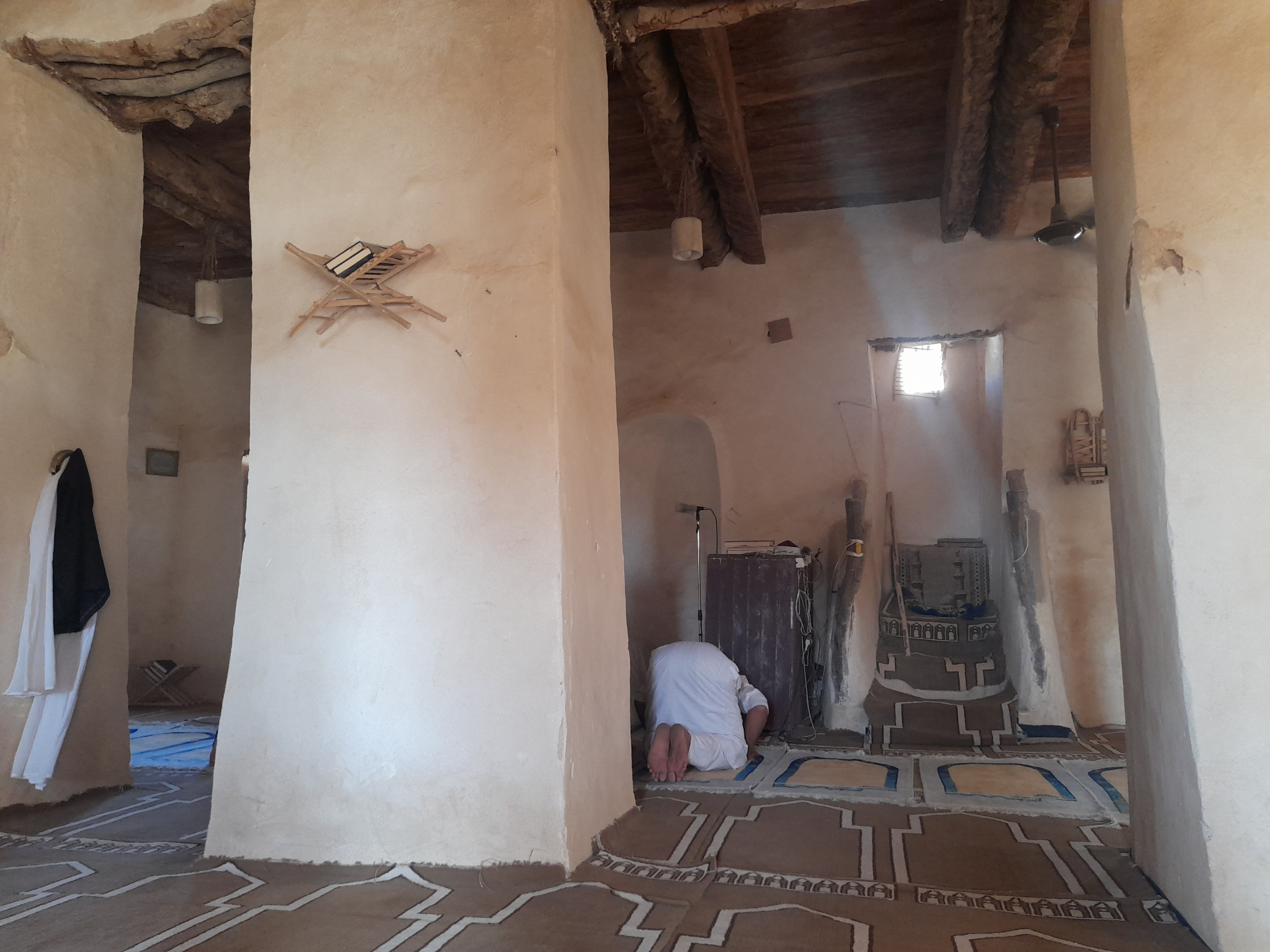
Layout of the mosque with the minbar and mihrab present

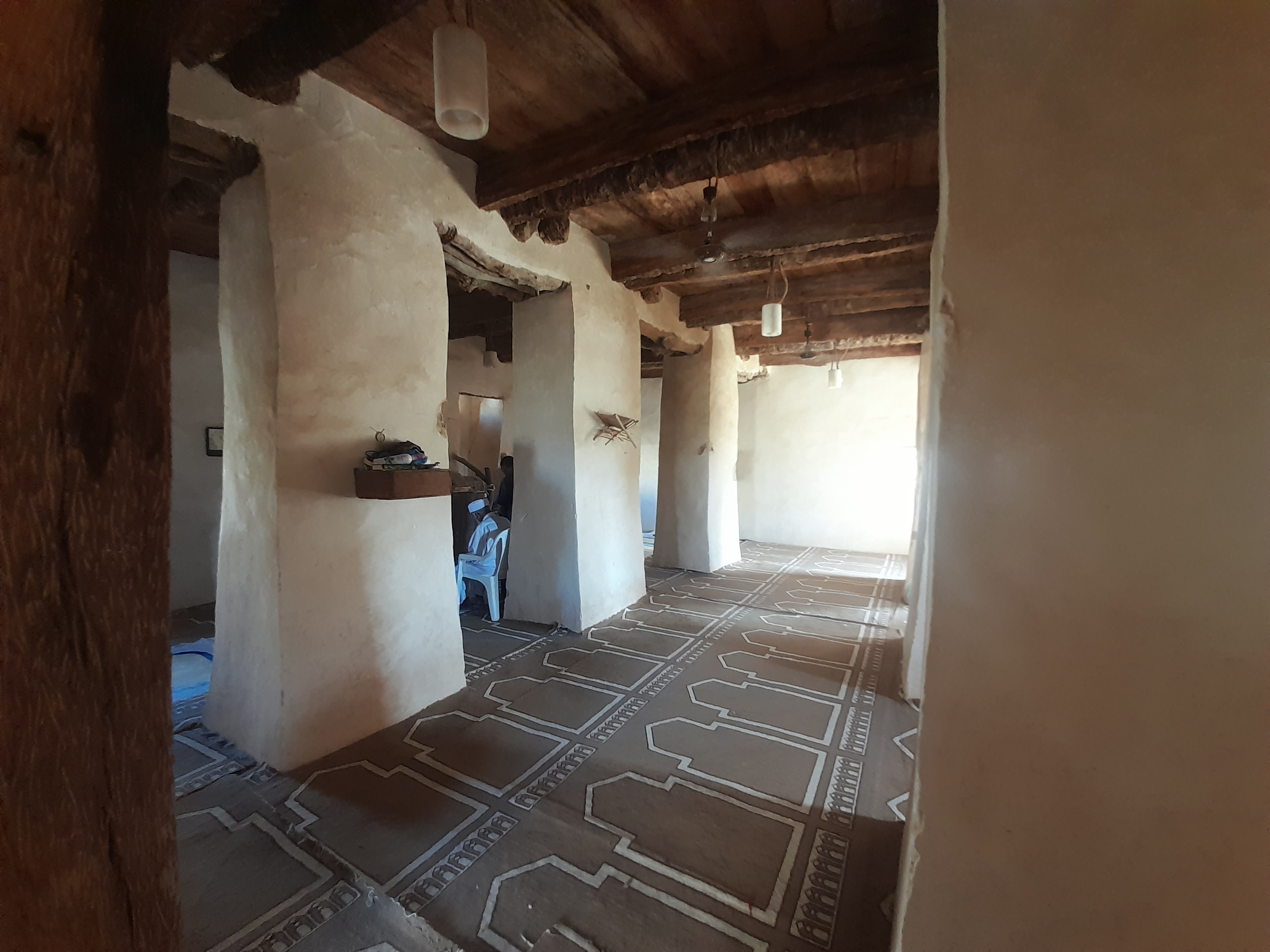
Picture with a clear view of the mosque's wooden roof

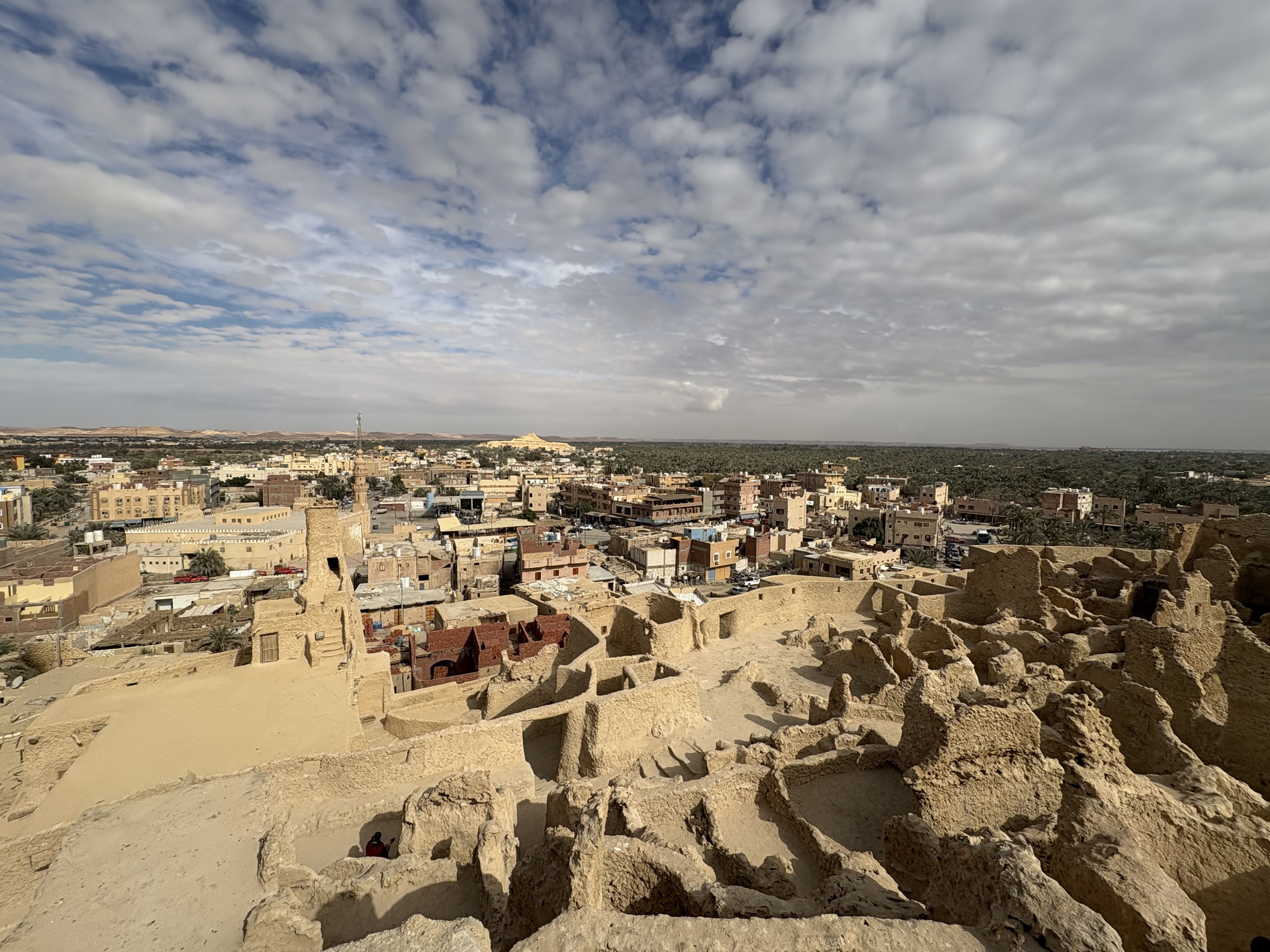
Picture of the mosque taken from inside the Shali fortress

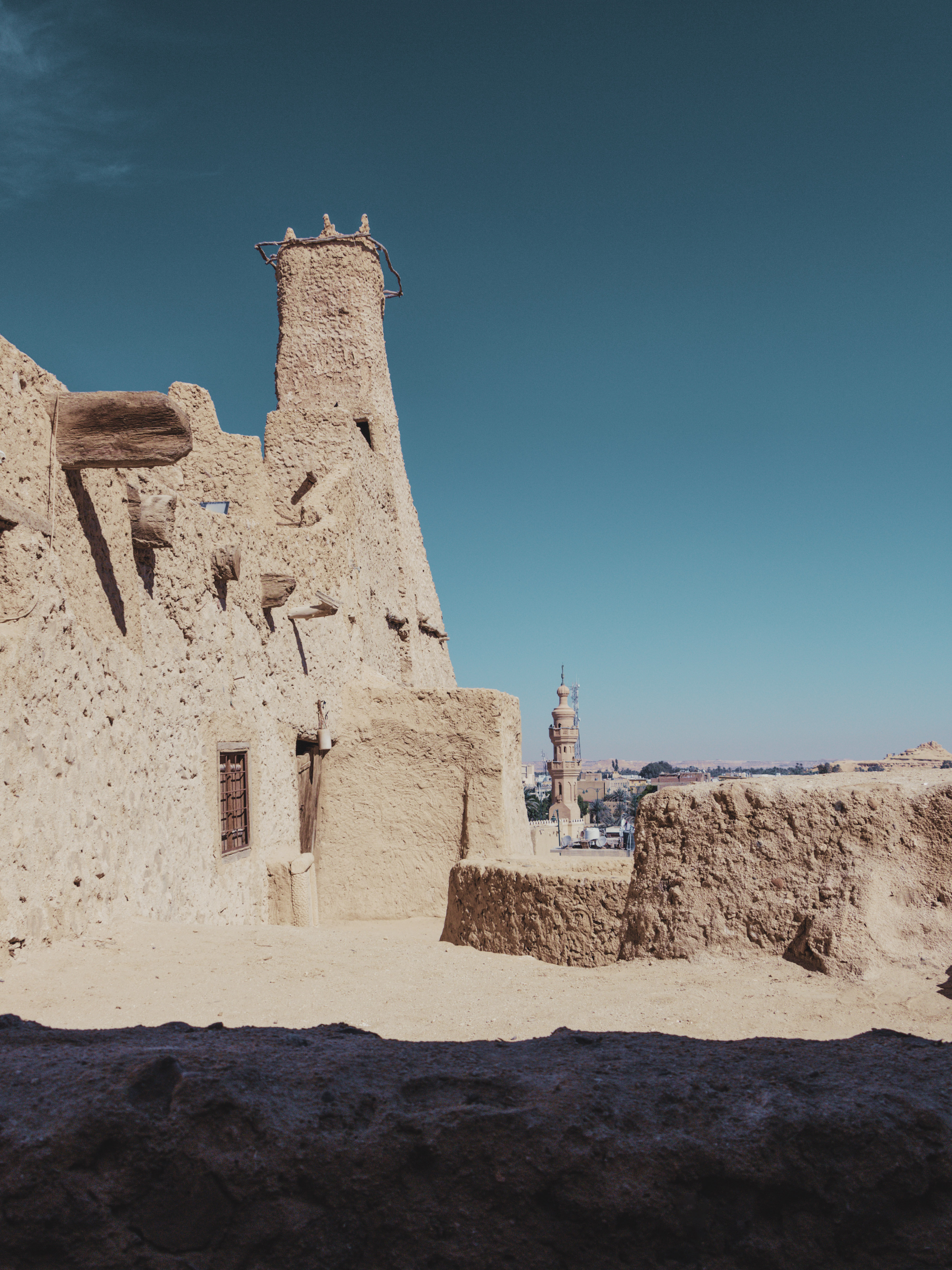
Picture with the King Fouad Mosque in the background

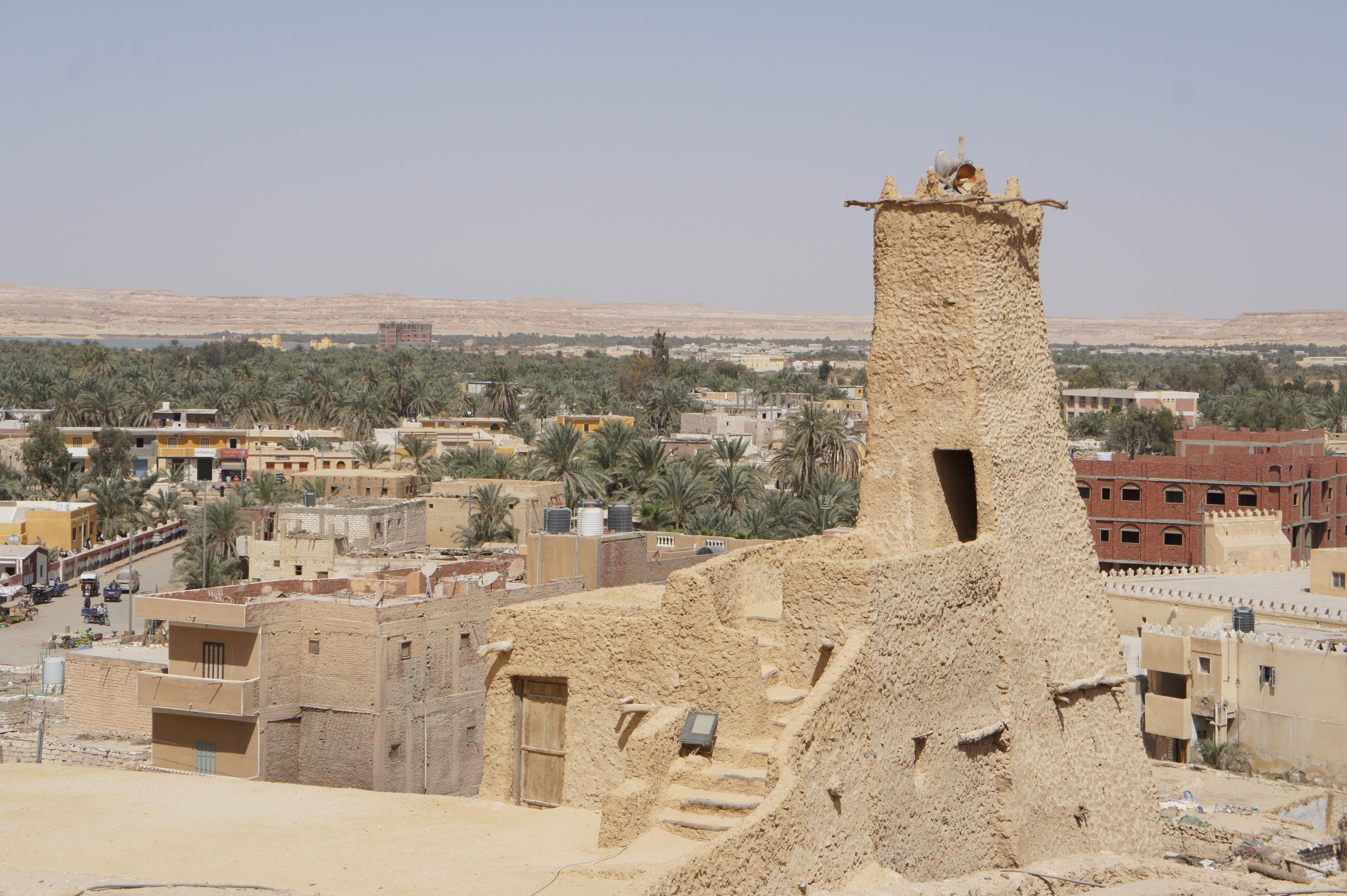
Panoramic picture of the mosque location in the Siwa Oasis
