= 2026 African Archery Championships =

International archery competition

- Host city: Oran, Algeria
- Organizers: World Archery Africa; Algerian Shooting Sport Federation
- Nations: 17 (127 competitors)
- Dates: 21–26 July
- Venues: Mediterranean Village

The 2026 African Archery Championships (Arabic: بطولة إفريقيا للرماية بالقوس والسهم 2026) was the 15th edition of the tournament, held in Mediterranean Village in Bir El Djir, Oran, Algeria, from 21 to 26 July 2026. The hosts Algeria finished as the most successful nation at the tournament.

For the first time in Africa, this Championship will include both Recurve under 21 categories and under 18 categories in addition to Senior categories. This edition will also be an important stage for the African athletes to prepare for both the 2026 Summer Youth Olympics in Dakar, Senegal in next November and the 2027 African Games in Cairo, Egypt on January, which will be the Continental Qualifier for the 2028 Olympic Games in Los Angeles, United States (Mixed Teams).

== Participating nations ==
127 archers from 17 nations taked part to the tournament:

1. Algeria (37)
2. Benin (8)
3. Cameroon (4)
4. Chad (2)
5. Egypt (5)
6. Ivory Coast (4)
7. Libya (11)
8. Mauritius (11)
9. Namibia (8)
10. Niger (2)
11. Nigeria (18)
12. Senegal (4)
13. South Africa (1)
14. Sudan (1)
15. Tunisia (6)
16. Uganda (3)
17. Zimbabwe (2)

== Medal summary ==
=== Recurve ===
Event	Gold	Silver	Bronze
Men's individual	Imadeddine Bakri; Algeria	Bahaa Eldin Aly; Egypt	Ryan Chan Yam; Mauritius
Women's individual	Roua Ben Abdelkader; Tunisia	Rania Hachani; Algeria	Yasmine Bellal; Algeria
Men's team	Algeria; Imadeddine Bakri; Rachad Bouakkaz; Yacine Imloul	Libya; Muhanad Al Mujreesi; Abdulmeniam Ali Arebi; Hisham Asuwee	Mauritius; Ryan Chan Yam; Tekbahadoursing Nekitsing; Aidan William Shiu Fook Sien
Women's team	Algeria; Chaima Aouiche; Yasmine Bellal; Rania Hachani	Benin; Dovi Amoussou-Guinnou; Adewale Paulirisse Gbaguidi; Merveille Santi Zinsou	—N/a
Mixed team	Tunisia; Roua Ben Abdelkader; Mohamed Hammed	Algeria; Rania Hachani; Yacine Imloul	Mauritius; Roukayyah Kodabaccus; Ryan Chan Yam
U-21 Men's individual	Ilyas Bouzouar; Algeria	Sid Ali Benterfaya; Algeria	Mohamed Khalf; Libya
U-21 Women's individual	Maria Drid; Algeria	Aya Meriem Benia; Algeria	Ikram Sahraoui; Algeria
U-21 Men's team	Libya; Abdul Malik Bahroun; Mohamed Khalf; Safwan Lasyoud	Algeria; Sid Ali Benterfaya; Ilyas Bouzouar; Abdelkrim Lazreg	—N/a
U-18 Men's individual	Ismail Ezzeldin; Egypt	Kouassi Chadrac Yao; Ivory Coast	Yugveer Jagadish Bissessur; Mauritius
U-18 Women's individual	Nouray Abdelrahman; Egypt	Farah Al Zarouq; Libya	Ritej Chaieb; Tunisia
U-18 Women's team	Algeria; Selma Malak Bedreddine; Maram Hadj Ali; Besmala Kouar	Libya; Maysam Al Barouni; Amina Al Saghezli; Farah Al Zarouq	—N/a
U-18 Mixed team	Egypt; Nouray Abdelrahman; Ismail Ezzeldin	Tunisia; Ritej Chaieb; Sassi El Khalil	Ivory Coast; Sita Sore; Kouassi Chadrac Yao
Para Men's individual	Precious Allan Asiimwe; Uganda	Abdelkader Izri; Algeria	Ravindra Bookun; Mauritius

=== Compound ===
Event	Gold	Silver	Bronze
Men's individual	Jannie Meeuwesen; Mauritius	Adrien Charoux; Mauritius	Alexandre Dabiani Fortuno; Mauritius
Women's individual	Jacqueline Coetzee; Namibia	Elisabeth Taljaard; Namibia	Hareke Evans-Uhegbu; Nigeria
Men's team	Mauritius; Adrien Charoux; Alexandre Dabiani Fortuno; Jacques Hok Haw Fan Lun	Nigeria; Aliyu Abubakar Garga; Seun Emmanuel Oyeleke; Damilola Sholademi	Algeria; Hamid Houmeur; Gharib Nouari; Ramdane Semache
Mixed team	Namibia; Elisabeth Taljaard; Jannie Meeuwesen	Nigeria; Hareke Evans-Uhegbu; Seun Emmanuel Oyeleke	Algeria; Sihem Akli; Ramdane Semache
Para Men's individual	Aliou Drame; Senegal	De Villiers Visser; Namibia	Alvin Iita; Namibia
Para Women's individual	Saimi Naango Shilunga; Namibia	—N/a	—N/a

=== Barebow ===
Event	Gold	Silver	Bronze
Men's individual	Junior Aristide Falang Delli; Cameroon	Nacim Younsi; Algeria	Francios Hendrik de Jager; South Africa
Women's individual	Marwa Rahmoun; Algeria	Faith Adekogbe; Nigeria	Hana Medjiah; Algeria
Men's team	Algeria; Chafik Mekki; Amine Nayli; Nacim Younsi	Nigeria; Abdul Rahman Obasa; Abdulbasit Sanni; Abubakar Usman	—N/a
Women's team	Nigeria; Faith Adekogbe; Mandu Eteidung; Precious Fanny-Amun	Algeria; Chaima Bedboudi; Hana Medjiah; Marwa Rahmoun	—N/a
Mixed team	Algeria; Marwa Rahmoun; Chafik Mekki	Nigeria; Faith Adekogbe; Abubakar Usman	—N/a

== Medal tables ==
=== Individual ===
* Host nation (Algeria)

Rank	Nation	Gold	Silver	Bronze	Total
1	Algeria*	4	5	3	12
2	Namibia	3	2	1	6
3	Egypt	2	1	0	3
4	Tunisia	1	0	1	2
5	Cameroon	1	0	0	1
5	Senegal	1	0	0	1
5	Uganda	1	0	0	1
8	Mauritius	0	1	4	5
9	Libya	0	1	1	2
9	Nigeria	0	1	1	2
11	Ivory Coast	0	1	0	1
12	South Africa	0	0	1	1
Totals (12 entries)		13	12	12	37

=== Teams ===
* Host nation (Algeria)

Rank	Nation	Gold	Silver	Bronze	Total
1	Algeria*	5	3	2	10
2	Nigeria	1	4	0	5
3	Libya	1	2	0	3
4	Tunisia	1	1	0	2
5	Mauritius	1	0	2	3
6	Egypt	1	0	0	1
6	Namibia	1	0	0	1
8	Benin	0	1	0	1
9	Ivory Coast	0	0	1	1
Totals (9 entries)		11	11	5	27
