= Siwi people =

Ethnic group in Egypt

Siwi
Isiwan; سيويون
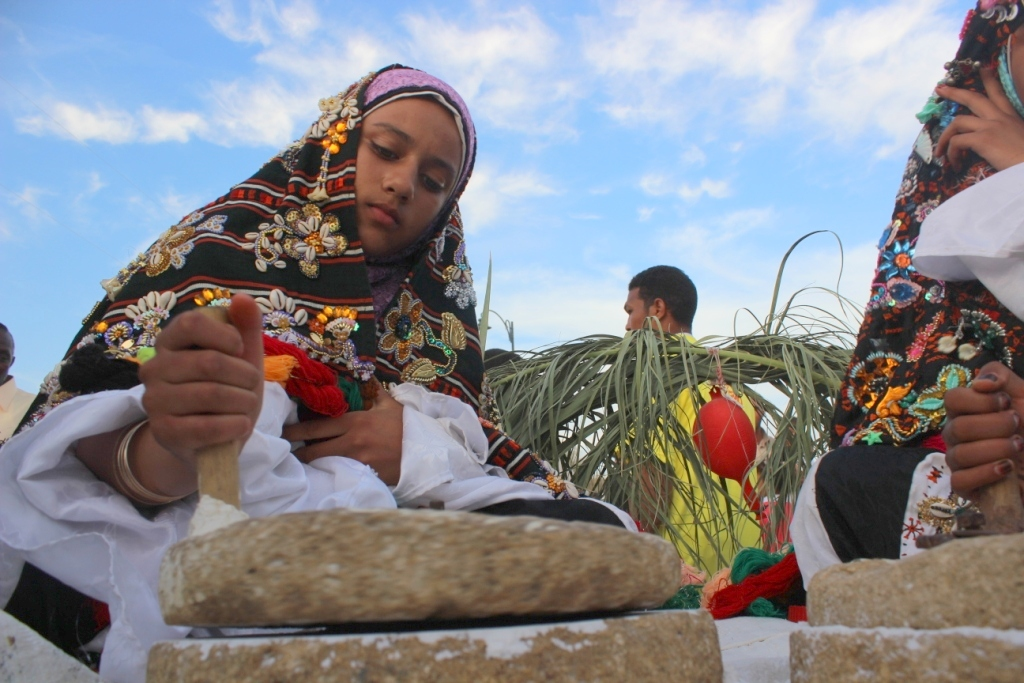
- A girl from the Siwa ethnic group grinds salt with a hand crank.

Total population
- c. 31,100

Regions with significant populations
- Egypt: 30,000
- Libya: 1,100

Languages
- Siwi, Egyptian Arabic, Libyan Arabic

Religion
- Islam

Related ethnic groups
- Other Berbers

The Siwi people or Siwan people (Berber languages: Isiwan; Arabic: سيويون), are a Berber ethnic group of about 30,000 native to Egypt's Siwa and Qara oases. They speak the Siwi language, a Berber language, spoken by about 20,000, along with Egyptian and Libyan Arabic. The Siwi are the easternmost concentration of Berbers.

== History ==
The Siwi people are directly descended from the Banu Wasin tribe, which was part of the large Berber-speaking Zenata tribal confederation spread throughout the Maghreb.
