= South African National Archery Association =

South African archery organization

- Sport: Archery
- Jurisdiction: South Africa
- Abbreviation: SANAA
- Founded: 1949
- Affiliation: WAF
- Regional affiliation: FAA

Official website
- www.sanaa.org.za
- (South Africa)

South African National Archery Association (SANAA) is the national governing body for the sport of archery in South Africa, recognised by the World Archery Federation. It was officially established on 17 November 1949.

It is affiliated to a number of sporting bodies, including the international governing body World Archery Federation, the continental Federation of African Archery (FAA) and South African Sports Confederation and Olympic Committee (SASCOC). SANAA committee consists of Executive members and Representatives from the Provincial bodies. The executive committee is elected by representatives of the provincial archery associations at the annual Congress at the South African National Outdoor Target Archery Championships. Members are invited as observers to Congress and members, through their clubs and provinces elect a representative, who represents the provincial archery association at the annual congress.

== See also ==
- Sport in South Africa
