= 2022 African Archery Championships =

Continental Sports Championship

- Venue: Tuks Archery club
- Location: Pretoria, South Africa
- Start date: 5 November
- End date: 10 November

The 2022 African Archery Championships was the 12th edition of the African Archery Championships. The event was held in Pretoria, the capital city of South Africa from 5 to 10 November 2022. It featured a total of 66 competing archers from 16 countries.

== Medal summary ==
=== Recurve ===
Event	Gold	Silver	Bronze
Men's individual	(South Africa) Wian Roux	(Ivory Coast) Franck Eyeni	(Tunisia) Mohamed Hammed
Women's individual	(Ivory Coast) Ekpobi Anne-Marie Eléonord Yedagne	(Kenya) Kuki Anwar	(Algeria) Yasmine Bellal
Men's team	South Africa	Egypt	Algeria
Women's team	Ivory Coast	Kenya	South Africa
Mixed team	Ivory Coast	Tunisia	Algeria

=== Compound ===
Event	Gold	Silver	Bronze
Men's individual	(South Africa) Christian Beyers De Klerk	(South Africa) Richard Anderson	(Egypt) Ahmed Fakhry
Women's individual	(South Africa) Jeanine Van Kradenburg	(South Africa) Marie-Louise Vermeulen	(South Africa) Rozan Gilbert
Men's team	South Africa	Nigeria	
Mixed team	South Africa	Nigeria	

=== Medal table ===
Rank	Nation	Gold	Silver	Bronze	Total
1	South Africa	6	2	2	10
2	Ivory Coast	3	1	0	4
3	Kenya	0	2	0	2
4	Egypt	0	1	1	2
4	Tunisia	0	1	1	2
6	Algeria	0	0	3	3
Totals (6 entries)		9	7	7	23
