= Siwa Oasis =

Siwa Oasis واحة سيوة Isiwan
- Oasis
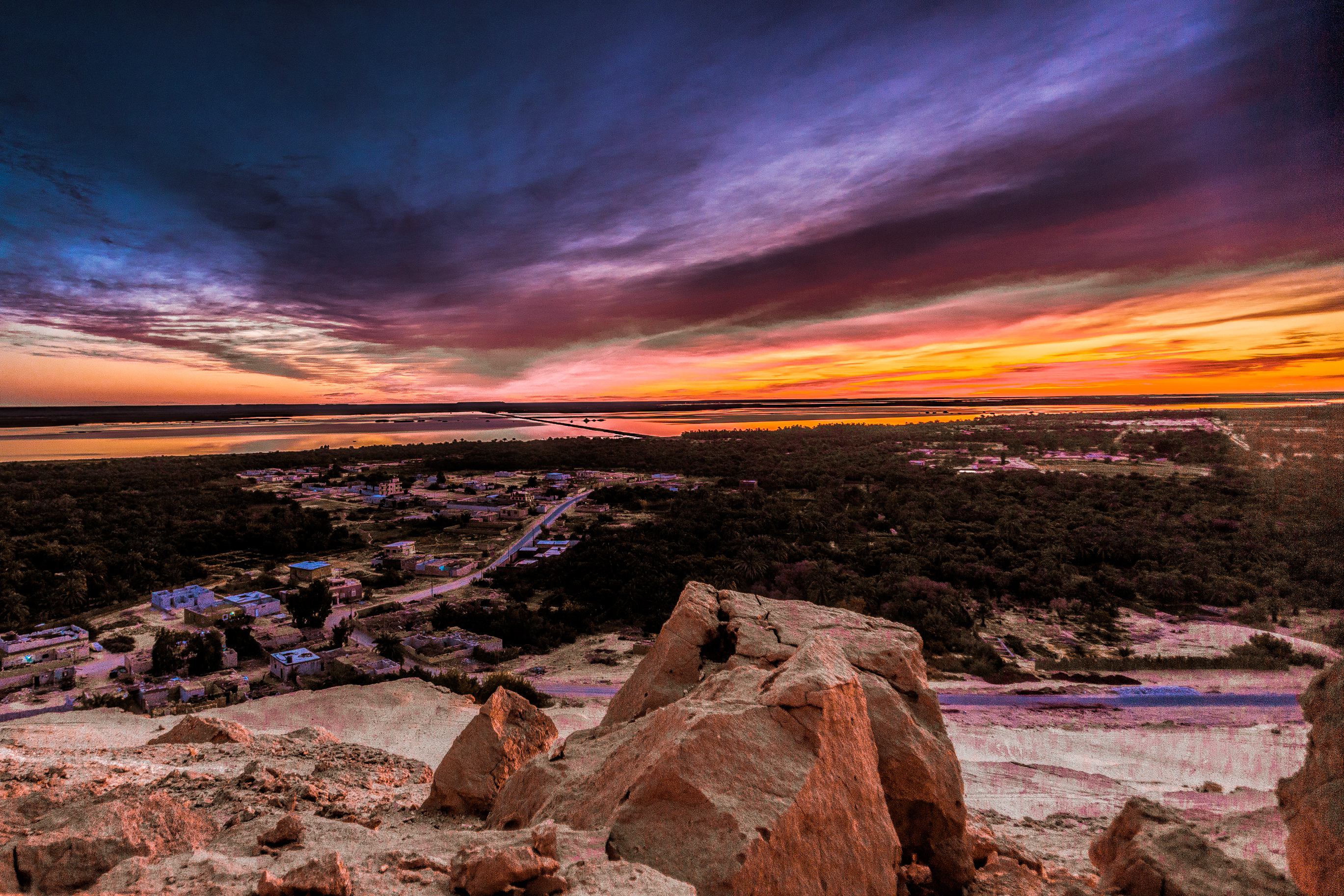
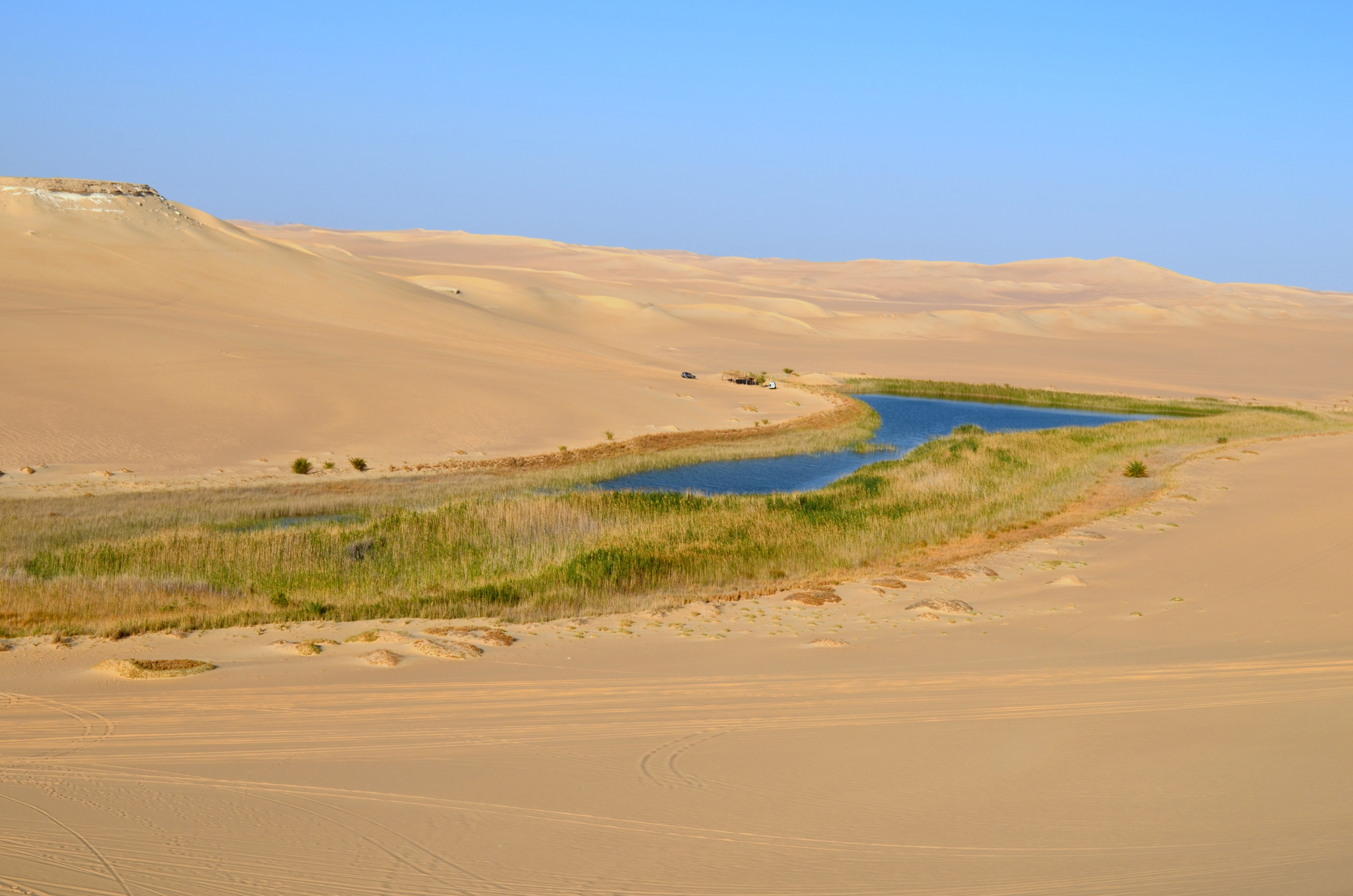
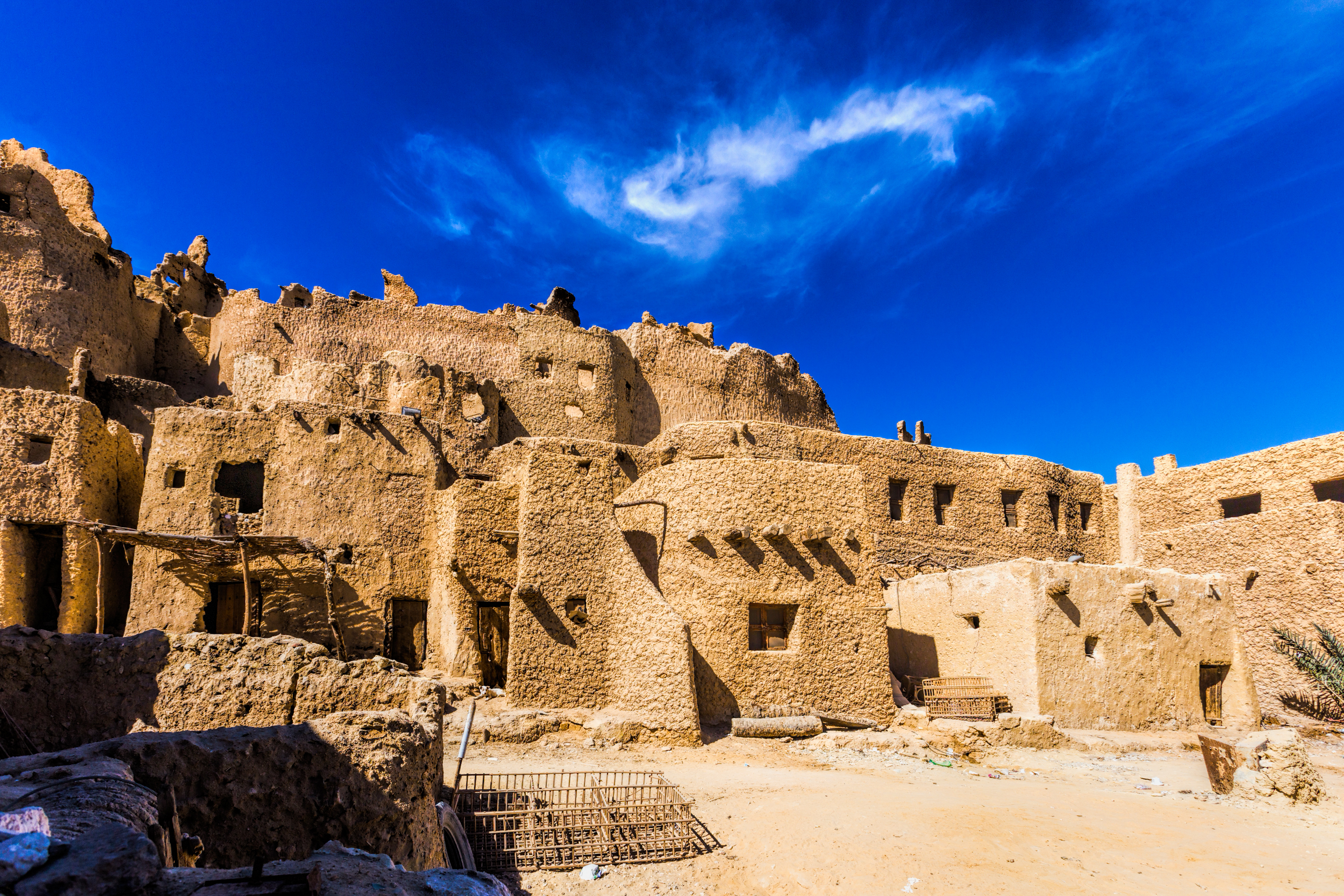
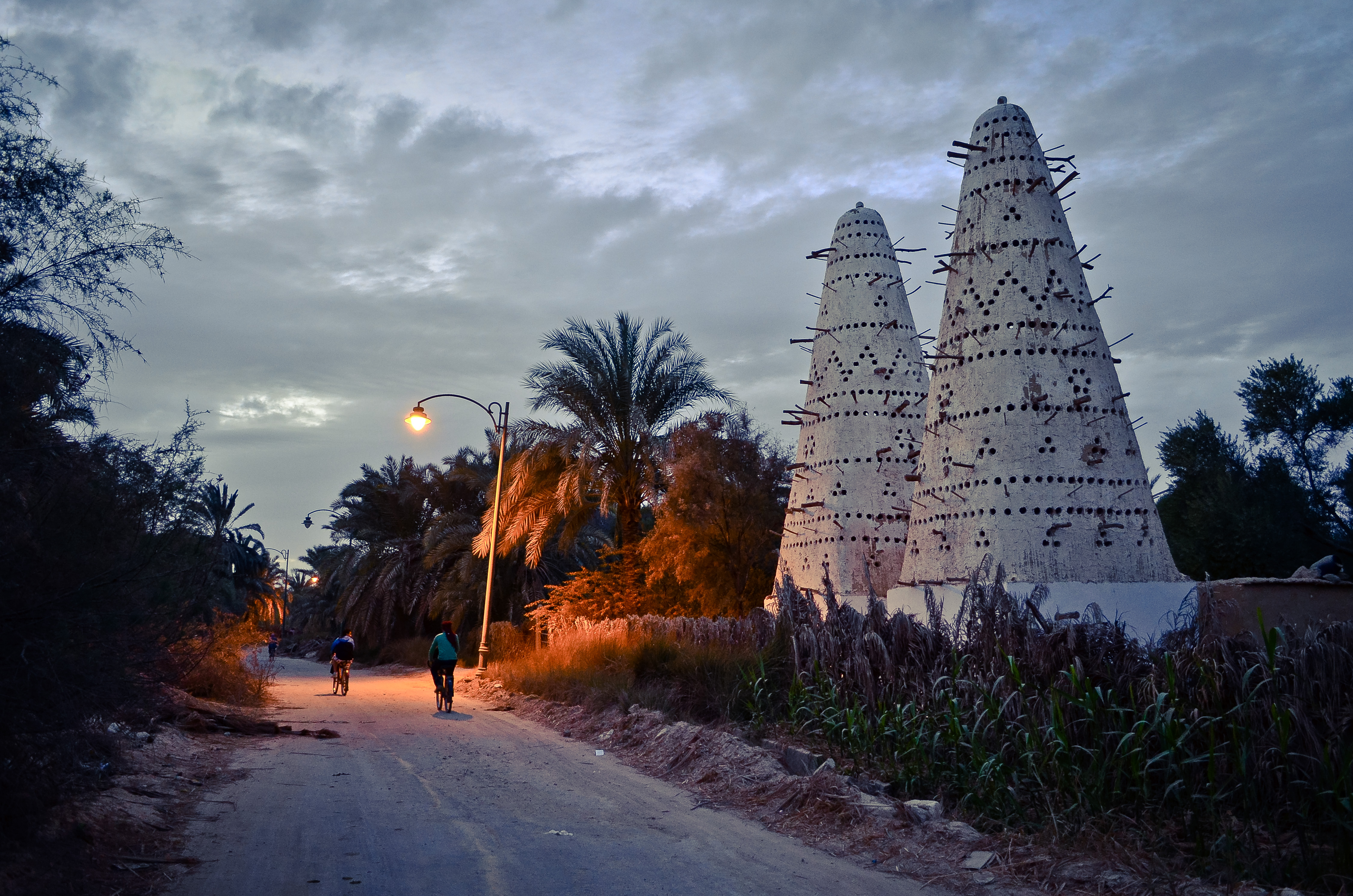
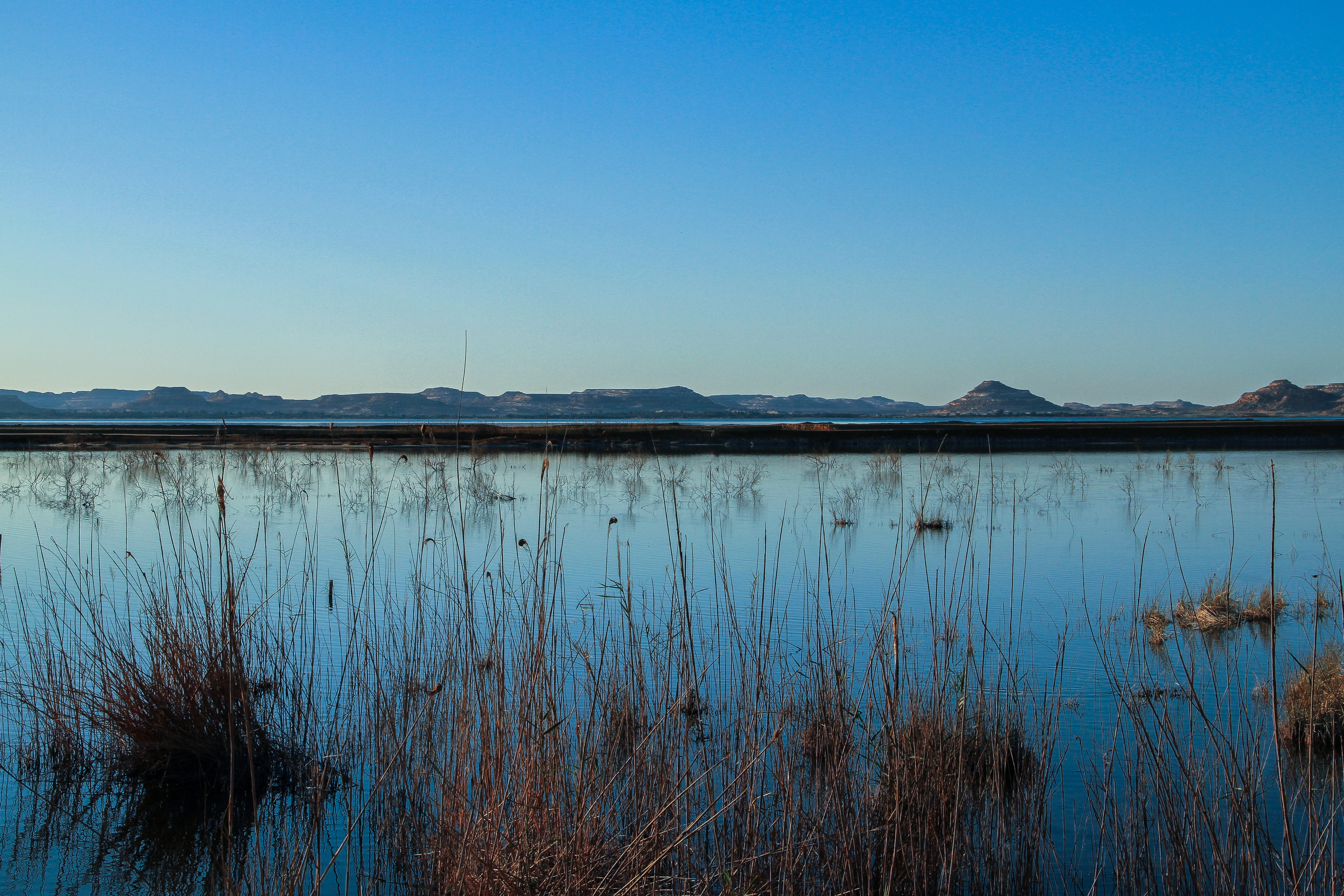
- Clockwise from top: Shali Mountain village, Ruins of the Old Siwa, Lake Aftnas, Pigeon Towers, oasis near Siwa.

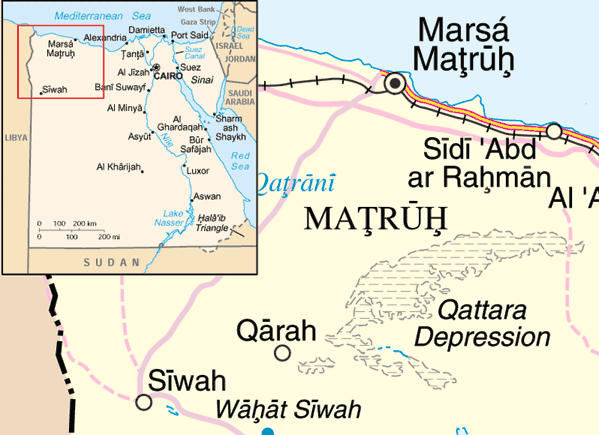
- Location within Qattara Depression

- Location in Egypt
- Coordinates: 29°12′19″N 25°31′10″E
- Country: Egypt
- Governorate: Matrouh

Area
  - Total: 78 sq mi (201 km^{2})
- Elevation: −62 ft (−19 m)

Population
  - Estimate (2021): 25,031
- Demonym: Siwi
- Time zone: UTC+2 (EST)
  - Summer (DST): UTC+2 (EET)

The Siwa Oasis (Arabic: واحة سيوة Wāḥat Sīwah [ˈwæːħet ˈsiːwæ]) is an urban oasis in Egypt. It is situated between the Qattara Depression and the Great Sand Sea in the Western Desert, 50 kilometres (31 mi) east of the Egypt–Libya border and 560 kilometres (350 mi) from the Egyptian capital city of Cairo. It is famed for its role in ancient Egypt as the home to an oracle of Amun, the ruins of which are a popular tourist attraction, giving it the ancient name Oasis of Amun-Ra, after the major Egyptian deity.

== Geography ==
The oasis is in a deep depression that reaches −19 metres (−62 ft) below sea level. To the west, the al Jaghbub Oasis rests in a similar depression and to the east, the large Qattara Depression is also below sea level. The depression is fertile due to both natural flowing artesian wells and irrigation. It is the site of about 200 natural springs. Siwa is directly adjacent to the Libyan Desert plateau. The geology is characterised by horizontal layers of porous limestones alternated with marls and clays dating back to the Miocene. The limestone plateau and inselbergs resulting from the oasis' erosion along the dunes create reliefs that the Isiwan describe as mountains (adrar in Tamazight). Two large salt lakes are fed by drainage water of agricultural origin. The oasis supports the cultivation of thousands of date palms and olives. Siwa has a temperate desert climate.

== Name ==
sxt iAm iAm iAm xAst
sḫt jꜣmw
in hieroglyphs
Era: Late Period
(664–332 BC)

The Ancient Egyptian name of the oasis was sḫt jꜣmw, meaning "Field of Trees". The native Libyan toponym may be preserved in the Egyptian t̠ꜣ(j) n d̠rw "tꜣj on the fringe" where t̠ꜣ transcribed the local Palaeo-Berber name *Se or *Sa. This name survived in the works of Muslim geographers as سنترية Santariyyah.

Siwah is the Arabic name of the oasis called Sali in Berber. The oasis is also called Isiwan in modern Berber.

The etymology of the word سيوة Siwah is unclear. Champollion derives it from Coptic ⲥⲟⲟⲩϩ (soouh) – a corruption of the Egyptian word for "oasis", ⲟⲩⲁϩ (ouoh). The additional evidence of the Egyptian source of Siwa's name is another place name in Kharga Oasis that may share the same etymology – S.t-wȝḥ, modern Deir el-Hagar). Basset links it to a Berber tribal name swh attested further west in the early Islamic period, while Ilahiane, following Chafik, links it to the Shilha Berber word asiwan, a type of bird of prey, and hence to Amun-Ra, one of whose symbols was the falcon. Some classical authors referred to the site as "Ammonium".

== History ==
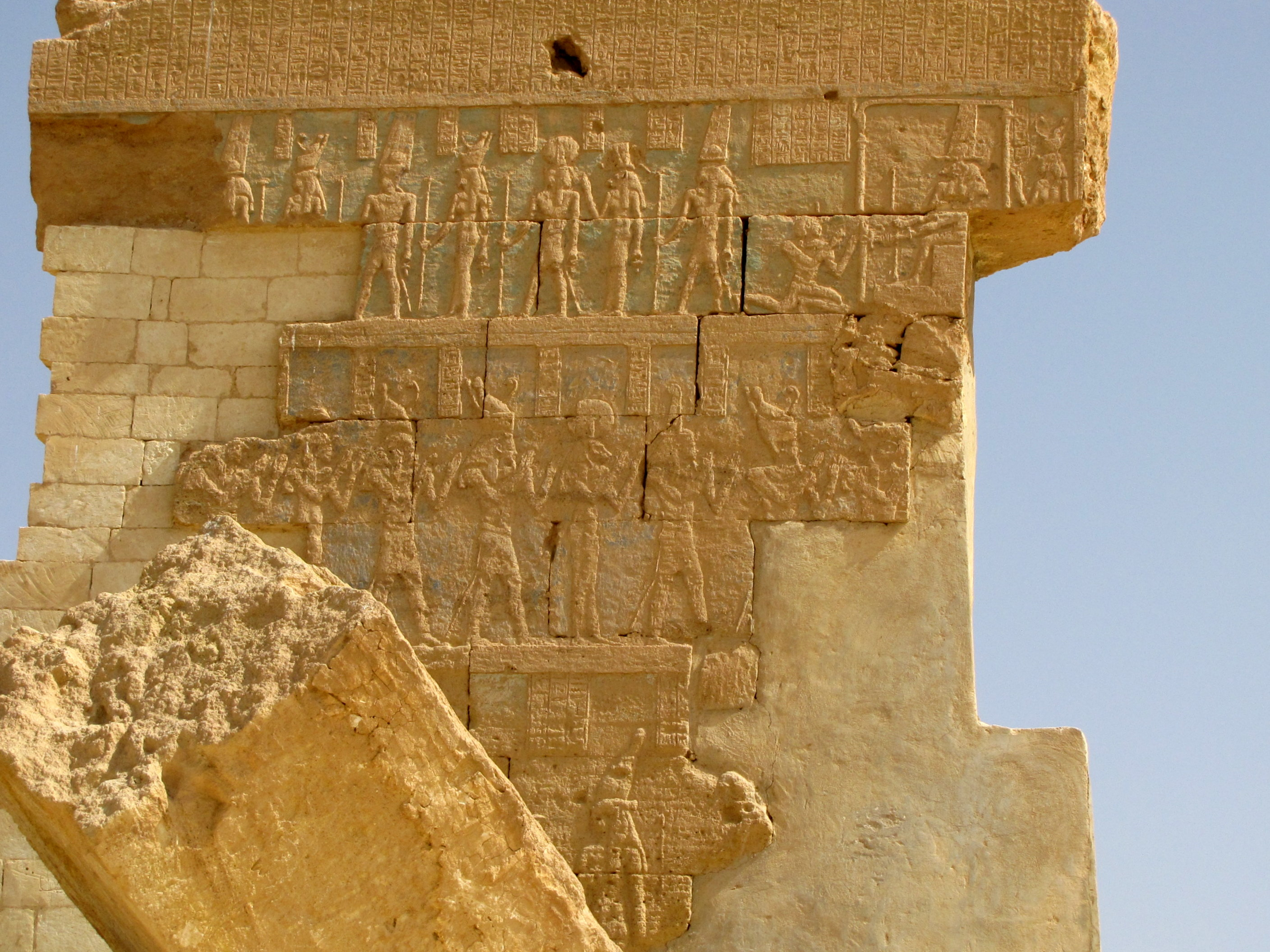
Last standing wall at the Temple of Amun at Umm 'Ubeida

Although the site is known to have been settled since at least the 10th millennium BCE, the earliest evidence of any connection with Ancient Egypt is the 26th Dynasty, when a necropolis was established. Ancient Greek settlers at Cyrene made contact with the oasis around the same time (7th century BCE), and the oracle temple of Amun (Greek: Zeus Ammon), who, Herodotus was told, took the image here of a ram. Herodotus knew of a "fountain of the Sun" that ran coldest in the noontime heat. During his campaign to conquer the Persian Empire, Alexander the Great reached the oasis, supposedly by following birds across the desert. The oracle, Alexander's court historians alleged, confirmed him as both a divine personage and the legitimate Pharaoh of Egypt, though Alexander's motives in making the excursion, following his founding of Alexandria, remain to some extent inscrutable and contested. During the Ptolemaic Kingdom, its Ancient Egyptian name was sḫ.t-ỉm3w, meaning "Field of Trees".

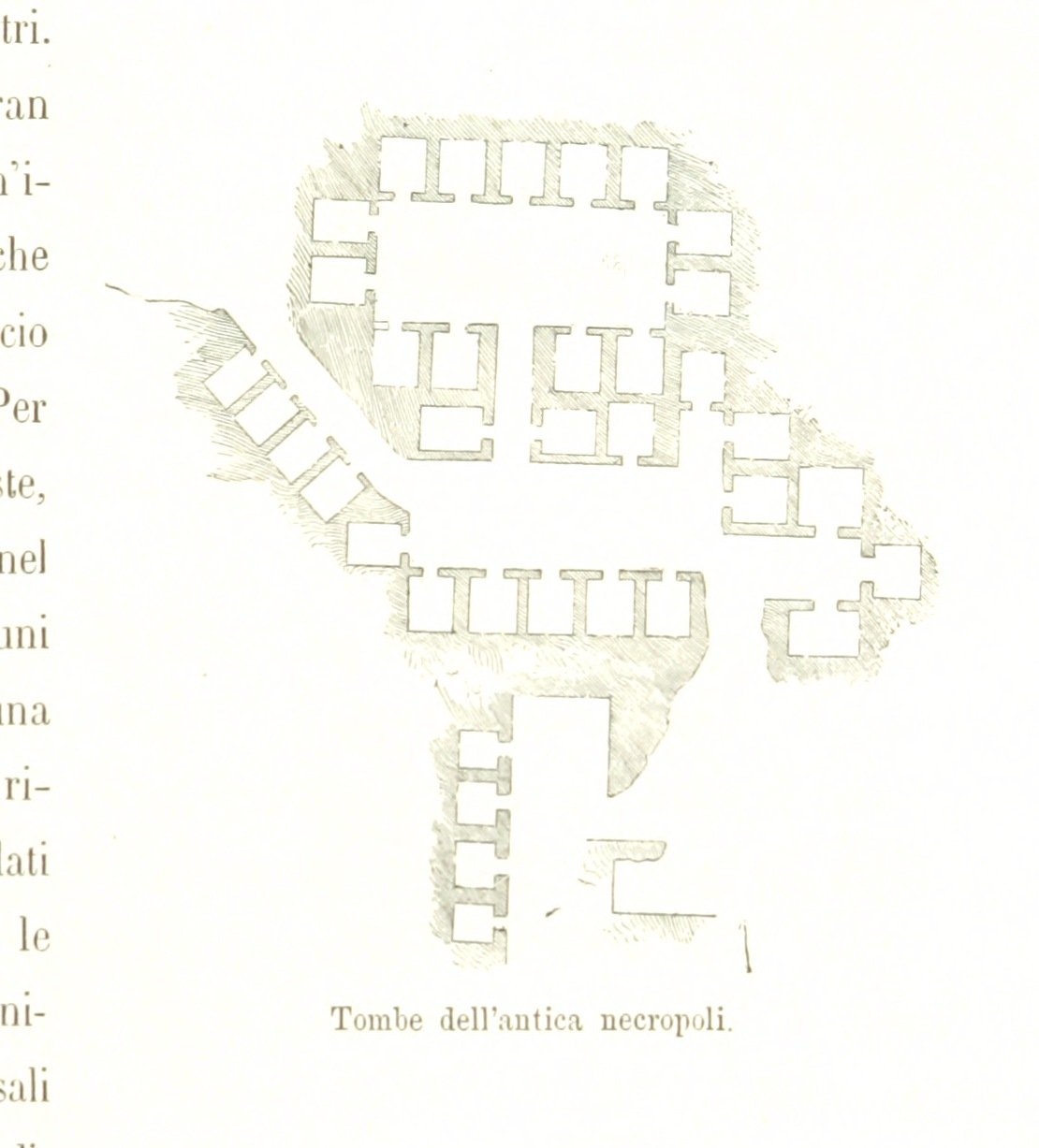
Temple of Amun in Siwa - Necropolis (1890); by: Robecchi-Bricchetti, Luigi

In the 12th century, Al-Idrisi mentions it as being inhabited mainly by Berbers, with an Arab minority; a century earlier, Al-Bakri stated that only Berbers lived there. The Egyptian historian Al-Maqrizi travelled to Siwa in the 15th century and described how the language spoken there 'is similar to the language of the Zenata'.

The first European to document a visit since Roman times was the English traveller William George Browne, who came in 1792 to see the ancient temple of the Oracle of Amun. Bompiani, in her description of the 19th-century explorer Luigi Robecchi Bricchetti, called this site the Oasis of Jupiter Ammon.

Siwa was annexed by Muhammad Ali of Egypt in 1820, but the Egyptian representative in Siwa was assassinated in 1838. At some point, Muhammad al-Sanusi stayed at Siwa for a few months and gathered some followers there. Later, Siwa was a base of the Sanusiyya in their fight against the British from 1915 to 1917. Meanwhile, in the spring of 1893, German explorer and photographer Hermann Burchardt took photographs of the architecture of the town of Siwa, now stored at the Ethnological Museum of Berlin.

Egyptian rule from distant Cairo was at first tenuous and marked by several revolts. Egypt began to assert firmer control after a 1928 visit to the oasis by King Fuad I, who berated the locals for homosexual practices and specified punishments to bring Siwan behaviour in line with Egyptian morals.

Siwa was also the site of some fighting during World War I and World War II. The British Army's Long Range Desert Group (LRDG) was based here, but Rommel's Afrika Korps also took possession three times. German soldiers went skinny dipping in the lake of the oracle, contrary to local customs which prohibit public nudity. In 1942, while the Italian 136th Infantry Division Giovani Fascisti occupied the oasis, a tiny Egyptian puppet government-in-exile was set up at Siwa. The oasis makes a brief appearance as a base of the LRDG in the 1958 war film Ice Cold in Alex.

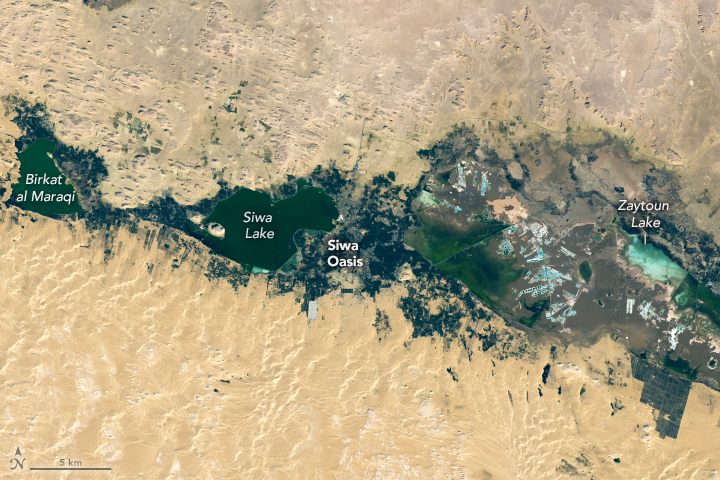
Siwa Oasis from space, January 23, 2023

The ancient fortress of Siwa, known as the Shali Ghadi (Shali being the name of the town, and Ghadi meaning "remote"), was built on natural rock (an inselberg) and made of kershif (salt and mud-brick) and palm logs. After it was damaged by three days of heavy rains in 1926 it was abandoned for similar unreinforced construction housing on the plain surrounding it, and in some cases those, in turn, have been replaced by more modern cinder block and sheet metal roof buildings. Only one building in the Shali complex, a mosque, has been repaired and is in use. Gradually eroded by infrequent rains and slowly collapsing, the Shali remains a prominent feature, towering five stories above the modern town and lit at night by floodlights. It is most easily approached from its southwest side, south of the end of the paved road which curves around from the north side of the Shali. Several uneven pedestrian streets lead from the southwest end of the Shali into it, and the ground is split in places by deep cracks. Many of the unreinforced kershif buildings bordering the streets of the Shali are also split by large cracks, or they are partially collapsed.

Other local historic sites of interest include the remains of the oracle temple; the Gebel al Mawta (the Mountain of the Dead), a Roman-era necropolis featuring dozens of rock-cut tombs; and "Cleopatra's Bath", an antique natural spring. The fragmentary remains of the oracle temple, with some inscriptions dating from the 4th century BCE, lie within the ruins of Aghurmi. The revelations of the oracle fell into disrepute under the Roman rule over Egypt.

== Climate ==
Köppen-Geiger climate classification system classifies its climate as hot desert (BWh), as the rest of Egypt. The area might experience temperatures above 40 °C (104 °F) as early as March due to the extreme heat burst brought by the Khamsin wind. The highest temperature ever recorded occurred on June 13, 1965 with a value of 48.2 °C (118.8 °F).

Climate data for Siwa Oasis (1991–2020 normals)
Month	Jan	Feb	Mar	Apr	May	Jun	Jul	Aug	Sep	Oct	Nov	Dec	Year
Record high °C (°F)	32.2 (90.0)	35.3 (95.5)	41.6 (106.9)	44.8 (112.6)	48.0 (118.4)	48.2 (118.8)	47.3 (117.1)	46.5 (115.7)	46.0 (114.8)	42.4 (108.3)	37.8 (100.0)	31.5 (88.7)	48.2 (118.8)
Mean daily maximum °C (°F)	19.8 (67.6)	22.1 (71.8)	26.2 (79.2)	31.6 (88.9)	36.1 (97.0)	39.7 (103.5)	40.2 (104.4)	40.4 (104.7)	37.3 (99.1)	32.8 (91.0)	26.3 (79.3)	21.2 (70.2)	31.1 (88.0)
Daily mean °C (°F)	13.0 (55.4)	14.7 (58.5)	18.6 (65.5)	23.2 (73.8)	27.7 (81.9)	31.2 (88.2)	32.4 (90.3)	32.4 (90.3)	29.6 (85.3)	25.2 (77.4)	19.2 (66.6)	14.5 (58.1)	23.5 (74.3)
Mean daily minimum °C (°F)	6.1 (43.0)	7.3 (45.1)	10.9 (51.6)	14.8 (58.6)	19.3 (66.7)	22.6 (72.7)	24.3 (75.7)	24.6 (76.3)	21.8 (71.2)	17.2 (63.0)	12.1 (53.8)	7.8 (46.0)	15.8 (60.4)
Record low °C (°F)	−2.2 (28.0)	−1.3 (29.7)	0.3 (32.5)	5.0 (41.0)	7.5 (45.5)	14.0 (57.2)	17.5 (63.5)	15.9 (60.6)	11.7 (53.1)	7.8 (46.0)	2.9 (37.2)	−0.7 (30.7)	−2.2 (28.0)
Average precipitation mm (inches)	2.5 (0.10)	3.5 (0.14)	1.8 (0.07)	0.5 (0.02)	0.1 (0.00)	0.0 (0.0)	0.0 (0.0)	0.0 (0.0)	0.1 (0.00)	0.6 (0.02)	1.3 (0.05)	1.5 (0.06)	12.0 (0.47)
Average precipitation days (≥ 1.0 mm)	0.5	0.4	0.3	0.1	0.1	0.0	0.0	0.0	0.0	0.1	0.2	0.4	2.1
Average relative humidity (%)	55	48	40	33	31	29	32	37	40	45	51	57	41.5
Average dew point °C (°F)	4.1 (39.4)	4.0 (39.2)	4.5 (40.1)	5.2 (41.4)	7.6 (45.7)	10.4 (50.7)	13.5 (56.3)	14.2 (57.6)	13.0 (55.4)	10.8 (51.4)	8.2 (46.8)	5.4 (41.7)	8.4 (47.1)
Mean monthly sunshine hours	231	248	282	303	341	360	354	363	315	291	246	221	3,555
Source: NOAA

== Culture ==
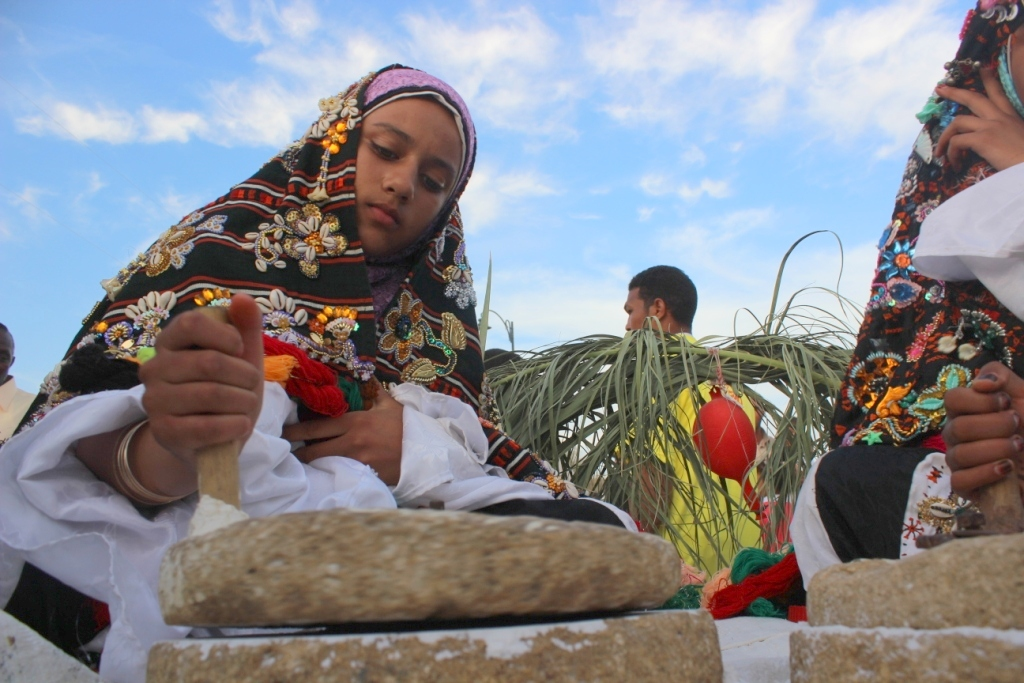
Girl wearing the traditional dress of Siwa grinding salt

The traditional culture of Siwa shows many unique elements, some reflecting its longstanding links with the isolated oasis life and the fact that the inhabitants are Siwi Berbers. There are 10 tribes in Siwa that speak an eastern Berber language (Siwi). These tribes have their own cultures and ideals. Until a tarmac road was built to the Mediterranean coast in the 1980s Siwa's only links with the outside world were by arduous camel tracks through the desert. These were used to export dates and olives, bring trade goods, or carry pilgrims on the route which linked the Maghreb to Cairo and hence to Mecca.

As a result of this isolation, Siwis developed a unique natural culture manifested in its crafts of basketry, pottery, silverwork and embroidery and in its style of dress. The most visible and celebrated examples of this were the bridal silver and the ensemble of silver ornaments and beads that women wore in abundance to weddings and other ceremonies. These pieces were decorated with symbols which related to Siwa's history and beliefs and attitudes.

The arrival of the road and of television exposed the oasis to the styles and fashions of the outside world and the traditional silver ornaments were gradually replaced by jewelry made of gold. Evidence of the old styles and traditions are however still in evidence in the women's embroidery and costume. The material for the "tarfutet", the distinctive all-enveloping shawl worn by women, are brought from outside the oasis, specifically from the town of Kirdasa in the Giza Governorate.

=== Jewelry ===
The best known of these pieces is a huge silver disc called 'adrim' and a round necklace, called 'aghraw', from which it hung over the breast. A girl would give up the disc at a special ceremony in the spring the day she was married. The jewelry, which was made by local silversmiths, consisted of silver necklaces, earrings, bangles, hair ornaments, pendants, and many rings. For a wealthy woman, the full ensemble could weigh as much as five or six kilos. These pieces are decorated with symbols common to Berber people across North Africa designed to promote good health, fertility and to protect the wearer from misfortune. Some of the same signs and patterns are found on the embroidery which embellishes women's dresses, trousers, and shawls.

Siwi Berber jewelry

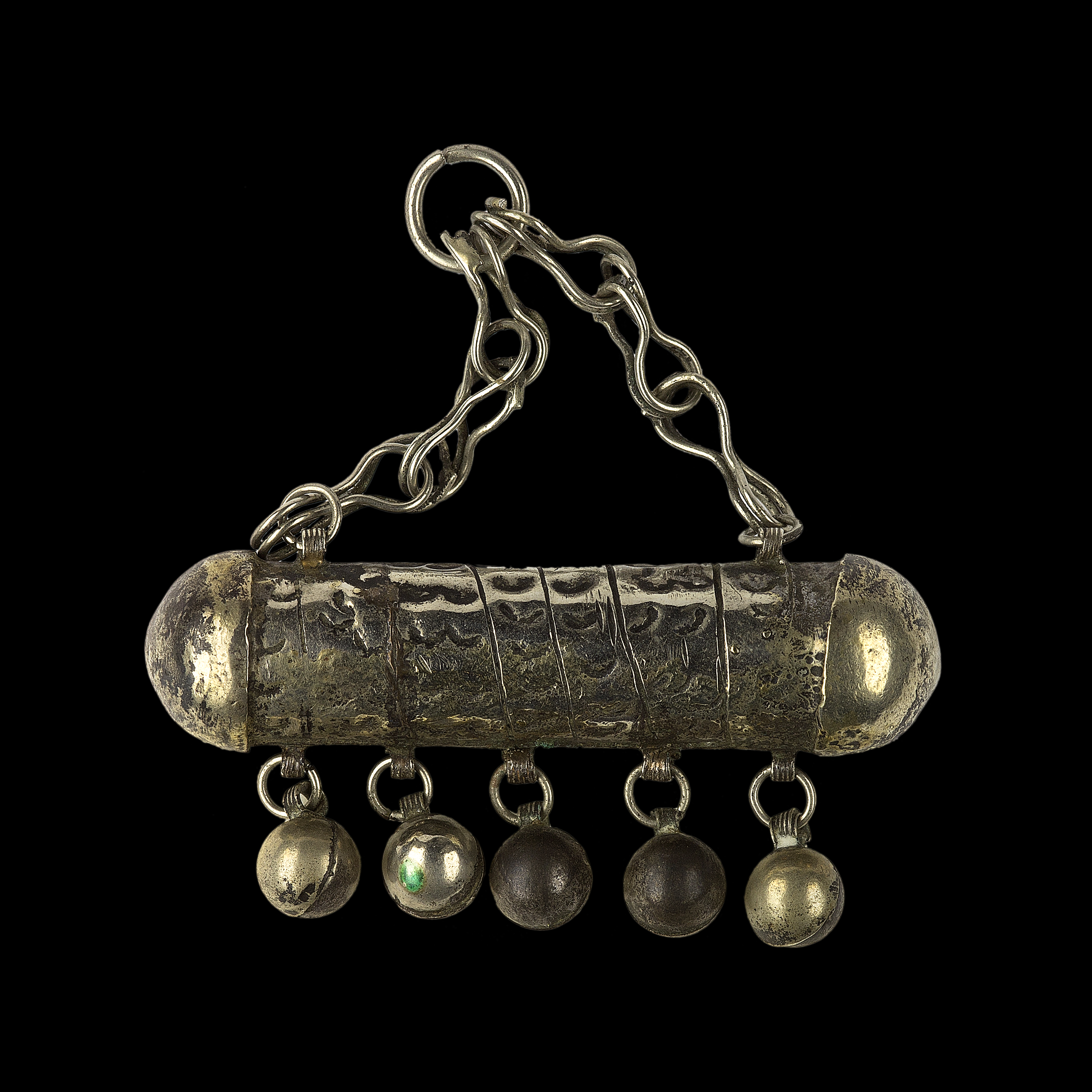
Silver pendant with engraved Quran-box

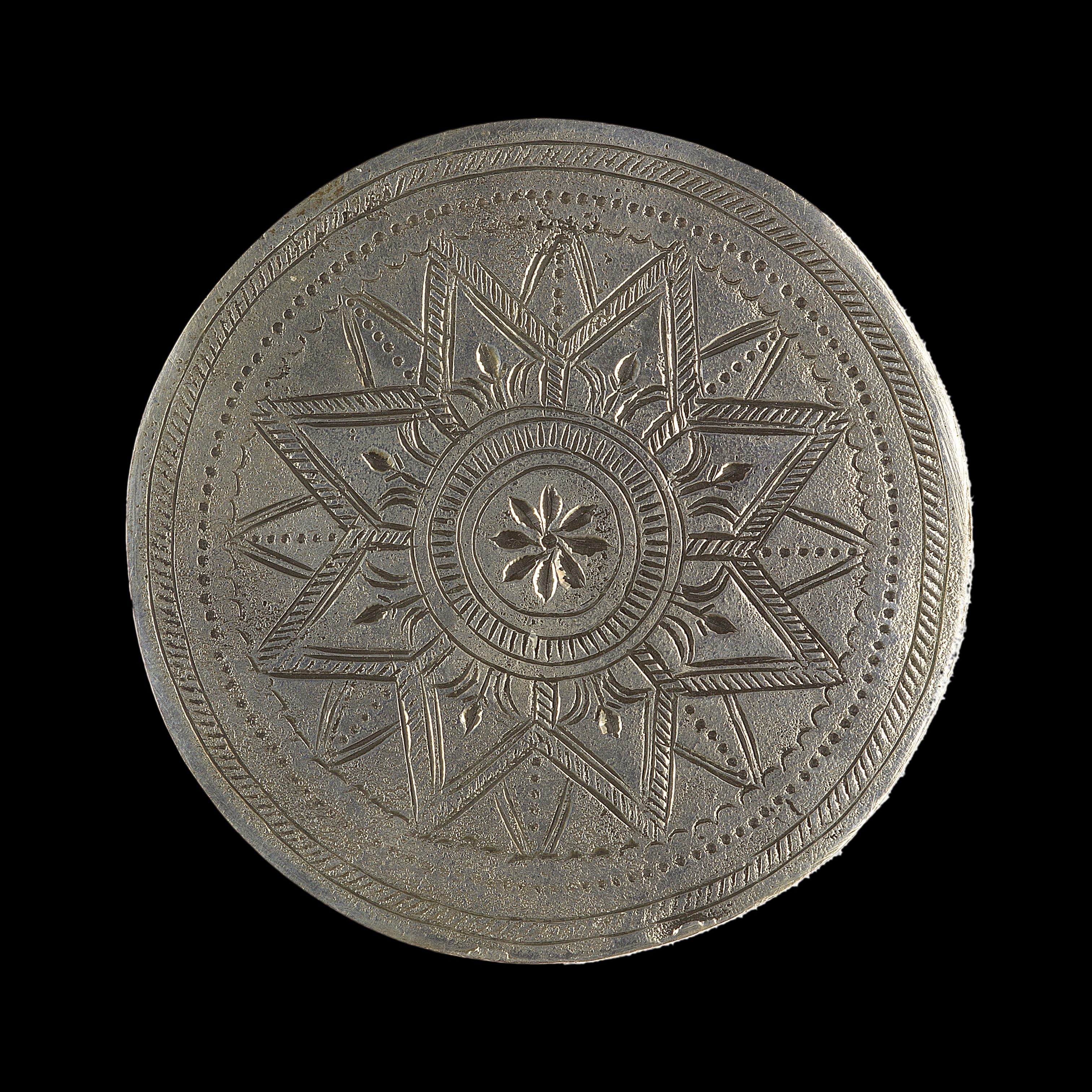
Silver ring

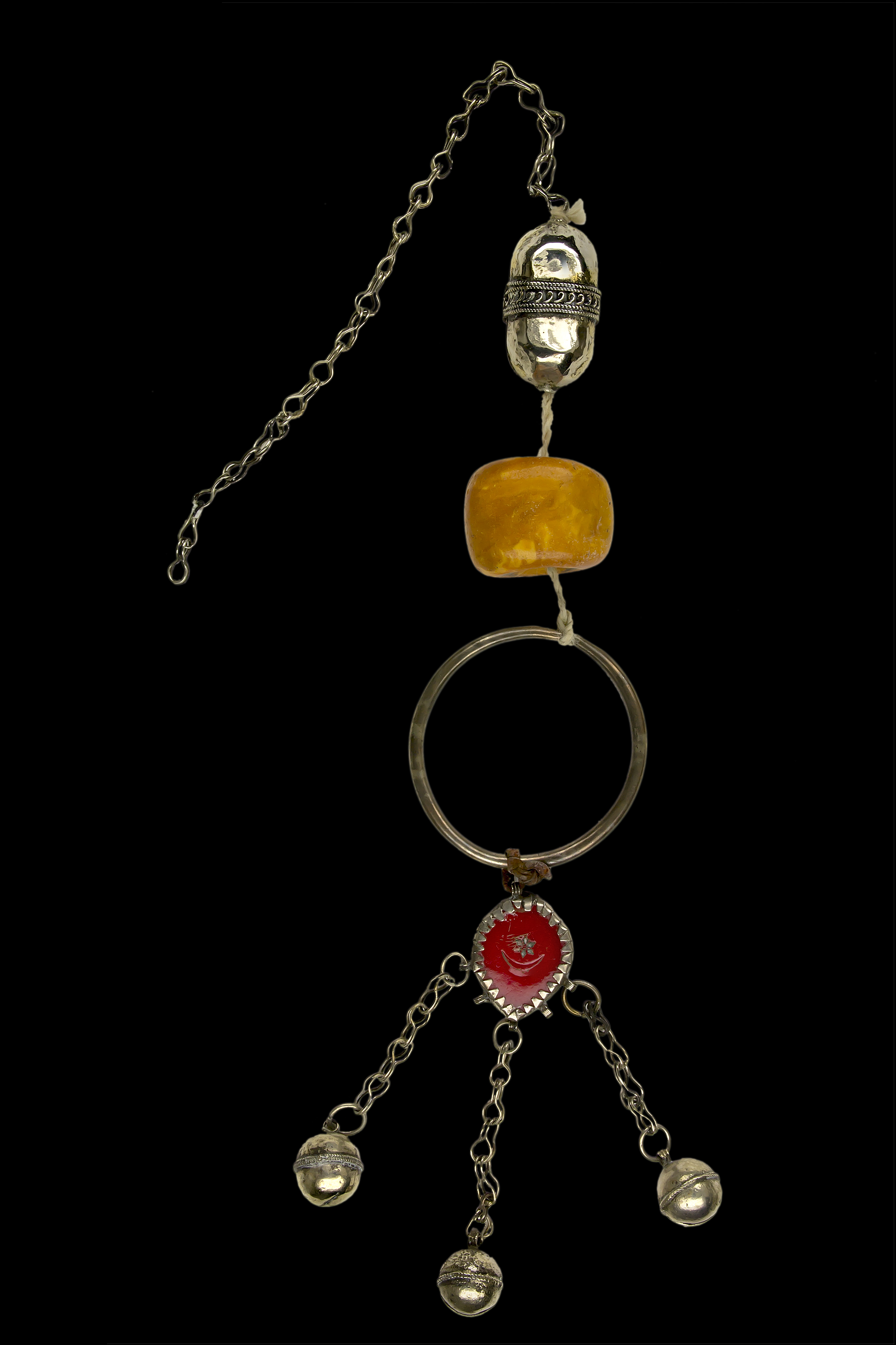
Silver ear ornament

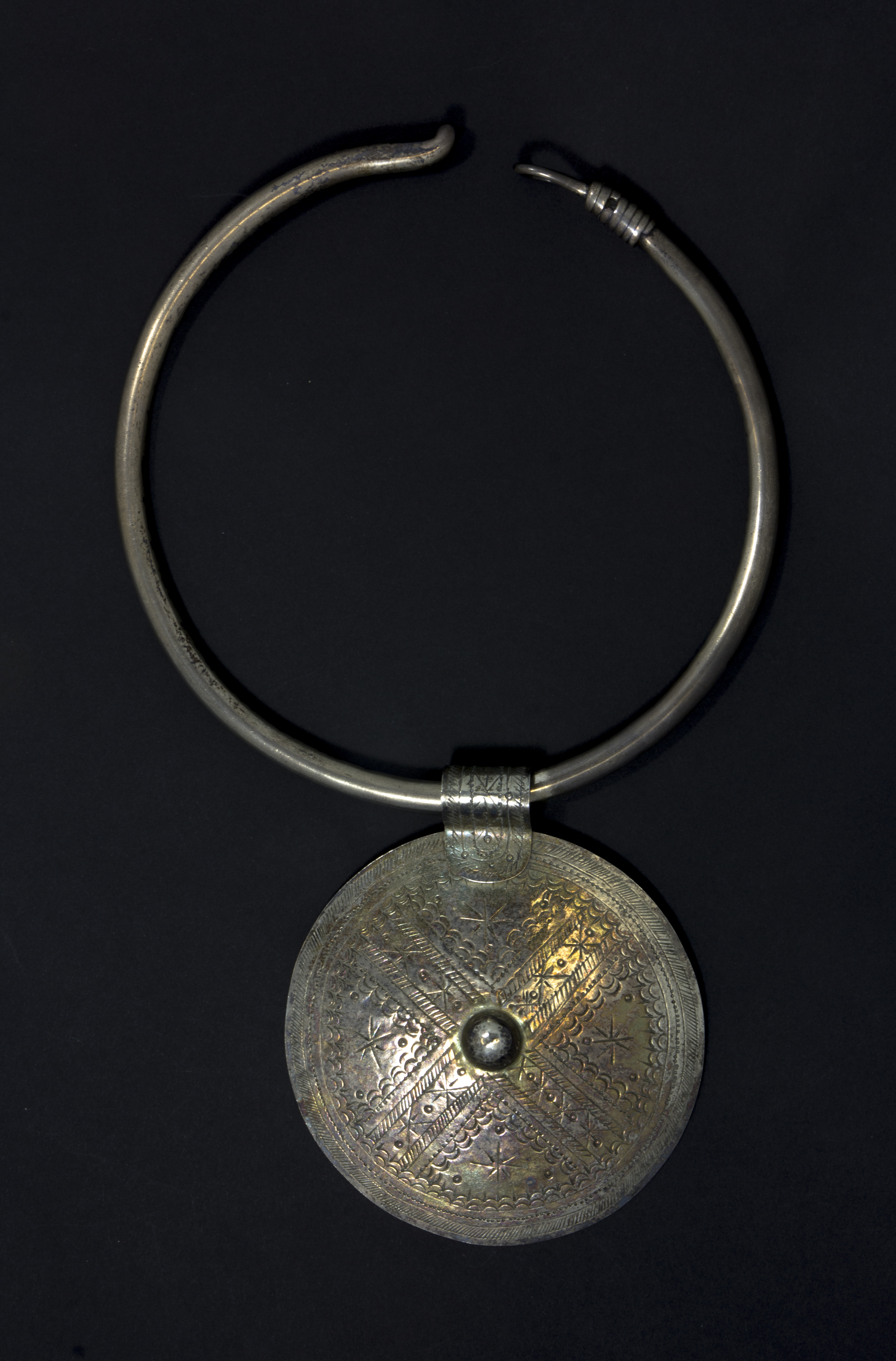
Silver disk and round necklace (torc)

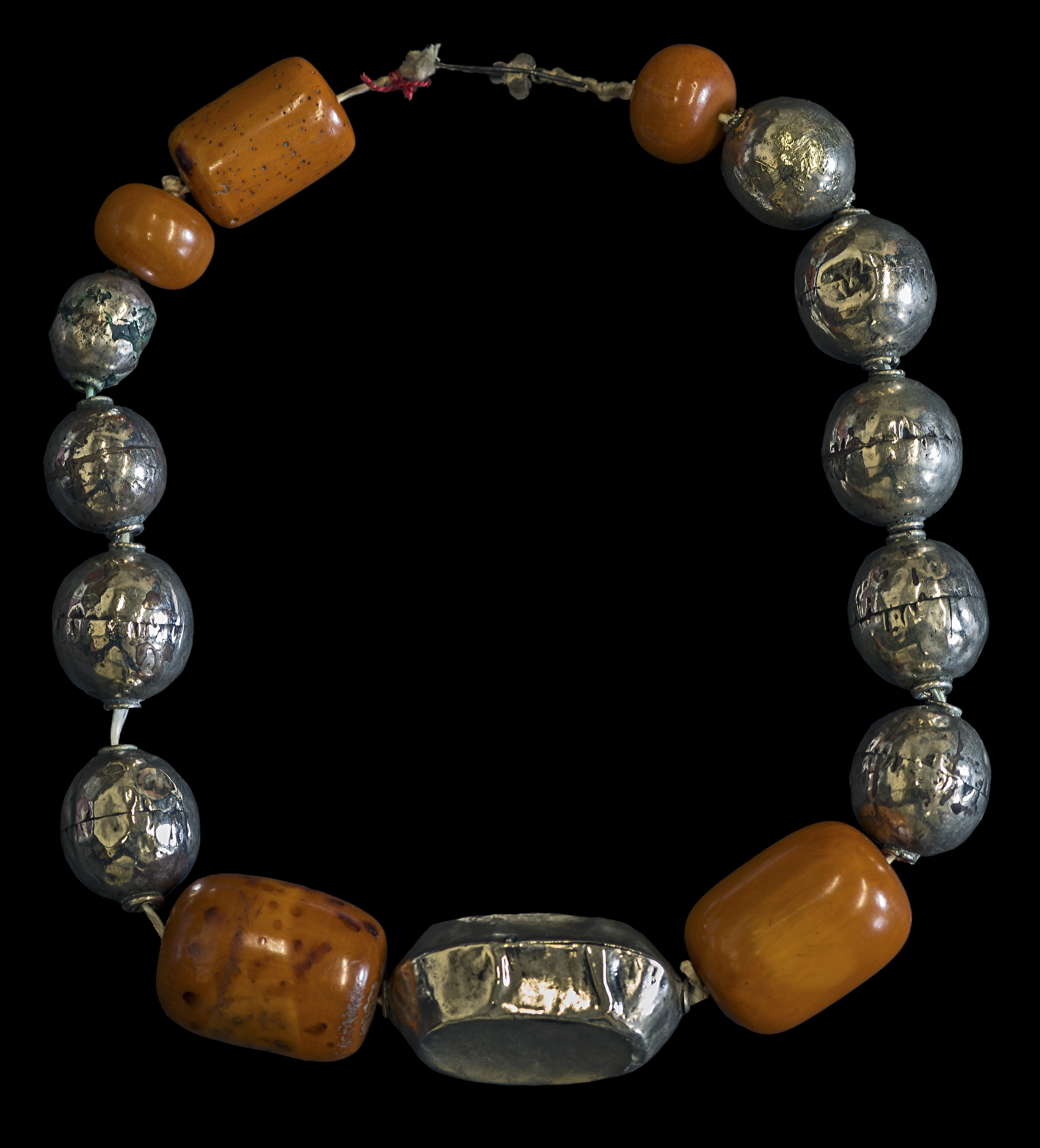
Amber and silver necklace

=== Festivals ===
Siwi people are very religious, so on Ramadan, they tend to close all the shops and stay at home for the whole month. Like other Muslim Egyptians, Siwis celebrate Eid al-Fitr (lʕid ahakkik,"the Little Eid") and Eid al-Adha (lʕid azuwwar,"the Big Eid"). Unlike other Egyptians on Eid al-Adha, however, Siwis cook the skin of the sheep (along with its innards) as a festival delicacy, after removing the hair. They also eat heart of palm (agroz).

The Siyaha Festival (Eid El Solh–Eid El Hasad), in honour of the town's traditional patron saint Sidi Sulayman, is unique to Siwa (the name is often misunderstood as a reference to "tourism", but in fact predates tourism). It is known that on this occasion Siwi men meet on a mountain near the town, Gabal Al-Dakrour, to eat together, sing chants while thanking God, and reconcile with one another; all Siwi houses co-operate in preparing and cooking food, in this day Siwian people eat fattah (rice, toasted bread and meat), after Dohr prayer (12:00 PM) all Siwian youth gather to set the banquet, nobody is allowed to eat before the caller announces to start eating so they can all eat together, the women stay behind in the village, and celebrate with dancing, singing, and drums. The food for the festival is bought collectively, with funds gathered by the oasis' mosques, celebrations last for 3 Qamari days, and in the early morning of the fourth day, siwian men form a big march, while holding flags and singing spiritual songs. The march starts from Gabal El-Dakrour and ends in Sidi Solayman square – in the center of Siwa – declaring ending of festivals, and beginning of a new year without hatred or grudge, and with love, respect and reconciliation.

Siwi children traditionally also celebrated Ashura by lighting torches, singing, and exchanging sweets. Adults' celebration was limited to the preparation of a large meal.

=== Relations with the Bedouins ===
Siwans are preferentially endogamous, only rarely marrying non-Siwans. Nonetheless, Bedouin brides command a higher brideprice in Siwa than Siwan ones.

According to older members of the Awlad Ali Bedouins, the Bedouin relations with Siwans were traditionally mediated through a system of "friendship", whereby a specific Siwan (and his descendants) would be the friend of a specific Bedouin (and his descendants). The Bedouin would stay at the Siwan's house when he came to Siwa, and would exchange his animal products and grain for the Siwan's dates and olive oil.

Siwa's Berbers are close to 30,000 in number.

The hot springs are an attraction to visitors.

=== Role of women ===
Women have traditionally played a prominent role in Siwan households, often being in charge of a household's financial decisions. They have also been responsible for raising children; the town's deputy mayor said in 1985, "If our children speak Siwi, it is to our womenfolk that they owe it."

=== Siwan pederastic tradition ===
Siwa is of special interest to anthropologists and sociologists because of its historical acceptance of intergenerational male homosexuality and rituals celebrating same-sex marriage – traditions that the Egyptian authorities have sought to repress, with increasing success, since the early 20th century.

The German Egyptologist Georg Steindorff explored the oasis in 1900 and reported that pederastic relations were common and often extended to a form of marriage: "The feast of marrying a boy was celebrated with great pomp, and the money paid for a boy sometimes amounted to fifteen pounds, while the money paid for a woman was a little over one pound." Mahmud Mohammad Abd Allah, writing of Siwan customs for the Harvard Peabody Museum in 1917, commented that although Siwan men could take up to four wives, "Siwan customs allow a man but one boy to whom he is bound by a stringent code of obligations."

In 1937, anthropologist Walter Cline wrote the first detailed ethnography of the Siwans in which he noted: "All normal Siwan men and boys practice sodomy...among themselves the natives are not ashamed of this; they talk about it as openly as they talk about love of women, and many if not most of their fights arise from homosexual competition....Prominent men lend their sons to each other. All Siwans know the matings which have taken place among their sheiks and their sheiks' sons....Most of the boys used in sodomy are between 12 and 18 years of age." After an expedition to Siwa, the archaeologist Count Byron de Prorok reported in 1937 "an enthusiasm [that] could not have been approached even in Sodom... Homosexuality was not merely rampant, it was raging...Every dancer had his boyfriend...[and] chiefs had harems of boys".

In the late 1940s, a Siwan merchant told the visiting British novelist Robin Maugham that the Siwan women were "badly neglected", but that Siwan men "will kill each other for boy. Never for a woman", although as Maugham noted, marriage to a boy had become illegal by then. The Egyptian egyptologist Ahmed Fakhry, who studied Siwa for three decades, observed in 1973 that "While the Siwans were still living inside their walled town, none of these bachelors was allowed to spend the night in the town and had to sleep outside the gates...Under such circumstances it is not surprising that homosexuality was common among them....Up to the year 1928, it was not unusual that some kind of written agreement, which was sometimes called a marriage contract, was made between two males; but since the visit of King Fu'ad to this oasis it has been completely forbidden...However, such agreements continued, but in great secrecy, and without the actual writing, until the end of World War II. Now the practice is not followed."

Despite the multiplicity of sources for these practices, Egyptian authorities and even Siwan tribal elders have attempted to repress the historical and anthropological record. When the Siwa-born anthropologist Fathi Malim included reference to Siwan homosexuality (especially a love poem from a man to a youth) in his book Oasis Siwa (2001), the tribal council demanded that he blank out the material in the current edition of the book and remove it from future editions, or be expelled from the community. Malim reluctantly agreed and physically deleted the passages in the first edition of his book, and excluded them from the second. A newer book, Siwa Past and Present (2005) by A. Dumairy, the Director of Siwa Antiquities, omits all mention of the famous historical practices of the inhabitants.

== People ==
About 80 km (50 mi) in length and 20 km (12 mi) wide, Siwa Oasis is one of Egypt's most isolated settlements, with about 25,000 people, mostly Siwi Berbers (Siwi: Isiwan). The municipality hosts the easternmost Berber-speaking community, whose language, called Siwi (Jlan n Isiwan), shares many linguistic features with the languages of Sokna and El Foqaha in Libya, partially also with the Zenati group, and which has been heavily influenced by Arabic.

While the majority of the population of Siwa is Berber, the oasis is also home to a Bedouin community related to the Awlad Ali, the Shahibaat, as well as to a growing number of other Egyptian settlers. Currently, the entire population of the oasis speaks Arabic as either a first or a second language. The Siwi Berber population is also fluent in Egyptian Arabic, which is called Masri "Egyptian".

== Economy ==
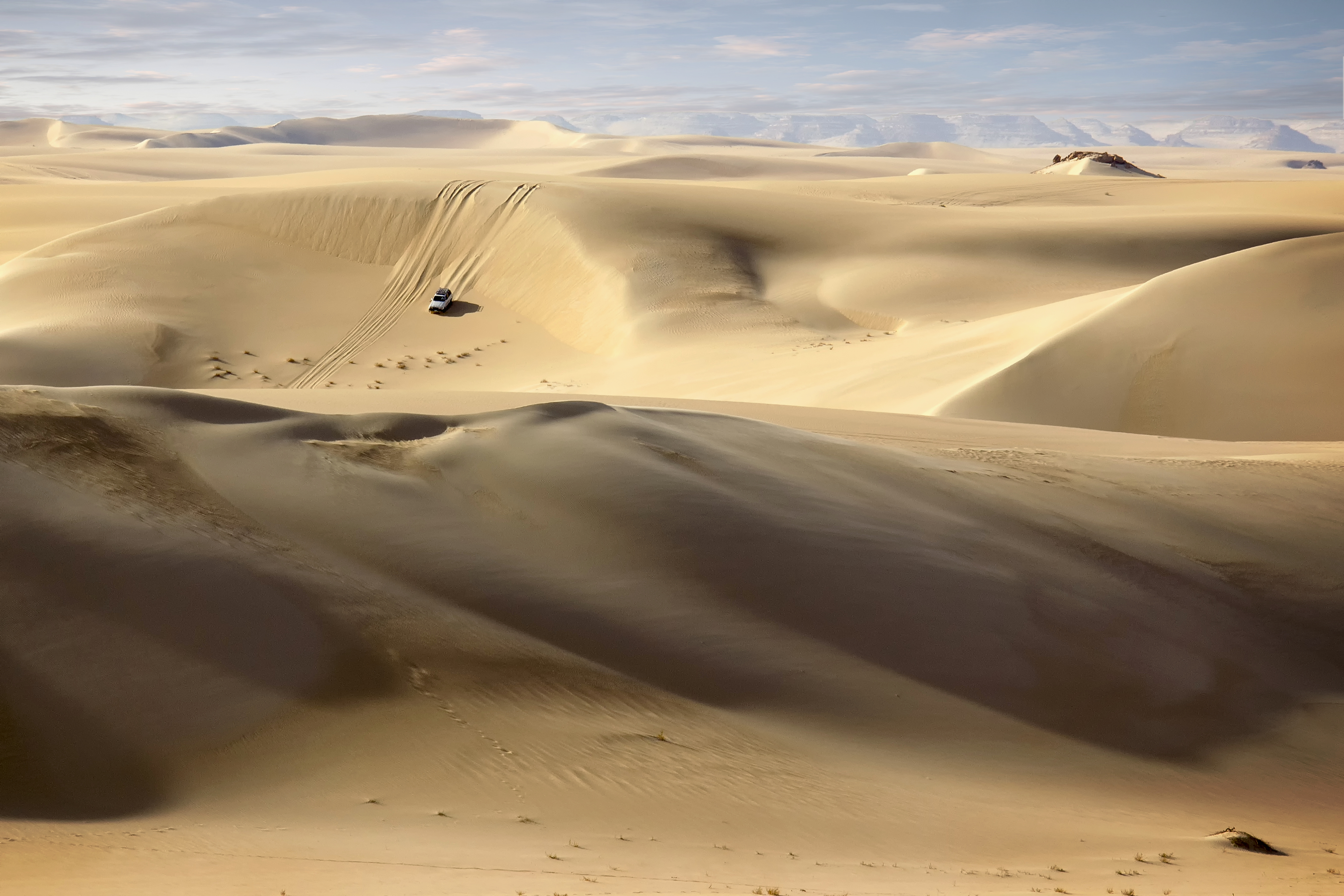
Off-roading in the dunes of Siwa

Siwa has been noted for its dates since ancient times, and today date palm cultivation is by far the largest component of its economy. In a distant second place, with about one-fifth of the scale as dates, is olive cultivation. Handicrafts like basketry are also of regional importance.

Tourism has in recent decades become a vital source of income. Much attention has been given to creating hotels that use local materials and display local styles.

== Archaeology ==
In the mid-20th century, Egyptian archaeologist Ahmed Fakhry worked at Siwa (and elsewhere in the Western Desert).

In 1995, Greek archaeologist Liana Souvaltzi announced that she had identified the tomb of Alexander the Great in the oasis of Siwa. She made the following statement to the Greek media:

But I am speaking to every Greek all over the world. I want every one of you to feel proud because Greek hands have found this very important monument.

This statement was an answer to the, at the time, Greek Prime Minister Costas Simitis who urged the archaeologists to stop their research in Egypt and sent a Greek Embassy advisor to ask the Egyptian government to withdraw Mrs Souvaltzi’s permission to excavate in the area. This case is still active in the Greek courts of law.

An extremely old hominid footprint was discovered in 2007 at Siwa Oasis. Egyptian scientists claimed it could be 2–3 million years old, which would make it the oldest fossilized hominid footprint ever found. However, no proof of this conjecture was ever presented.

In late 2013, an announcement was made regarding the apparent archaeoastronomy discovery of precise spring and fall equinox sunrise alignments over the Aghurmi mound/Amun Oracle when viewed from Timasirayn temple in the Western Desert, 12 km away across Lake Siwa. The first known recent public viewing of this event occurred on March 21, 2014, during the spring equinox.

== In popular culture ==
Siwa Oasis is an official map for Wolfenstein: Enemy Territory which belongs to the North Africa Campaign. The fifth mission from the game Sniper Elite III takes place on the Siwa Oasis. Siwa is prominently featured in the videogame Assassin's Creed: Origins and is the birthplace and home of the protagonist Bayek of Siwa. In British author Anthony Horowitz's Alex Rider series, the ninth and eleventh instalments Scorpia Rising and Never Say Die feature Siwa. In Australian author Matthew Reilly's Jack West series of seven novels starting with Seven Ancient Wonders feature prominently the Oracle of Siwa.

== Bibliogrophy ==
- Fakhry, Ahmed (1944). Siwa Oasis: Its History and Antiquities. Cairo: Government Press.
- Fakhry, Ahmed (1973). Siwa Oasis. Cairo: American University in Cairo Press.
- Hassan, Fekri A. (1976). "Prehistoric Studies of the Siwa Oasis Region: Preliminary Report, 1975 Season". Nyame Akuma, 9, pp. 18–34.
- Hassan, Fekri A. (1978). "Archaeological Explorations of the Siwa Oasis Region, Egypt". Current Anthropology, 19, pp. 146–148.
- Jackson, Robert B. (2002). "Siwa Oasis". In At Empire's Edge: Exploring Rome's Egyptian Frontier, pp. 241–260. New Haven: Yale University Press.
- Serreli, Valentina, and Valentina Schiattarella (2021). "Siwa Oasis". Oxford Bibliographies in African Studies. Oxford University Press.
- Cziesla, Erwin, and Rudolph Kuper (1992). Qattara/Siwa: Ost-West-Beziehungen in der nördlichen Libyschen Wüste. Cologne: Afrikaforschung an der Universität zu Köln.
- Aldumairy, A. El-Aziz (2000). Siwa: Past and Present.

== See also ==
- List of cities and towns in Egypt
