= Ahmed Fakhry =

Egyptian Egyptologist (1905–1973)

- Born: 1905; Faiyue Governorate, Egypt
- Died: 1973 7th, June; Paris, France
- Known for: Excavations in the Western Desert, Siwa Oasis, El Haiz, and Dahshur necropolis
- Scientific career
- Fields: Egyptology, Archaeology
- Institutions: Egyptian Department of Antiquities

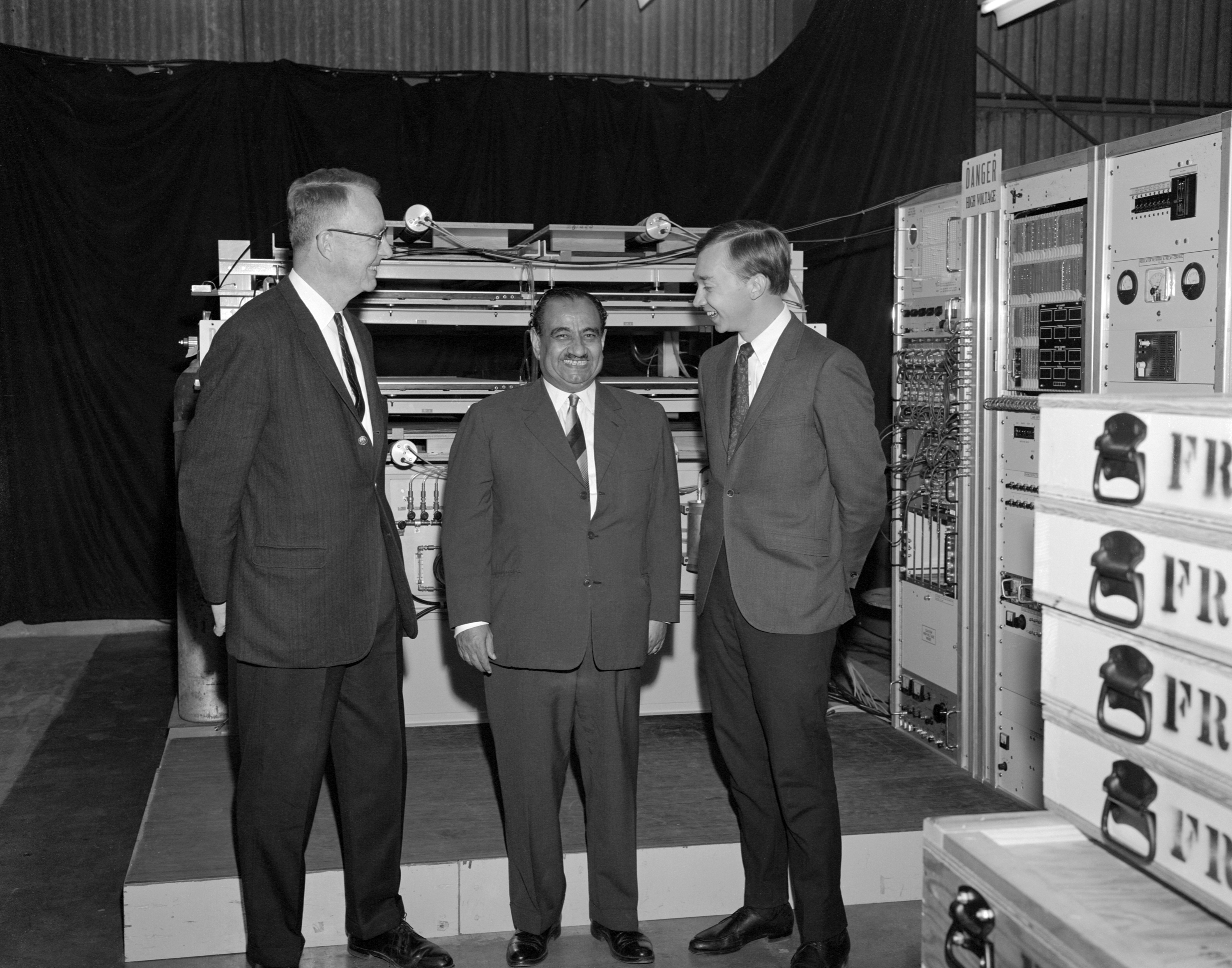
Luis Walter Alvarez, Ahmed Fakhry and Jerry Anderson

Ahmed Fakhry (Arabic: أحمد فخري) (born in Faiyum Governorate in 1905 – Paris, 7 June 1973) was an Egyptian archaeologist who worked in the Western desert of Egypt (including in 1940 dig at El Haiz, and then at Siwa), and also in the necropolis at Dahshur.

The exhibition of archival material traces key stages of his life and presents Egypt as seen through the eyes of Ahmed Fakhry, using his photographs, notes, and sketches. He conducted an excavation at Deir el-Haga in the Dakhla Oasis, Egypt

== Bibliography ==
- Siwa Oasis, Cairo, Egypt, American University in Cairo Press 1990
- Bahriyah and Farafra, Cairo, American University in Cairo Press 2003
- An archaeological journey to Yemen, (March–May, 1947)
- Bahria Oasis
- The Bent pyramid of Dahshûr / by Ahmed Fakhry; with papers by Hasan Mostafa and Herbert Ricke
- Intiṣār al-ḥaḍārah : tārīkh al-Sharq al-qadīm / bi-qalam Zhayms Hanrī Baristid; naqalahu ilá al-ʻArabīyah Aḥmad Fakhrī
- The Inscriptions of the Amethyst Quarries at Wadi el Hudi
- The monuments of Sneferu at Dahshur
- The Oases of Egypt
- The Oasis of Siwa its customs, history and monuments
- Sept tombeaux a l'est de la Grande Pyramide de Guizeh
