= World Archery Africa =

African governing body for archery as a sport

- Abbreviation: WAAf
- Formation: 28 September 1995; 30 years ago as Federation of African Archery (FAA)
- Type: Sports organisation
- Headquarters: Principal: Khartoum, Sudan; Annex: Giza, Egypt
- Region served: Africa
- Members: 33
- Secretary General: (Egypt) Ahmed Koura
- President: (Sudan) Ahmed Tarik Amiry
- Parent organization: World Archery
- Website: waafrica.org

World Archery Africa (WAAf), formerly the Federation of African Archery is the continental governing body for the sport of archery on the African Continent and is recognized by a number of international bodies, including the World Archery Federation (WAF) and the Association of National Olympic Committees of Africa (ANOCA). WAAf is responsible for regulating and promoting archery across the African continent, covering all levels of the sport from grassroots to elite performance. World Archery Africa comprises four zones (East, West, North, and South) with 33 member associations that regulate, promote, and develop the sport in their respective countries and regions.

== History ==
It was founded in 28 septembre 1995 in Harare, Zimbabwe as the Federation of African Archery (FAA). The founding members included South Africa, Zimbabwe, Zambia, Tanzania, and Kenya. The name was changed during the 2013 Congress of the WAF.

== Member associations ==
- Algeria
- Benin
- Cameroon
- Central African Republic
- Chad
- Comoros
- Côte d'Ivoire
- DR Congo
- Egypt
- Eritrea
- Gabon
- Ghana
- Guinea
- Kenya
- Libya
- Malawi
- Mauritania
- Mauritius
- Morocco
- Namibia
- Niger
- Nigeria
- Poland
- Rwanda
- Senegal
- Sierra Leone
- Somalia
- South Africa
- Sudan
- Togo
- Tunisia
- Uganda
- Zimbabwe

== Competitions ==
- African Archery Championships
- African Archery Championships for U21 (since 2026)
- African Archery Championships for U18 (since 2026)
- African Games (2019)
