= Shilha =

Shilha (from Colloquial Arabic Šəlḥa) is a term used to refer to a number of Berber languages spoken across northern Africa. In international usage, it most commonly refers to Tashelhiyt (Tašlḥiyt), the language of the Išlḥiyn of southwestern Morocco. Other Berber varieties to which it refers include:

- Ghomara
- Blidean Atlas Tamazight
- Central Atlas Tamazight
- Senhaja de Srair language
- South Oran Berber (various ksour in southwestern Algeria and southeastern Morocco)
- Oued Righ Berber (around Touggourt)
- Tunisian Berber in general: Djerbi, Matmata (Tamezret), Douiri.

It is also used locally to refer to a non-Berber language of the region: Korandje in Tabelbala.
