= Eastern Morocco Zenati =

Berber dialects spoken in Morocco

- Native to: Morocco
- Region: Oriental
- Language family: Afro-Asiatic: Berber; Northern Berber; Zenati; Eastern Morocco Zenati
- Writing system: Tifinagh, Arabic, Latin

Language codes
- ISO 639-3: None (mis)
- Glottolog: None
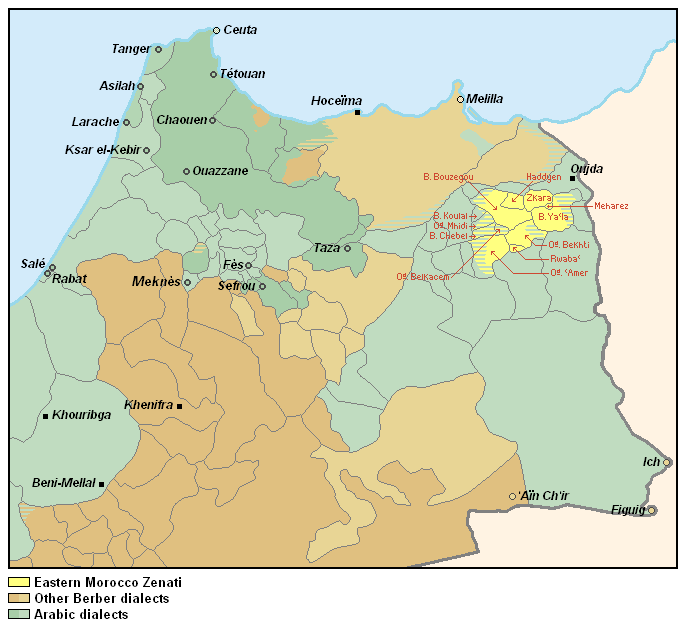

Eastern Morocco Zenati dialects are a group of Berber dialects spoken in Morocco from Jerada Province to Berkane Province.

They belong to the Zenati dialectal group and are closely related to the main Riffian dialects, as well as to the Ait Snous dialect, spoken beside the border in Algeria.

Eastern Morocco Zenati is spoken among the Berber tribes of Beni Bouzegou, Haddiyin (Big Beni Bouzegou subtribe), Mgeder, Beni Ya'la, Zkara, Bekhata, Meharez, At Iznasen, and Rwaba'.

Formerly, these dialects were also spoken in the area between Debdou and Taourirt (to the west of their current speaking area) by the tribes of Beni Koulal, Oulad Mahdi and Beni Chebel; these tribes are currently mainly Arabic-speakers.
