= East Zenati languages =

Family of Amazigh (Berber) languages

East Zenati
- Zuwara–Sened
- Geographic distribution: North Africa
- Linguistic classification: Afro-Asiatic: Berber; Northern; Zenati; East Zenati
- Subdivisions: Sened †; Matmata; Douiret; Jerba; Zuwara; Nafusi

Language codes
- Glottolog: zuar1239 Zuwara–Sened
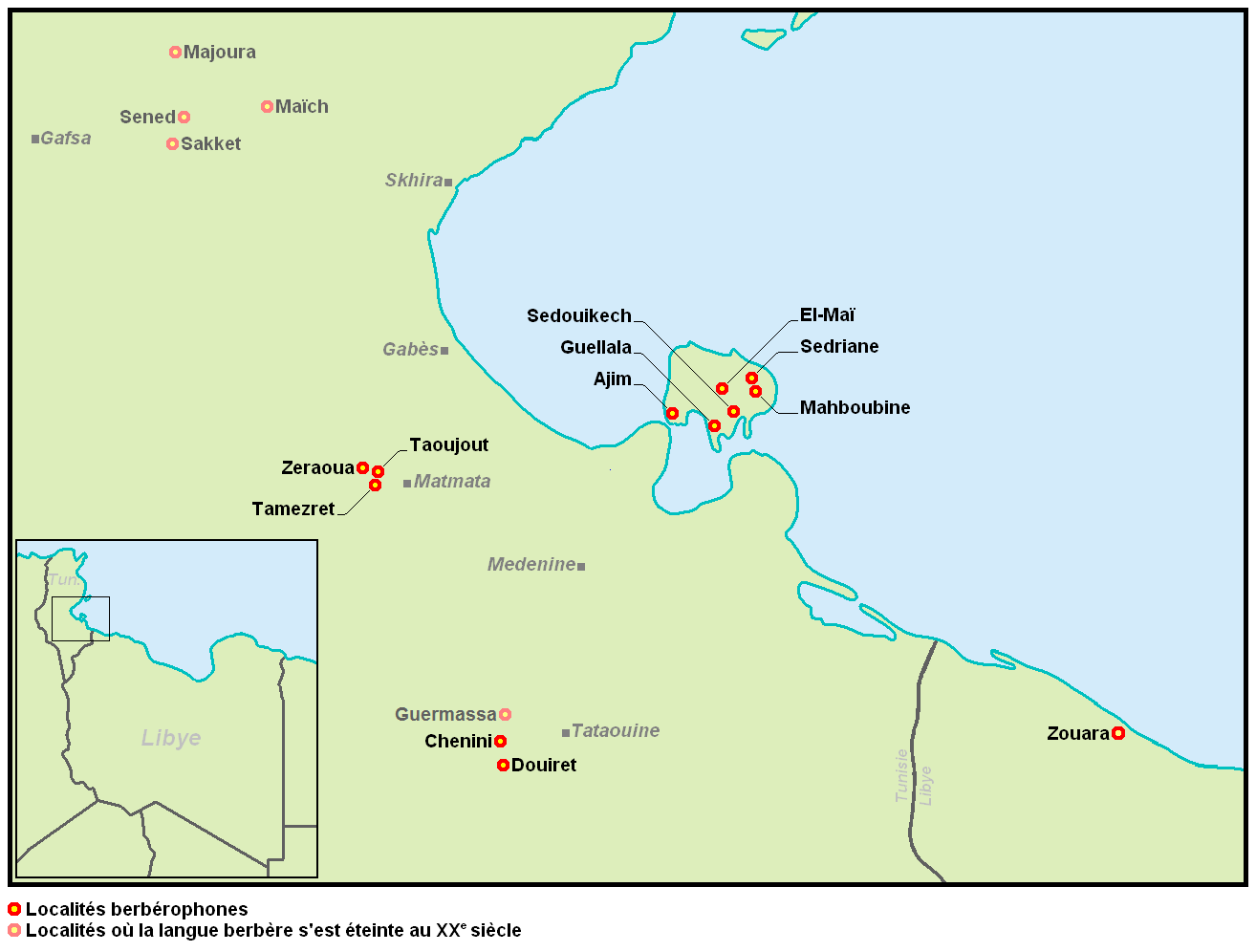
- Berber-speaking areas belonging to Kossmann's "Tunisian-Zuwara" dialectal group

The East Zenati languages (Blench, 2006) or Tunisian and Zuwara (Kossmann, 2013) are a group of the Zenati languages spoken in Tunisia and Libya.

Maarten Kossmann considers the easternmost varieties of Zenati dialects as transitional to Eastern Berber, but they are quite different from the neighboring Nafusi.

According to Kossmann, the dialect cluster of Tunisian Berber and Zuwara is consisting of the varieties spoken in mainland Tunisia (Sened (extinct), Matmata and Douiret), Jerba and Zuwara, but not Nafusi which is considered a dialect of Eastern Berber.

Before Kossmann, Roger Blench (2006) considered East Zanati to be a dialect cluster consisting of Sened (extinct, including Tmagurt), Djerbi, Matmata (Tamezret, Zrawa & Taujjut), and Nafusi.
