= Zuwara Berber =

East Zenati Berber language

Zuwara
- Maziɣ
- Native to: Libya
- Region: Zuwara
- Language family: Afro-Asiatic: Berber; Northern; Zenati; East Zenati; Zuwara

Language codes
- ISO 639-3: None (mis)
- Glottolog: tuni1262
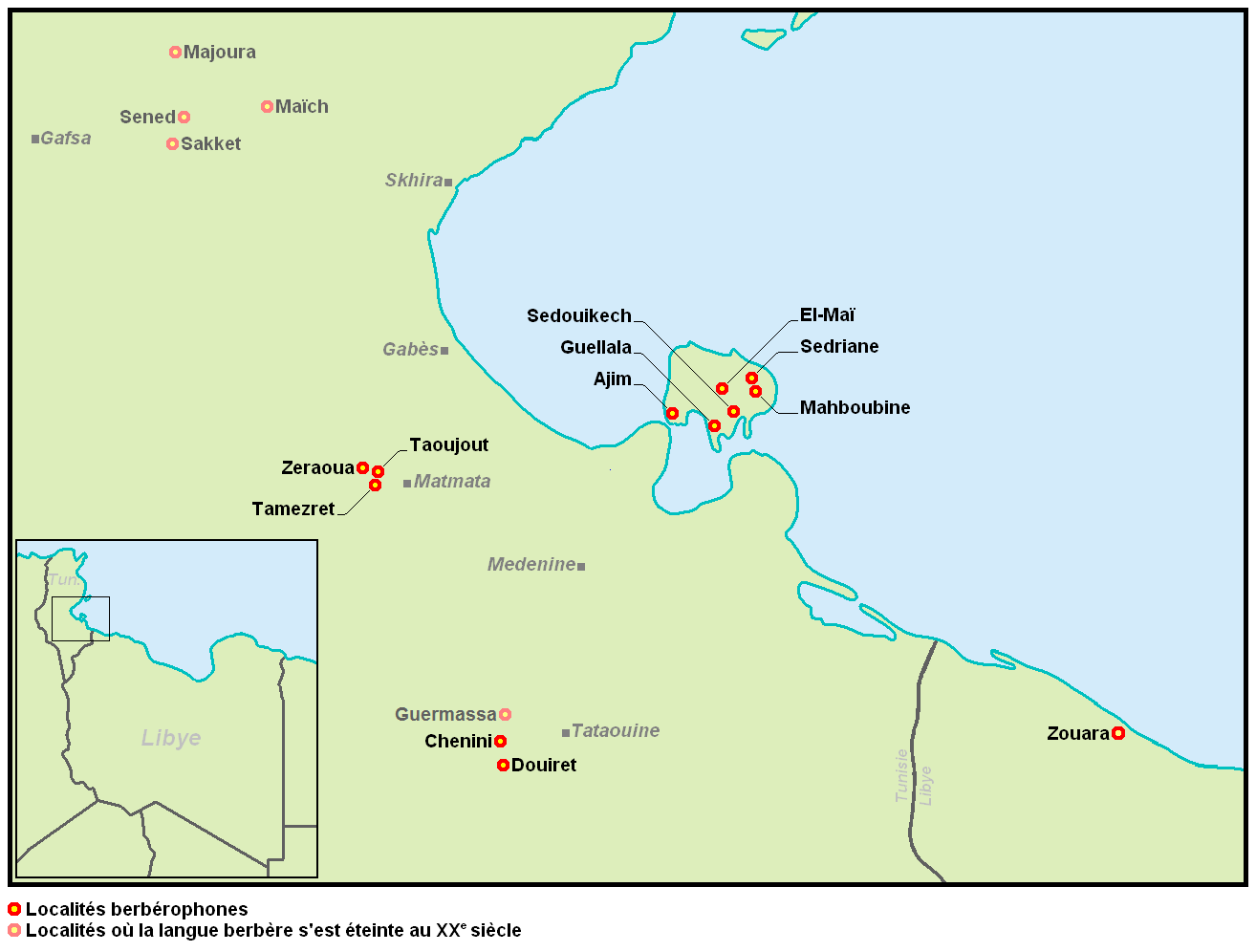
- Berber-speaking areas belonging to Kossmann's "Tunisian-Zuwara" dialectal group

Zuwara Berber (also: Zuara, Zwara; endonym: Maziɣ) is a Berber language, one of the East Zenati languages. It is spoken in Zuwara city, located on the coast of western Tripolitania in northwestern Libya.

Several works of Terence Mitchell, most notably Zuaran Berber (Libya): Grammar and texts, provide an overview of the language's grammar along with a set of texts, based mainly on the speech of his consultant Ramadan Azzabi. Some articles on this subject were also published by Luigi Serra.

The speakers refer to their language as Maziɣ. Unusually for Berber, the masculine form is used to refer to the language.

Ethnologue considers this language a dialect of Nafusi, although the two belong to different branches of Berber according to Kossmann (1999).

== Number of Speakers ==
By some estimates, 297,000 people speak Zuwara Berber or a similar dialect. Approximately 247,000 of these speakers reside in Libya.

== Writing System ==
This language uses the Naskh variant of the Arabic script.

== Phonology ==
Zuwara Berber has many consonants compared to vowels. However, words can end in both consonants and vowels. For instance, the Latinized words "ˈa.man" and "ˈa.nu" mean "water" and "water well" in English, respectively.

=== Consonants ===
Zuwara Berber has a total of 31 consonants.

Consonants
		Labial		Alveolar		Post-alv./ Palatal	Velar	Uvular		Pharyngeal	Glottal
		plain	phar.	plain	phar.	Post-alv./ Palatal	Velar	plain	phar.	Pharyngeal	Glottal
Plosive	voiceless			t	tˁ		k	q			
Plosive	voiced	b		d	dˁ		g				
Nasal		m	mˁ	n	nˁ						
Fricative	voiceless	f		s	sˁ	ʃ		χ		ħ	
Fricative	voiced			z	zˁ	ʒ		ʁ	ʁˁ	ʕ	ɦ
Approximant		w				j					
Trill				r	rˁ						
Lateral				l	lˁ						

=== Vowels ===
Zuwara Berber has a total of four vowels: /i/, /u/, /ə/, and /a/.

	Front	Central	Back
Close	i		u
Mid		ə	
Open		a	

== Prosody ==
=== Stress ===
In roughly 85% of words, the stress goes on the penultimate syllable, especially for native Zuwara Berber words. For instance, the word "a.ˈzi.zaw" means "green" in English and has three syllables. Thus, the stress is on the second syllable, "ˈzi".
