= Eastern Middle Atlas Berber =

Berber dialect cluster of Morocco

- Tmazight, Tamazight
- Native to: Morocco
- Region: Central Morocco: Middle Atlas
- Native speakers: 150,000–200,000 (2013, est.)
- Language family: Afro-Asiatic: Berber; Northern Berber; Zenati; Eastern Middle Atlas Berber
- Dialects: Ait Seghrouchen; Ait Warayn etc.
- Writing system: Tifinagh, Arabic, Latin

Language codes
- ISO 639-3: None (mis)
- Glottolog: east2803
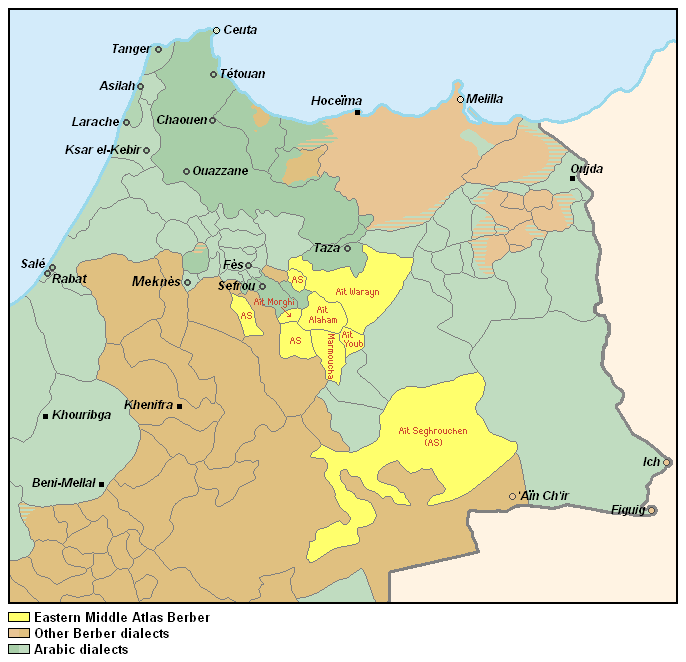
- Eastern Middle Atlas Berber

Eastern Middle Atlas Berber is a cluster of Berber dialects spoken in the eastern and north-eastern parts of the Middle Atlas, in Morocco. These dialects are those of the tribes of Ait Seghrouchen, Ait Warayn, Marmoucha, Ait Alaham, Ait Youb and Ait Mourghi.

Despite the fact that they are mutually intelligible with neighbouring Central Atlas Tamazight dialects and are generally classified among them, these dialects actually belong to the Zenati languages and are intermediate dialects between the Riffian and Atlas languages.

Among these Zenati dialects, those of Ait Seghrouchen and Ait Warayn were subject to most studies, while only a few studies were focused on the dialects of Ait Alaham and Marmoucha, and practically none focused on the dialects of Ait Youb and Ait Mourghi.
