= Djerba Berber =

Berber language of Tunisia

Djerba
- Shilha
- Native to: Tunisia
- Region: Djerba Island
- Native speakers: 55,000 (2021)
- Language family: Afro-Asiatic: Berber; Northern; Zenati; East; Djerba

Language codes
- ISO 639-3: jbn (included in Nafusi [jbn])
- Glottolog: jerb1241
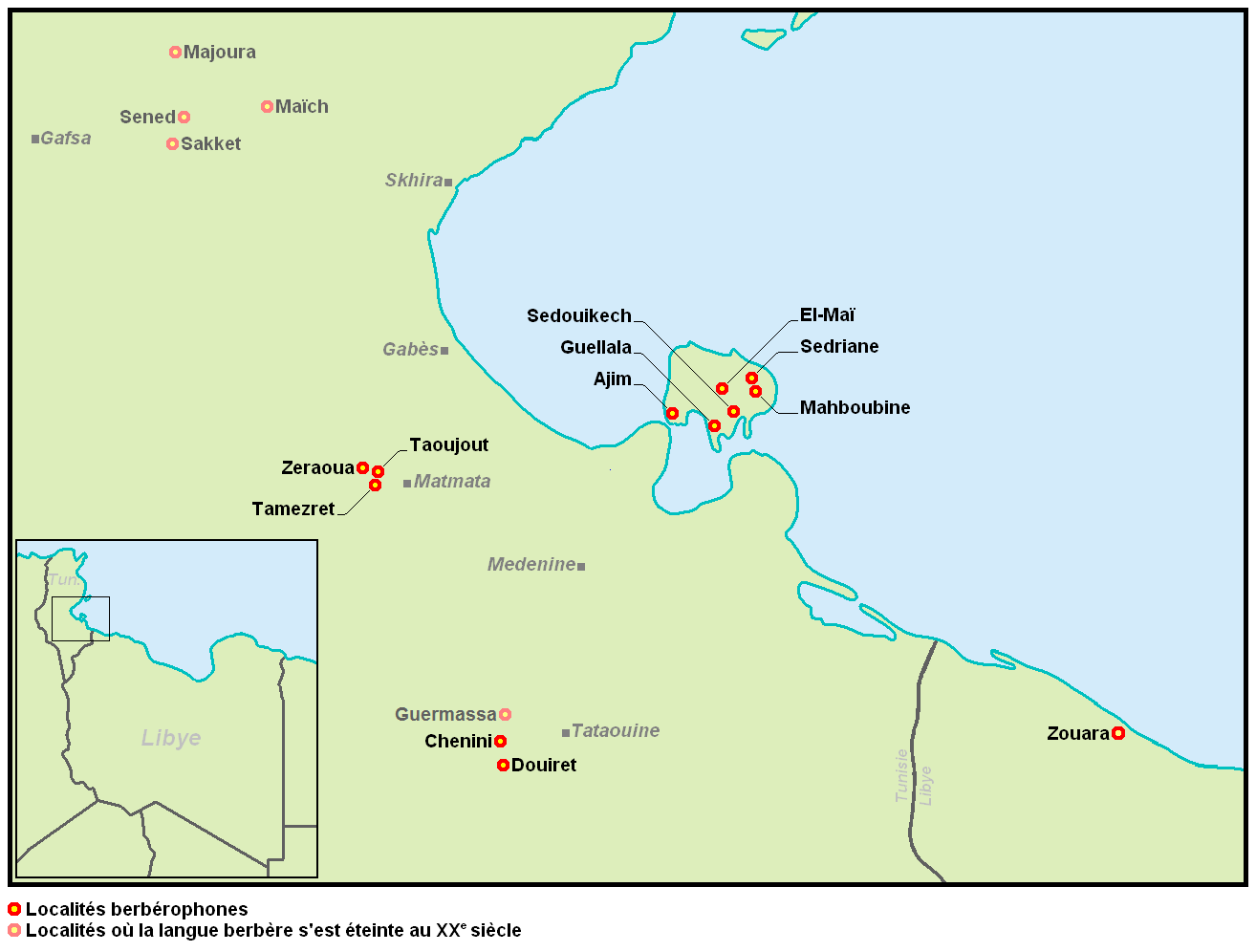
- Berber-speaking areas belonging to Kossmann's "Tunisian-Zuwara" dialectal group

Djerba Berber, Shilha of Djerba, Jerba Berber, Djerbi or Djerbian (in Berber: eddwi jjerbi or Tadjerbit) is a Berber language of the Eastern Maghreb, spoken on the island of Djerba, in Tunisia. It is a component of what is regularly denominated Tunisian "Shilha" or "Chelha" in the south of the country.

The Djerba Berber belongs to the group of Zenet languages of the East, to which also belong the other Berber dialects of Tunisia as well as that of the city of Zuwarah in Libya.

== Geographical distribution ==
At the end of the 19th century, Berber was apparently well established and spoken through the island. It was then possible to connect the dialect of Djerba to other Berber-speaking areas of Maghreb, and many orientalists like Adolphe de Calassanti Motilynski or René Basset (father of André Basset) were able to collect data, in particular tales and legends in vernacular. However, in the same time began the first significant statutory decline of Berber, in Djerba and more generally across the whole Maghreb. Different factors explain such a process, as the French sociolinguist Francis Manzano has pointed out. The reflection involves both French and Arabic. It also goes beyond Tunisia by suggesting a reflection on a North African scale.

On the one hand, French had reached rural populations more and more from the end of the 19th century, and the beginning of the 20th. This concerned men from Djerba, in contact with the bases of spoken French of the protectorate, in particular through commercial activities, an important activity of many Djerbians who emigrate through Tunisia and France, like "Kabyles" (Algeria) and "Chleuhs" (Morocco) migrants. At the same time, colonial education (although with shortcomings), combined with new administrative necessities, affected more and more efficiently the young people of the island. Conscription (increasingly important, with the two world wars that were to follow), also favored the growing learning of French by men. This language therefore began to play the role of a new koine as the colonial Maghreb depended heavily on metropolitan France and the whole French colonial empire.

In the 19th century, the influence of dialectal Arabic was limited to geographic sectors of contact between rural Berber areas and more urban areas, with an Arabic-speaking growing population. It is, paradoxically, colonization in Algeria (or the French protectorates in Morocco and Tunisia) which allowed the Arabic language to benefit from new channels of diffusion and penetration within the Berber continuum. In addition, Arab was an estimated written language (notably in religious and administrative matters), and this favored its dissemination. The anti-colonial struggle indeed required the use of a written language opposable to French, something impossible for Berber in this period. Of course, the fact that Arabic is closely associated with Islam was a factor of progress, as it made Arabic the main language of the identity response among regional elites. All these facts, accumulated and amplified, could therefore only weaken the Berber language and prepare the current sociolinguistic landscape. From this complex process Djerba Berber came to be variably spoken during the 20th century in seven main localities of the south and east of the island: El May, Cedriane (or Sedriyan), Mahboubine, Sedouikech, Ajim (or Adjim) and Guellala, with strong decline during the second part of the century, in most of these villages (see below the study of Francis Manzano). The main exception was Guellala where some studies and reviews mentioned regularly a clear reservoir

Recent information on Berber dialects in Tunisia and the current situation are imprecise. But we are better informed about the state and the realities of the Berber-speaking communities of the island during the first half of the 20th century, through the generalist works of René Stablo and those of the French dialectologist André Basset. At the end of the sixties, linguists and sociolinguists took up observations on the language practices of Berber of Tunisia and Djerba, while linguistics and sociolinguistics were actively spreading in Tunisia and more generally in Maghrib. The whole documentation highlights a declining language, little (or not at all) correlated with a positive collective consciousness of identity. It is, in most cases, a minority language, often stigmatized, and unprotected by the institutions or the general culture of the State.

== Linguistic characteristics ==
=== Geodiachronical aspects ===
Francis Manzano, on the basis of personal surveys and various previous works, carried out an analysis of the sociolinguistic landscape of the island at the beginning of the 1990s.

Most of the Berber speakers were found in the sectors of Guellala, Sedouikech, Srandi and Khenansa, in the centre and the south of the island. They were overwhelmingly bilingual (Arabic and Berber), trilingual (Arabic, French and Berber) and often more, as many of them were employed in the touristic area where they learned and speak usually English, German, Italian and many languages of the Mediterranean.

On the other hand, further north, there were no Berber speakers since the time of Stablo or Basset (Houmt Souk and Midoun), or it was very old people who could no longer find partners to express themselves in their mother tongue (Mahboubine). As a usual language of public space, Berber seemed to have already disappeared in El May and perhaps in Ajim, two areas where it was reported a few years earlier. In a synthetic cartography, the author showed how the decline of the Berber language seemed to have occurred since the work of Basset and those of Thomas Penchoen. The main Arabization started in the north of the island (1930-1940: Houmt Souk and Midoun) bypassed and isolated the centre / south of the island in the 1960s. Finally remained, in 1990, a hard core in the south, already centred on Guellala, Berber being often catalogued as the jargon of the potters of this locality.

=== Sociolinguistic aspects ===
This geographic decline is accompanied by a generational decline of Berber, regularly highlighted by informants. Most of them declare that the youngest know only fragments, some words and snatches, or ignore it completely. Tunisian school seems to be a major source of this decline, because it provides a real training in Arabic and French, which tends to cut young people off from their Berber environment.

Another heavy factor lies in the touristic activity, as Djerba is one of the most famous summer spots in the Mediterranean. This situation tends to devaluate Berber in the language exchanges and contacts, the more so as no Berber heritage cultural movement took shape in the 1990s. In this context, it was judged that learning English, German or Italian (or others languages of the hotels), with high economic and professional value, was surely better; so that Berber was essentially spoken by women and old people in the villages and their rural activities.

The religious factor is also important, in the Maghrebian context. Thus, an informant from the northeast of the island, questioned in 1990, about the Algerian Berber movement (at that time very virulent), could not understand the "refusal to speak Arabic, very astonishing and shocking among Muslims". He thus summarized a very "normal" opinion in the Tunisian sociolinguistic system, that of a logical replacement of Berber by Arabic.

Past studies, like the most recent ones, show that Djerba Berber is conceived as a language of intimacy, of the family, reserved or confined to collective memory, and promised to disappear. It is a language that has been dominated for a long time and which spontaneously retracted to escape the various sociolinguistic pressures mentioned.

=== Lexical and typological characteristics ===
The same survey allows us to establish that in a lexical sample of a hundred fundamental words declared "Berber" in Guellala, about three-quarters are effectively Berbers indeed, such as argaz ("man"), aɣrum ("bread") or anzar ("rain") [anẓaṛ], words clearly distinguished from their Arabic equivalents, and regularly presenting a typically Berber phonological structure, such as adu ("wind") [aḏu], with very audible interdental fricative (or spirant) phoneme. In contrast, a quarter of the words tested seems to come from Arabic, such as alɛafit (< Arabic [ɛāfja]) or (ǝ)lkes (< Arabic [kạ̄s]). This probably reveal a penetration of the Berber system, in proportions yet established by Ridwan Collins, in his study of the Berber of Tamezret. This Arabization can indirectly affect the sub-system of the verb (example [əxdəm] "to work", from Arabic). Finally, we may note that several of these words borrowed from Arabic agglutinate the article and the lexeme. As Penchoen or Ahmed Boukouss observe years ago, we can see in this fact an inability to integrate the Arabic word into the Berber reception system, and the index of a strong and ancient sociolinguistic pressure of Arabic.

=== Phonetic and phonological characteristics ===
For consonants, the Berber dialects of Djerba are in an intermediate position between the dialects with a "spirant" tendency of Algeria (such as Kabyle or Chaoui, which regularly present fricatives/spirants in place of occlusives), and the dialects where the occlusives are well maintained (like Tachelhit in Morocco, and Tamasheq in Algeria). A phenomenon comparable to what occurs in Hebrew (begadkefat) is observed in Djerba. The occlusives/plosives become fricatives after a vowel, but keep their occlusive character at the beginning of a word, or after a consonant.

For vocalism, it differs from most other varieties of Northern Berber, which generally have three cardinal vowel phonemes: /i/, /a/, /u/. Indeed, /ə/ may have phonological value here, at least in certain contexts. As a result, in Djerba (as also in Tamasheq), the themes of the aorist and the perfective of roots called "zero vocalism" are different (while they coincide in most other Berber dialects). For example, for əxdəm ("to work", borrowed from Arabic), the aorist theme is /xdm/ (purely consonantal), while the conjugate forms are realized by syllables containing ə, of changing position according to the context ([ta yəxdəm] "he will work", but [ta xədməɣ] "I will work"); the aorist's theme is /xdəm/, and contains the phoneme ə, whose position remains fixed across the paradigm ([yəxdəm] "he worked", [xdəməɣ] "I worked").

== Phonology ==
=== Consonants ===
| | | Labial | Dental | | Alveolar | | Post- alveolar | Palatal | Velar | Uvular | Pharyngeal | Glottal |
| | | Labial | plain | phar. | plain | phar. | Post- alveolar | Palatal | Velar | Uvular | Pharyngeal | Glottal |
|---|---|---|---|---|---|---|---|---|---|---|---|---|
| Plosive/ Affricate | voiceless | | | | t | tˤ | tʃ | | k | q | | |
| Plosive/ Affricate | voiced | b | | | d | dˤ | dʒ | | g | | | |
| Fricative | voiceless | f | θ | | s | sˤ | ʃ | ç | x | | ħ | h |
| Fricative | voiced | v | ð | ðˤ | z | zˤ | ʒ | | ɣ | | ʕ | |
| Trill | | | | | r | rˤ | | | | | | |
| Nasal | | m | | | n | | | | | | | |
| Lateral | | | | | l | | | | | | | |
| Approximant | | w | | | | | | j | | | | |

=== Vowels ===
| | Front | Central | Back |
|---|---|---|---|
| High | i | | u |
| Mid | | ə | |
| Low | a | | |

- /a/ may also range to [æ] in different positions.

== Ethno-toponymic characteristics ==
Toponymy is an excellent indicator of the ethnic roots of a region, but we do not have complete studies on the toponymy of Djerba, although the linguist Vermondo Brugnatelli has carried out surveys and partial studies on the toponymy of Djerba. Nevertheless, the work of Arthur Pellegrin (1949) gives various direct or indirect data on the island. Evelyne Ben Jaafar's book (1985) recalls various Libyco-Punic etymologies, although it does not specifically consider the Berber toponymy of Tunisia. An old but very useful work remains that of Émile Laoust (1942), a good model for approaching Amazigh toponymy of the Maghrib. On these points, regional archeology also brings various elements which militate for the continuity from ancient Libyan ("libyque") to modern Berber.

Berber onomastic marks appear especially in sectors where the local language seems to have held up better over time. Thus, in Guellala, a mosque is called Tamazguida, a common Berber designation in various parts of the Maghreb.

The visible Berber structures are the names of towns and villages, micro toponyms, or even ethnonyms (names of tribes). This last case was previously established for Sedouikech and Sedriyan, Ibn Khaldoun specifying: "The inhabitants [of Djerba] belong to the Berber race and are part of the Ketama tribe. Indeed, there are, even today, Sedouîkîch and Sadghîan, peoples of Ketamian origin [...] In ancient times, the Djerbians professed Kharedjism and even, nowadays, one finds there two branches of this heretical sect ". Another example is that of the toponym El May, which comes from the aṯ-Alemmay, a fraction of the same tribe of the Sedouikech.

Different Berber place names on the island have correspondents in the Maghreb, such as Taourirt for "small hill" (in the region of Houmt Souk), a very common type in Morocco and Algeria (from aourir "hill"), or Tamast (Sedouikech), also present in Algeria and Morocco under graphic variants such as Tamest. In these toponyms appears the discontinuous morphological scheme {t – t}, a regular formator of feminine or diminutive in Berber (see: aserḏun "mule", ṯaserḏunṯ "mule female", afus "hand", ṯafust "small hand"). Several other toponyms reproduce this structure, such as Tafertast (Sedouikech) or Tianest (Ouallagh). The Berber background appears in series which are not always immediately intelligible without toponymic field surveys: Aghir, Taguermess, Temlel (Midoun), Tarhdimess (Ouallagh), Tghala (Sedouikech), etc. According to Vermondo Brugnatelli, toponyms like Taguermes (s) or Tarhdimess illustrate a diachronic phonetic law in the final of lexia: * -st> -ss> -s. So we are allowed to restore toponyms typical of Berber and of the structure mentioned above: * Taguermest and * Tarhdimest.

Mainly located in the east and south of the island, a toponymy of Berber origin can be found further north (Ghizen, Tajdit), or towards the west, regions where Berber is no longer spoken in our days. This seems to be the case with Agga, close to Mellita. Here opens a linguistic space of contact with other languages of Antiquity in Tunisia. Mellita, like its North African equivalents, from Morocco to Libya (including Mellita, from the Kerkennah Islands in Tunisia), could be linked to the base already mentioned (amellall or amellul "white"), but also to a Punic root * MLT, attested in the generic name of Malta islands. Such contacts between the "Libyco-Berber" background and the Carthaginian (Semitic) stratum are plausible and frequently documented. One of the problems remains, however, the precision of the sure antic attestations, or that of restitution hypotheses. The importance of the Punic remains and the very nature of the materials collected allow us to glimpse an island that has long been opened to maritime, economic and cultural influences from outside (and for this reason rather welcoming to different toponymic influences): Greek, Hellenistic, Punic and Latin. For example, an islet in front of Ajim bears the name of Taɣlisya, local adaptation and evolution of the Latin ECCLESIA ("church"), a toponymic type otherwise frequent in North Africa 14. This is further illustrated by the site of Tala (or Henchir Tala), which does not fail to evoke the Pan-Berber name of the "source" or of the "water point" (tala or thala), as the site seems to have supplied water to the Meninx region, constituting the departure of an aqueduct towards the coastal city.

Of course, the toponymic meeting between Berber and Arab is extremely frequent across the Maghreb. This is the case in Djerba, for example for Ras Taguermess (Midoun) or Oued Amghar (Sedouikech), where a recurrent Arabic toponymic appellative (ras for "cape", oued for "river") has doubled the Berber item. It is also common for places to be named twice in Berber and Arabic. This phenomenon, very negative on the sociolinguistic level (because it prepares a toponymic replacement), is found regularly in the Maghreb and in Djerba too; for example, in the case already mentioned of Taɣlisya, called Guettâya Guebliya in Arabic, or in that of a neighboring islet, called Tawsiẖt in Jerba Berber, and Guettâyet el Bahariya in Arabic.

== From retreat to language death ==
North Africa has a deeply stable edifice of language, within which three language sources claim influence. The indigenous Berber languages, Romance languages (Latin, French, Spanish, and Italian), and Semitic languages (Punic, Arabic) have shared the linguistic domain of the region dating back to the Classical Period, given the Maghreb's proximity to many other Mediterranean languages and cultures. An outdated and largely discredited linguistic model considers Tunisia to be distinct from other Maghrebi countries by having a historically "much more fragile" Berber influence than in Algeria or Morocco, for example. Given Tunisia's extensive history of colonial subjugation, this is a highly incomplete picture of Tunisia's linguistic history. As of 2011, however, Arabic and French are used nearly equally, while Berber languages are minimized or ignored.

This trend has been observed in Djerba as well. Some scholars claim that the Berber-speaking population of the island has been in decline since the end of the 19th century, in both numerical and statutory terms. While there is a severe lack of demolinguistic data that attempts to estimate the real number of Berber speakers, the most recent study estimates a few thousand speakers remain. Almost all speakers are concentrated in the south-east of Djerba, and practice mainly partial, discreet, and even cryptic dialects, of the native language. Given the steep rate of decline, and the social context of Mediterranean tourism (and its negative effects), Berber may not survive. Djerba families, having been constrained by the historically rural nature of the island, are rapidly being forced to adapt to a globalized, tri-lingual Tunisian culture.

The decline of Djerba Berber may be attributed in part to a lack of local Berber-speaking elites, which have been influential in the preservation of Berber languages at the university and administrative levels in Morocco and Algeria. In contrast, Berber is not taught in any primary/secondary schools or universities, and the Tunisian government has failed to protect or preserve indigenous languages in the country. Likewise, the international movement to support endangered languages and identities (UNESCO type) does not seem to have any influence on language policy in Tunisia. The confluence of these factors will likely end with the disappearance of Berber, a textbook case of language death.

== Bibliography ==
- Akkari Weriemmi, Jenina (2004). "Le paysage funéraire libyco-punique de l'île de Djerba : les caveaux de Mellita" (PDF). Reppal (13): 5–33. ISSN 0330-843X. Archived from the original (PDF) on 2021-06-10.
- Akkari Weriemmi, Jenina (2004). "Le columbarium de Dar Al Ghoula à Djerba (Tunisie)" (PDF). Africa (20): 17–35. Archived from the original (PDF) on 2021-06-10.
- Basset, André (1950). "Les parlers berbères". Initiation à la Tunisie. Paris: Adrien Maisonneuve. pp. 220–226. (information from 1932 to 1938).
- Basset, René (April–June 1883). "Notes de lexicographie berbère, 1re série. - II. Dialecte de Djerbah". Journal Asiatique: 304–314.
- Ben Jaafar, Evelyne (1985). Les noms de lieux de Tunisie : racines vivantes de l'identité nationale. Tunis: Centre d'études et de recherches économiques et sociales.
- Ben Tahar, Sami (2016). "Henchir Tawrirt (Jerba) : un site libyque aux origines". Antiquités africaines (52): 9–52. doi:10.4000/antafr.544. ISSN 0066-4871.
- Boukous(s), Ahmed (1989). "Le berbère en Tunisie". Langue et société au Maghreb : bilan et perspectives. Rabat: Publications de la faculté des lettres de Rabat. pp. 143–150.
- Vermondo Brugnatelli, « Arabe et berbère à Jerba », dans Abderrahim Youssi, Fouzia Benjelloun, Mohamed Dahbi et Zakia Iraqui-Sinaceur, Aspects of the Dialects of Arabic Today. Proceedings of the 4th Conference of the International Arabic Dialectology Association (AIDA). Marrakesh, Apr. 1-4.2000. In Honour of Professor David Cohen, Rabat, Amapatril, 2002, pp. 169–178.
- Vermondo Brugnatelli, « Il berbero di Jerba: rapporto preliminare », Incontri Linguistici, n^{o} 21, 1998, pp. 115–128 (ISSN 0390-2412).
- Vermondo Brugnatelli, « Il berbero di Jerba: secondo rapporto preliminare », Incontri Linguistici, n^{o} 23, 2001, pp. 169–182 (ISSN 0390-2412)
- Vermondo Brugnatelli, « Notes d'onomastique jerbienne et mozabite », in Kamal Naït-Zerrad, Rainer Vossen (en) et Dymitr Ibriszimow, Nouvelles études berbères. Le verbe et autres articles. Actes du 2. Bayreuth-Frankfurter Kolloquium zur Berberologie 2002, Cologne, Köppe Verlag, 2004, pp. 29–39.
- Adolphe de Calassanti Motylinski, « Chanson berbère de Djerba », Bulletin de correspondance africaine, t. III, 1885, pp. 461–464.
- Adolphe de Calassanti Motylinski, « Dialogue et textes en berbère de Djerba », Journal asiatique,1897, pp. 377–401.
- Fathi Ben Maamar, Tanfust n elmiraz: Muqaddimāt li-dirāsat al-amāzīghiyyah al-tūnusiyyah al-mu`āṣirah [The Tale of Elmiraz: Introductions to the study of contemporary Tunisian Berber], Tunis, Maktabat Tunis, 2013, 240pp.
- Ridwan Collins, « Un microcosme berbère, système verbal et satellites dans trois parlers tunisiens », IBLA, n^{o} 148, 1981, pp. 287–303 (ISSN 0018-862X).
- Ridwan Collins, « Un microcosme berbère, système verbal et satellites dans trois parlers tunisiens », IBLA, n^{o} 149,1982, pp. 21–37 (ISSN 0018-862X).
- Ali Drine, « Le sanctuaire de Tala (Île de Jerba) », Reppal, n^{o} 12, 2002, p. 29-37 (ISSN 0330-843X).
- Ibn Khaldoun (trad. William Mac Guckin de Slane), Histoire des Berbères et des dynasties musulmanes de l'Afrique septentrionale, Alger, Imprimerie du gouvernement, 1847-1851 (réimpr. 1852-1856).
- Émile Laoust, Contribution à une étude de la toponymie du Haut-Atlas, I-Adrär n Deren : d'après les cartes de Jean Dresch, Paris, Paul Geuthner, 1942, 179 p.
- Jacques Leclerc, L'aménagement linguistique dans le monde. Site WEB (Université Laval, Québec).
- Francis Manzano, « Sur les mécanismes du paysage sociolinguistique et identitaire d'Afrique du Nord », Langage et société, 1996, pp. 5–43 (ISSN 0181-4095).
- Francis Manzano, « La fin du berbère à Jerba : repères sociolinguistiques et implications sur le système tripolaire de Tunisie », Cahiers de sociolinguistique, n^{o} 4 Langues du Maghreb et du Sud méditerranéen, 1999, pp. 47–74 ISBN 2-86847-412-8.
- Francis Manzano, « Sur l'implantation du français au Maghreb : systémique et fractures identitaires au tournant des 19^{e} et 20^{e} siècles », Le français en Afrique, n^{o} 22, 2007 (ISSN 1157-1454).
- Francis Manzano, « Le français en Tunisie, enracinement, forces et fragilités systémiques : rappels historiques, sociolinguistiques, et brefs éléments de prospective ». The International Journal of the Sociology of Language, numéro spécial Tunisie, Lotfi Sayahi (Albany) dir. 2011, pp. 1–23.
- Francis Manzano, Maghreb : une francophonie sur la brèche, une interface en Méditerranée, Lyon, Publications du Centre d'études linguistiques, 2011, 306 p. ISBN 978-2-36442-015-1.
- Arthur Pellegrin, Essai sur les noms de lieux d'Algérie et de Tunisie : étymologie, signification, Tunis, SAPI, 1949, 244 p.
- Thomas Penchoen, « La langue berbère en Tunisie et la scolarisation des enfants berbérophones », Revue tunisienne de sciences sociales, vol. 5, n^{o} 13, 1968, pp. 173–186 (ISSN 0035-4333).
- Yamen Sghaïer, « Une tombe punique à Mellita (Îles Kerkennah - Tunisie) », Antiquités africaines, n^{o} 55, 2019, pp. 53–69 (ISSN 0066-4871).
- René Stablo, Les Djerbiens : une communauté arabo-berbère dans une île de l'Afrique française, Tunis, SAPI, 1941, 165 p.
