= Zenati languages =

Branch of Northern Berber languages

Zenati
- Geographic distribution: North Africa
- Linguistic classification: Afro-Asiatic: Berber; Northern Berber; Zenati
- Subdivisions: Riffian; Mzab–Wargla; Libyan and Tunisian; Western Algerian; Eastern Moroccan; Iznasen; Eastern Middle Atlas; Shawiya

Language codes
- Glottolog: zena1250

The Zenati languages are a branch of the Northern Berber language family of North Africa. They were named after the medieval Zenata Berber tribal confederation. They were first proposed in the works of French linguist Edmond Destaing (1915) (1920–23). Zenata dialects are distributed across the central Berber world (Maghreb), from northeastern Morocco to just west of Algiers, and the northern Sahara, from southwestern Algeria around Béchar to Zuwara in Libya. The most widely spoken Zenati languages are Tmazight of the Rif in northern Morocco and Tashawit Berber in northeastern Algeria, each of which have over 3 million speakers.

== Languages ==
=== Kossmann (2013) ===
According to Kossmann (2013: 21–24), Zenati is a rather arbitrary grouping, in which he includes the following varieties:

- Riffian (Riffian Berber, or Rif-Berber, local name: Tmaziɣt, north of Morocco); (Note: If not asked to name their particular Berber language, speakers tend to report Tmaziɣt as the local name. This name is however very ambiguous: Iznasen, Matmata Berber, Beni Snous dialect, South Oran and Figuig Berber speakers all use this term.) Includes Arzew dialect, in Arzew in western Algeria
- Eastern Morocco Zenati (north east of Morocco)
- Iznasen
- Eastern Middle Atlas: Ait Seghrouchen and a group of dialects including Ait Warain (Ayt Warayn) (north-central Morocco)
- Western Algerian, west of Algiers (a diffuse group):
  - Beni Snous (Tlemcen) dialect, in western Algeria near the border
  - Jebel Bissa (intelligible with Shenwa)
  - Shenwa (Chenoua), between Tipasa and Ténès in north-central Algeria west of Algiers
  - Beni Messaoud (Shenwa?)
  - Beni Menacer
  - Metmata (of Algeria; distinct from Matmata Berber of Tunisia)
  - etc. (see article)
- Shawiya (Chaouia), around Batna and Khenchela, south of Constantine in northeastern Algeria
- Mzab–Wargla (Northern Saharan oases):
  - South Oran and Figuig, in the ksours along the Algerian–Moroccan border and in Figuig in southeastern Morocco
  - Gourara Berber (Taznatit) (Gourara, southwestern Algeria, around Timimoun)
  - Tidikelt and Tuat (Touat, Algeria)
  - Mozabite aka Mzab, Tumzabt (northern Algerian Sahara, near Ghardaia)
  - Wargla (Ouargli aka Tagergrent, Teggargarent), northern Algerian Sahara, near Ouargla
  - Oued Righ Berber (incl. Touggourt; Ethnologue name "Temacine Tamazight") in Oued Righ, around Touggourt and Temacine, Algeria
- Southeastern Tunisian–Libyan: Djerbi (island of Djerba), Douiret (Douiret in southern Tunisia), Matmata Berber (Matmata), Sened and Zuwara Berber (Zuwara in northwestern Libya)

== Features ==
According to Kossmann (1999:31-32, 86, 172), common innovations defining the Zenati languages include:

- The vowel a- in nominal prefixes is dropped in a number of words when it precedes CV, where C is a single consonant and V is a full (non-schwa) vowel. For example, afus "hand" is replaced with fus. (A similar development is found in some Eastern Berber languages, but not Nafusi.)
- Verbs whose original aorist forms end in -u while their perfect forms end in -a end up with -a in the aorist as well, leaving the aorist / perfect distinction unmarked for these verbs. For example, *ktu "forget", Siwi ttu, becomes Ouargli tta. (This also affects Nafusi.)
- Verbs consisting (in the aorist) of two consonants with no vowel other than schwa fall into two classes elsewhere in Berber: one where a variable final vowel appears in the perfect form, and one which continues to lack a final vowel in the perfect. In Zenati, the latter class has been entirely merged into the former in the perfect, with the single exception of the negative perfect of *əɣ s "want". For example, Kabyle (non-Zenati) gər "throw", pf. -gər (int. -ggar), corresponds to Ouargli (Zenati) gər, pf. -gru. (This change also affects Nafusi; Basset (1929:9) gives examples where it appears not to occur in Chenoua.)
- Proto-Berber *-əβ has become -i in Zenati. For example, *arəβ "write" becomes ari. (This change also occurs in varieties including the Central Atlas Tamazight dialect of the Izayan, Nafusi, and Siwi.)
- Proto-Berber palatalised k´ and g´, corresponding to k and g in non-Zenati varieties, become š and ž in Zenati (although a fair number of irregular correspondences for this are found.) For example, k´ăm "you (f. sg.)" becomes šəm. (This change also occurs in Nafusi and Siwi.)

In addition to the correspondence of k and g to š and ž, Chaker (1972), while expressing uncertainty about the linguistic coherence of Zenati, notes as shared Zenati traits:

- A proximal demonstrative suffix "this" -u, rather than -a
- A final -u in the perfect of two-consonant verbs, rather than -a (e.g. yə-nsu "he slept" rather than yə-nsa elsewhere)

These characteristics identify a more restricted subset of Berber than those previously mentioned, mainly northern Saharan varieties; they exclude, for example, Chaoui and all but the easternmost Rif dialects.
