= Sheliff Basin Berber =

Berber variety of Algeria

- Sheliff
- Native to: Algeria
- Language family: Afro-Asiatic: Berber; Northern; Zenati; Western Algerian; Sheliff Basin Berber

Language codes
- ISO 639-3: None (mis)
- Glottolog: None

Sheliff Basin Berber is a variety of the Berber languages that is spoken in Algeria. It is traditionally taken to be a dialect of Shenwa, one of the Western Algerian Zenati languages. Blench (2006) argues instead that the variety is part of the Riffian dialect cluster.

== See also ==
- Chelif River for which Sheliff is an alternative spelling.
