= Sened =

Sened may refer to:

- Sened (town), Tunisia
  - Sened (language), an extinct Berber language
- The Charter of Alliance (Turkish: Sened-i İttifak)

== See also ==
- Senedd, Wales's devolved legislature
  - Senedd building, where it meets
