= Gerrit Dimmendaal =

Dutch linguist

- Born: Gerrit Jan Dimmendaal; 1955 (age 70–71)
- Occupation: Linguist

Academic background
- Education: Leiden University

Academic work
- Institutions: University of Cologne
- Main interests: Nilo-Saharan languages

Gerrit Jan Dimmendaal (born 1955) is a Dutch linguist and Africanist. His research interests focused mainly on the Nilo-Saharan languages.

He completed his studies (1973–1978) in African studies, Arabic studies, history, and comparative literature at Leiden University, and graduating with a doctorate in 1982. He has been Professor of African Studies at University of Cologne since 2000.

== Selected works ==
- The Turkana language. Dordrecht 1983, ISBN 90-70176-83-1.
- with Marco Last: Surmic languages and cultures. Köln 1998, ISBN 3-89645-131-6.
- Coding participant marking. Construction types in twelve African languages. Amsterdam 2009, ISBN 978-90-272-0577-3.
- Historical linguistics and the comparative study of African languages. Amsterdam 2011, ISBN 978-90-272-1178-1.
- The Oxford Handbook of African Languages co-edited with Rainer Vossen. 2020. Oxford University Press.
