= Blidean Atlas Tamazight =

Berber language

- Blidean Atlas Kabyle; Blidean Atlas Tachelhit
- Tamaziɣt n waṭlas ablidi aqvaylit Bwaṭlaṣ avlidi Ṯacelḥiṯ n Waṭlas abliḏi
- Native to: Algeria
- Region: Blidean Atlas
- Ethnicity: Blidean Atlas Berbers
- Native speakers: c. 100,000
- Language family: Afro-Asiatic: Berber; Northern; Western Algerian; Blidean Atlas Tamazight
- Writing system: Latin

Language codes
- ISO 639-2: ber
- ISO 639-3: –
- Glottolog: ber
- IETF: ber
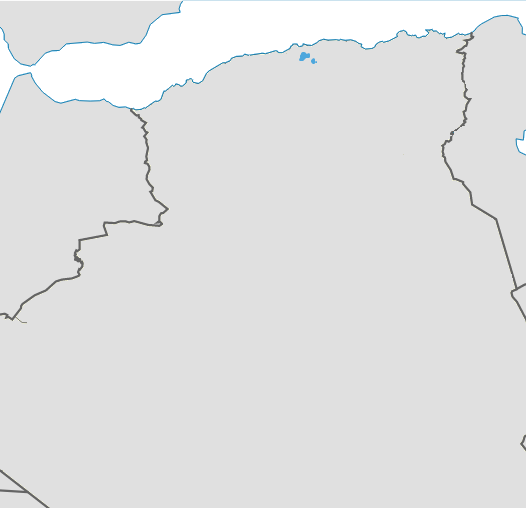

The Western Algerian Zenati languages.

Blidean Atlas Tamazight, also called Blidean Atlas Kabyle or Blidean Atlas Tachelhit (Berber languages: Tamaziɣt n waṭlas ablidi, Taqvaylit Bwaṭlaṣ avlidi, Ṯacelḥiṯ n Waṭlas abliḏi) is a Zenati Berber language spoken in the Blidean Atlas region, in Algeria.
