= Ait Seghrouchen Berber =

Zenati Berber language of east-central Morocco

- Tmaziġt, Tamaziġt
- Native to: Morocco
- Region: Central Morocco – Middle Atlas
- Language family: Afro-Asiatic: Berber; Northern Berber; Zenati; Eastern Middle Atlas; Ait Seghrouchen Berber
- Writing system: Tifinagh, Latin

Language codes
- ISO 639-3: None (mis)
- Linguist List: tzm-cen (Seghrušen of Mzab-Wargla)
- Glottolog: None

Ait Seghrouchen Berber, or Seghroucheni (Seghrusheni), is a Zenati Berber language of the Eastern Middle Atlas Berber cluster. It is spoken by the Ait Seghrouchen tribe inhabiting east-central Morocco.

== Classification ==
Ait Seghrouchen Berber is commonly classed as Central Atlas Tamazight. It is reported to be mutually intelligible with the neighbouring Berber dialect of Ait Ayache. Genetically, however, it belongs to the Zenati subgroup of Northern Berber, rather than to the Atlas subgroup to which the rest of Central Atlas Tamazight belongs, and are therefore excluded by some sources from Central Atlas Tamazight.

Ait Seghrouchen is part of the Eastern Middle Atlas Berber cluster of Zenati dialects, which is spoken in the eastern Middle Atlas.

== Phonology ==
=== Consonants ===
Ayt Seghrouchen is notable for having the lateral fricative [ɬ] as an allophone of the sequence /lt/. /k, g/ are pronounced as stops, unlike the closely related Ayt Ayache dialect in which they are fricatives.

In the table below, when consonants appear in pairs, the one on the left is voiceless.

Ayt Seghrouchen consonants (Ayt Ayache)
		Labial	Dental/ Alveolar	Palatal	Velar	Uvular	Pharyn- geal (Note: mainly in Arabic borrowings)	Glottal
Nasal		m	nˤ					
Plosive	voiceless		tˤ (Note: /t/ is aspirated [tʰ])		k			
Plosive	voiced	b (Note: for a small number of speakers, /b/ is sometimes lenited to [β])	dˤ		ɡ			
Fricative	voiced	b	zˤ	ʒ		ʁ	ʕ	
Fricative	voiceless	f	sˤ	ʃ		χ	ħ	h
Fricative	lateral		(ɬ) (Note: realization of the sequence /lt/ for some speakers, e.g. ultma 'sister', altu 'not yet')					
Approximant			lˤ	j	w			
Rhotic (Note: Abdel-Massih refers to this as a "flap" produced with "vibration" of the tongue.)			rˤ					

=== Vowels ===
Ait Seghrouchen Berber has a typical phonemic three-vowel system, similarly to Classical Arabic:

Tamazight vowel phonemes
	Front	Back
Close	i	u
Open	a	

These phonemes have numerous allophones, conditioned by the following environments:

(# denotes word boundary, X denotes C_{[−flat −/χ/ −/ʁ/]}, C̣ denotes C_{[+flat]}, G denotes C, /χ/, and /ʁ/)

Tamazight vowel allophony
Phoneme	Realization	Environment	Example	Gloss
/i/	[i]	#_X	/ili/	'to exist'
/i/	[ɨ]	#_Xː / Xː_	/idːa/	'he went'
/i/	[ɪ] [e]	_G / G_	/dˤːiqs/	'to burst out'
/i/	[ɪj]	X_#	/isːfrˤħi/	'he made me happy'
/u/	[u]	#_X / X(ː)_X	/umsʁ/	'I painted'
/u/	[ʊ] [o]	_G / G_	/idˤurˤ/	'he turned'
/u/	[ʊw]	X(ː)_#	/bdu/	'to begin'
/u/	[ʉ]	kː_ / ɡː_	/lːajɡːur/	'he goes'
/a/	[æ]	#_X(ː) / X(ː)_X	/azn/	'to send'
/a/	[ɐ]	X(ː)_#	/da/	'here'
/a/	[ɑ]	_C̣ / C̣_	/ħadˤr/	'to be present'

Phonetic Schwa

There is a predictable non-phonemic vowel inserted into consonant clusters, realized as [ɪ̈] before front consonants (e.g. /b t d .../) and [ə] before back consonants (e.g. /k χ .../). These are some of the rules governing the occurrence of [ə]:

(# denotes word boundary, L denotes /l r m n/, H denotes /h ħ ʕ w j/)

Tamazight schwa epenthesis
Environment	Realization	Example	Pronunciation	Gloss
#C(ː)#	əC(ː)	/ɡ/	[əɡ]	'to be, to do'
#LC#	əLC or LəC	/ns/	[əns] ~ [nəs]	'to spend the night'
#CC#	CəC	/tˤsˤ/	[tˤəsˤ]	'to laugh'
#CːC#	əCːəC	/fːr/	[əfːər]	'to hide'
#CCC#	CCəC / C1C2 are not {L H}	/χdm/	[χdəm]	'to work'
#CCC#	CCəC / C1C2 are not {L H}	/zʕf/	[zʕəf]	'to get mad'
#CCC#	əCCəC or #CəCəC# / {C1 C3} is {L H}	/hdm/	[əhdəm] ~ [hədəm]	'to demolish'
#CCC#	CəCəC / C2C3 = {L H}	/dˤmn/	[dˤəmən]	'to guarantee'

=== Stress ===
Word stress is non-contrastive and predictable — it falls on the last vowel in a word (including schwa).

== Bibliography ==
- Abdel-Massih, Ernest T. (1971a). A Course in Spoken Tamazight. Ann Arbor: University of Michigan. ISBN 0-932098-04-5.
- Abdel-Massih, Ernest T. (1971b). A Reference Grammar of Tamazight. Ann Arbor: University of Michigan. ISBN 0-932098-05-3.
- Bentolila, Fernand (1981). Grammaire fonctionnelle d'un parler berbère. Aït Seghrouchen d'Oum Jeniba (Maroc). Paris: Société d'Études Linguistiques et anthropologiques de France. ISBN 2-85297-107-0.
- Destaing, Edmond (2001–2002) [1915]. "Essai de classification des dialectes berbères du Maroc". Études et Documents Berbères. 19–20.
- Kossmann, Maarten G. (1995). "Les verbes à i final en zénète: étude historique" (PDF). Études et Documents Berbères. 13 (2): 99–104. doi:10.3917/edb.013.0099. S2CID 171171745. Archived from the original (PDF) on 2011-07-18.
- Kossman, Maarten G. (1999). Essai sur la phonologie du proto-berbère. Köln: Köppe Verlag. ISBN 3-89645-035-2.
- Pellat, Charles (1955). Textes berbères dans le parler des Aït Seghrouchen de la Moulouya. Paris: Larose.
- "Le Tamazight (Maroc central) – Tamaziɣt". Centre de recherche berbère. Institut national des langues et civilisations orientales. Archived from the original on 2023-12-13.
