= Battle of Oued Isly (1876) =

- Part of Angad–Iznassen tribal war
- Depiction of the clashes in Le Monde Illustré.
Date	After 8 April 1876
Location	Oued Isly, Morocco
Result	Ahl Angad victory

Belligerents
Ahl Angad; Mhaya	Beni Iznassen

Commanders and leaders
Unknown	Caid ben el-Bechir az-Znasseni

Strength
Unknown	3,000 cavalrymen

Casualties and losses
Unknown	Heavy losses (approx. 200 killed near the gates of Oujda) and 2 tribal chiefs killed

The Battle of Oued Isly, or Combat of Oued Isly, was a brutal clash that took place in April 1876 at the Oued Isly in Morocco. It involved the Ahl Angad and the Beni Iznassen tribes, resulting in a victory for the former. The engagement occurred against the backdrop of an ongoing tribal war that had persisted since 1873.

== Background ==
In 1873, a conflict erupted between the Beni Iznassen and the Ahl Angad tribes. This prolonged feud dragged on until 1876, characterized by frequent skirmishes. As the local situation became increasingly untenable, the Sharif of Maghnia, Moulay Abd as-Salam, traveled to Oujda in an attempt to reconcile the two factions. Only a few days prior, a violent clash had resulted in the defeat of the Beni Iznassen, who were massacred beneath the olive trees outside Oujda. Utilizing his religious authority as a descendant of the Prophet, the Sharif successfully negotiated a peace agreement, and the tribes initially complied. However, this peace proved short-lived; as soon as the Sharif departed the city, hostilities resumed.

== Course of the battle ==
Taking advantage of the Sharif's departure, the caid of the Beni Iznassen, Ben el-Bechir, assembled an armed force of approximately 3,000 men. They launched a surprise attack on two encampments belonging to the Ahl Angad, who had remained entirely off-guard, trusting in the recently signed peace treaty.

As gunfire erupted, the remaining Ahl Angad forces in the vicinity heard the noise and rushed to the camps, realizing the Beni Iznassen had broken the agreement. The counter-charge by the furious Angad cavalry overwhelmed the Iznassen infantry, who were severely cut to pieces. During this initial phase of the battle, two Iznassen chiefs were killed.

The situation deteriorated further for the Beni Iznassen when the Mhaya tribe, allies of the Ahl Angad, intervened by flanking them through the Chayr Pass. The Iznassen forces were systematically broken and forced into a chaotic retreat toward the walls of Oujda, where the slaughter continued. Following the engagement, around 200 bodies were found near the city walls, left to the vultures. The surviving Iznassen fighters fled into the surrounding mountains. These events were primarily documented by the French weekly newspaper Le Monde illustré later that year.

== Aftermath ==
On 18 September 1876, Sultan Hassan I personally received delegations from both tribes in an effort to mediate a permanent settlement. A peace treaty was concluded, which included provisions for the restitution and reimbursement of property plundered by both sides. However, the truce was only superficial; as soon as the Sultan departed, neither tribe respected the terms of the agreement, and instability persisted in the region.
