= Beni Snous dialect =

Berber variety of Tlemcen, Algeria

Beni Snous, At Snous
- Tmaziɣt
- Native to: Algeria
- Region: near Tlemcen
- Native speakers: few
- Language family: Afro-Asiatic: Berber; Northern; Zenati; Beni Snous, At Snous

Language codes
- ISO 639-3: –
- Glottolog: beni1254

Beni Snous Berber or At Snous Berber (native name: Tmaziɣt) is a Zenati Berber variety spoken near Tlemcen in Algeria.

In the early 20th century, Beni Snous Berber was spoken in the villages of Kef, Tghalimet, Bou Hallou, Ait Larbi, Ait Achir, Adziddaz, and Mazzer; all speakers were bilingual in the Arabic language. The Beni Snous had no trouble conversing with their Berber-speaking neighbours among the Beni Bou Said just to the west, and (with some difficulty) could communicate in Berber with people from Figuig, Beni Iznacen, beside the border in Morocco. However, they found Tashelhiyt (in southern Morocco) and Kabyle (in central Algeria) almost unintelligible.

Today, only a few elderly people in the region still speak Berber. Most of the Beni Snous have shifted to Arabic, retaining only a few words from their ancestral language, such as tabɣa "blackberries" or azduz "pestle".

== See also ==
- Languages of Algeria

== Bibliography ==
- Destaing, Edmond (1907). Etude sur le dialecte berbère des Beni-Snous. Paris: Ernest Leroux.
- Destaing, Edmond (1914). Dictionnaire français-berbère: Dialecte des Beni-Snous. Paris: Ernest Leroux.
- Souag, Lameen; Kherbache, Fatma (9 June 2014). "Syntactically conditioned code-switching? The syntax of numerals in Beni-Snous Berber". International Journal of Bilingualism. 18 (4). SAGE: 97–115. doi:10.1177/1367006914536002. ISSN 1756-6878. S2CID 144281357.
