= Matmata Berber =

East Zenati language spoken in Matmata, Tunisia

- Eddwi nna
- Tmaziɣṯ
- Native to: Tunisia
- Region: Matmata, Tunisia
- Native speakers: (3,700 cited 1975)
- Language family: Afro-Asiatic: Berber; Northern; Zenati; East; Matmata Berber

Language codes
- ISO 639-3: None (mis)
- Glottolog: jbal1238 Jbali-Tamezret tame1243 Tamezret – duplicate entry
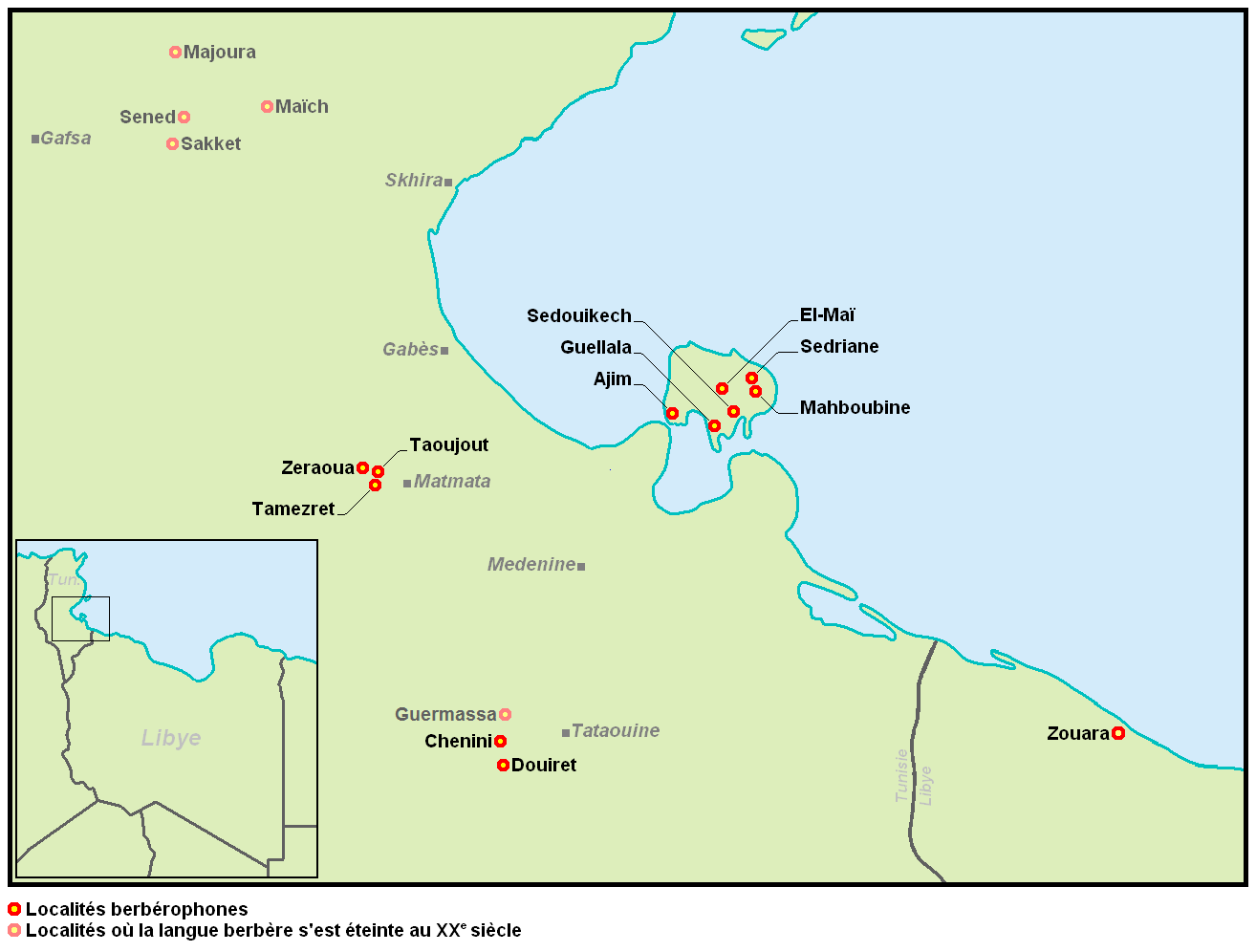
- Berber-speaking areas belonging to Kossmann's "Tunisian-Zuwara" dialectal group

Matmata Berber is a Zenati Berber dialect spoken around the town of Matmâta in southern Tunisia, and in the villages of Taoujjout, Tamezret and Zrawa. According to Ben Mamou's lexicon, its speakers call it Tmaziɣṯ or Eddwi nna, meaning "our speech", while it is called Shelha or Jbali (جبالي) in local Tunisian Arabic dialects. The total population speaking this variety was estimated at 3,726 in 1975.

Documentation of Matmata Berber is limited. A collection of fairy tales in this variety was published by Stumme in 1900. Basset (1950) provides a few dialect maps of Tunisian Berber including this region, showing lexical variation, while Penchoen (1968) offers a general discussion of Tunisian Berber and the effects of schooling. Collins (1981) discusses its verbal morphology along with that of other Tunisian Berber varieties. The only general grammatical sketch and vocabulary available is the website put together by Larbi Ben Mamou, a native speaker of the language.

Ethnologue treats it as part of the Nafusi language spoken in northwestern Libya, although the two belong to different subgroups of Berber according to Kossmann (1999).
