= Western Algerian Zenatic dialects =

Map of Berber-speaking areas in north-western Algeria

The Western Algerian Zenatic dialects are a diffuse set of Zenati Berber dialects spoken in north-western Algeria, west of the capital Algiers.

The Western Algerian group of Berber dialects include Chenoua (within which is Gouraya) and Snous. It also comprises the Berber dialects spoken in smaller areas of Blida, Medea, Miliana and Ouarsenis (i.e. Blench's Chelif Berber), as well as the nearly (or already?) extinct dialects of Achacha, Aït H'lima and Bathia, for most of which we have no linguistic data.
