= Douiret language =

Berber language spoken in Tunisia

Douiret
- Chninni
- Native to: Tunisia
- Language family: Afro-Asiatic: Berber; Northern; Zenati; East; Douiret

Language codes
- ISO 639-3: None (mis)
- Glottolog: doui1234
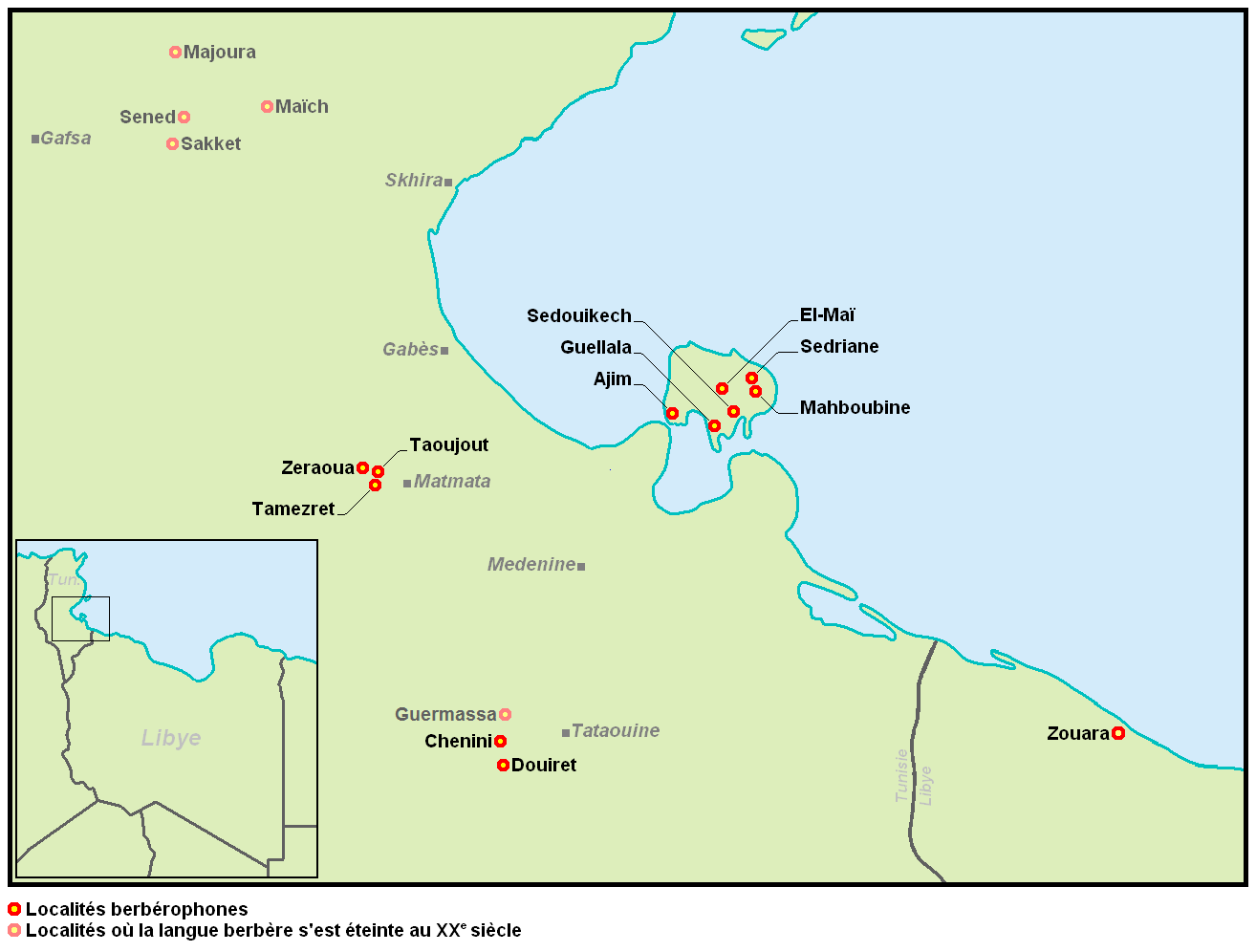
- Berber-speaking areas belonging to Kossmann's "Tunisian-Zuwara" dialectal group

Douiret (also called Douiri) is a Berber language variety spoken in Douiret in the southern part of mainland Tunisia. Like all other varieties of Tunisian Berber, it is also referred to as Shilha. It is closely related to the Berber variety of Chenini.

== Phonology ==
=== Consonants ===
		Labial		Dental		Alveolar		Post-alv./ Palatal	Velar		Uvular	Pharyn- geal	Glottal
		plain	phar.	plain	phar.	plain	phar.	Post-alv./ Palatal	plain	lab.	Uvular	Pharyn- geal	Glottal
Plosive/ Affricate	voiceless					t	tˤ	tʃ	k	(kʷ)	q		
Plosive/ Affricate	voiced	b				d	dˤ	dʒ	g	(ɡʷ)			
Fricative	voiceless	f	fˤ	θ		s	sˤ	ʃ	x			ħ	h
Fricative	voiced			ð	ðˤ	z	zˤ	ʒ	ɣ	(ɣʷ)		ʕ	
Nasal		m	mˤ			n	nˤ						
Lateral						l	lˤ						
Trill						r	rˤ						
Approximant								j		w			

- Most consonant sounds may also have geminated variants as [Cː].
- Pharyngeal sounds /fˤ, mˤ, dˤ, zˤ, rˤ, nˤ, lˤ/ are mostly heard as allophonic variants of /f, m, d, z, r, n, l/ within intervocalic and pharyngeal positions.
- Sounds /t, k/ may have aspirated allophones of [tʰ, kʰ] when in word-final and pre-consonantal positions.
- /k, ɡ, ɣ/ may also have labialized allophones as [kʷ, ɡʷ, ɣʷ].

	Front	Back
High	i	u
Mid	(e)	(o)
Low	a	

Phoneme	Allophones	Rules
/i/	[i]	elsewhere
/i/	[iː]	in word-final position or within monosyllabic words
/i/	[ɪ]	when preceding geminated consonants
/a/	[a]	elsewhere
/a/	[aː]	in word-initial position when preceding a consonant
/a/	[æ]	in word-initial position or when following pharyngealized consonants
/a/	[e]	when preceding geminated consonants
/a/	[eː]	when following pharyngealized consonants in word-final positions
/u/	[u]	elsewhere
/u/	[uː]	in word-final position or within monosyllabic words
/u/	[ʊ]	when preceding geminated consonants
/u/	[o]	when preceding pharyngealized consonants
/u/	[oː]	when following pharyngealized consonants in word-final positions
