= Dania Ben Sassi =

Libyan singer

Dania Ben Sassi Danya At Sasi
- Born: 1988 (age 37–38); Belgrade, Serbia
- Instrument: Voice

Dania Ben Sassi, Tamazight: Danya At Sasi, Arabic: دانيا بن ساسي (born 1988) is a Libyan Amazigh singer whose music went viral during the First Libyan Civil War, due to the fact her music praises Amazigh resistance and are sung in Tamazight.

== Early life ==
Dania Ben Sassi was born in Belgrade, Serbia in 1988, to a Libyan father from Zuwarah and a Serbian mother. Her father had been forced into exile in Serbia, after fleeing the Gaddafi regime due to his activism for Libyan Berber rights. She is fluent in Serbian and Libyan Tamazight and can write Tifinagh. She studied economics at the University of Belgrade.

== Musical career ==
Ben Sassi's music is inspired by the Amazighs of Libya and their resistance to cultural assimilation. The majority of her music and lyrics are written by her father, who is also her manager. His activist influence is clear, since Ben Sassi's music anchors Amazigh identity in Libya and demands that the Amazigh language be recognised by the Libyan constitution. Tamazight was severely repressed in Libya when Gaddafi was in power.

It is due to the circulation of her songs on the internet that she became an icon during the democratic uprisings that preceded the First Libyan Civil War. The singer has been described as "the swallow of the Libyan Amazigh spring" by the writer Lhoussain Azergui. Amazigh history has inspired much of Ben Sassi's music, for example: Numidya (Numidia), which takes the name of the Numidian Berber kingdom.

In 2011 Ben Sassi released her song 'The Revolutionary Our Star' in Tamazight, which according to the political researcher Nadine Schnelzer "is remarkable in itself". The fact the song, and her music more generally praises the sacrifices made by the Libyans during the revolution, explains why she has become an icon of the Libyan Amazigh movement. Her music also addresses issues of gender facing Libyan and Amazigh communities.

In 2013 she performed on French television, on a programme on France 2 entitled 'The Night of Ramadan'.

== Discography ==
- Tidet/ The Truth - تيدت - ⵜⵉⴷⴻⵜ
- Agrawli Itri nnegh/The Revolutionary Our star - أكًراولي إثري نًغ - ⴰⴳⵔⴰⵡⵍⵉ ⵉⵜⵔⵉ ⵏⴻⵖ
- Numidya - نوميديا - ⵏⵓⵎⵉⴷⵉⵢⴰ
- Abrid n Tilelli/The Path to Freedom - أبريد ن تينللي - ⴰⴱⵔⵉⴷ ⵏ ⵜⵉⵍⴻⵍⵍⵉ
- Sfeḍ imeṭṭawen-im a weltma/Wipe away your tears my sister - سفض يمطًاون إم ا ولتما
