= 2012 Libyan local elections =

Local elections were held in Zuwarah in 2011 and in several other municipalities in Libya during 2012.

== Zuwarah ==
Zuwarah residents elected their local council in 2011, following the 2011 Libyan Civil War.

== Benghazi ==
Municipal elections were held in Benghazi on 19 May 2012. More than 200,000 people registered to vote in Benghazi, and 414 candidates stood for election for the 41 free seats in the 44-member City Council. These are the first elections of their kind in Benghazi since the 1960s. Given the large number of candidates, there has been not very much time for them to campaign and present their views to the people of the 11 Districts of Benghazi.

According to the head of Benghazi's electoral commission, Suleiman Zubi, a total of 138,312 people voted in the election, with turnout between 64% and 69%. Despite 22 female candidates standing for election, only one female, Najat Rashid Mansur Al-Kikhia, was elected to the council. Al-Kikhia did however receive the most votes of any individual candidate.

== Misrata ==
Municipal elections were held in Misrata on 20 February 2012. The elections to the 28-member City Council were one of the first held after the fall of the Gaddafi regime. Only one member of the existing council stood for re-election.

Of the 156,000 eligible voters, 101,486 people were registered to vote, with a turnout of 57% being given by officials. All of the elected councilors were independents, with Yousef Ben Yousef being elected as the new mayor of Misrata, and 5 other councilors joining the council's executive.

== Sabratha ==
Municipal elections were held in Sabratha on 7 October 2012. Deya-Uddin Al-Gharabli was elected as the Council Chairman. There was not a high turnout for the election.
