= Battle of Menabha =

- Part of the French conquest of Morocco
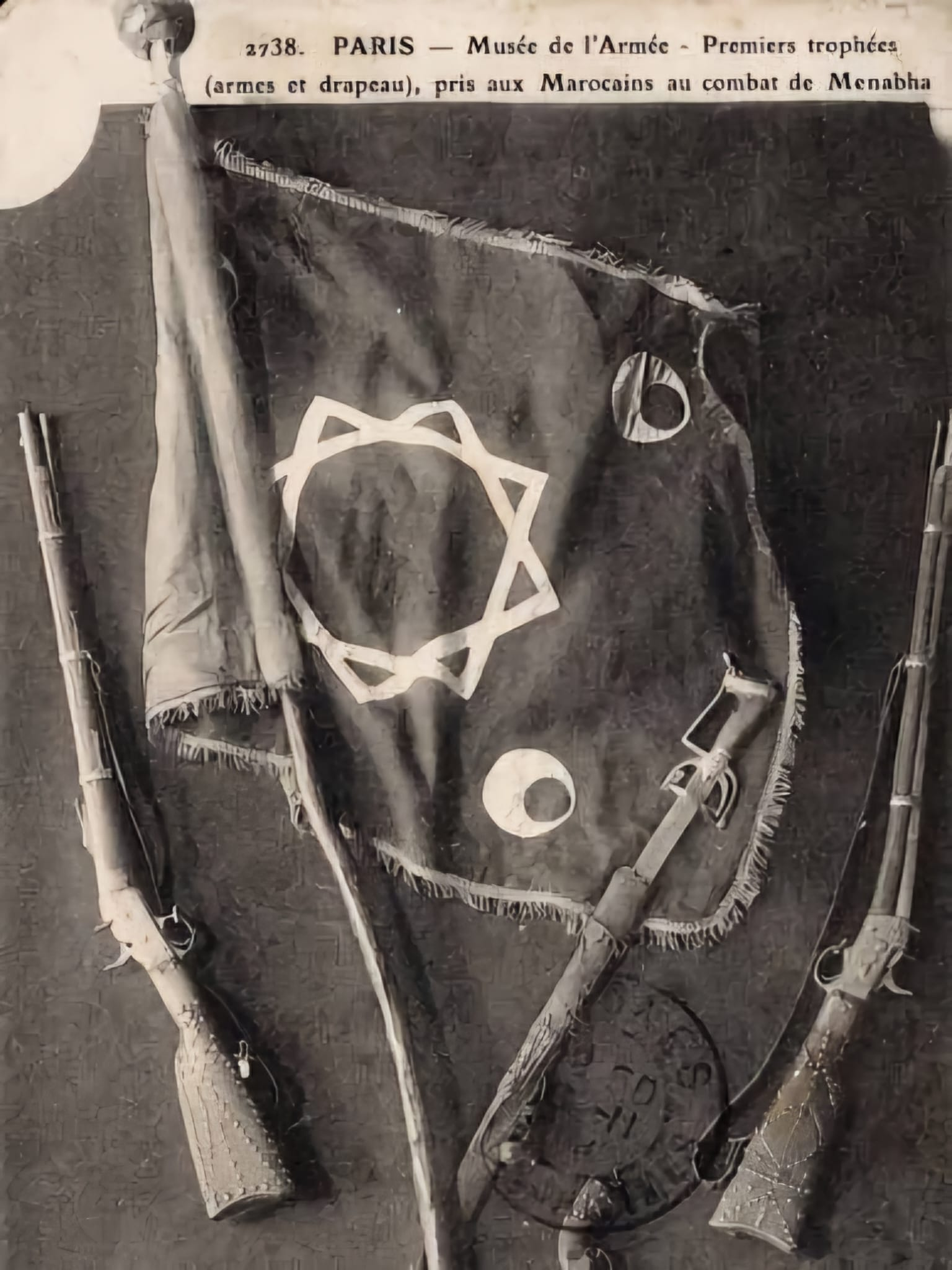
Date	April 16 1908 31°51′00.0″N 2°18′00.0″W
Location	Menabha, Béchar Province, Algerian-Moroccan borderlands
Result	French Victory

Belligerents
France	Ait Seghrouchen

Commanders and leaders
(France) Colonel Alix	H’mad Oulahcen Seghrouchni

Units involved
(French Third Republic) Foreign Legion	Harkas

Strength
(French Third Republic) 1,500 troops (French Third Republic) 2 Foreign Legion companies (French Third Republic) 1.5 Spahis cavalry squadrons (French Third Republic) 1 Machine gun platoon (French Third Republic) 1 Mountain artillery platoon	~2,300 warriors Tribal infantry Berber cavalry

Casualties and losses
(French Third Republic) 19 killed (including 11 legionnaires and Lieutenant Coste); 85 wounded	Over 100 killed Many wounded

The Battle of Menabha (also known as the Combat de Menabha) was a military engagement fought on April, 16 1908, between a French colonial expeditionary column and Moroccan tribal resistance fighters. Taking place in the Algerian-Moroccan borderlands, the engagement marked the first major action of the 1908 Campaign of Upper Guir, a critical phase during the early period of the French conquest.

== Background ==
By 1907, French forces were increasingly penetrating the interior of North Africa along the poorly defined frontier separating French Algeria from the Sultanate of Morocco. French military strategy relied on mobile tactical columns to secure supply lines and establish outposts. This expansion faced stiff armed resistance from localized confederations of Berber and Arab tribes, who routinely targeted French supply routes and outposts.

Following the "Forthassa Disaster" in February 1908—where a severe snowstorm claimed the lives of 38 legionnaires—French authorities sought to stabilize the volatile Upper Guir region. Lieutenant Colonel Pierron was dispatched with a combined-arms force to assert control over the borderlands near El Menabha,

== Course of the battle ==
The engagement began when Lieutenant Colonel Pierron's tactical column was intercepted and aggressively attacked by a large tribal harka. The Moroccan force, totaling approximately 2,300 fighters under the leadership of regional resistance figures like H'mad Oulahcen Seghrouchni, launched coordinated charges against the French positions.

The French defensive structure relied heavily on its infantry core, anchored by two companies of the French Foreign Legion. Supported by a specialized machine gun platoon and a light mountain artillery platoon, the French infantry established a disciplined perimeter. The concentrated firepower inflicted heavy casualties on the oncoming tribal infantry.

To break the momentum of the Tribes, the French deployed one and a half squadrons of Spahis (indigenous North African cavalry serving in the French Army) alongside a Saharan auxiliary platoon. The mobile counter-attacks successfully fragmented the tribal lines, forcing the harka into a full retreat.

== Aftermath ==
The French victory at Menabha successfully secured the immediate Upper Guir sector and allowed Pierron's column to complete its tactical objectives. However, the victory came at the cost of several French casualties, including the death of Lieutenant Coste of the 1st Foreign Regiment.

During the operations immediately following the battle, French forces captured the official tribal flag of the Ait Seghrouchen on April 16, 1908, representing a major political blow to the local anti-colonial resistance. Armed encounters continued across the frontier until the formal establishment of the French protectorate via the Treaty of Fez in 1912.

== See also ==
- Battle of El-Moungar
- Battle of Taghit
- History of the French Foreign Legion
