= Iznasen Berber =

Berber variety of Morocco

Iznasen
- Beni Iznasen, Taznasit
- Tmaziɣt
- Native to: Northeast Morocco
- Region: Beni Snassen
- Native speakers: 100,000 (2013)
- Language family: Afro-Asiatic: Berber; Northern Berber; Zenati; Iznasen

Language codes
- ISO 639-3: None (mis)
- Glottolog: beni1249
- ELP: Beni Iznassen
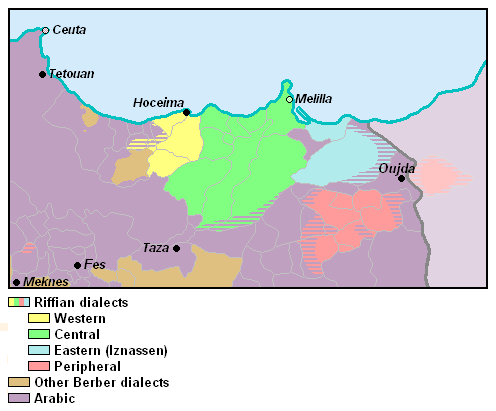

Iznasen (native name: Tmaziɣt), also known as Beni Iznasen or Taznasit, is a Berber variety, belonging to the Zenati group. It is spoken by the Beni Snassen in the extreme northeast of Morocco near the border of western Algeria, west of which lies the Tarifit-speaking area.
