= Ait Seghrouchen =

Berber tribe

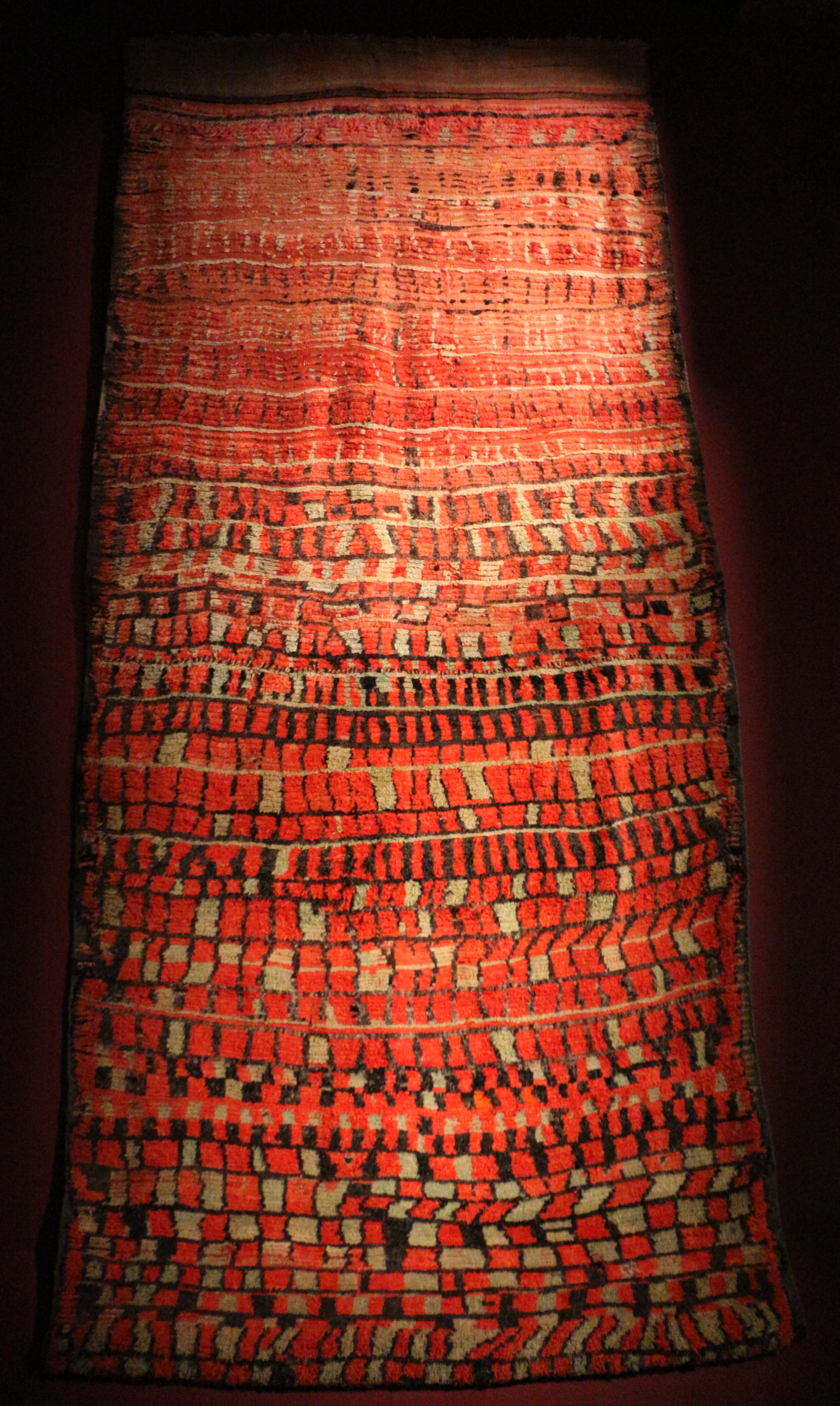
Ait Seghrouchen carpet

The Ait Seghrouchen (Standard Moroccan Tamazight: ⴰⵢⵜ ⵙⵖⵔⵓⵛⵛⵏ, romanized: Ayt Seɣruccen) are a Berber tribe of east-central Morocco. They are divided into two geographically separated groups, one on the south side of the Middle Atlas and one on the north side of the High Atlas. They speak a Zenati Berber dialect, Ait Seghrouchen Berber, sometimes grouped with Central Atlas Tamazight.

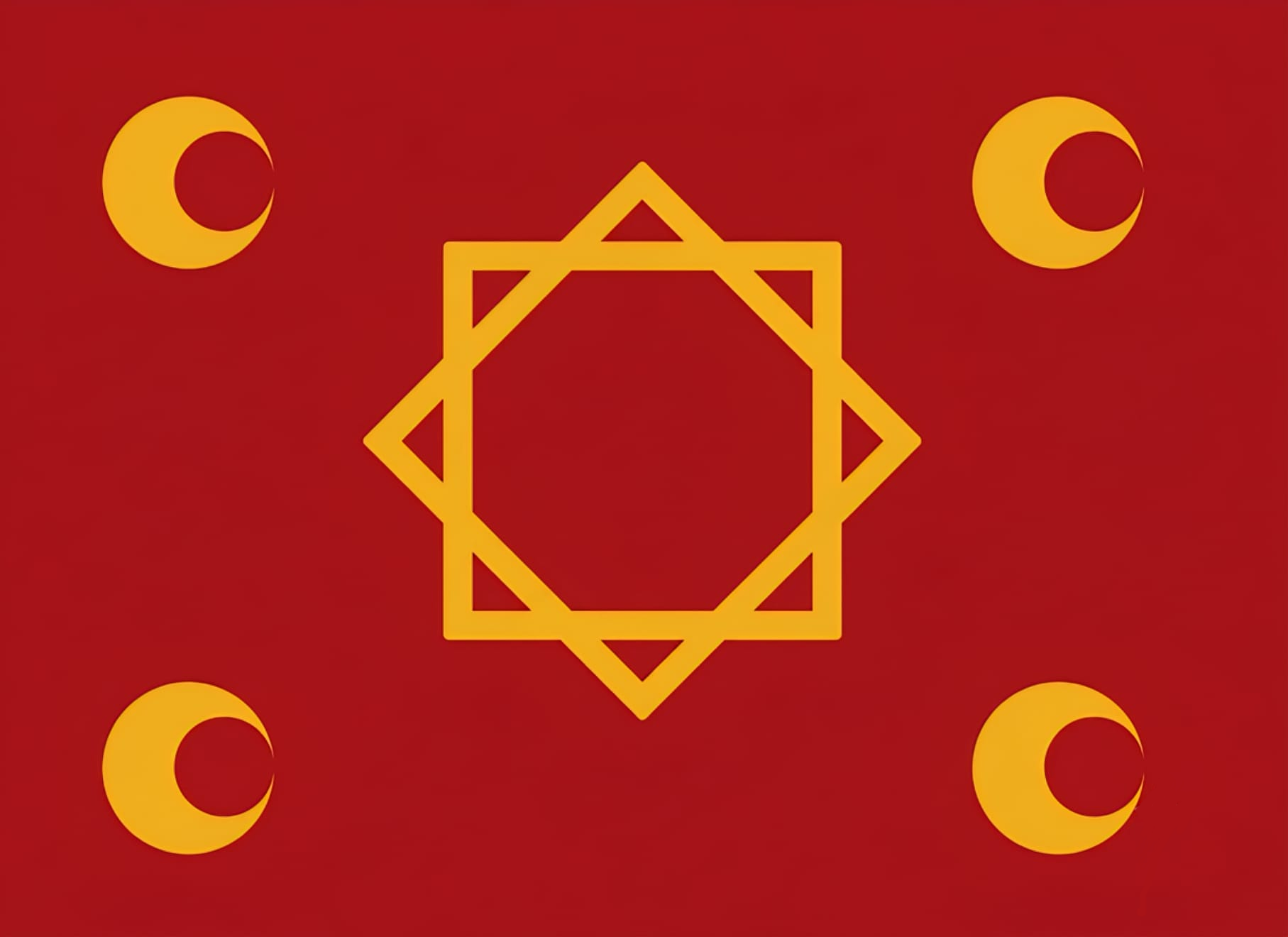
Tribe flag of the Ait Seghrouchen, captured by the French in 1908, 16 April against H’mad Oulahcen Seghrouchni resistance in the aftermath of the Battle of Menabha

== Etymology ==
The tribe gets its name from its patron saint, Sidi Ali ou Yahya, who "had petrified (seghr) the jackal (ushen)".

== Subdivisions ==
The Ait Seghrouchen are divided into 3 major sub-tribes:

- Ait Seghrouchen of Sidi Ali also known as Ait Seghrouchen of Tichikout
- Ait Seghrouchen of Imouzzer
- Ait Seghrouchen of Talesinnt
