= Sened language =

Extinct East Zenati Berber language of Tunisia

Sened
- Native to: Tunisia
- Region: Sened and Tmagourt
- Extinct: 1990
- Language family: Afro-Asiatic: Berber; Northern; Zenati; East; Sened
- Dialects: Sened proper; Tmagourt

Language codes
- ISO 639-3: sds
- Glottolog: sene1271
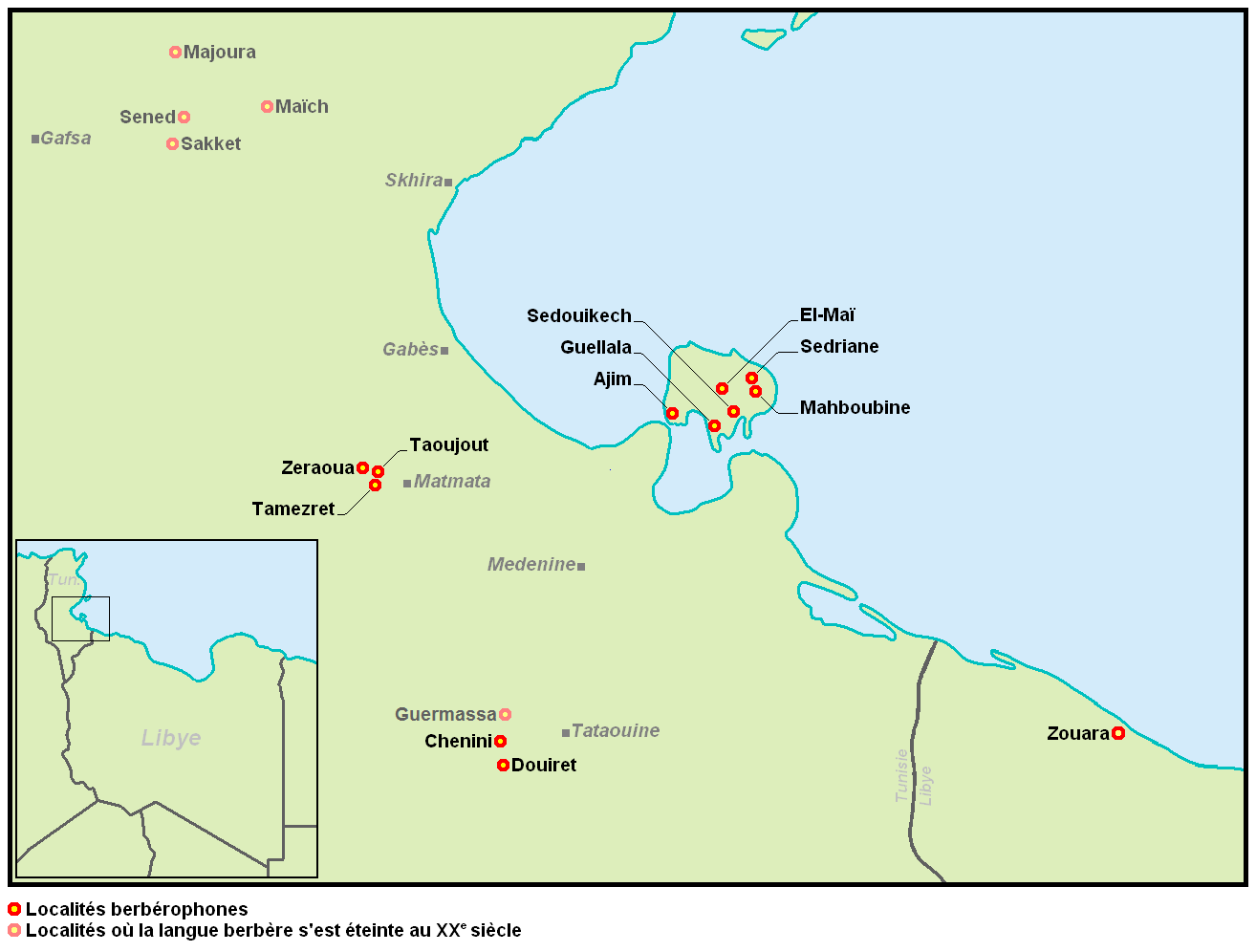
- Berber-speaking areas belonging to the Tunisia-Zuwara dialectal group

Sened is an extinct East Zenati Berber language that was spoken in the nearby towns of Sened and Majoura (Berber Tmagurt) in southern Tunisia until the mid-20th century. In 1911, the whole town of Sened spoke Berber; by 1968, only the elderly did.

== Sample ==
From a section translated from the epic Taghribat Bani Hilal, detailing the incursion of the Banu Hilal, in Provotelle's Etude sur la Tamazir't ou Zenatia de Qalaât Es-sned (Tunisie) (1911). The Arabic and French transcriptions of the text are reproduced unchanged; in the latter, r' represents a voiced uvular fricative, kh a voiceless uvular fricative, ch represents English sh, ou represents /u/ or /w/, i represents /i/ or /j/, and e represents schwa.

El Oukhti Diab Elalalia ienr'a Khlifa Ezzenati ill-is R'ida tenni zenneg n ezzimmel n ebboïs. Oumman {El Alali}, teskerkoust tenr'it-etch. Aou ienni zenneg n ezziml-is. Ienni Diab zenneg n ezziml-is, ious-es bâch aïenr'it.
When Diab El Hilali killed Khlifa Ezzenati, daughter-his Ghida rode top of horse of father-her. Said-they the-Hilalis, you-have-lied you-killed-him-not. Here-he-is rides top of horse-his. Rode Diab top of horse-his, goes to kill-her.
When Diab El Hilali killed Khlifa Ezzenati, his daughter Ghida got on her father's horse. The Hilalis said "You lied; you didn't kill him!. There he is riding his horse." Diab mounted his horse and went forth to kill her.
