= Sened, Tunisia =

Town in Tunisia

Coordinates: 34°28′N 9°16′E

Sened (Arabic: السند As Sanad) is a commune and small town in central Tunisia in Gafsa Governorate, and is also the name of the extinct Berber language (Sened) that was spoken there and at the nearby town of Tmagourt until the mid-twentieth century. At the 2014 census it had a population of 9,581. In 1911, the whole town spoke Berber; by 1968, only the elderly did.

== Population ==
2014 Census (Municipal)
Homes	Families	Males	Females	Total
2541	2142	4663	4870	9533
