= Edmond Destaing =

French orientalist

- Born: 19 January 1872; Roset-Fluans (Doubs)
- Died: 27 December 1940 (aged 68); L'Haÿ-les-Roses
- Occupations: Scholar; Orientalist

Edmond Destaing (19 January 1872 – 27 December 1940) was a French orientalist Arabist, Berberologist, and first holder of the Chair of Berber at the Institut national des langues et civilisations orientales.

== Biography ==
Destaing, initially a teacher in Doubs, moved to Algiers in order to follow the course of the Normal school of Bouzaréah. He taught at the Franco-native school of rue Montpensier from 1894. He served as Professor of Natural Sciences and Geography at the Médersa de Tlemcen under the direction of William Marçais and Alfred Bel (1902-1907), concentrating (beginning 1905) on the study of the Beni Snous dialect at the Moroccan border. His resulting translation dictionary is still a work of reference.

Appointed director of the newly created Médersa at Saint-Louis, Senegal in 1907, he took the direction of the Médersa of Algiers in succession to William Marçais in 1910. In 1914, he was assigned the Berber Chair created at the École des Langues Orientales. From 1921, he also taught Maghreb Arabic at the École nationale de la France d'outre-mer. Having contracted malaria in Algeria, he died on 27 December 1940 at his home in L'Haÿ-les-Roses.

== Works ==
- 1907: Etude sur le dialecte berbère des Beni-Snous. Paris, E. Leroux
- 1914: Dictionnaire français-berbère, dialecte des Beni Snous. Paris, Leroux]
