= Beni Snassen =

Berber tribe of Morocco

Beni Snassen Taznasit: ⴰⵜ ⵉⵣⵏⴰⵙⵏ, romanized: At Iznasn
- tribal federation
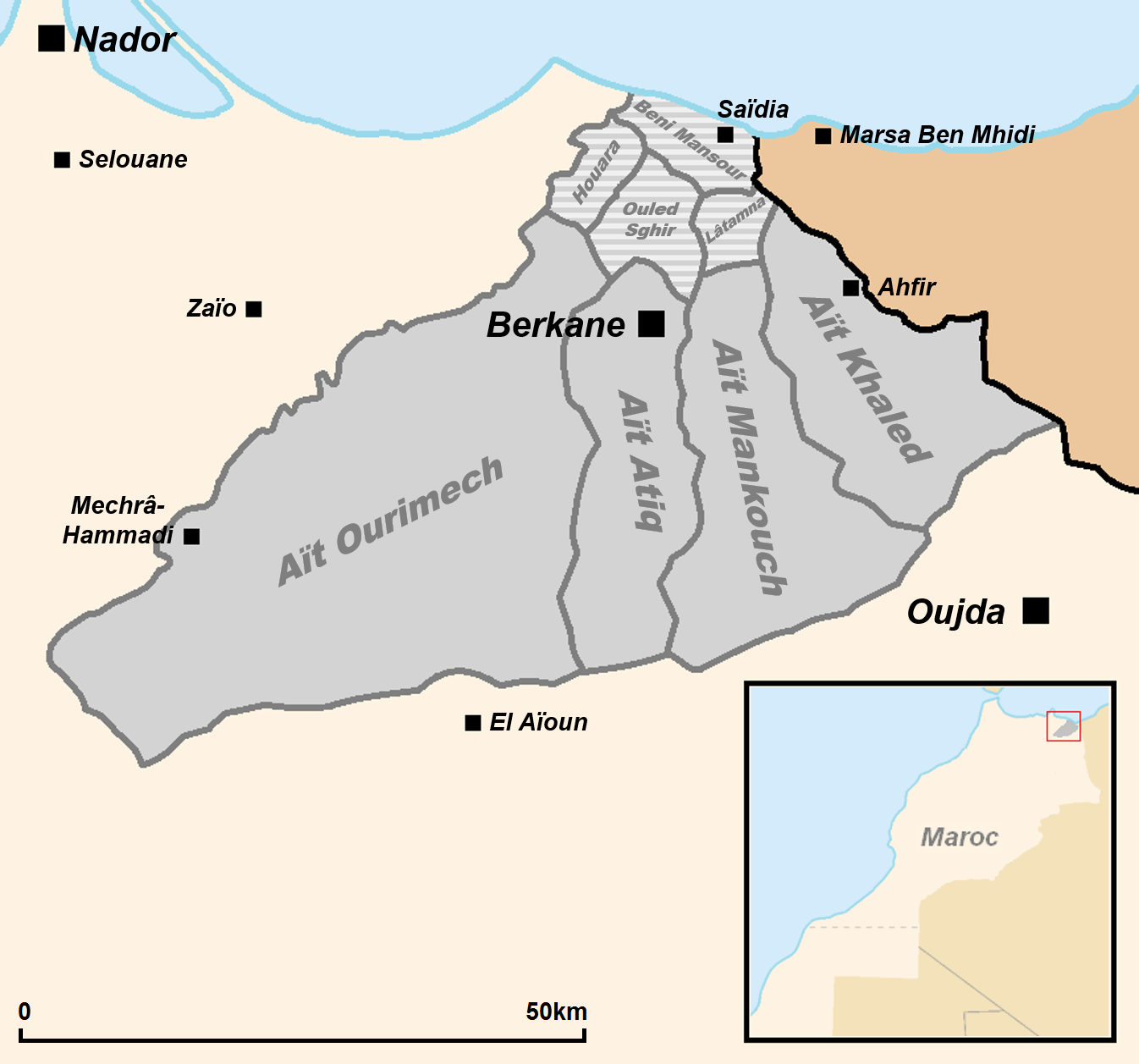
- Tribal map of the Beni Iznasen. The Triffa are highlighted north
- Ethnicity: Amazigh
- Location: Oriental (Morocco)
- Parent tribe: Zenata
- Language: Taznasit, Eastern Morocco Arabic
- Religion: Sunni Islam

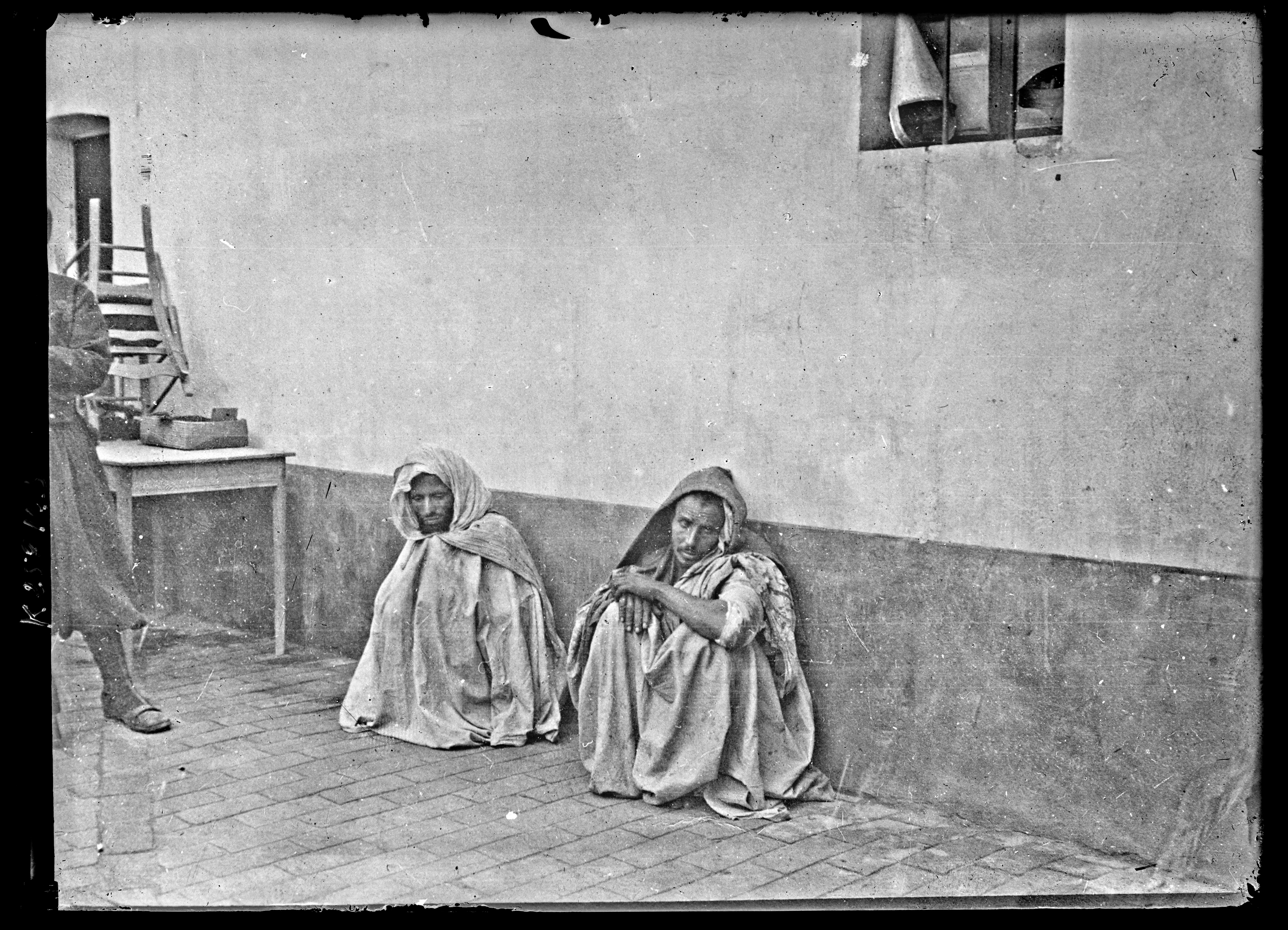
Prisoners from the Beni Snassen c. 1907

The Beni Snassen, also known as Ait Iznassen (Arabic: بني يزناسن; Taznasit: ⴰⵜ ⵉⵣⵏⴰⵙⵏ, romanized: At Iznasn), are a Zenata Berber tribe with Arab factions inhabiting northeastern Morocco, near the border with Algeria.

== Etymology ==
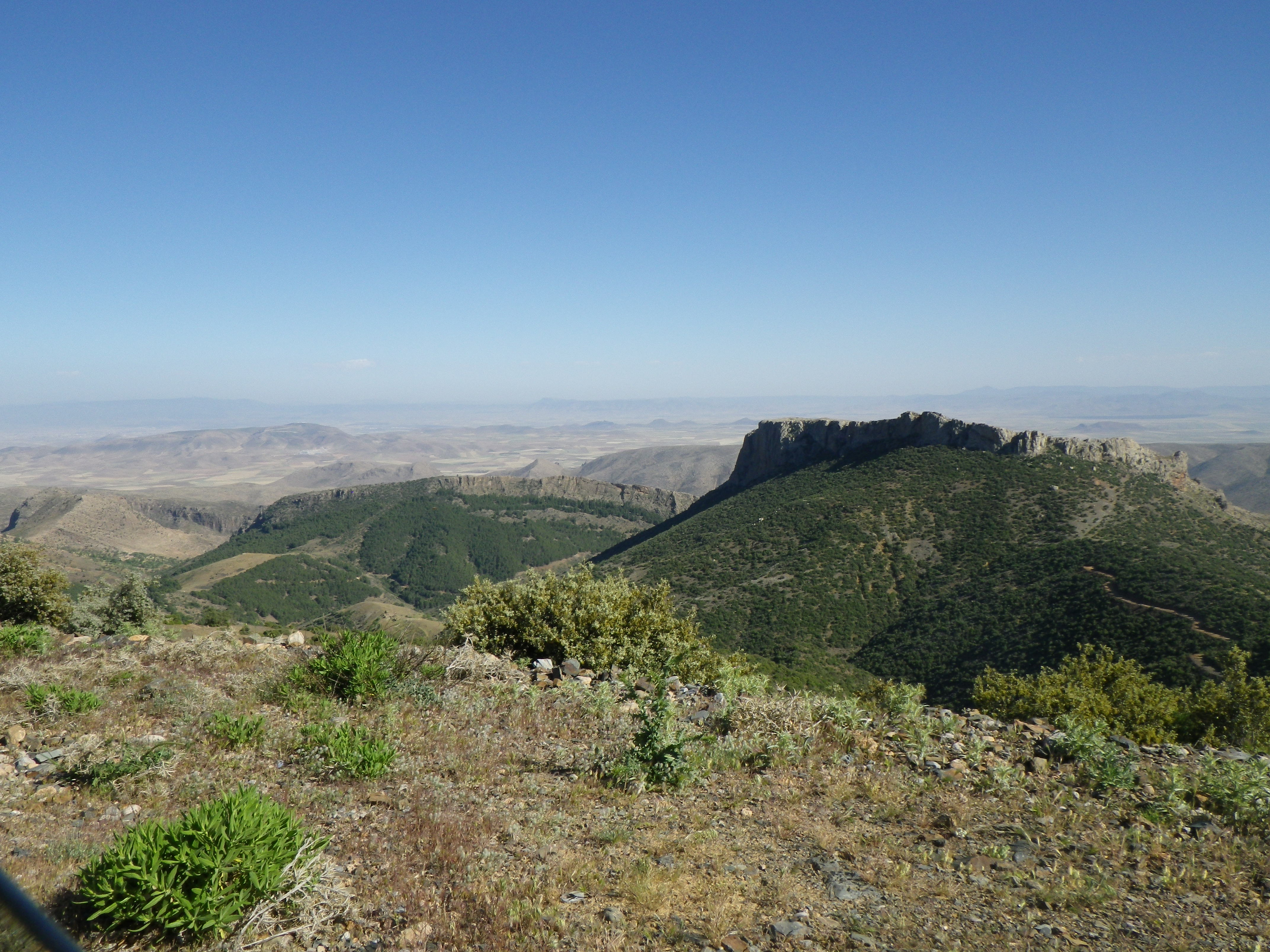
Landscape of the Beni Snassen region

The Berber linguist Salem Chaker notes that the name "Iznasn" follows a general onomastic model where a verbal or nominal segment is followed by a personal affix. In this case, the affix is "-sn" which means "their, to them". However, the meaning of the first element "izna", which could be a verb of the root *ZN (?) or a noun, is unknown.

== History ==
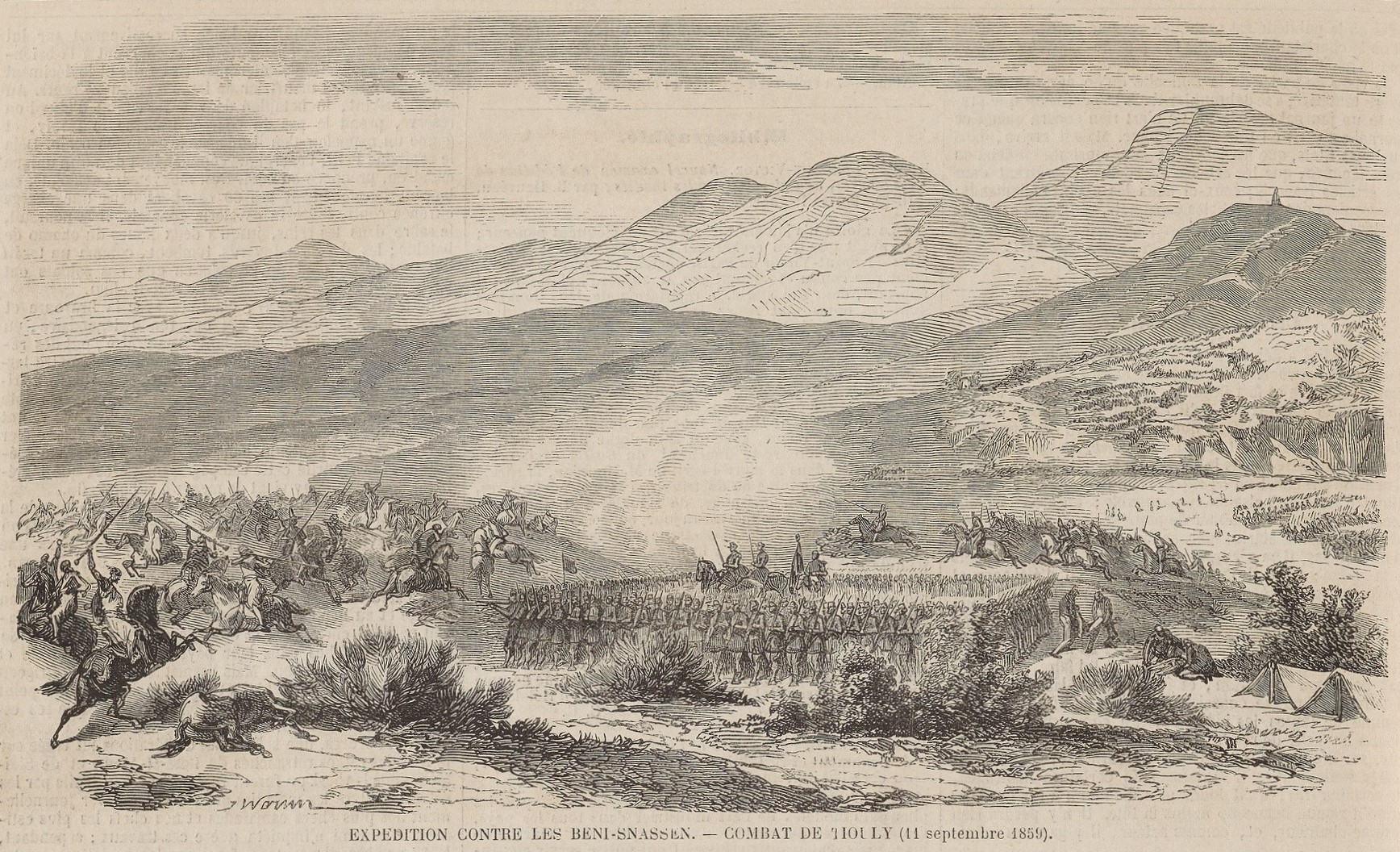
Expedition against the Beni-Snassen (Combat of Tiouly), 11 September 1859

The Beni Snassen were among the first Moroccan tribal groups to encounter the French. In the 1840s, they fought alongside Emir Abdelkader against the French and looted the camp of the routed Moroccan forces after their defeat at the battle of Isly. In May 1844, after a French column, camped on Beni Snassen crop land near the shrine of Lalla Maghnia, they complained to Abid commander Ali ibn al-Tayyib al-Gnawi. The Abid forces in Oujda commanded by Ali al-Gnawi, supported by Beni Snassen auxiliaries, drove the French back from their camp to Oujda.

On 23 November 1908, the Beni Snassen led a jihad against French posts near Oujda. They were initially successful, but after a series of political and military manoeuvres, they sued for peace with the French in January 1909. Prior to this, they continuously raided into Algeria.

The historian Edmund Burke III notes that this insurrection is significant in two ways. First, by validating the success of Hubert Lyautey's pacification tactics, it encouraged the French government to replace General Drude. Second, although local in character, the uprising was part of a broader movement across Morocco in support of Abd al-Hafid of Morocco. Burke adds that it was likely sparked by the success of Hafidist military leader Muhammad ibn al-Rashid in Chaouia.

== Subdivisions ==
According to the French colonial-era scholar Amédé Renisio, the tribe is made up of four main subgroups:

- At Khaled (Bani Khaled)
- At Menquš (Bani Mangouche)
- At Aḥtiq (Bani Atike)
- At Urimmeš (Bani Ourimeche)

There is also an Arab faction, called the Triffa, made up of the Ouled Sghir, Laatamna, Hawara, and Ouled Mansour.

== Language ==
The Beni Snassen are traditionally bilingual. Some factions are Arabic-speaking while others speak Iznasen Berber. In recent decades, language shift is taking place at least in parts of the region, and appears to be complete in larger urban centers such as Berkane.

According to a study by the academic Yasmina El Kirat, the Beni Snassen are increasingly abandoning Iznasen Berber in favour of Moroccan Arabic. El Kirat claims they have "developed a very negative attitude towards their mother tongue to the extent of rejecting it" and "consider their language a stigma," viewing Moroccan Arabic as more useful.

Despite this trend, Berber is still spoken by entire communities in many villages, including children and adolescents. The language has approximately 100,000 speakers. The linguist Maarten Kossmann argues that, considering this, El Kirat's view may be too pessimistic.
