= Zuwarah =

Zuwara Berber languages: ⴰⵣⵡⴰⵔ
- City
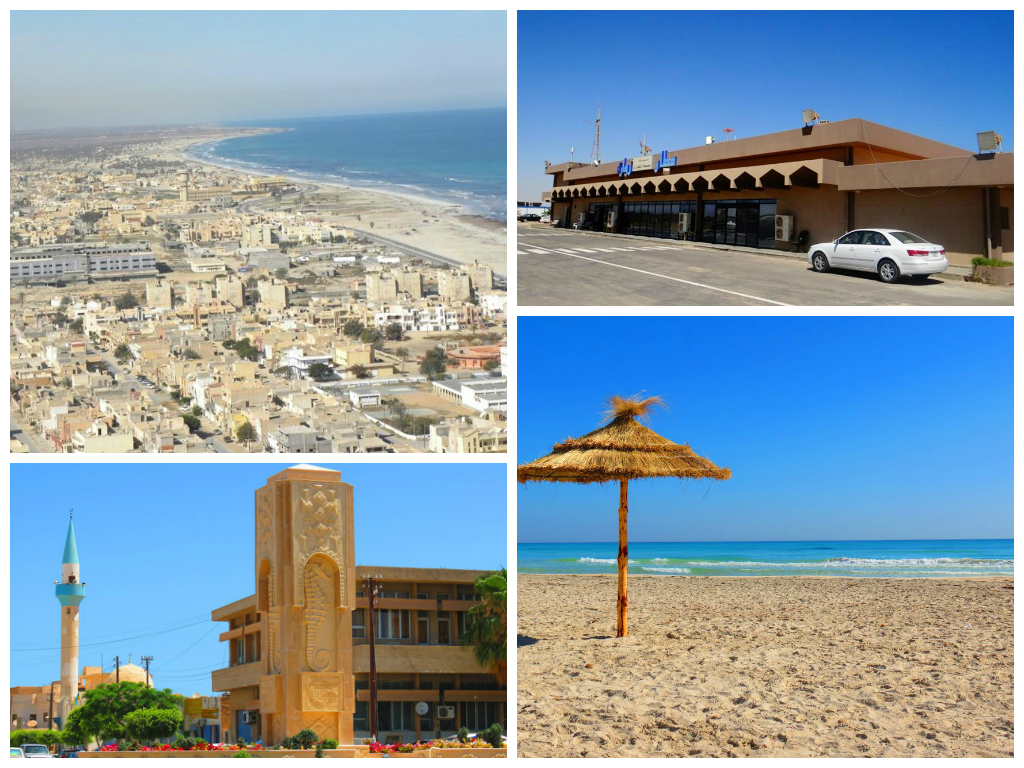

- Seal
- Nickname: ⴰⵜ ⵡⵉⵍⵍⵓⵍ
- Location in Libya
- Coordinates: 32°56′N 12°05′E
- Country: Libya
- Region: Tripolitania
- Elevation: 0 ft (0 m)

Population
  - Total: 55,893
- Time zone: UTC+2 (EET)
- License Plate Code: 9

Zuwarah, Zuwara, or Zwara (Arabic: زوارة; Berber languages: ⴰⵣⵡⴰⵔ) is a coastal city in north-western Libya.

Zuwara is primarily inhabited by indigenous Berber people of Libya. The local Berber dialect, known locally as Awal m at-willul, is commonly spoken as a first language by the inhabitants of Zuwara.

Zuwara is famous for its beaches and seafood. It is situated 102 km (63 mi) west of Tripoli and 60 km (37 mi) from the Tunisian border. It is the capital of the Nuqat al Khams district. Zuwarah consists of 49 districts.

== History ==
The settlement was first mentioned by the traveller Abdallah al-Tijani in the years 1306-1309 as composed of two parts: Zwara al-soughra ("Little Zwarah") and Zwara al-koubra ("Greater Zwarah"). In the Catalan Atlas (1375) it was called as Punta dar Zoyara. The town is mentioned by Leo Africanus in the 16th century. It later served as the western outpost of Italian Libya (1912–43), being the terminus of the now-defunct Italian Libya Railway from Tripoli 105 kilometres (65 mi) to the east. Its artificial harbour shelters a motorized fishing fleet. Cereals, dates, and esparto grass (used to make cordage, shoes, and paper) are local products.

It was in 1973 in Zuwara that Muammar Gaddafi first proclaimed the Libyan "Cultural Revolution".

=== 2011 Libyan civil war ===
During the 2011 Libyan Civil War, the city was reported by Al Jazeera to be under control of the local anti-Gaddafi forces on 23 February 2011, and lost by the government of Muammar Gaddafi. Thousands of anti-government protesters, gathered in the Zuwara town square on 24 February, repulsed another Libyan Army attempt to retake the city. Loyalist forces used the pro-government towns of Jumayl and Riqdalin to the south as bases for their attacks on the city. However, from March onwards, the city was under the control of loyalist forces. Amidst the August rebel coastal offensive, rebels took Zuwara on 18 August.

In September 2011, and following the fall of the Gaddafi government, Zuwara was the first City in Libya to democratically elect its local council.

== Economy ==
The city's Port of Zwara is used as a transfer point for smuggled fuel by the militias who fight the government. Often these vessels fly the flag of Palau and are operated from a mailbox in the Marshall Islands.

== Climate ==
Zuwara has a hot desert climate (Köppen climate classification BWh).

Climate data for Zuwarah (1991–2020)
Month	Jan	Feb	Mar	Apr	May	Jun	Jul	Aug	Sep	Oct	Nov	Dec	Year
Record high °C (°F)	31.8 (89.2)	36.5 (97.7)	39.2 (102.6)	41.2 (106.2)	47.0 (116.6)	50.2 (122.4)	47.0 (116.6)	47.0 (116.6)	46.0 (114.8)	43.8 (110.8)	39.0 (102.2)	32.5 (90.5)	50.2 (122.4)
Mean daily maximum °C (°F)	18.3 (64.9)	19.3 (66.7)	21.1 (70.0)	23.2 (73.8)	26.1 (79.0)	28.5 (83.3)	30.9 (87.6)	32.3 (90.1)	30.7 (87.3)	28.6 (83.5)	24.2 (75.6)	19.8 (67.6)	25.3 (77.5)
Daily mean °C (°F)	13.7 (56.7)	14.6 (58.3)	16.6 (61.9)	19.0 (66.2)	22.0 (71.6)	24.9 (76.8)	27.6 (81.7)	28.6 (83.5)	27.2 (81.0)	24.2 (75.6)	19.1 (66.4)	15.0 (59.0)	21.0 (69.8)
Mean daily minimum °C (°F)	9.0 (48.2)	9.8 (49.6)	12.1 (53.8)	14.8 (58.6)	18.0 (64.4)	21.3 (70.3)	24.1 (75.4)	24.9 (76.8)	23.8 (74.8)	19.8 (67.6)	14.1 (57.4)	10.1 (50.2)	16.8 (62.2)
Record low °C (°F)	2.5 (36.5)	1.0 (33.8)	4.0 (39.2)	6.8 (44.2)	9.5 (49.1)	14.0 (57.2)	18.0 (64.4)	16.0 (60.8)	16.0 (60.8)	10.8 (51.4)	4.0 (39.2)	3.5 (38.3)	1.0 (33.8)
Average precipitation mm (inches)	33.1 (1.30)	27.6 (1.09)	15.5 (0.61)	9.6 (0.38)	4.6 (0.18)	0.8 (0.03)	0.0 (0.0)	1.7 (0.07)	16.6 (0.65)	22.0 (0.87)	30.2 (1.19)	43.2 (1.70)	204.9 (8.07)
Average precipitation days (≥ 1 mm)	4.1	3.5	2.5	1.4	0.9	0.3	0.0	0.3	1.5	2.5	3.5	5.5	26.0
Source: NOAA

== See also ==
- List of cities in Libya
- Zuwara Berber
- Dania Ben Sassi
