= Rainer Vossen =

German linguist

- Born: Rainer Voßen; 6 December 1951 (age 74); Düsseldorf, Germany
- Occupation: Linguist

Academic background
- Education: University of Cologne

Academic work
- Institutions: Goethe University Frankfurt
- Main interests: Languages of Africa

Rainer Vossen (German: Rainer Voßen; born 6 December 1951 in Düsseldorf, Germany) is a German linguist and Africanist. His research interests include the historical linguistics of Nilotic languages and Khoisan languages.

== Biography ==
From 1972 to 1982, Vossen studied African studies, ethnology, history, and prehistory at the University of Cologne. After receiving his doctorate in 1982 from the University of Cologne, he served as an academic advisor for the Chair of African Studies II at the University of Bayreuth from 1984 to 1990. After completing his habilitation in 1990, he was a lecturer at the University of Bayreuth from 1990 to 1992. In 1993, he became Professor of African Languages and Linguistics at Goethe University.

== Selected publications ==
Selected publications by Rainer Vossen:

- The eastern Nilotes. Linguistic and historical reconstructions. Berlin 1982, ISBN 3-496-00698-6.
- Towards a comparative study of the Maa dialects of Kenya and Tanzania. Hamburg 1988, ISBN 3-87118-852-2.
- Patterns of language knowledge and language use in Ngamiland, Botswana. Bayreuth 1988, OCLC 220974437.
- Die Khoe-Sprachen. Ein Beitrag zur Erforschung der Sprachgeschichte Afrikas. Köln 1997, ISBN 3-927620-59-9.
- The Khoesan Languages. Editor. Routledge Language Family Series, 2013.
