= Maarten Kossmann =

Linguist (b. 1966)

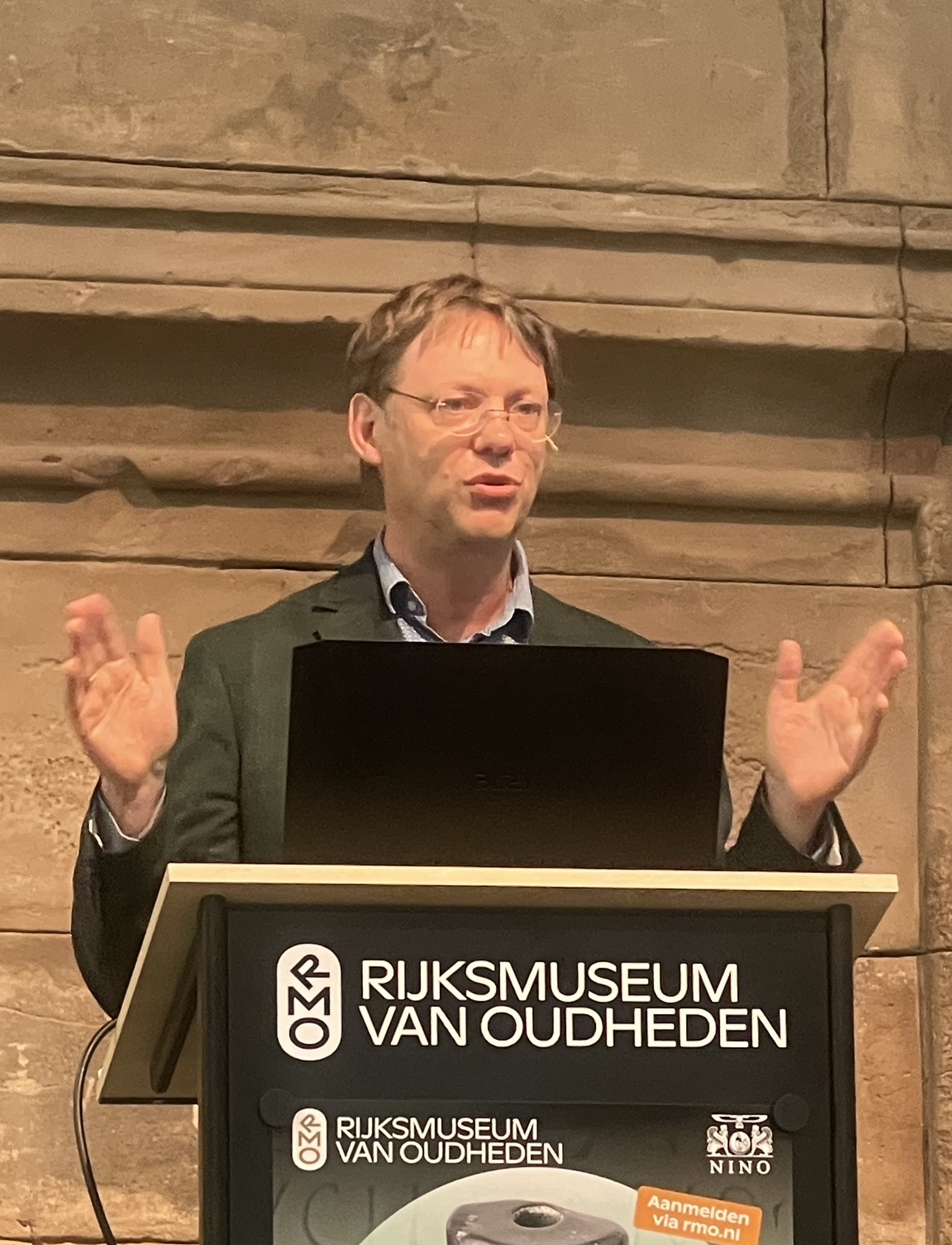
- Born: 5 February 1966 (age 60); Zuidlaren, Netherlands

Academic background
- Education: Leiden University

Academic work
- Discipline: Linguist
- Sub-discipline: Berber languages; Language contact
- Institutions: Leiden University

Maarten Kossmann (born 5 February 1966 in Zuidlaren, Netherlands) is a Dutch linguist who specializes in Berber languages. He is currently professor of Berber studies at Leiden University.

== Bibliography ==
=== Books ===
- Boutkan, D.; Kossmann, M. (1996). Het stadsdialekt van Tilburg: klank- en vormleer. Cahiers van het P. J. Meertens-Instituut. Amsterdam: P.J. Meertens-Inst. voor Dialectologie, Volkskunde en Naamkunde. ISBN 978-90-70389-51-2.
- Kossmann, M. (1997). Grammaire du parler berbère de Figuig: Maroc oriental. M.S., Ussun amazigh (in French). Paris: Peeters. ISBN 978-2-87723-302-6. (= PhD, Leiden 1994)
- Bezzazi, A.; Kossmann, M. (1997). Berber sprookjes uit Noord-Marokko (in Dutch). Uitgeverij Bulaaq. ISBN 978-90-5460-018-3.
- Kossmann, M. (1999). Essai sur la phonologie du proto-berbère (in French). Köppe. ISBN 978-3-89645-035-7.
- Kossmann, M. (2000). Esquisse grammaticale du rifain oriental (in French). Peeters Publishers. ISBN 978-90-429-0892-5.
- Kossmann, M. (2000). A Study of Eastern Moroccan Fairy Tales. Suomalainen Tiedeakatemia. ISBN 978-951-41-0880-8.
- Kossmann, M. (2004). De menseneetster: Berber sprookjes uit de Rif (in Dutch). Bulaaq. ISBN 978-90-5460-066-4.
- Kossmann, M. (2005). Berber loanwords in Hausa. Berber studies. Köln: Köppe. ISBN 978-3-89645-391-4.
- Kossmann, M. (2011). A Grammar of Ayer Tuareg (Niger). Köppe. ISBN 978-3-89645-930-5.
- Kossmann, M. (2013). A Grammatical Sketch of Ghadames Berber (Libya). Köppe. ISBN 978-3-89645-940-4.
- Kossmann, M. (2013). The Arabic Influence on Northern Berber. BRILL. ISBN 978-90-04-25309-4.
- Kossmann, M. (2019). An Introduction to Tarifiyt Berber (Nador, Morocco). Ugarit-Verlag. ISBN 978-3-86835-307-5.

=== Articles in books and journals ===
- Kossmann, M. (2010). "Parallel System Borrowing: Parallel morphological systems due to the borrowing of paradigms". Diachronica. 27 (3): 459–488. doi:10.1075/dia.27.3.03kos. ISSN 0176-4225.
- Kossmann, M. (2014). "On substratum: The history of the focus marker d in Jijel Arabic (Algeria)". In Féral, Carole de; Kossmann, Maarten G.; Tosco, Mauro (eds.). In and out of Africa: languages in question in honour of Robert Nicolaï. Bibliothèque des cahiers de l'Institut de linguistique de Louvain. Leuven: Peeters. ISBN 978-90-429-2927-2.
