= Northern Berber languages =

Afro-Asiatic dialect continuum

Northern Berber
- Geographic distribution: Northwest Africa
- Linguistic classification: Afroasiatic: Berber; Northern Berber
- Subdivisions: Kabyle; Atlas; Zenati; Standard Algerian; Standard Moroccan; ? Numidian †

Language codes
- Glottolog: kaby1244 Kabyle–Atlas Berber zena1250 Zenatic

The Northern Berber languages are a dialect continuum spoken across the Maghreb, constituting a subgroup of the Berber branch of the Afroasiatic language family. Their continuity has been broken by the spread of Arabic, and to a lesser extent by the Zenati group within Northern Berber. The Zenati idioms share certain innovations not found in the surrounding languages; notably a softening of k to sh and an absence of a- in certain words, such as "hand" (afus vs. fus.)

== Language contact and areal features ==
The Northern Berber languages exhibit areal features, shared elements that come from language contact with an unrelated language rather than coming from a shared ancestor language. For Northern Berber languages, Arabic exerts a large influence, especially on the sound patterns of the languages.

Most Northern Berber languages have adopted the pharnygeal fricatives [ʕ] and [ħ], as well as a few other phonemes from Arabic. In general, the language contact is asymmetric; Arabic features are more likely to be adopted by the Berber languages than vice versa, because Arabic is more widely spoken.

== Members of the continuum ==
The Berber languages represent a continuum, and drawing clear boundaries between them is complicated, with linguists still disagreeing on optimal analysis of the relationships between the languages/dialects. Maarten Kossmann proposes a four-way distinction among the Berber languages, where the term "Northern Berber languages" refers to all Berber languages that are not members of the Zenaga, Tetserret, or Tuareg groups. Under this definition, the Northern Berber languages have a geographic range across Northern Africa, from the Moroccan coastline all the way east to the Siwa Oasis in Egypt.

Northern Berber languages are spoken by millions of people. The Group includes vital languages like Shilha, Central Morocco Tamazight, Riff, Shawiya and Kabyle. They are typically clustered into three groups:

- Moroccan Atlas languages (incl. Shilha, Central Morocco Tamazight)
- Zenati languages (incl. Riff, Shawiya)
- Kabyle

The eastern boundaries of the North Berber varieties are uncertain. Some linguists include the Nafusi and Ghadamès languages, while others do not. Most regard Ghadamès as lying outside of Northern Berber, but Ethnologue does not.

There is no authoritative answer as to whether the Northern Berber varieties constitute languages rather than dialects. Some academics believe that not only Northern Berber but all the Berber languages are dialects of a single language, whereas others come up with much higher counts. At any rate, mutual comprehensibility among the Northern Berber varieties is high, though not perfect, and mutual influence between the varieties prevents clear-cut boundaries from being drawn.

Comparative linguistic analysis suggests that if the poorly attested Numidian language was a part of the Berber language family, then it would have likely been a part of the Northern Berber languages, part of a dialect continuum speaking the early form of this language group.
