= Ghardaïa Province =

Province of Algeria

Ghardaïa Province ولاية غرداية
- Province
- Map of Algeria highlighting Ghardaïa
- Coordinates: 32°29′N 3°40′E
- Country: Algeria
- Date created: 1984
- Capital: Ghardaïa

Government
  - PPA president: Mr. Hadj Said Sulaiman
  - Wāli: Mr. Abi Nawar Abdullah

Area
  - Total: 21,224.03 km^{2} (8,194.64 sq mi)

Population (2020)
  - Total: 391,671
  - Density: 18.4541/km^{2} (47.7960/sq mi)
- Time zone: UTC+01 (CET)
- Area Code: +213 (0) 29
- ISO 3166 code: DZ-47
- Districts: 7
- Municipalities: 9
- Website: Wilayadeghardaia.org

Ghardaïa (Arabic: ولاية غرداية) is an Algerian province located in the north of the Algerian desert. Its administrative center is the city of Ghardaia, located 600 km (370 mi) south of the capital Algiers. Its total area is estimated at 21,224.03 km^{2} (8,194.64 mi^{2}), 138 km (86 mi) from north to south, and 200 to 250 km (120 to 160 mi) from east to west. It rises 486 m (1,594 ft) above sea level.

== Geographical location ==
The province is bordered by the province of Djelfa and the province of Laghouat to the north, the province of El Menia in the south, the province of Ouargla to the east and the province of El Bayadh in the west.

The city of Ghardaia, the capital of the province, is 200 km (120 mi) from Laghouat, 200 km from Ouargla, 270 km (170 mi) from El Menia and 430 km (270 mi) from El Bayadh, and is crossed by the national road No. 1 linking the Algerian capital to the Great South.

== Climate ==
Since the state is located in desert areas, the climate of the region is arid desert, the temperature range is wide between day and night, and between winter and summer; the winter temperature ranges between 1 and 25 °C (34 and 77 °F), and between 18 and 48 °C (64 and 118 °F) in summer. The weather is fair in spring and autumn, and the sky is clear most days of the year.

The average rainfall in the state is about 60 mm (2.4 in) annually, mostly in the winter season. How much cold northwesterly winds blow in the winter and south-westerly winds laden with sand in the spring and in the summer a hot south known as Sirocco.

== History ==
c.1100 - Town of Ghardaïa is founded by the Mozabites, Amazigh Muslims of the Ibadi sect.

1984 - The Ghardaïa province was carved out of Laghouat Province.

2015 - Violence causing the death of over 20 citizens as a result of ethnic tension between "Bani Mzab and Arab Bedouin from various branches of the Chaamba tribe".

"Aghlan" is the name the Beni Mzab have given to their region. Its geographical borders are as follows: Oued Bouzbyar in the North, Oued Zergoun in the west. The Mzab includes Zelfana and Guerrara in the east and is merged to the region of Chaamba in the south. The area is approximately 38,000 km^{2} (15,000 mi^{2}).

During the 8th century AD, 2nd century Hegira (according to Cheikh Abi Ishak Tfyeche) thé Beni Mzab settled on the banks of the oued or Valley to which they gave their name. The first inhabitants of the area had been nomadic or semi-nomadic. Many old small built-up areas, fallen into ruins long time ago, can be counted: in nearby al Atteuf we mention Agharm Netlazdit, Oukheira, and Aoulaoual, Tmazzert once existed near Bounoura and Agharm Enwadday has preceded the present city of Melika. Not far from Tafilalt were the towns of Mourki. Tirichine, Tlet Moussa, Agnounay and Boukyaou.

The final settling process of Beni Mzab along with the emergency of the three following cities: El Atteuf, which was settled in 1012; Bounoura in 1065, Ghardaia settled in 1085; and more than two centuries later. In 1321, Tafilalt expanded and integrated the inhabitants of its neighboring villages and is named since then Beni Isgeun. In 1355, Melika succeed Agharm Enwadday. This way the Mzab pentapolis was born.

Three centuries later, in 1631, the town of Guerrara was founded 90 km (56 mi) northeast of the pentapolis and 60 years later the town of Berriane was founded 40 km (25 mi) north of the pentapolis.

Now and since the last administrative division (in 1984) the seven Mzabite towns have been reduced into five municipalities in the province of Ghardaia.

== Administrative divisions ==
The province is made up of 7 districts, which are divided into 9 communes or municipalities.

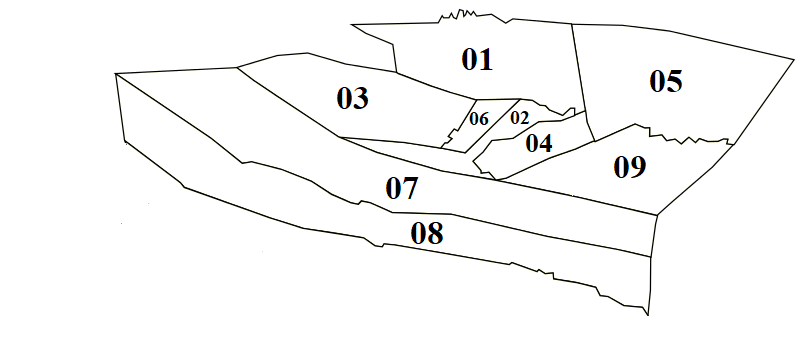
Municipalities of the state of Ghardaia

=== Districts ===
1. Métlili
2. Bounoura
3. Ghardaïa
4. Dhayet Bendhahoua
5. Zelfana
6. Bérianne
7. Igraren

=== Communes ===
1. At Bergane
2. At Bounour
3. Dhayet Bendhahoua
4. Tajnint
5. Igrarene
6. Taghrdait
7. Metlili
8. Sebseb
9. Zelfana
10. Mansoura

== The governors ==
The position of Wali of Ghardaia was held by many national political figures since its establishment on 4 February 1984 under Law No. 84-09 which reorganized the Algerian territories by increasing the number of provinces from 31 to 48.

Walis in the state of Ghardaia
Number	Wali	Beginning	End
01	Mohideen Charfi	04/02/1984	31/08/1985
02	Ahmed Hakimi	31/08/1985	26/07/1986
03	Mahmoud Si Youssef	26/07/1986	29/07/1990
04	Khaled Rugij	29/07/1990	21/08/1991
05	Khair Edinn Sharif	21/08/1991	11/07/1995
06	Mukhtar Othmani	11/07/1995	22/08/1999
07	Mahmoud Baazizi	22/08/1999	04/08/2001
08	Abdel Malek Boudiaf	04/08/2001	11/08/2005
09	Yahia Fahim	11/08/2005	30/09/2010
10	Ahmed Adli	30/09/2010	24/10/2013
11	Mahmoud Gomaa	24/10/2013	22/07/2015
12	Ezzedine Meshri	22/07/2015	26/06/2020
13	Boualem Omrani	26/06/2020	14/09/2022
14	Abi Nawar Abdullah	14/09/2022	Incumbent

== Transportation ==
=== Road transport ===
The state of Ghardaia is characterized by the presence of a road transport network, represented by a network of highways. In addition to that, there exists a huge fleet of large and small buses, yellow taxis, and others.

=== Air transport ===
Ghardaia Airport - Numirat Moufdi Zakaria (IATA: GHA, ICAO: DAUG) is an international airport located in the city of Ghardaia, and the airport was named after the Algerian poet Moufdi Zakaria.

== Ghardaia state road network ==
The state of Ghardaia is characterized by a wide road network that connects the regions of the state with each other, as well as the state of Ghardaia, with the neighboring states, as well as the highway (north-south).

=== National roads ===
- National Road No. 01 (North–South highway).
- National Road No. 49.
- National Road No. 107.

=== State roads ===
- State Road No. 33 The link between the municipality of Berriane and El Guerrara
- State Road No. 105 The link between the municipality of El Atteuf and the national road n ° 01
- State Road No. 105B Avoidance road to the municipality of El Atteuf
- State Road No. 106 The link between the municipality of Sebseb, via the municipality of Metlili, to the national road N° 01
- State Road No. 147 The link between the municipality of Dhayet Bendhahoua, passing through the municipality of Ghardaia and Bounoura, up to the national road No. 01
- State Road No. 201 The link between the municipality of Zelfana and El Guerrara
- State Road No. 347 The link between the municipality of El Guerrara and Guettara
