= André Ravéreau =

French architect and architectural historian

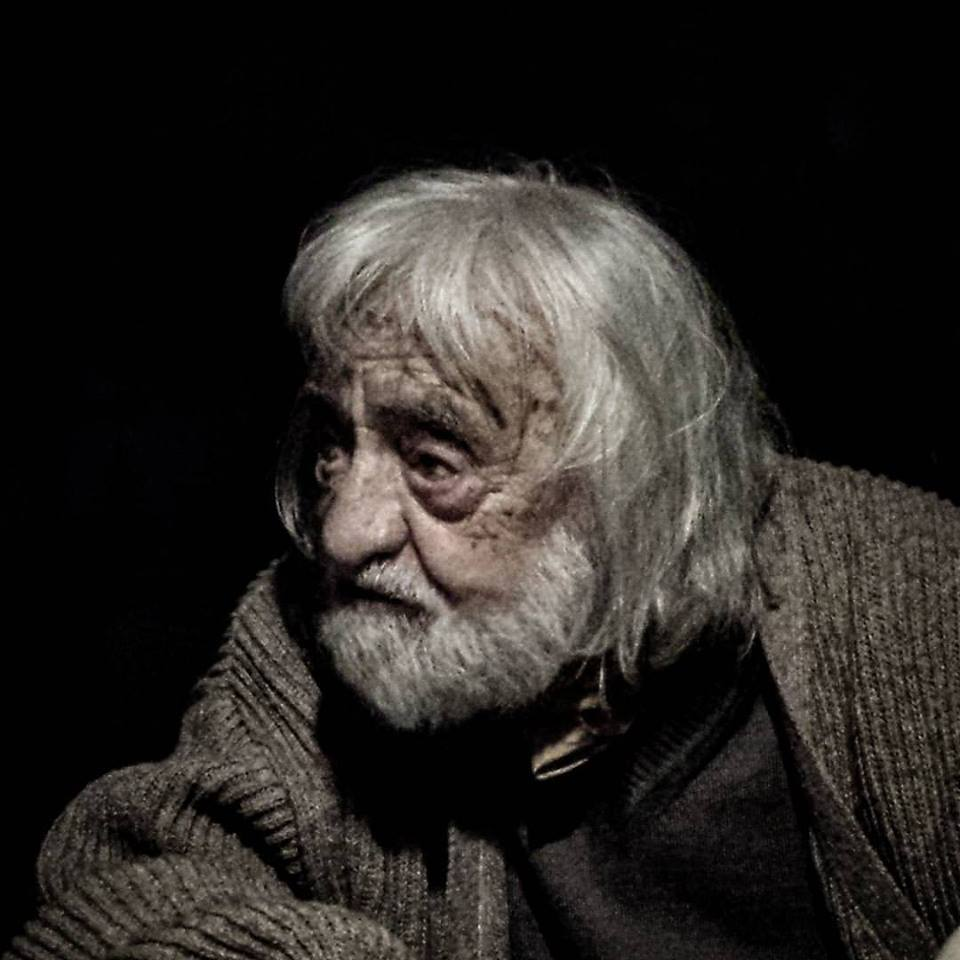
- Ravereau in 1917
- Born: André-Raymond-Marie Ravéreau; 29 July 1919; Limoges, Haute-Vienne, France
- Died: 12 October 2017 (aged 98); Aubenas, Ardèche, France
- Education: Beaux-Arts de Paris, 1953
- Awards: Aga Khan Award for Architecture National Order of Merit

André-Raymond-Marie Ravéreau (29 July 1919 – 12 October 2017) was a French architect, urban planner and architectural historian active in Algeria. Ravéreau was known for his study and reinterpretations of vernacular Algerian architecture, particularly in M'zab and Ghardaïa.

== Biography ==
Ravéreau was born André-Raymond-Marie Ravéreau on 29 July 1919 in Limoges, Haute-Vienne. Ravéreau'a initial architecture studies were interrupted by German occupation of France, and he was imprisoned in Nazi Germany for four years. Following the end of the war, Ravéreau resumed his studies at the Beaux-Arts de Paris under Auguste Perret. As a student Ravéreau travelled to M'zab and Ghardaïa. Graduating in 1953, the same year Ravéreau was sent by the Ministry for Europe and Foreign Affairs to Cephalonia to aid rebuilding efforts in the aftermath of the Ionian earthquake.

Ravéreau settled in M'zab in 1959. In 1965, Ravéreau was appointed the chief architect of historic monuments in Algeria. Ravéreau received the Aga Khan Award for Architecture for the 1978-1980 cycle for his 1976 design of the Mopti Medical Centre in Mopti, Mali.

== See also ==
- Hassan Fathy
