= 1995 Ghardaïa raid =

1995 terrorist attack in Algeria

Ghardaïa raid
- Part of Algerian Civil War
- Location: Ghardaïa, Algeria
- Date: 5 May 1995
- Target: Pipeline workers
- Deaths: 5 foreigners, 1 policeman
- Injuries: 4 policemen
- Perpetrator: Armed Islamic Group
- No. of participants: 20 militants

The Ghardaïa raid took place in a heavily guarded irrigation pipeline near the town of Ghardaïa on 5 May 1995 during the Algerian Civil War.

== Background ==
At dawn, roughly 20 Islamist militants attacked the foreign workers' barracks and escaped. Five foreign workers and an Algerian policeman were killed, and four additional officers were wounded.The victims were identified as two French citizens, one Canadian, one British and one Tunisian, working for Anabib Pipeline Interprise. No arrests were reported and no group initially claimed responsibility for the attack. The Islamic Salvation Front (FIS) blamed the Algerian government's secret services for the murders, however the Armed Islamic Group (GIA) claimed credit on 9 May. The GIA also threatened FIS officials in Algeria, Germany, the United States and France.
