= Chaamba =

Arab tribe in Algeria

Chaamba الشعانبة
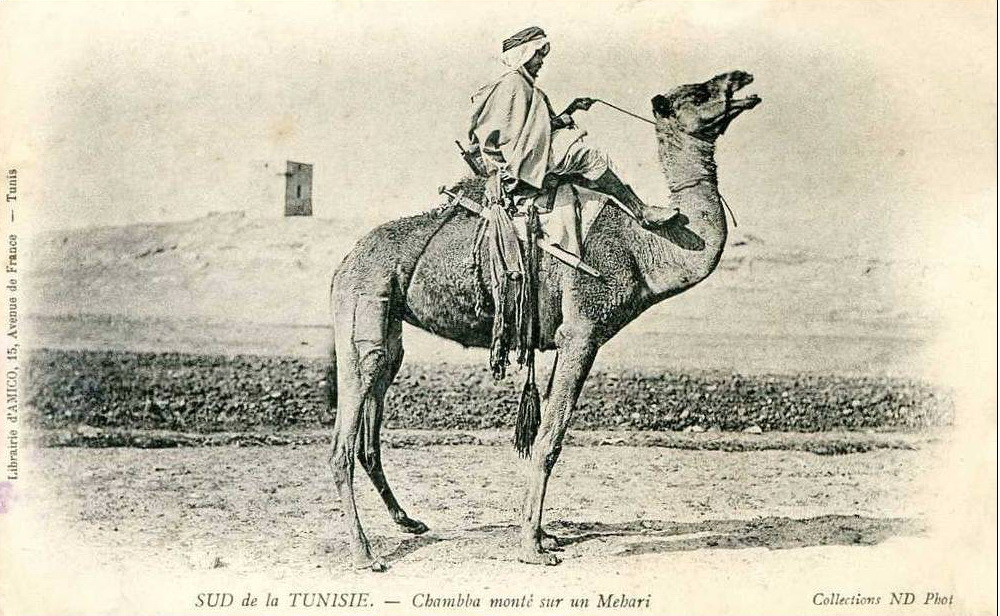
- Chaamba riding a camel in southern Tunisia
- Ethnicity: Arab
- Location: Algerian Desert
- Parent tribe: Banu Sulaym
- Language: Arabic
- Religion: Sunni Islam

The Chaamba (Arabic: الشعانبة, romanized: Sha‘āniba) are an Arab tribe in the northern Sahara of central Algeria. They are a large tribe of Bedouins and live in a large desert territory to the south of the Atlas Mountains, around Metlili, El Golea, Ouargla, El Oued, and the Great Western Erg, including Timimoun and Béni Abbès While traditionally they were nomads specialised in raising camels and caravan trade, most have settled in the oases over the past century. The date palm is the most important agricultural product for the Chaamba.

== Origin ==
The Chaamba are of Arab origin and are descended from Banu Sulaym who migrated from the Arabian Peninsula with Banu Hilal. They speak an Arabic dialect classified as Hilalian.

Locations in Algeria

== History ==
In 1937, it was estimated that 80 percent of all shops in the southwestern Sahara in Algeria were owned by the Chaamba and in 1961 they had a population of 20,000 people. In 1984, clashes broke out between the Maliki Sunni Chaamba and Ibadi Mozabites. In 2008, there were several clashes between Chaamba and Mozabite youths in the oasis of Berriane, following a miscarriage caused by a firework. Clashes broke out again in July 2015 between the Chaamba and Mozabites in the Mzab valley which left at least 22 dead and hundreds injured.
