= Daïa =

11th Century Berber Saint

Daïa (fl. 11th century) is a Berber saint. She is venerated by the Mozabites of the M'zab region (in present-day Algeria). She is reputed to have lived in a cave (ghār) near Wadi Mzab in the M'zab valley. Kharijite Muslims later flocked to the valley and built the town of Ghardaïa to escape persecution from the Fatimids in the north.
