= Sebseb =

Sebseb سبسب
- Commune and town
- Location of Sebseb commune within Ghardaïa Province

- Location of Sebseb within Algeria
- Coordinates: 32°09′30″N 3°36′30″E
- Country: Algeria
- Province: Ghardaïa
- District: Métlili

Government
  - PMA Seats: 7

Area
  - Total: 5,640 km^{2} (2,180 sq mi)

Population (2008)
  - Total: 2,437
  - Density: 0.432/km^{2} (1.12/sq mi)
- Time zone: UTC+01 (CET)
- Postal code: 47230
- ONS code: 4709

Sebseb is a town and commune in Métlili District, Ghardaïa Province, Algeria. According to the 2008 census it has a population of 2,437, up from 2,428 in 1998, with an annual growth rate of 0.0%, the lowest in the province. Its postal code is 47230 and its municipal code is 4709.

== Climate ==
Sebseb has a hot desert climate (Köppen climate classification BWh), with very hot summers and mild winters, and very little precipitation throughout the year.

Climate data for Sebseb
Month	Jan	Feb	Mar	Apr	May	Jun	Jul	Aug	Sep	Oct	Nov	Dec	Year
Mean daily maximum °C (°F)	16.5 (61.7)	19.2 (66.6)	22.8 (73.0)	28.3 (82.9)	33.2 (91.8)	38.7 (101.7)	42.7 (108.9)	41.8 (107.2)	35.6 (96.1)	28.3 (82.9)	21.1 (70.0)	17.0 (62.6)	28.8 (83.8)
Daily mean °C (°F)	10.2 (50.4)	12.5 (54.5)	15.8 (60.4)	20.4 (68.7)	25.2 (77.4)	30.5 (86.9)	33.9 (93.0)	33.3 (91.9)	28.4 (83.1)	21.5 (70.7)	14.9 (58.8)	10.8 (51.4)	21.5 (70.6)
Mean daily minimum °C (°F)	4.0 (39.2)	5.9 (42.6)	8.9 (48.0)	12.6 (54.7)	17.3 (63.1)	22.4 (72.3)	25.2 (77.4)	24.8 (76.6)	21.3 (70.3)	14.7 (58.5)	8.7 (47.7)	4.7 (40.5)	14.2 (57.6)
Average precipitation mm (inches)	7 (0.3)	4 (0.2)	9 (0.4)	5 (0.2)	3 (0.1)	2 (0.1)	1 (0.0)	1 (0.0)	4 (0.2)	5 (0.2)	7 (0.3)	6 (0.2)	54 (2.2)
Source: climate-data.org

== Transportation ==
A local road connects Sebseb to Route N1 (the Trans-Sahara Highway) to the southeast and to the N107 just west of Metlili to the north.

== Education ==
5.9% of the population has a tertiary education, and another 20.2% has completed secondary education. The overall literacy rate is 76.2%, and is 82.1% among males and 70.0% among females.

== Localities ==
The commune of Sebseb is composed of one locality:

- Seb Seb et ses environs
