= Bérianne District =

Bérianne District دائرة بريان
- District
- Map of Algeria highlighting Ghardaïa Province

- Map of Ghardaïa Province highlighting Bérianne District
- Coordinates: 32°50′N 3°46′E
- Country: Algeria
- Province: Ghardaïa
- District seat: Bérianne
- Time zone: UTC+1 (CET)

Bérianne is a district in Ghardaïa Province, Algeria. It was named after its capital, Bérianne.

== Municipalities ==
The district is coextensive with its only municipality:

- Bérianne, a town of 30,200 people which saw ethnic unrest in May 2008.
