= El Atteuf =

El Atteuf العطف
- Commune and town
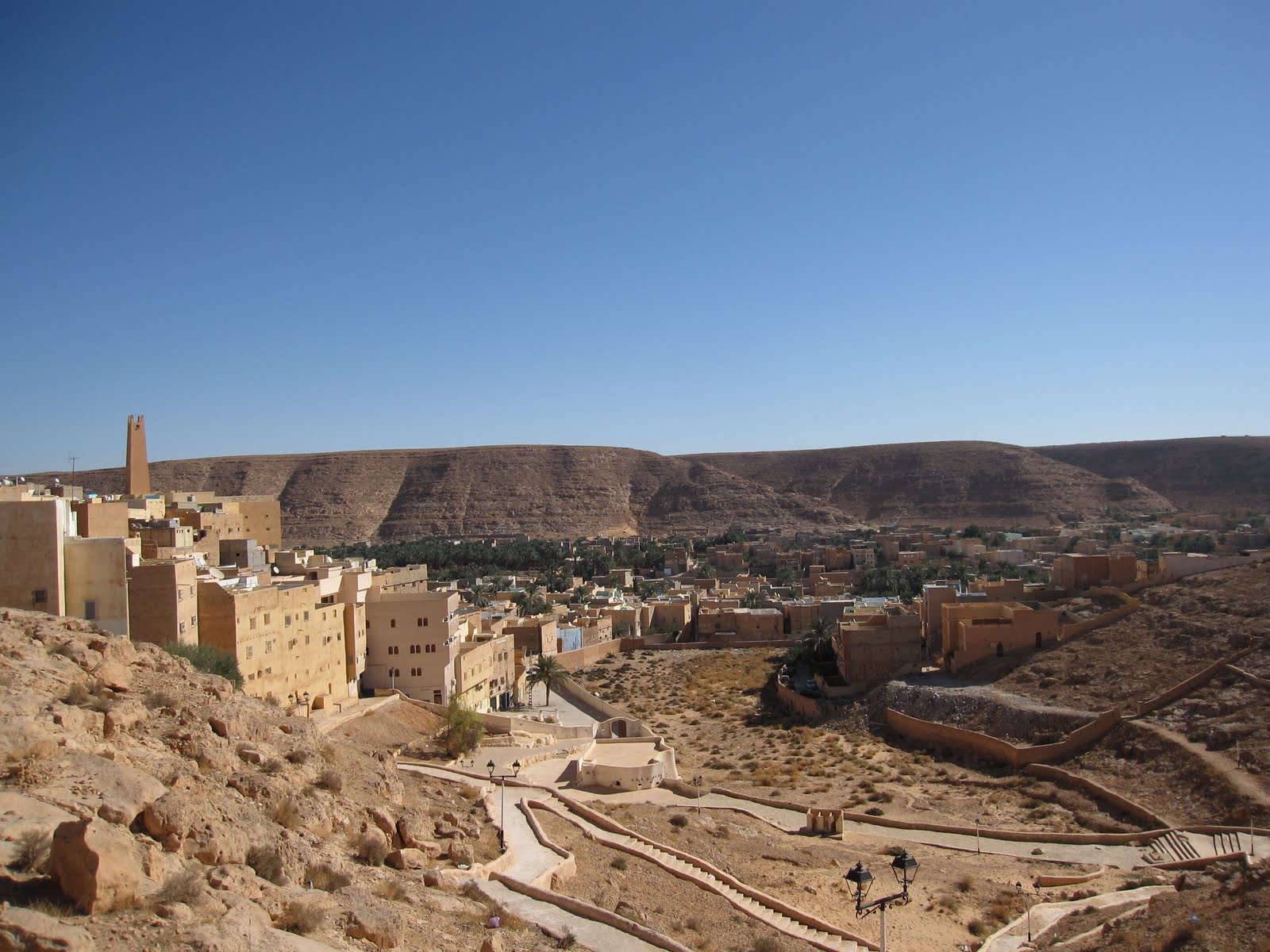

- Location of El Atteuf commune within Ghardaïa Province

- Location of El Atteuf within Algeria
- Coordinates: 32°28′39″N 3°44′52″E
- Country: Algeria
- Province: Ghardaïa Province
- Elevation: 458 m (1,503 ft)

Population (2008)
  - Total: 14,752
- Time zone: UTC+1 (CET)

El Atteuf (Arabic: العطف) is a town and commune in Ghardaïa Province, Algeria. According to the 2008 census it has a population of 14,752, up from 12,713 in 1998, and an annual population growth rate of 1.5%. It is located in the M'zab valley about 6 kilometres (3.7 mi) east of Ghardaïa, the provincial capital.

== Geography ==
El Atteuf lies on the banks of the Wadi Mzab, an intermittent river in the M'zab valley, downstream of Ghardaïa. The area has been listed as a UNESCO World Heritage Site. El Atteuf is the oldest town in the area.

== Education ==
7.0% of the population has a tertiary education (the equal second highest in the province after Metlili), and another 16.6% has competed secondary education. The overall literacy rate is 89.4% (the highest in the province), and is 95.3% among males (equal highest in the province) and 83.2% among females (highest in the province).

== Localities ==
The commune of El Atteuf is composed of four localities:

- Vieux Ksar El Atteuf
- Rezzag
- El Argoub
- Assedjlaf et la Palmeraie
