= Métlili District =

District of Algeria

Métlili District دائرة متليلي
- District
- Map of Ghardaïa Province highlighting Métlili District
- Coordinates: 32°16′22″N 3°37′39″E
- Country: Algeria
- Province: Ghardaïa
- District seat: Métlili

Area
  - Total: 12,940 km^{2} (5,000 sq mi)

Population (2005)
  - Total: 43,486
  - Density: 3.361/km^{2} (8.704/sq mi)
- Time zone: UTC+01 (CET)
- Municipalities: 2

Métlili is a district in Ghardaïa Province, Algeria. It was named after its capital, Métlili.

== Municipalities ==
The district is further divided into 2 municipalities:

- Métlili
- Sebseb
