= Bounoura =

Bounoura بونورة
- Commune and town
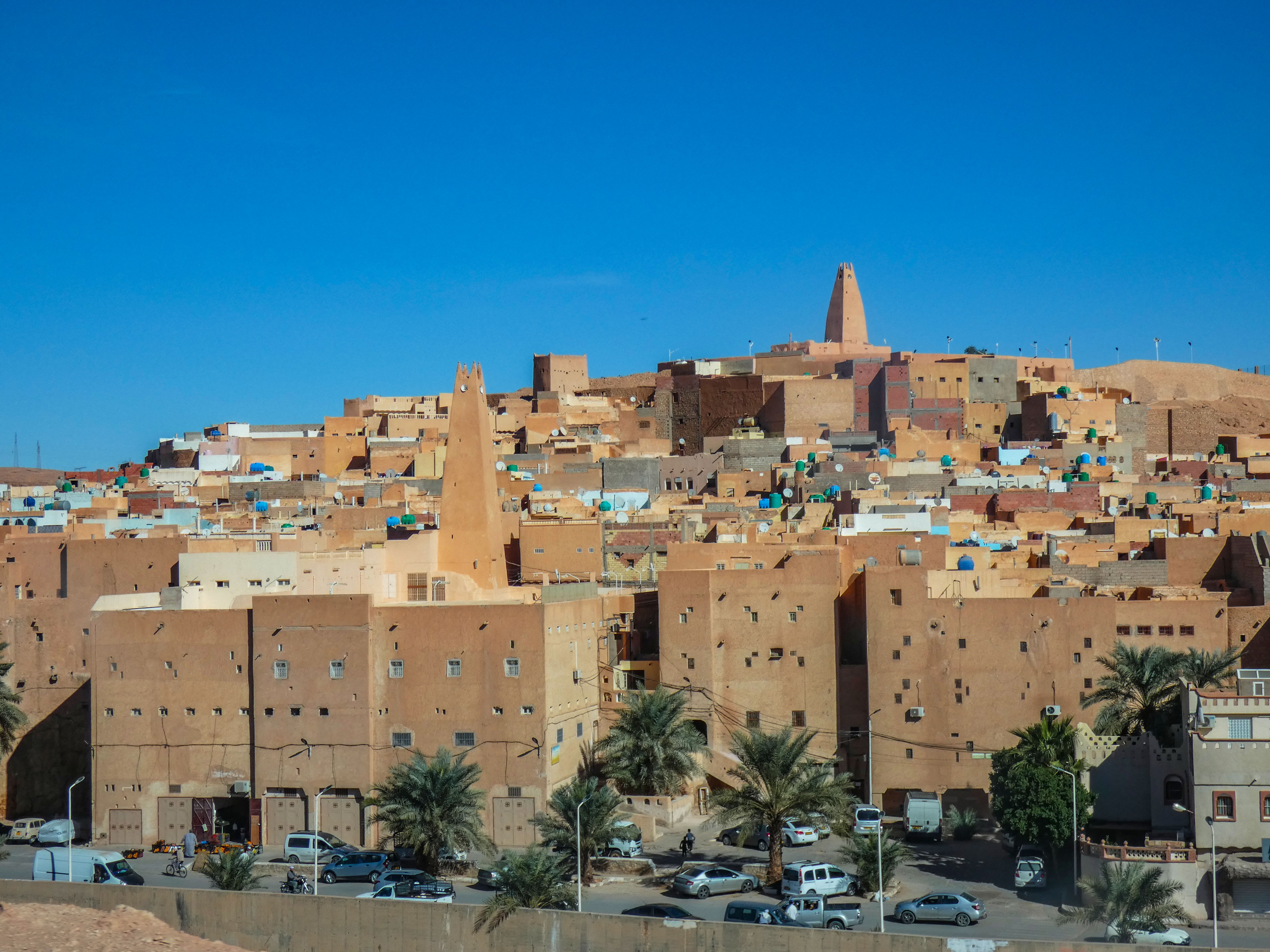
- Bounoura ksar.

- Location of Bounoura commune within Ghardaïa Province

- Location of Bounoura within Algeria
- Coordinates: 32°28′57″N 3°42′13″E
- Country: Algeria
- Province: Ghardaïa Province
- District: Bounoura District
- Elevation: 493 m (1,617 ft)

Population (2008)
  - Total: 35,405
- Time zone: UTC+1 (CET)

Bounoura (Arabic: بونورة, Berber: ⴰⵜ ⴱⵓⵏⵓⵔ, At-Bounour, البونور) is a town and commune in Ghardaïa Province, Algeria. According to the 2008 census it has a population of 35,405, up from 27,775 in 1998, with an annual growth rate of 2.5%. It is effectively a suburb of the provincial capital Ghardaïa.

Bounoura is also the name of one of the ksars of the pentapolis of the M'zab valley, constituting the commune of Bounoura.

== Geography ==
Bounoura lies on the banks of the Wadi Mzab, an intermittent river in the M'zab valley, just downstream upstream of Ghardaïa. The area has been listed as a UNESCO World Heritage Site.

== Transportation ==
Bounoura is located on the N1 highway, part of the Trans-Sahara Highway, which leads north to Laghouat and south to El Goléa, In Salah and Tamanrasset.

== Education ==
7.0% of the population has a tertiary education, and another 16.0% has completed secondary education. The overall literacy rate is 86.3%, and is 95.3% among males (joint highest in the province) and 77.2% among females.

== Localities ==
In 1984, the commune of Bounoura is composed of five localities, including Beni Isguen ksar. From the 1990s, new localities emerged to respond to the housing crisis. This is particularly the case of Tafilelt, Tinemmirine, Tawenza and Tinaâm attached to Bounoura, which were built according to the principles of ksourian architecture, and adapted to the proximity of the desert.

- Bounoura historic ksar
- Beni Izguen from the new highschool and new C.E.M.
- Sidi Abbaz neighbourhood
- Bounoura palm grove
- Beni Isguen historic ksar
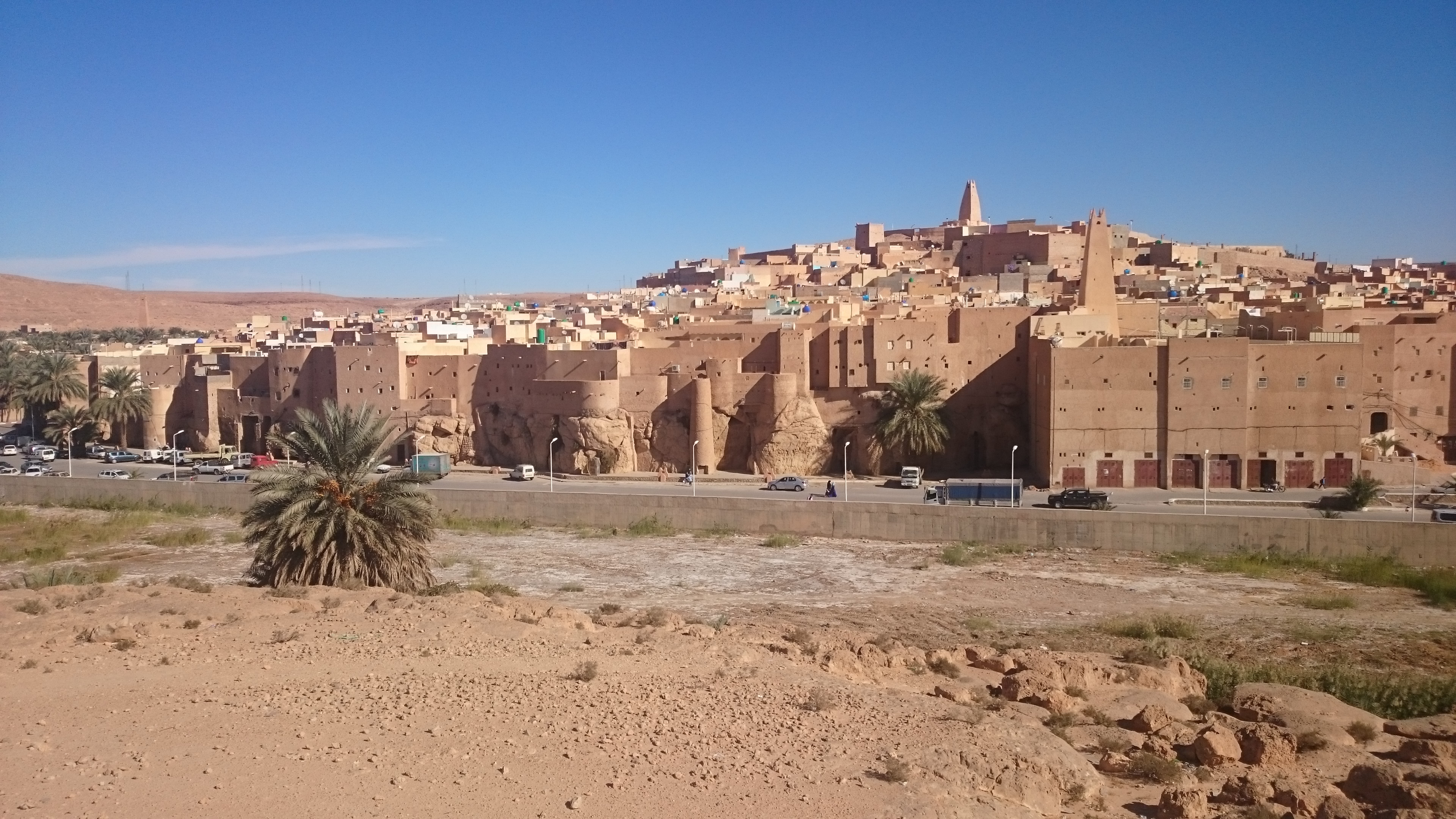
Bounoura ksar.

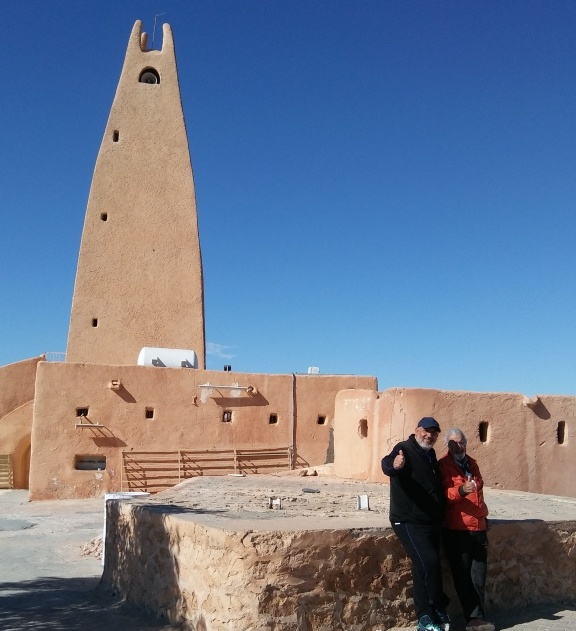
Great mosque of Bounoura.

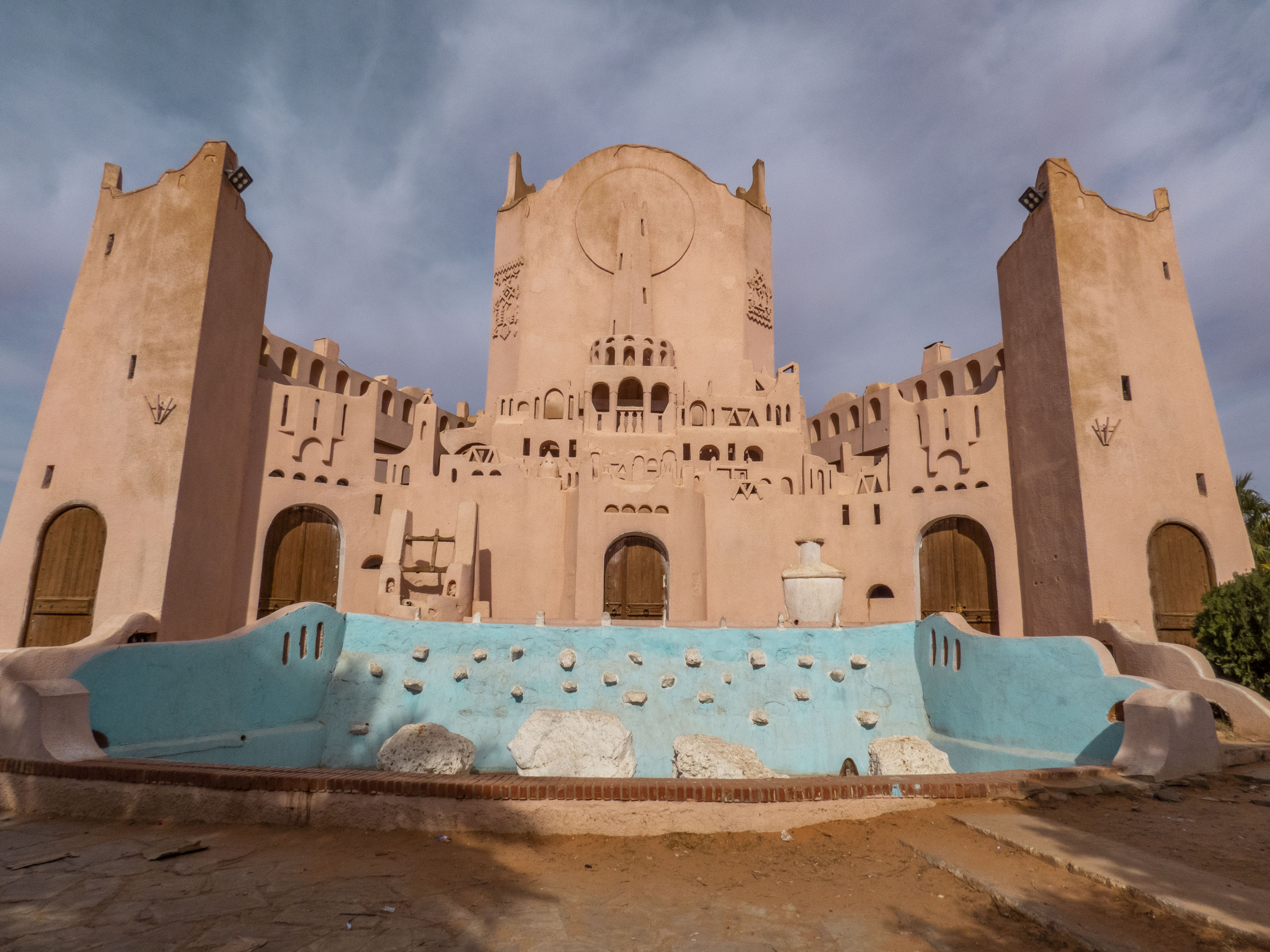
Bounoura roundabout, monument for Moufdi Zakaria.

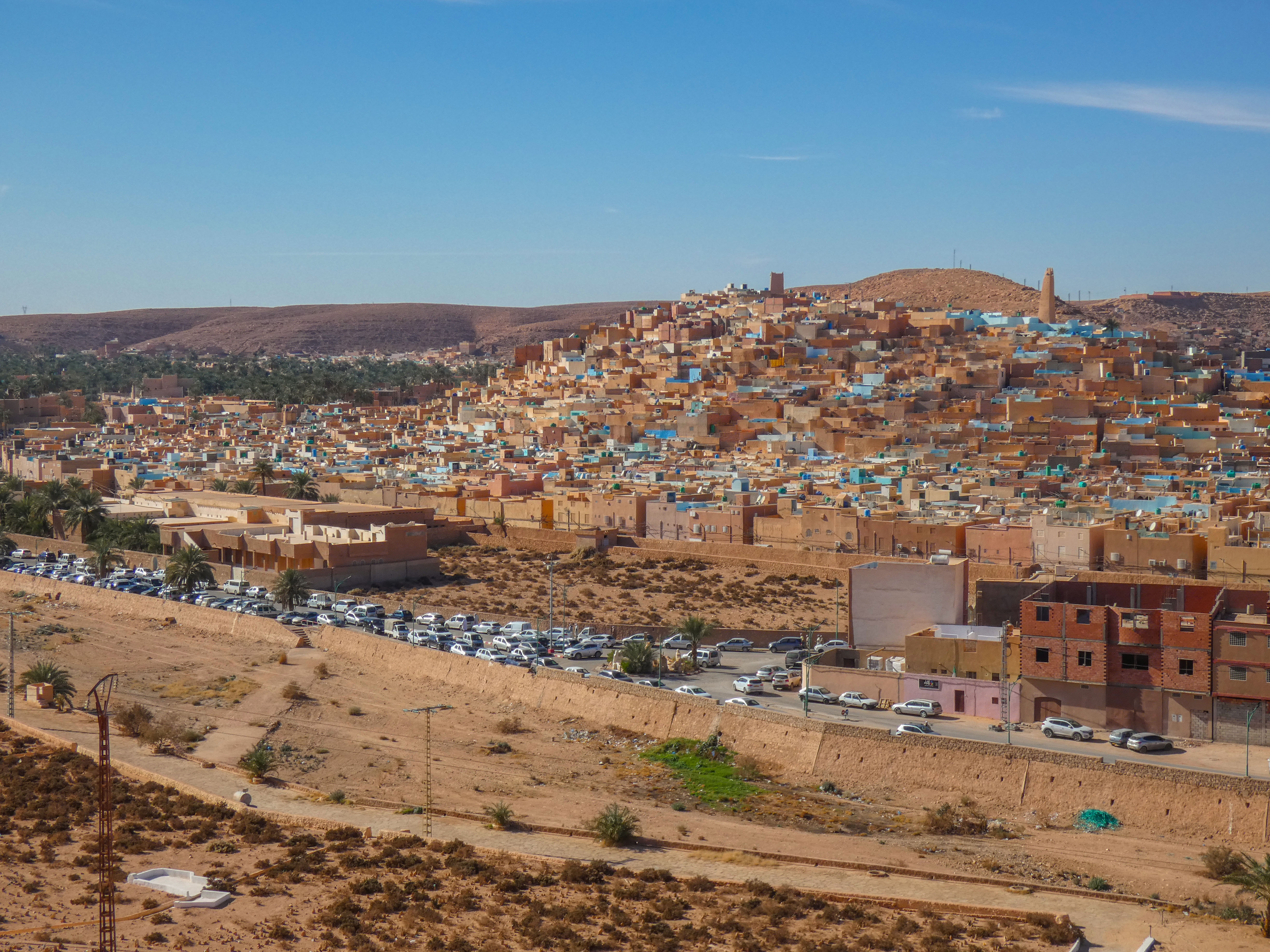
Beni Isguen ksar.

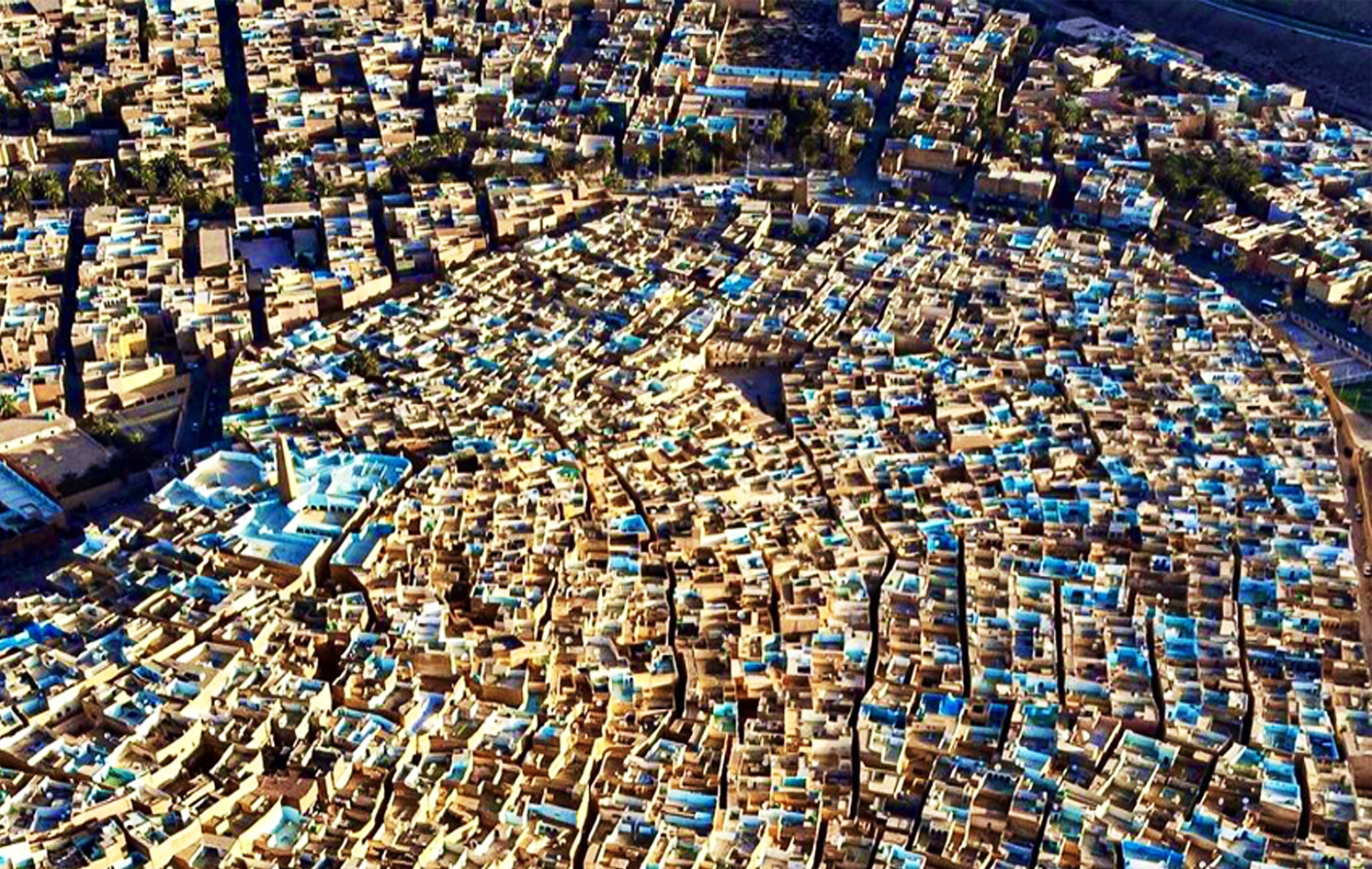
Beni Isguen ksar from the sky.

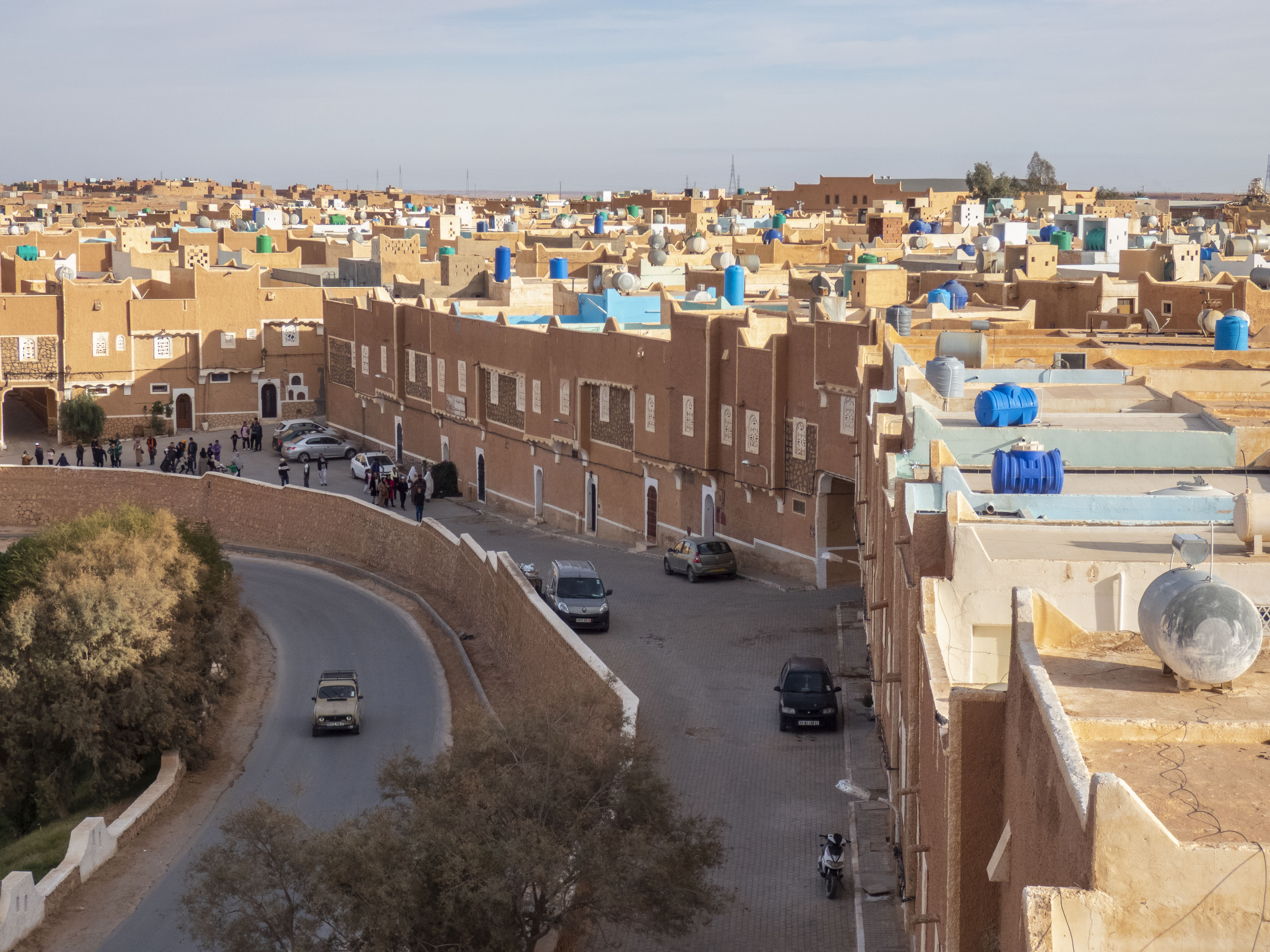
View of the new town Tafilelt.

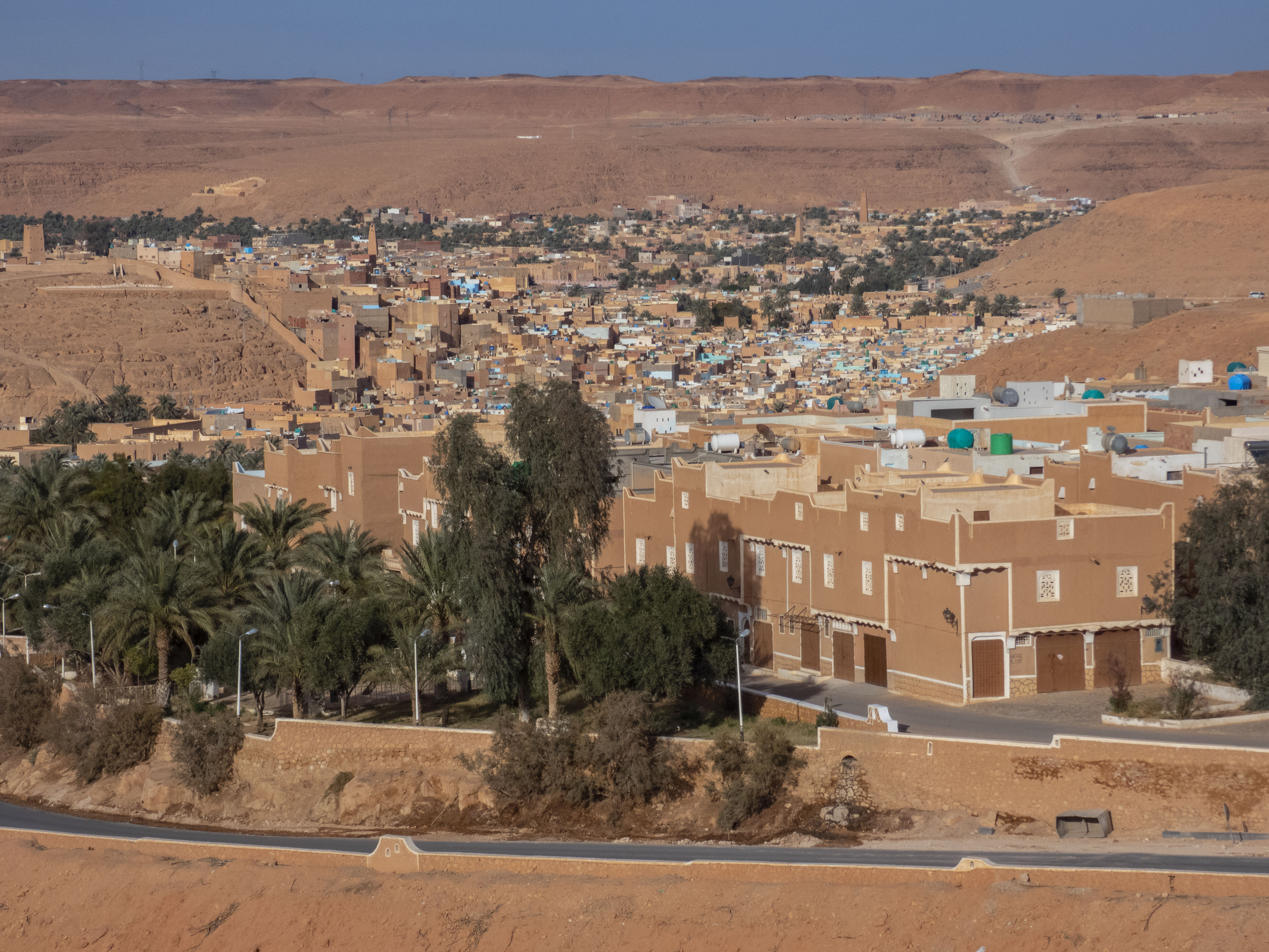
View of the new town of Tinemmirine, from the new town of Tafilelt.

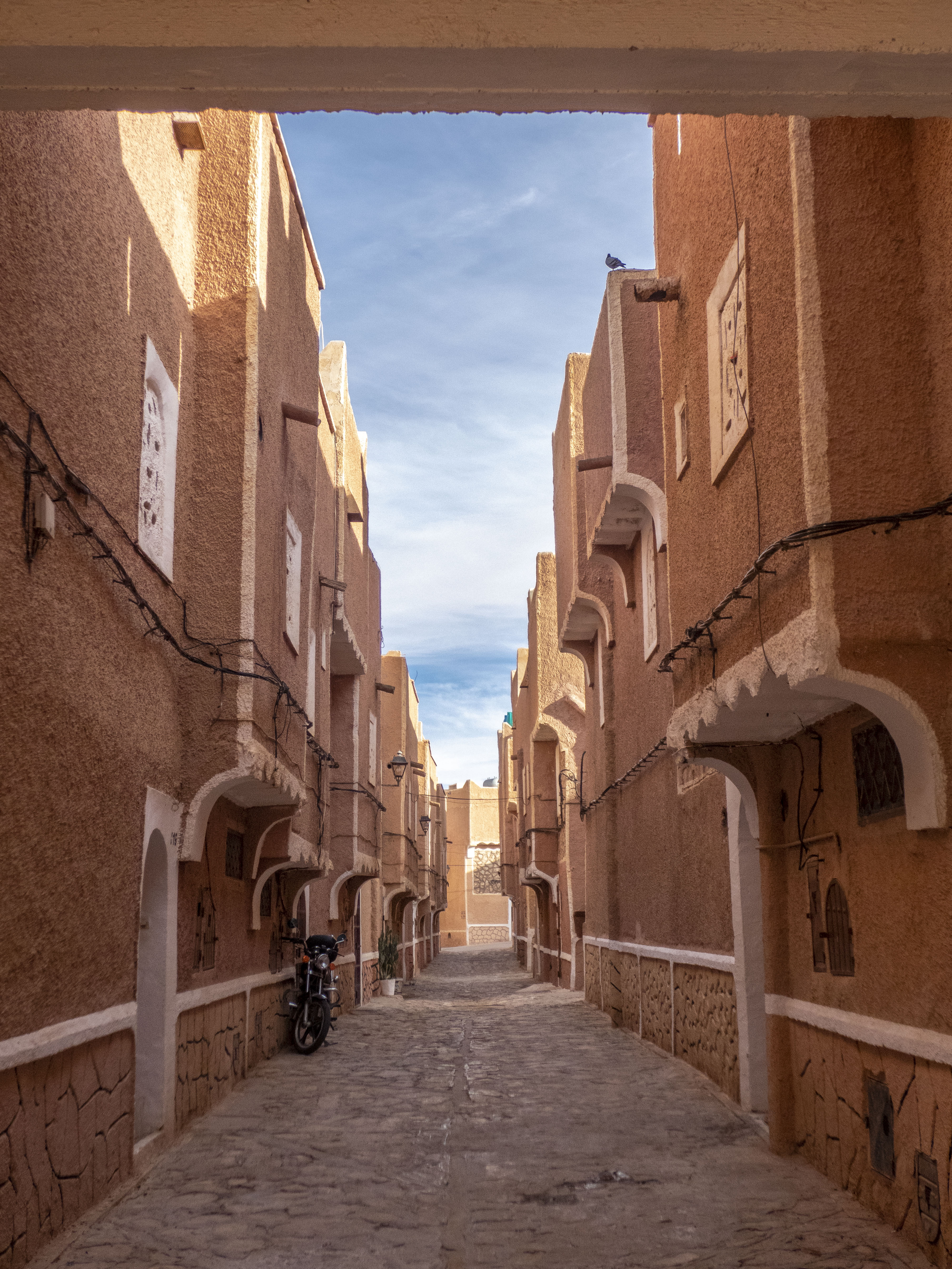
Tafilelt street.

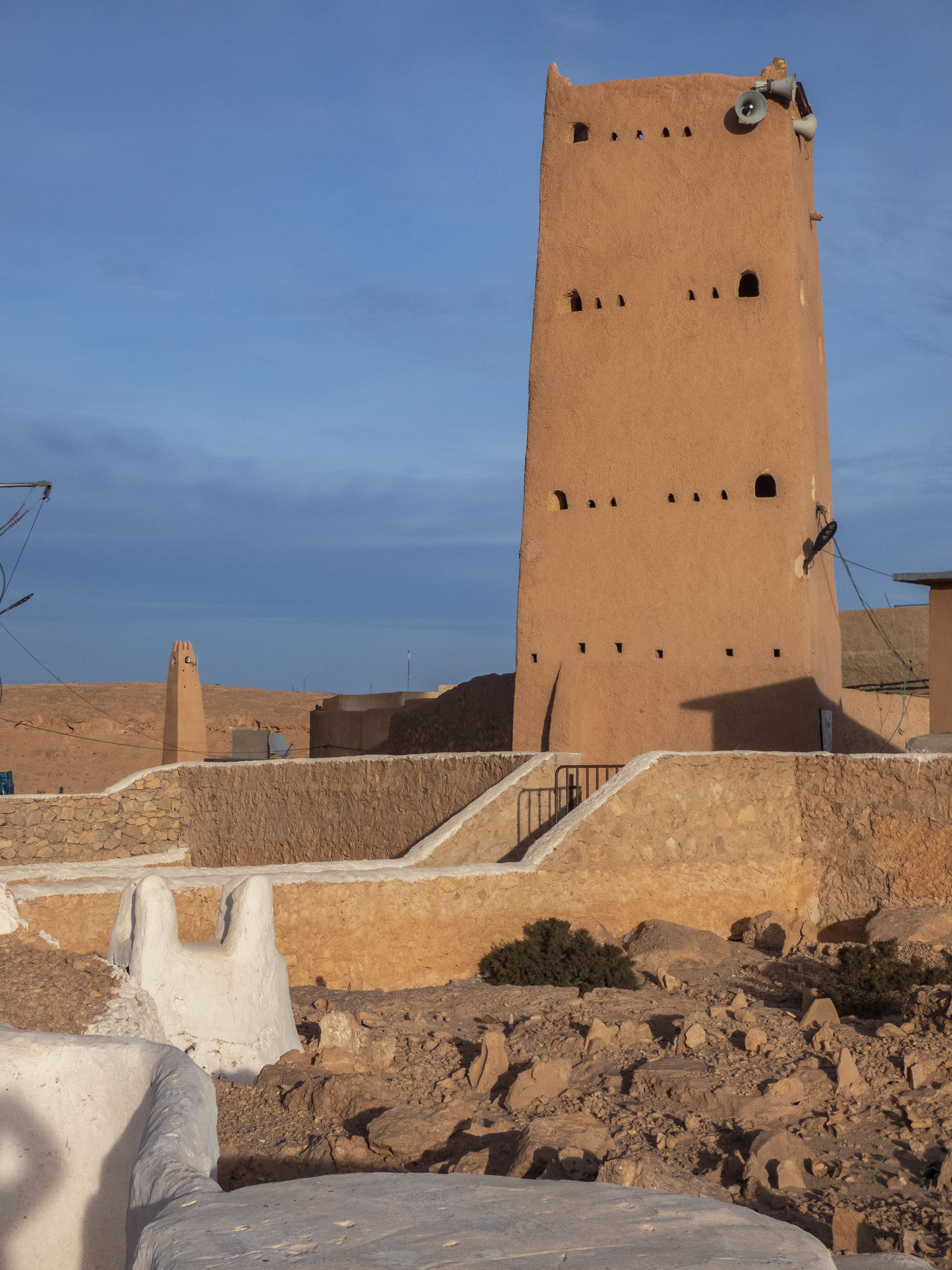
Boulila tower, mosque and 4-fingered iduden, Beni Isguen ksar.

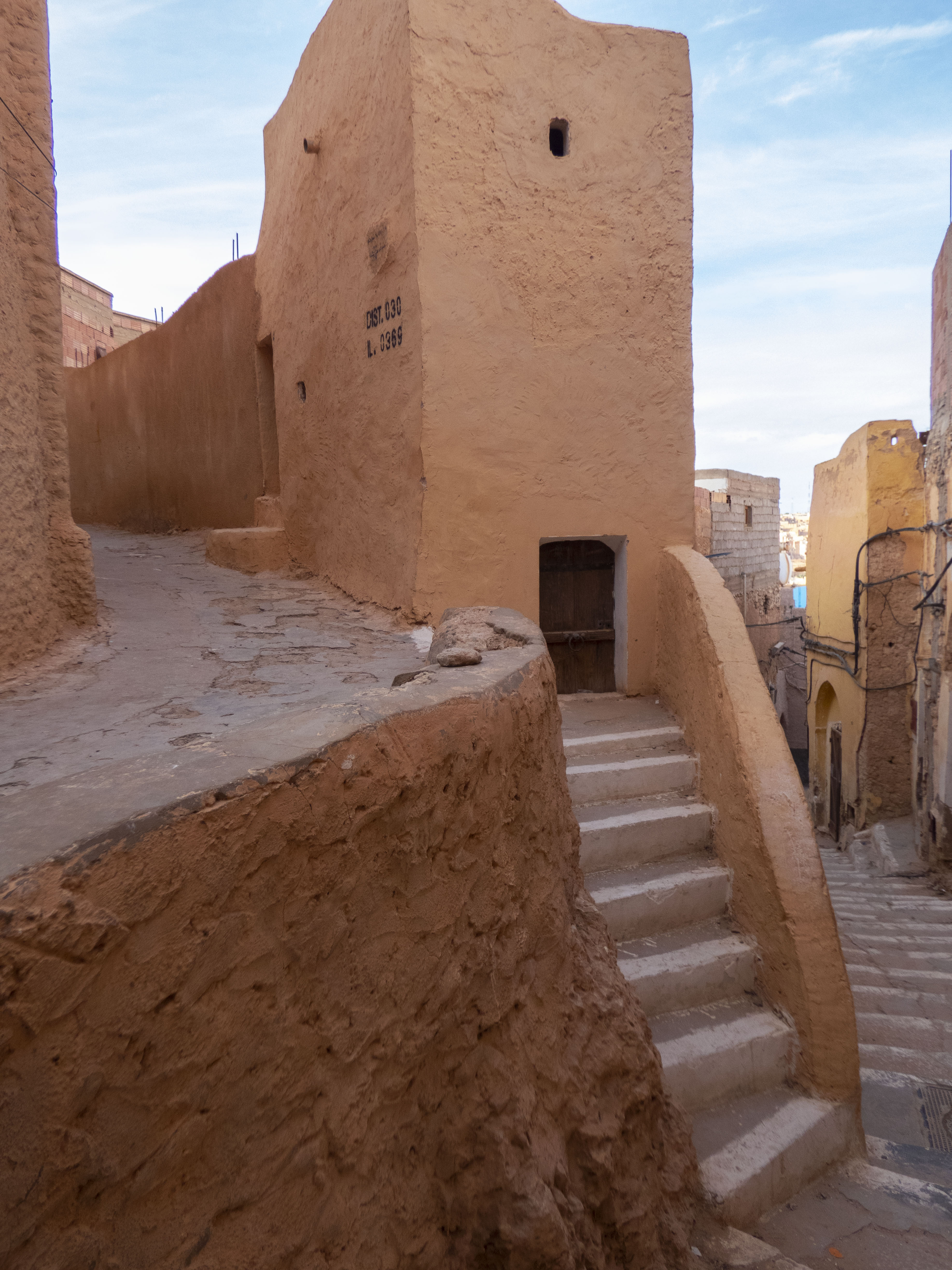
Beni Isguen ksar street.

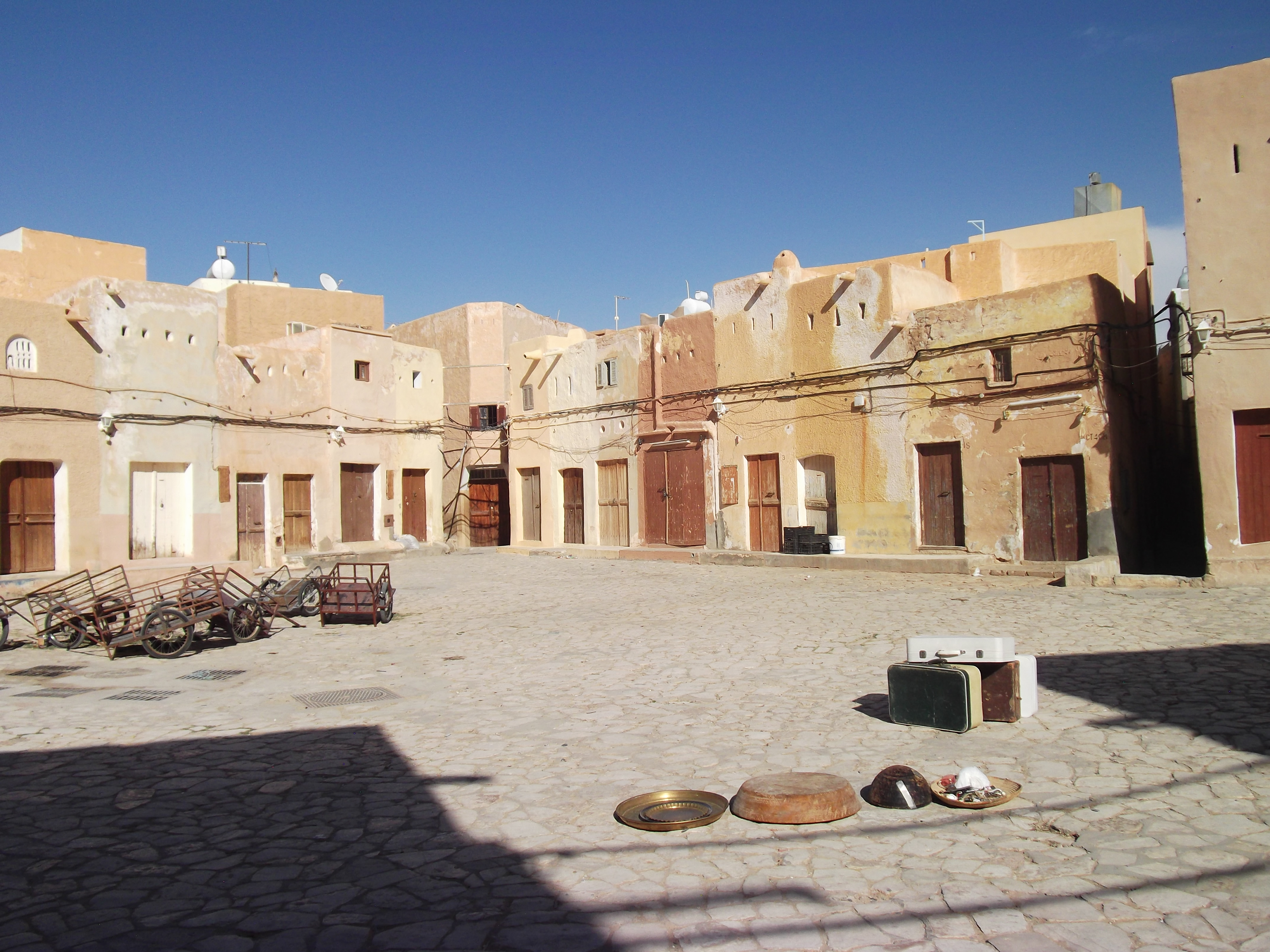
Market place, Beni Isguen ksar.
