= Berriane =

Berriane بريان
- Commune and town
- Location of Berriane commune within Ghardaïa Province

- Location of Berriane within Algeria
- Coordinates: 32°50′N 3°46′E
- Country: Algeria
- Province: Ghardaïa Province
- District: Bérianne District (coextensive)

Area
  - Total: 2.25 km^{2} (0.87 sq mi)
- Elevation: 539 m (1,768 ft)

Population (2008)
  - Total: 30,200
- Time zone: UTC+1 (CET)

Berriane (from Tamazight: Bergan) (Arabic: بريان) is a medium-sized town and commune in the south of Algeria, coextensive with Bérianne District, in Ghardaïa Province, Algeria. It is located in the north of the Sahara desert, in the extreme North of the wilaya of Ghardaïa, 554 kilometres (344 mi) south of Algiers and 43 kilometres (27 mi) north of Ghardaïa City. As of the 2008 census it has a population of 30,200, up from 24,802 in 1998, with an annual growth rate of 2.0%. It occupies an area of 2.250 km^{2}.

== History ==
Archaeological, prehistoric and historical testimonies indicate that the area of Berriane was inhabited since at least the Neolithic era. The population of Berriane are principally of Zenata Mozabite origin.

The town of Berriane forms an integral part of the history of the area of M'zab. It is chronologically the youngest of all the cities of the M'zab region.

=== Recent events ===
Although an ancient Berber town, with a majority Zenata Ibadi population, in recent years many Chaambi (Bedouin) Arabs have settled there. In March 2008 and February 2009 it was the scene of heavy riots between Berbers and Arabs, in which at least 4 native Berbers were killed.

== Geography ==
In addition to its regional importance from the demographic, economic and cultural point of view, the commune of Berriane occupies a strategic position, connecting the cities of the South to those of the North.

Its green palm grove forms a beautiful oasis which offers to its urban environment a more pleasant microclimate in an area characterized by an arid climate.

== Climate ==
Berriane has a hot desert climate (Köppen climate classification BWh), with very hot summers and mild winters, and very little precipitation throughout the year.

Climate data for Berriane
Month	Jan	Feb	Mar	Apr	May	Jun	Jul	Aug	Sep	Oct	Nov	Dec	Year
Mean daily maximum °C (°F)	15.5 (59.9)	18.2 (64.8)	21.4 (70.5)	26.9 (80.4)	31.6 (88.9)	37 (99)	41.6 (106.9)	40.3 (104.5)	33.9 (93.0)	26.5 (79.7)	20 (68)	16.1 (61.0)	27.4 (81.4)
Daily mean °C (°F)	9.6 (49.3)	11.7 (53.1)	14.6 (58.3)	19.2 (66.6)	23.6 (74.5)	28.8 (83.8)	32.8 (91.0)	31.8 (89.2)	26.9 (80.4)	19.9 (67.8)	13.9 (57.0)	10.2 (50.4)	20.3 (68.4)
Mean daily minimum °C (°F)	3.7 (38.7)	5.2 (41.4)	7.9 (46.2)	11.5 (52.7)	15.7 (60.3)	20.7 (69.3)	24.0 (75.2)	23.3 (73.9)	19.9 (67.8)	13.4 (56.1)	7.8 (46.0)	4.3 (39.7)	13.1 (55.6)
Average precipitation mm (inches)	8 (0.3)	6 (0.2)	11 (0.4)	8 (0.3)	6 (0.2)	4 (0.2)	1 (0.0)	6 (0.2)	8 (0.3)	9 (0.4)	9 (0.4)	8 (0.3)	84 (3.2)
Source: climate-data.org

== Transportation ==
Berriane is crossed by the National Road 01, one of the country's important communication lines, and part of the Trans-Sahara Highway. The road leads north to Laghouat and Djelfa, and south to Ghardaïa, In Salah and Tamanrasset.

== Culture ==
Berriane is known for its pretty handicraft carpets and its artisanal products manufactured by highly qualified creators. It is also known for its folklore, culture heritage, ancestral culinary art and architecture.

== Economy ==
In addition to its agricultural economy centered around date palms, Berriane is also an attractive city for tourists, featuring engravings and rock frescos dating from prehistory, inscriptions in the Tamazight alphabet called Tifinagh, and historic buildings and architecture similar to other cities of the internationally famous M'Zab. The M'Zab region has classified by UNESCO as a world cultural heritage on its World Heritage List.

== Education ==
6.3% of the population has a tertiary education, and another 15.3% has completed secondary education. The overall literacy rate is 88.3% (the second highest in the province), and is 93.3% among males and 83.2% among females (also the second highest in the province).

== Localities ==
The commune of Berriane is composed of two localities:

- Vieux Ksar de Berriane
- Quartiers périphériques et Palmeraie
