= Moufdi Zakaria =

Algerian poet

- مفدي زكرياء
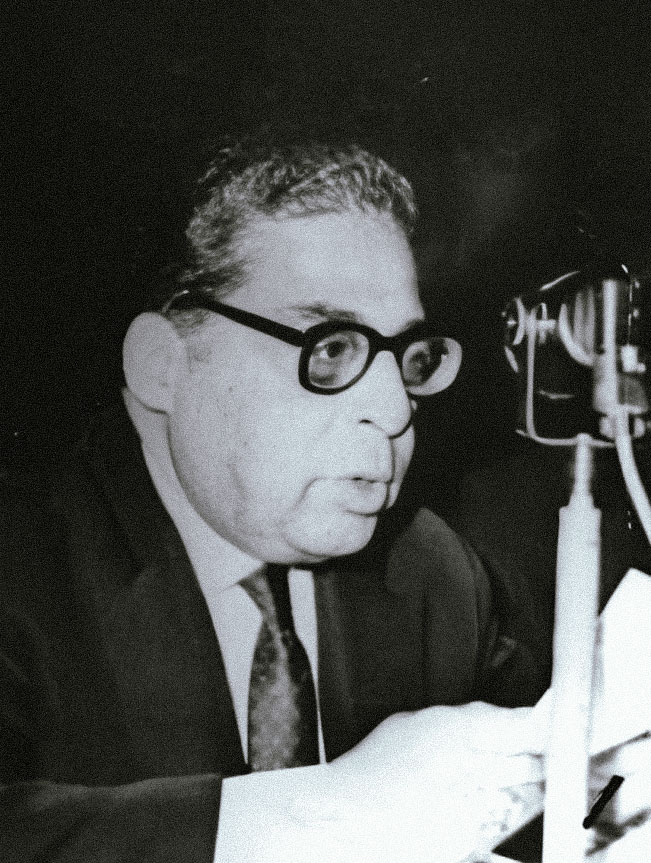
- Born: Cheikh Zakaria Ben Slimane Ben Yahia Ben Cheikh Slimane Ben Hadj Aïssa; 12 June 1908; Beni Isguen, Ghardaïa, French Algeria
- Died: 17 August 1977 (aged 69); Tunis, Tunisia
- Occupations: Poet, writer
- Known for: Author of the lyrics of the Algerian national anthem Poet of the Algerian Revolution

Cheikh Zakaria Ben Slimane Ben Yahia Ben Cheikh Slimane Ben Hadj Aïssa (12 June 1908 – 17 August 1977), commonly known as Moufdi Zakaria and also referred to by some sources as Zekri Cheikh, was an Algerian activist, nationalist, poet and writer. He wrote the lyrics of Kassaman, the national anthem of Algeria, purportedly with his own blood while imprisoned by the French in 1955.

== Biography ==
Zakaria was born on 12 June 1908. Of Mozabite origin, he spent the early years of his life in the M'zab region of Algeria. The name Moufdi was given to him by a school friend.

He became associated with Algerian nationalism and served time in prison for his beliefs from 1937 to 1938. In 1955, he was imprisoned again in Serkadji prison by the French for his political views. There, he wrote a poem called Kassaman or The Pledge. It was said that he wrote the poem on the walls of his cell using his own blood because he had neither pencils nor paper to write in the prison. The poem was later set to music by Mohamed Triki in 1956 and then by Mohamed Fawzi. The final song was heard in 1957. This poem became the Algerian national anthem shortly after 5 July 1962 when independence was achieved.

Zakaria died in 1977 in Tunisia, but his body was buried in Algeria.

== Poetry ==
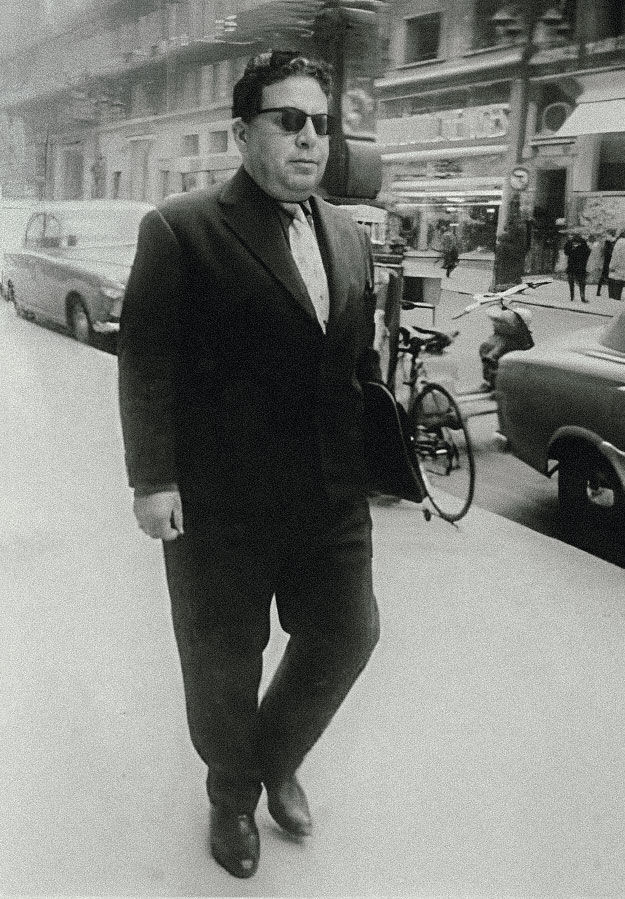
Moufdi Zakaria

His university education was in Tunis, Tunisia where he met a number of poets. His first poetry was published in a Tunisian newspaper in 1925.

Moufdi Zakaria uses implied texts in his poems through which readers can get different reflections from his poems. Quran is one of the implied texts in his works, and it is strongly present in his works.

His poetry was believed to be largely influenced by the work of Egyptian poet Ahmed Shawqi.

== Legacy ==
Noumérat – Moufdi Zakaria Airport in Ghardaïa is named in his honour. His name was also given to a cultural centre built in 1984.

=== Portrayals in film ===
A film was made on him in 2012 by Saïd Oulmi, titled "Moufdi Zakaria, Poet of the Revolution".
