= Ghardaïa =

Ghardaïa غرداية
- City
- City of Ghardaïa
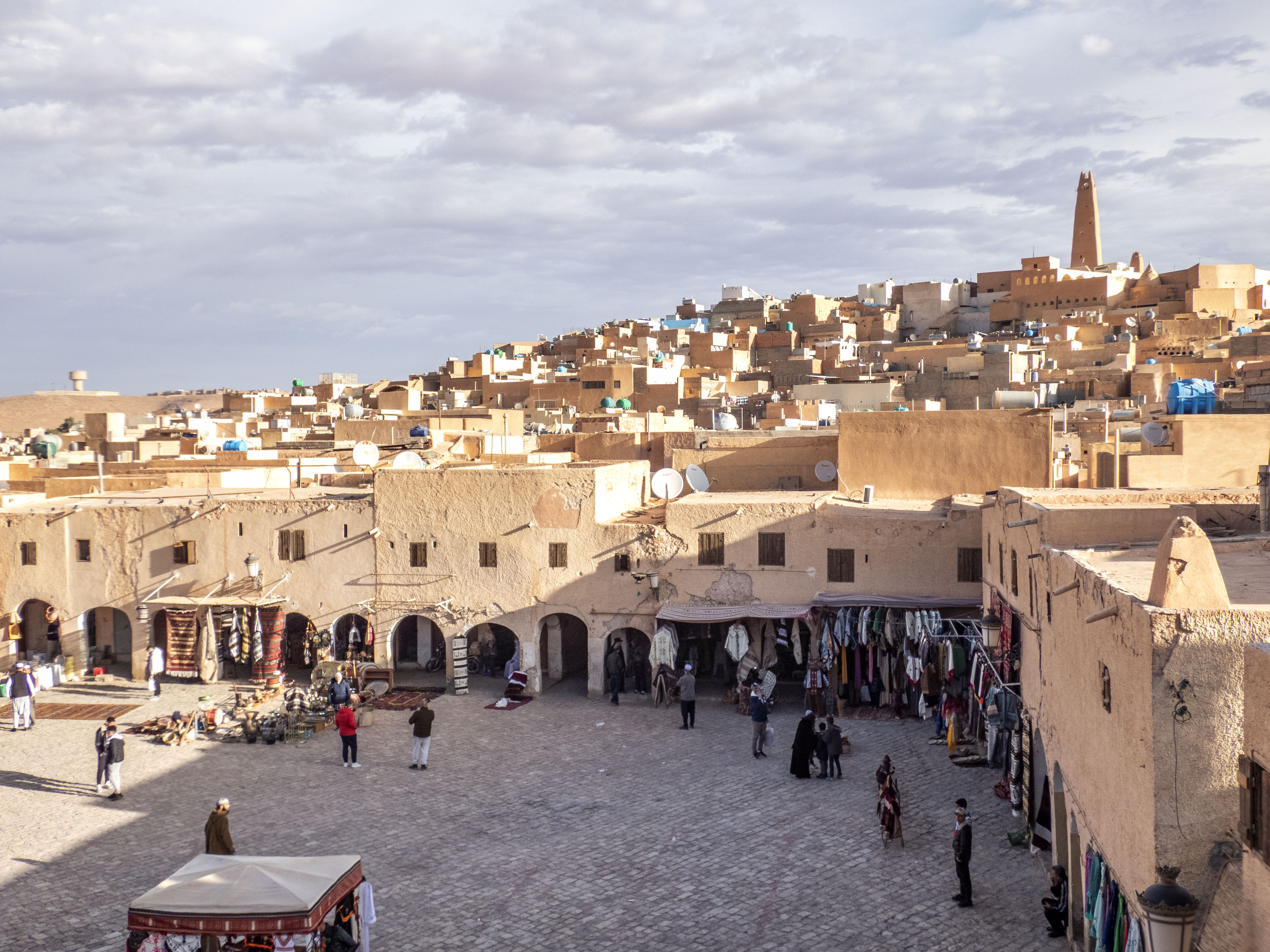

- Location of the city of Ghardaïa within Ghardaïa Province

- Location of Ghardaïa within Algeria
- Coordinates: 32°29′N 3°40′E
- Country: Algeria
- Province: Ghardaïa Province (seat)
- District: Ghardaïa District (coextensive)
- Founded: 1048

Government
  - PMA Seats: 15

Area
  - Total: 590 km^{2} (230 sq mi)
- Elevation: 572 m (1,877 ft)

Population (2008)
  - Total: 142,913
  - Density: 240/km^{2} (630/sq mi)
- Time zone: UTC+1 (CET)
- Postal code: 47000
- ONS code: 4701

UNESCO World Heritage Site
- Part of: M'Zab Valley
- Criteria: Cultural: (ii)(iii)(v)
- Reference: 188
- Inscription: 1982 (6th Session)

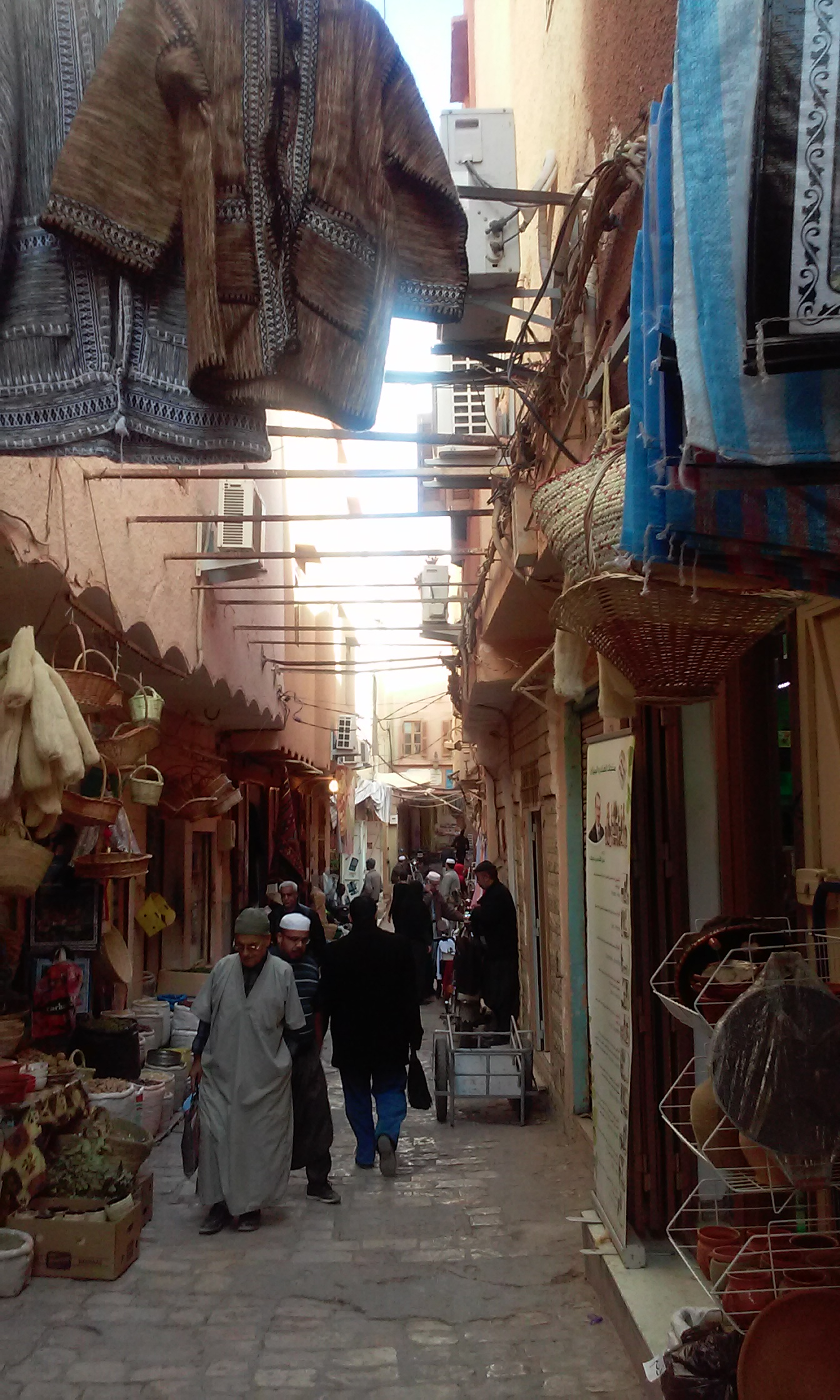
The Old Souk

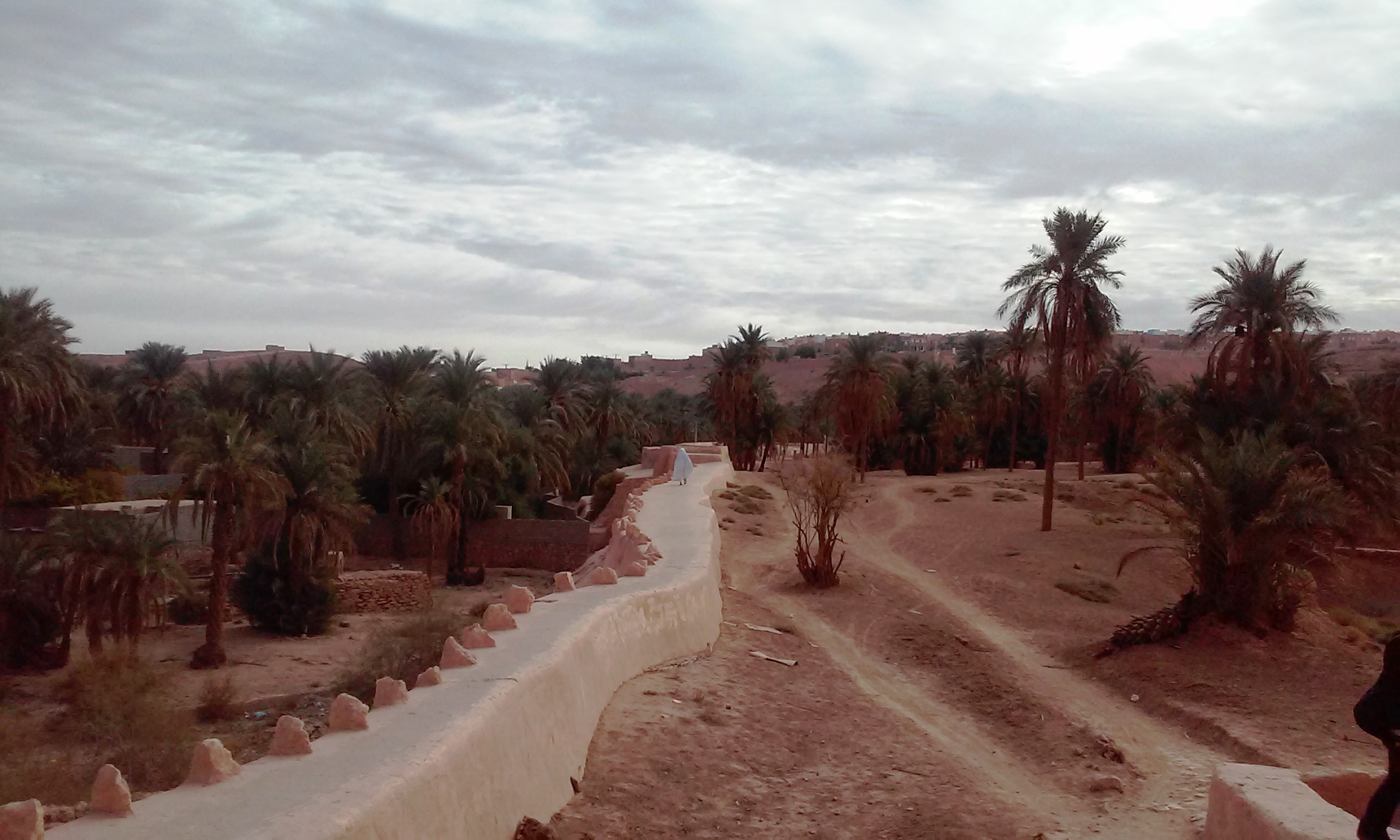
Metissa Dam Wadi Mzab

Ghardaïa (Arabic: غرداية, Tumzabt: Taɣerdayt) is the capital city of Ghardaïa Province, Algeria. The commune of Ghardaïa has a population of 93,423 according to the 2008 census, up from 87,599 in 1998, with an annual growth rate of 0.7%., up to 477953 in 2019 with an annual growth rate of 0.7%.

It is located in northern-central Algeria in the Sahara and lies along the left bank of the Wadi Mzab. The M'zab in the Ghardaïa Province was made a World Heritage Site in 1982, as a cultural property evaluated under the criteria II (for its settlement affecting urban planning even to the present century), III (for its Ibadi cultural values), and V (a settlement culture which has prevailed to the present century).

Ghardaïa is part of a pentapolis, a hilltop city amongst four others, built almost a thousand years ago in the M’Zab valley. It was founded by the Mozabites, an Ibadi sect of the Berber Muslims.

It is a major centre of date production and the manufacture of rugs and cloths. Divided into three walled sectors, it is a fortified town. At the centre is the historical Mʾzabite area, with a pyramid-style mosque and an arcaded square. Distinctive white, pink, and red houses, made of sand, clay and gypsum, rise in terraces and arcades.

In her 1963 book, La Force des choses, the French existentialist philosopher Simone de Beauvoir described Ghardaïa as "a Cubist painting beautifully constructed".

== Etymology ==
According to J. Delheure, the name Ghardaïa may be derived from the Tamazight root Gh·R·D, meaning "the highest part of the shoulders", "strength", or "authority", giving Taɣərdayt. This interpretation refers to the citadel's location atop the hill.

Other sources, however, state that Taɣərdayt means "plateau located next to the valley", from which the name Ghardaïa is derived.

Alternatively, the name Ghardaïa may derive from a female saint named Daïa, who is said to have lived in a cave (ghār) in the area before it developed into a town inhabited by Ibadi Muslims who had migrated there to escape persecution under the Fatimid Caliphate.

== History ==
The M'Zab valley, in limestone plateau, was inscribed under the UNESCO Heritage List, is a unique conglomeration of five cities confined in area of 75 km^{2} situated 600 km to the south of Algiers, the capital of Algeria.

The original architecture of the semi desert valley is dated to early 11th century. It is ascribed to the Ibadis, with their cultural identity originally traced to the Maghreb; they had their capital at Tahert as an Ibadi Kingdom. They were forced to leave Tahert consequent to a devastating fire in 909 (it is reported that destruction was caused by the founder of the (Shi'ite) Fatimid Dynasty). They first moved to Sedrata and finally to the M'Zab valley. They settled in five fortified villages located on rocky outcrops, known locally as “Kosars”, although they could have lived in one larger village encompassing all the five. The habitation was planned with meticulous details to precise layouts defined by set principles of community living within a defensive environment. Ghardaïa's foundation has been dated to 1048 or 1053.

Each village was planned in a diverse topography comprising a small island, a ridge, a hilltop, a peak and a recess. The villages were fortified in such a manner that they were inaccessible to the nomadic groups. The five villages set up with identical planning concepts were Ghardaïa, Melika, Beni Isguen, Bou Noura and El Atteuf. The identical “miniature citadels”, as they are termed, each had their own mosque with minaret functioning as watch towers, and the houses built around the mosque in concentric circles and surrounded by a high walls (extending up to the ramparts). The buildings together gave the feel of a fortress to each village. The mosque also provided for storage of grains and arms for defence.

However, during the summer season the inhabitants migrated to a "citadel" outside the fortified villages, in an informal setting of artificial palm grove, a cemetery and a mosque.

The ksar was created in 476/1085 by two tribes : the Aoulad Ammi-Aïssa and the Aoulad Ba-Slimane. Each tribe contained different fractions, a specific area and a cemetery. Ghardaïa is the richest city of the M'Zab Vallée. It already had a dynamic commercial and craft activity. On the social aspect, it is the only Ksar, along with Melika, that housed not only Ibadites Berbers, but also Malekits Arabs and a Jewish community until the Algerian Independence.

To build the Ksar, the founders of Ghardaïa, a small group of people, under a Cheikh, chose a hill 200m south of the M'Zab Oued for defensive purposes. Farther west, they created a palm grove for subsistence farming. The Ksar of Ghardaïa, as it is today, did not appear in one time. According to the public agency in charge of protecting the M'Zab Heritage, Ghardaïa has seen four phases of evolution until 1882, when it was annexed by the French army.

== Geography ==
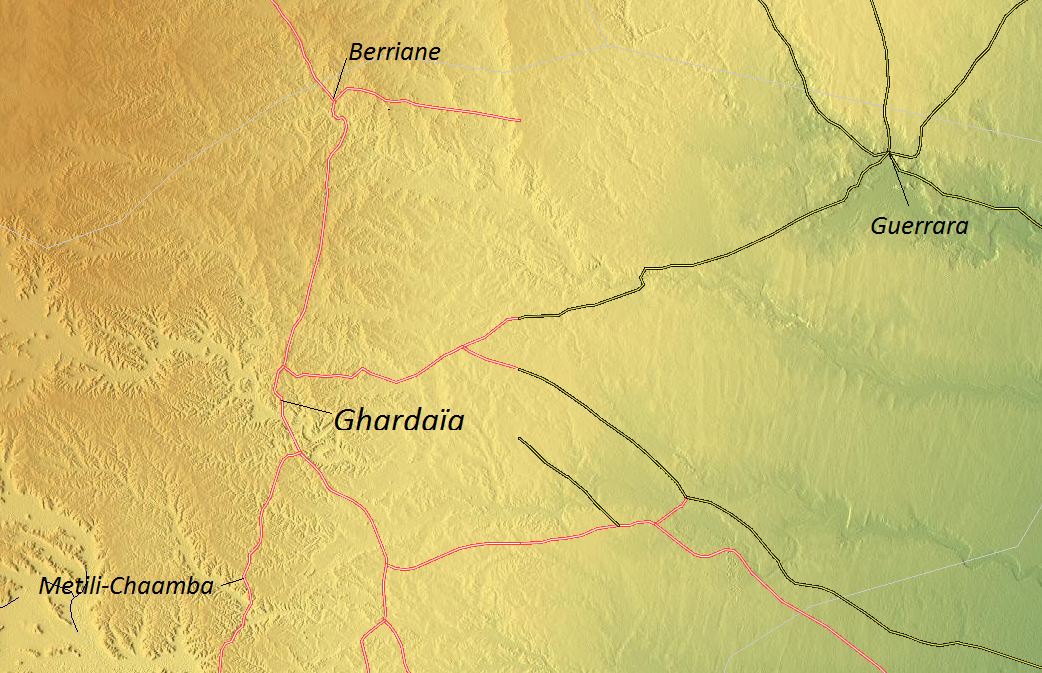
Map of major settlements within the province of Ghardaïa

The city is located within the Sahara Desert in northern-central Algeria. Ghardaïa Province is divided into 13 communes or municipalities, which includes the Ghardaïa municipality. It is bordered by Ouargla and El Bayadh Wilayas. It is nestled in the M'zab valley, lying on the left bank of the Wadi Mzab, which is commonly dry throughout the year. The commune of Ghardaïa now covers an area of 590 km^{2} (230 sq mi) and includes a number of suburbs, towns and villages in addition to Ghardaïa. Suburb settlements include Mélika, Béni Isguen, Bounoura (Has Bunur) and El Atteuf (Tadjnint), all of which lie to the southeast of Ghardaïa city and the ancient ksar of Metlili-Chaamba or Metlili which lies 42 km (26 mi) to the southwest. Outside of the Mzab Valley, Berriane (Has Ibergane) and El Guerrara (Iguerraren) are towns of note, the first 45 km (28 mi) to the north, and the second 110 km (68 mi) to the northeast.

=== Hydrology ===
Ghardaïa's ancient water distribution system was devised by the Mozabites, as a response to the ephemeral flows of its oueds (rivers). Realising the preciousness of this natural resource, the Mozabites developed a unique hydraulic system of tunnels to harvest rainwater and divert it to the oases. They have an equitable water distribution to all gardens and also maintain good flood protection measures. The water supply is accessed in a number of ways through a complex irrigation system that distributes water from many wells. Well drilling extends to a depth ranging from 350 ft (110 m) to 500 ft (150 m), drawing the water from the Albian fossil groundwater continental infill whose reserves are estimated at 1.5 trillion m^{3}.

=== Climate ===
Ghardaïa has a hot desert climate (Köppen climate classification BWh), with extremely hot summers and mild winters. The region is marked by large temperature differences between day and night, and summer and winter ranging from lows of 5 °C (41 °F) to highs of 46 °C (114.8 °F). The prevailing winds of summer are extremely hot, extremely dry and strong, while winter winds are warm and dry. Sandstorms generally occur from March to May. In October 2008, Ghardaïa was severely affected by flooding due to heavy rain.

Climate data for Ghardaïa (1991-2020)
| Month | Jan | Feb | Mar | Apr | May | Jun | Jul | Aug | Sep | Oct | Nov | Dec | Year |
|---|---|---|---|---|---|---|---|---|---|---|---|---|---|
| Record high °C (°F) | 27.2 (81.0) | 35.2 (95.4) | 37.0 (98.6) | 39.7 (103.5) | 43.5 (110.3) | 46.2 (115.2) | 47.4 (117.3) | 46.8 (116.2) | 43.8 (110.8) | 39.8 (103.6) | 33.4 (92.1) | 27.5 (81.5) | 47.4 (117.3) |
| Mean daily maximum °C (°F) | 16.3 (61.3) | 19.0 (66.2) | 22.3 (72.1) | 26.5 (79.7) | 31.5 (88.7) | 37.2 (99.0) | 40.4 (104.7) | 39.8 (103.6) | 34.5 (94.1) | 28.2 (82.8) | 21.3 (70.3) | 17.3 (63.1) | 27.9 (82.2) |
| Daily mean °C (°F) | 10.9 (51.6) | 13.2 (55.8) | 16.3 (61.3) | 20.1 (68.2) | 25.0 (77.0) | 30.4 (86.7) | 33.5 (92.3) | 33.1 (91.6) | 28.3 (82.9) | 22.4 (72.3) | 15.9 (60.6) | 12.0 (53.6) | 21.8 (71.2) |
| Mean daily minimum °C (°F) | 5.5 (41.9) | 7.4 (45.3) | 10.2 (50.4) | 13.6 (56.5) | 18.4 (65.1) | 23.6 (74.5) | 26.5 (79.7) | 26.4 (79.5) | 22.1 (71.8) | 16.6 (61.9) | 10.5 (50.9) | 6.7 (44.1) | 15.6 (60.1) |
| Record low °C (°F) | −0.9 (30.4) | −0.5 (31.1) | 2.2 (36.0) | 4.0 (39.2) | 10.3 (50.5) | 14.9 (58.8) | 20.2 (68.4) | 19.0 (66.2) | 13.5 (56.3) | 5.9 (42.6) | 1.2 (34.2) | 0.2 (32.4) | −0.9 (30.4) |
| Average precipitation mm (inches) | 9.0 (0.35) | 3.3 (0.13) | 9.7 (0.38) | 6.7 (0.26) | 2.8 (0.11) | 2.3 (0.09) | 1.4 (0.06) | 4.6 (0.18) | 17.0 (0.67) | 6.9 (0.27) | 5.4 (0.21) | 6.1 (0.24) | 75.2 (2.96) |
| Average precipitation days (≥ 1.0 mm) | 1.4 | 0.7 | 1.5 | 1.1 | 0.7 | 0.6 | 0.4 | 0.8 | 2.2 | 1.2 | 1.1 | 1.0 | 12.7 |
| Average relative humidity (%) | 54.4 | 45.0 | 39.8 | 35.1 | 30.5 | 25.9 | 22.3 | 25.9 | 36.9 | 45.0 | 50.2 | 54.7 | 38.8 |
| Mean monthly sunshine hours | 248.3 | 245.2 | 273.6 | 298.2 | 325.8 | — | — | 322.6 | 270.2 | 269.3 | — | 240.0 | — |
Source 1: NOAA
Source 2: Climatebase (humidity)

== Layout and architecture ==
The unique layout of the Ghardaïa village is dictated by the rocky terrain of the region. Apart from the mosques and the housing pattern layout, with the mosque at the top of the hill, and the houses laid in labyrinthine alleyways, there is also a large market centre. The houses in particular are oriented in such a way that admits sunlight into every dwelling, as this is strongly believed to be healthy: "Inhabitants of the house where sun comes in will never see a doctor". Chimneys are also set in such a way that they do not encroach upon the comfort of neighbours.

== Economy ==
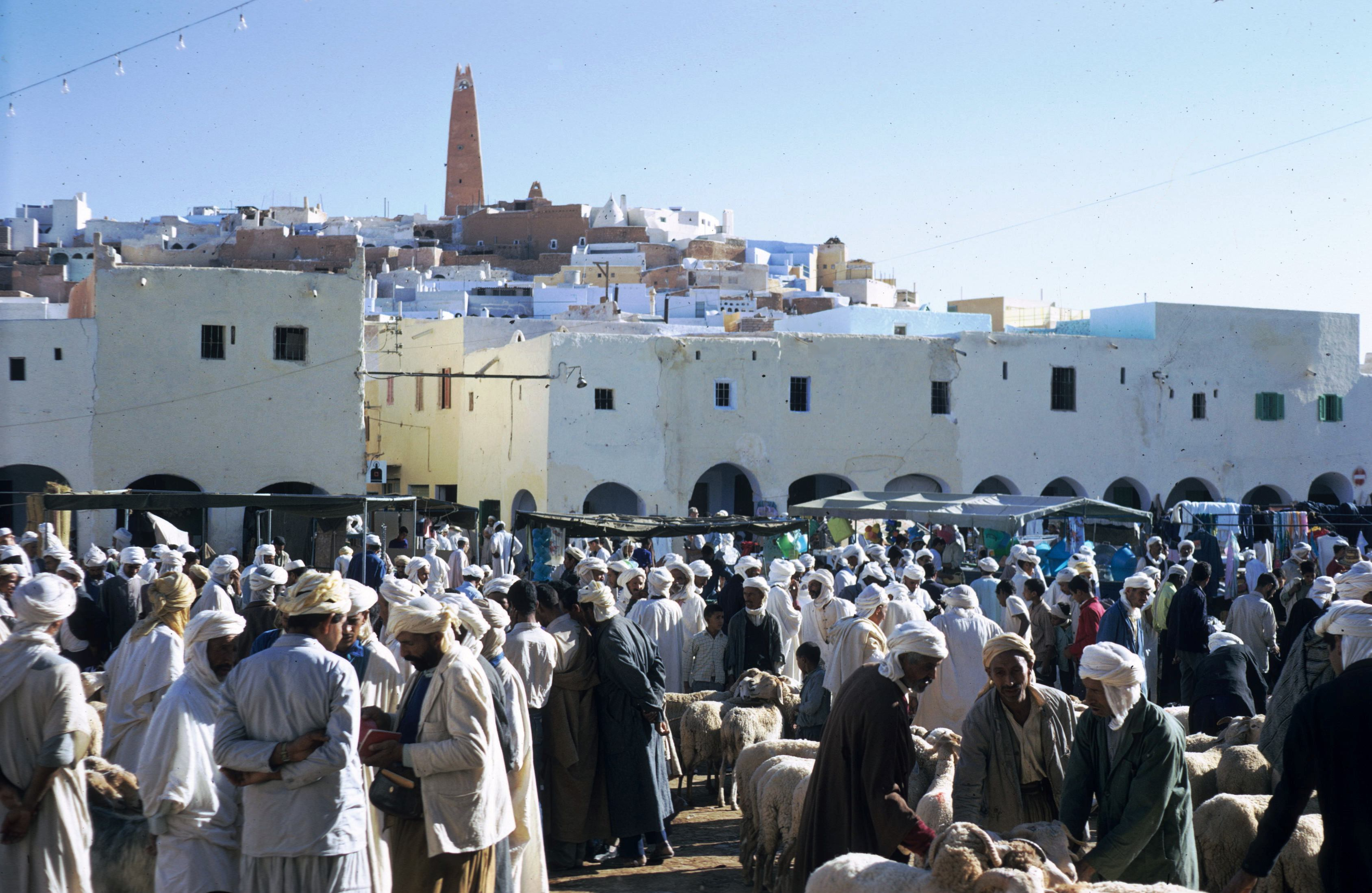
Market on the main square of Ghardaïa (1970)

Ghardaïa is a major centre of date production, with nearly 60,000 palm trees producing dates. The wood of dead palms is used to make house roofs; live trees are not killed, as they are considered living beings that sustain the inhabitants.

Another important industry is the manufacture of rugs and cloths.

Metlili-Chaamba is known for its "Deglet Nour" dates and its camel hair products. One important aspect of the social life and economic values of the people of the region is that begging and theft are non-existent in the community. The society is close-knit, and all aspects of economy and social customs are dictated by the community.

== Culture ==
The residents have preserved the original medieval architecture remarkably well; the valley to which Ghardaïa belongs is part of an official World Heritage Site. The Medabian quarter lies to the northwest. The military compound and hospital are located in the southern area. The city is called "the pearl of the oasis", and is one of the most important tourist regions in southern Algeria due to its ancient cultural heritage. Apart from tourism, the Wilaya of Ghardaïa also draws anthropologists, architects, researchers and historians to explore its rich cultural, anthropological and architectural uniqueness. An interesting aspect of community welfare is the fact that they follow the rules of governance diligently, and also contribute to the maintenance and care of the community. Mozabites in the light of their rigid approach in negotiations, dominate the financial sector, particularly in banking and wholesale sectors. They also have their own mosque, cemetery, recreation and sporting activities. They have a patriarchal system of social inheritance. Another unique feature among the Mozabites is that starting from birth a “Mozabite is looked after by the community for education, work, marriage, and the building of a home. Touiza (groups of volunteers) are organised for building houses.” The Wilaya of Ghardaïa is also well known for its Weaving, Dinanderie D'art, basketry, pottery and carpet weaving (tapestry). The rugs of the area are so popular that every year the "National Day Of Rugs" is held in March.

The Mozabites of Ghardaïa have their distinct identity of traditional costume of saroual loubia (baggy trousers) and chéchia (headgear).

=== Festivals ===
Every spring, the commune of Metlili-Chaamba, 31.3 km (19.4 mi) from Ghardaïa, celebrates the "Day mehr" when people from all over the country attend and participate in a camel race.

In March and April, a carpet festival provides an opportunity for celebration, competition, as well as sales.

=== Religion ===
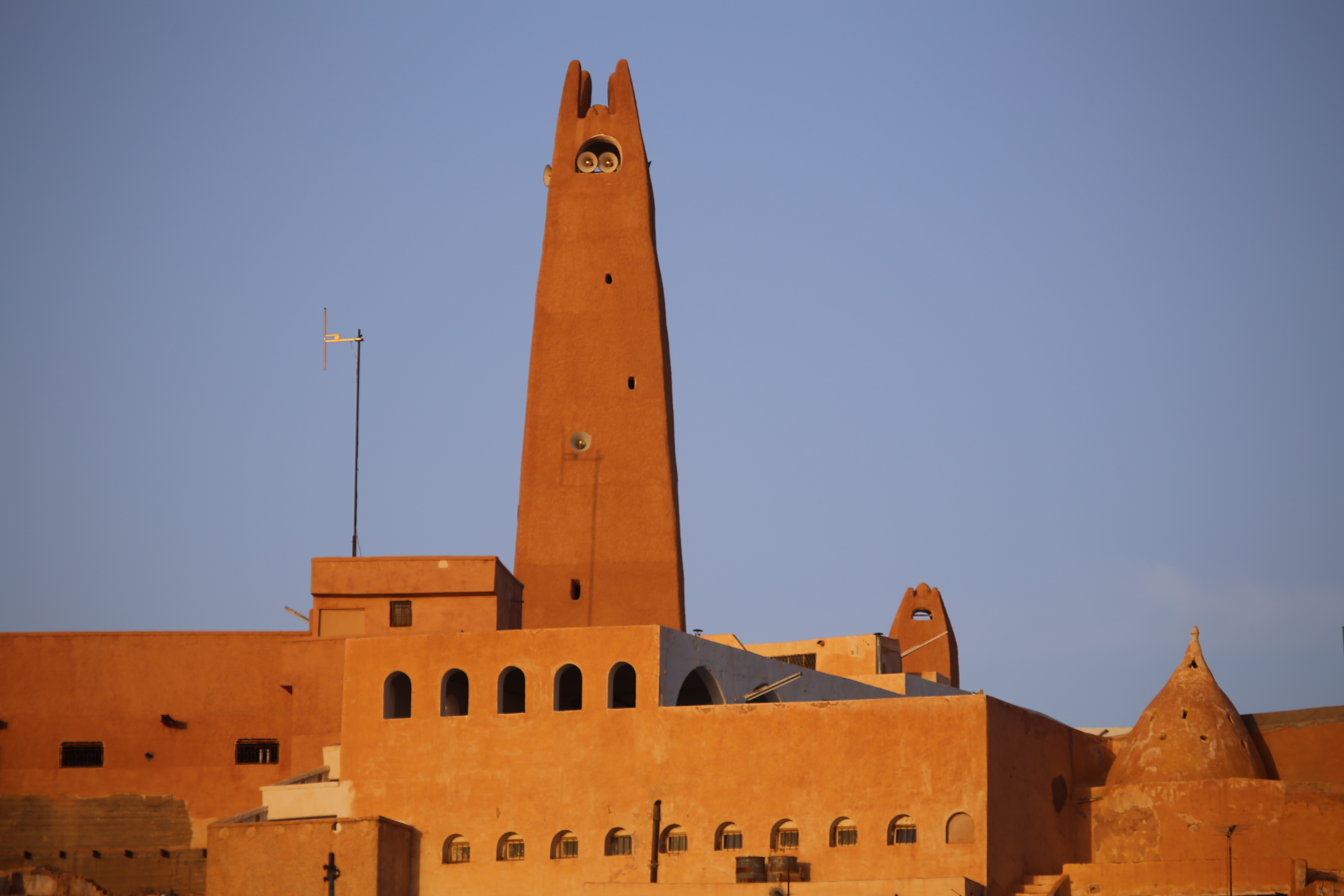
Great mosque of Ghardaia.

Ghardaïa is the traditional heart of the M'zab valley and home of the Ibadi religious sect in Algeria. They do not subscribe to the doctrines of Sunnism and Shi'ism. They practice a different way of praying, worshipping of God, and designing mosques compared to Malikis, who form the majority of Algerians. The wastage of water, and more generally any gift of land, is considered a sin. The Ghardaïa Mosque, built in the 10th century, is of Moorish architecture style. Its tower, simple and elegant, includes a large portal at the top of the shaft, the design of which provides for ventilation flow.

The White Fathers, a Roman Catholic missionary society, live in a hermitage near the old city, and have a collection of books on the Sahara. The pro-cathedral still testifies to the time when it was the seat from 1901 successively of the Apostolic Prefecture of Ghardaïa; the province was renamed as the Apostolic Prefecture of Ghardaïa in the Sahara, in 1948 promoted to the Apostolic Vicariate of Ghardaïa in the Sahara, and then in 1955 was promoted to the Roman Catholic Diocese of Laghouat (where the cathedral is meanwhile secularized; the diocese is still exempt).

=== Jewish Sign Language ===
Until Algerian independence, Ghardaïa was home to a significant Jewish community, of which many were deaf. The deaf Jews of Ghardaïa developed their own village sign language, which they took with them when the community left for France and Israel. The language is considered moribund.

== Education ==
6.5% of the population has a tertiary education, and another 18.2% has completed secondary education. The overall literacy rate is 87.4%, and is 93.2% among males and 81.5% among females.

== Transportation ==
The town is served by Noumérat – Moufdi Zakaria Airport (or simply Ghardaïa airport). There is also a bus station. The airport is named after Algerian writer Moufdi Zakaria, who was born in Ghardaïa.

== Localities ==
The commune of Ghardaïa is composed of nine localities:

- Ghardaia City
- Melika (At M'lichet)
- Theniet El Mekhzene
- Chikh El Hadj Mohammed Hadj Messaoud
- Belghannem
- Chikh Bab Saâd
- El Ghabet
- Chikh baba ou l'djemma

== Notable people from Ghardaïa ==
- Moufdi Zakaria, Mozabite poet from At izjen Beni isgen, authored the national anthem
- Cheikh Bayoud, Mozabite leader of the reformist movement in the south.
- Mokhtar Belmokhtar, Algerian former military commander of al-Mulathameen (The Masked Brigade).

== Gallery ==
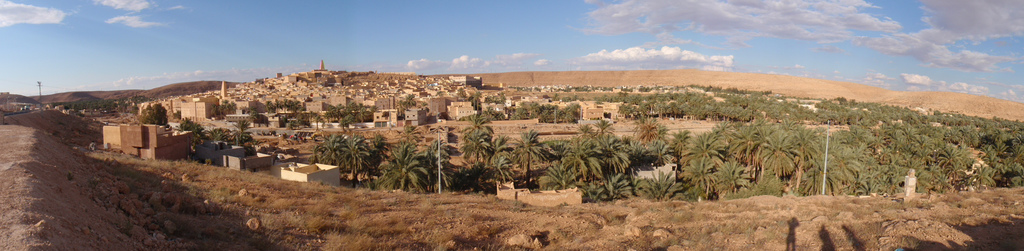
Panorama of Ghardaïa
