= Metlili =

Metlili متليلي
- Commune and town
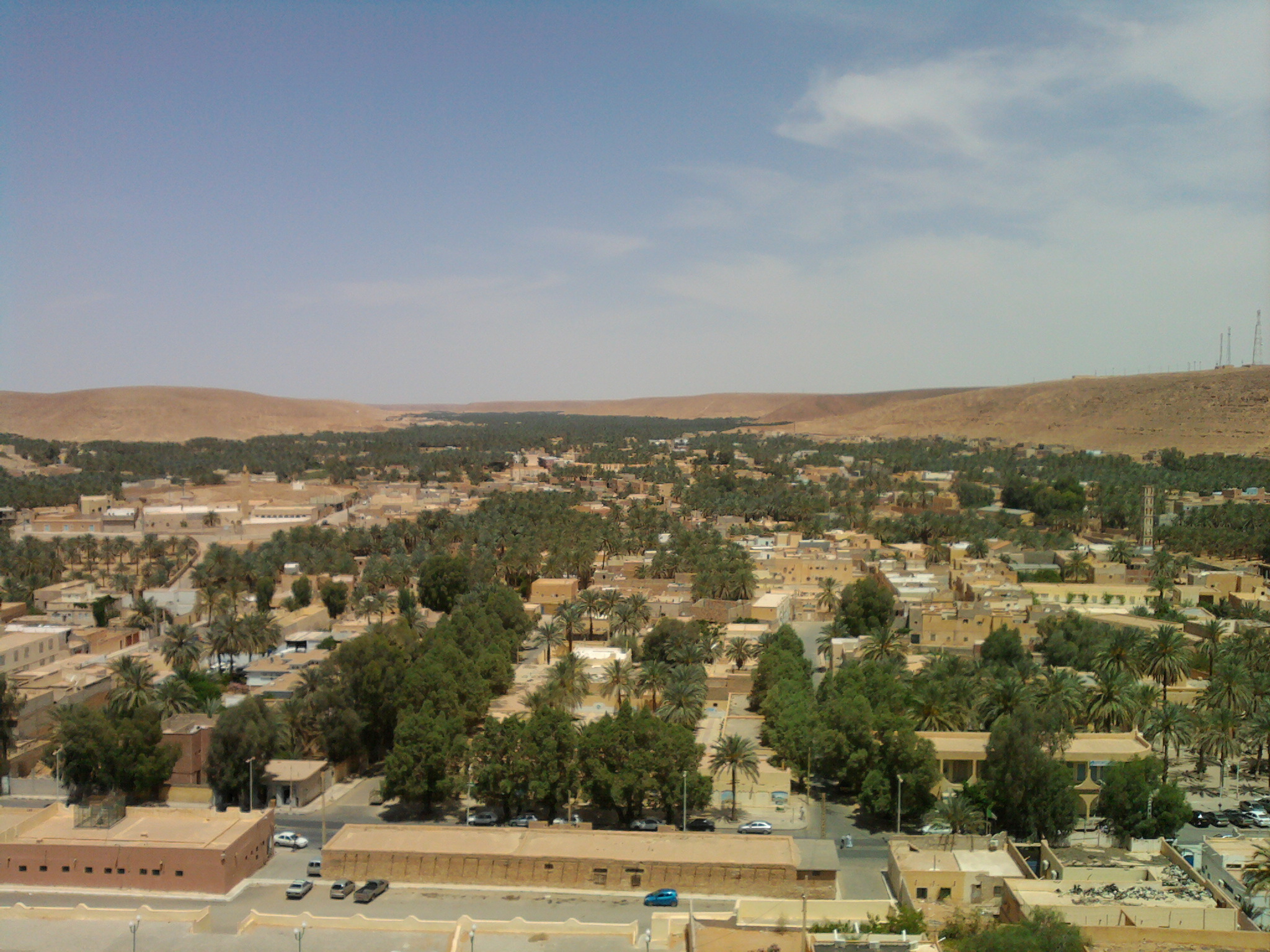
- Metlili

- Location of Metlili commune within Ghardaïa Province

- Location of Metlili within Algeria
- Coordinates: 32°16′22″N 3°37′39″E
- Country: Algeria
- Province: Ghardaïa Province
- District: Métlili District

Area
  - Total: 7,300 km^{2} (2,800 sq mi)
- Elevation: 500 m (1,600 ft)

Population (2008)
  - Total: 40,576
- Time zone: UTC+1 (CET)
- Postal code: 47002

Metlili (Arabic: متليلي) is a town and commune, and capital of Métlili District, in Ghardaïa Province, Algeria. According to the 2008 census it has a population of 40,576, up from 33,759 in 1998, and an annual growth rate of 1.9%.

The population is called Chaanbas (الشعانبة). They descend from the Banu Sulaym Arab tribe. They migrated from Arabia (south of Medina) along with the Banu Hilal tribe in the year 975 AD to Northern Egypt and then in about 1051 AD to north Africa: Libya, Tunisia, Algeria, Morocco.

== Geography ==
Metlili lies at an elevation of about 500 metres (1,600 ft) in a valley running from northwest to southeast between arid, rocky hills. The town is about 12 kilometres (7.5 mi) from end to end, but only about 0.5 kilometres (0.31 mi) wide.

== Climate ==
Metlili has a hot desert climate (Köppen climate classification BWh), with very hot summers and mild winters, and very little precipitation throughout the year.

Climate data for Metlili
Month	Jan	Feb	Mar	Apr	May	Jun	Jul	Aug	Sep	Oct	Nov	Dec	Year
Mean daily maximum °C (°F)	16.3 (61.3)	19.0 (66.2)	22.6 (72.7)	28.1 (82.6)	32.9 (91.2)	38.5 (101.3)	42.6 (108.7)	41.6 (106.9)	35.3 (95.5)	28.0 (82.4)	20.8 (69.4)	16.9 (62.4)	28.6 (83.4)
Daily mean °C (°F)	10.1 (50.2)	12.3 (54.1)	15.7 (60.3)	20.2 (68.4)	24.9 (76.8)	30.2 (86.4)	33.8 (92.8)	33.0 (91.4)	28.2 (82.8)	21.2 (70.2)	14.6 (58.3)	10.7 (51.3)	21.2 (70.3)
Mean daily minimum °C (°F)	4.0 (39.2)	5.7 (42.3)	8.8 (47.8)	12.4 (54.3)	16.9 (62.4)	22.0 (71.6)	25.0 (77.0)	24.5 (76.1)	21.1 (70.0)	14.4 (57.9)	8.5 (47.3)	4.6 (40.3)	14.0 (57.2)
Average precipitation mm (inches)	7 (0.3)	4 (0.2)	10 (0.4)	6 (0.2)	4 (0.2)	2 (0.1)	1 (0.0)	2 (0.1)	5 (0.2)	6 (0.2)	7 (0.3)	7 (0.3)	61 (2.5)
Source: climate-data.org

== Transportation ==
Metlili lies on the N107, a road that connects Noumerat Airport near Ghardaïa in the east to El Bayadh to the northwest. A local road leads south from the town to Sebseb.

== Education ==
8.2% of the population has a tertiary education (the highest in the province), and another 21.7% has completed secondary education. The overall literacy rate is 83.4%, and is 88.6% among males and 78.1% among females.

== Localities ==
The commune of Metlili is composed of seven localities:

- Centre de Metlili
- Noumerat
- Guemgouma
- El Hadika
- Souani
- Chabet Sidi Cheikh
- Souareg
- Chouiket Est

== Notable people from Metlili ==
- Ahmed Benbitour, former Prime Minister of Algeria, economist, and former adviser to the director of the World Bank
- Mustapha Benbada, Minister of Trade.
- Bachir Messaitfa, Professor Specializing in sc. Economic.
