= M'zab =

M'zab Valley
UNESCO World Heritage Site
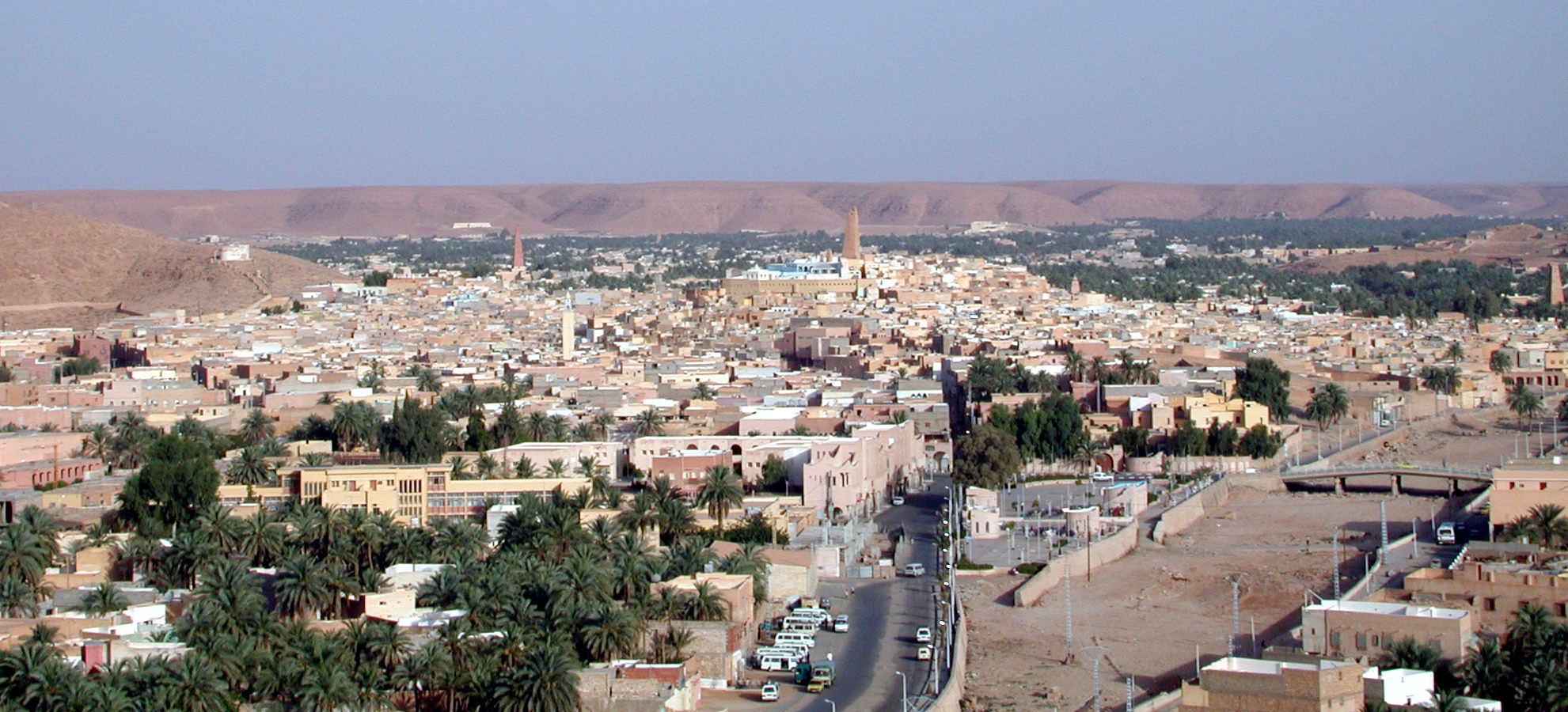
- Panoramic view of Ghardaïa (Tagherdayt) with the dry bed of Wadi M'zab on the right side

- Location within Algeria
- Location: Ghardaïa Province, Algeria
- Criteria: Cultural: (ii), (iii), (v)
- Reference: 188
- Inscription: 1982 (6th Session)
- Area: 665.03 ha (1,643.3 acres)
- Website: www.opvm.dz
- Coordinates: 32°29′N 3°41′E

The M'zab, or Mzab (Mozabite: Aghlan, Arabic: مزاب, romanized: Mzāb), is a natural region of the northern Sahara Desert in Ghardaïa Province, Algeria. It is located 600 km (370 mi) south of Algiers and has approximately 360,000 inhabitants (2005 estimate).

== Geology ==
The M'zab is a limestone plateau, centred on the Wad M'zab (Oued Mzab) valley.

== History ==
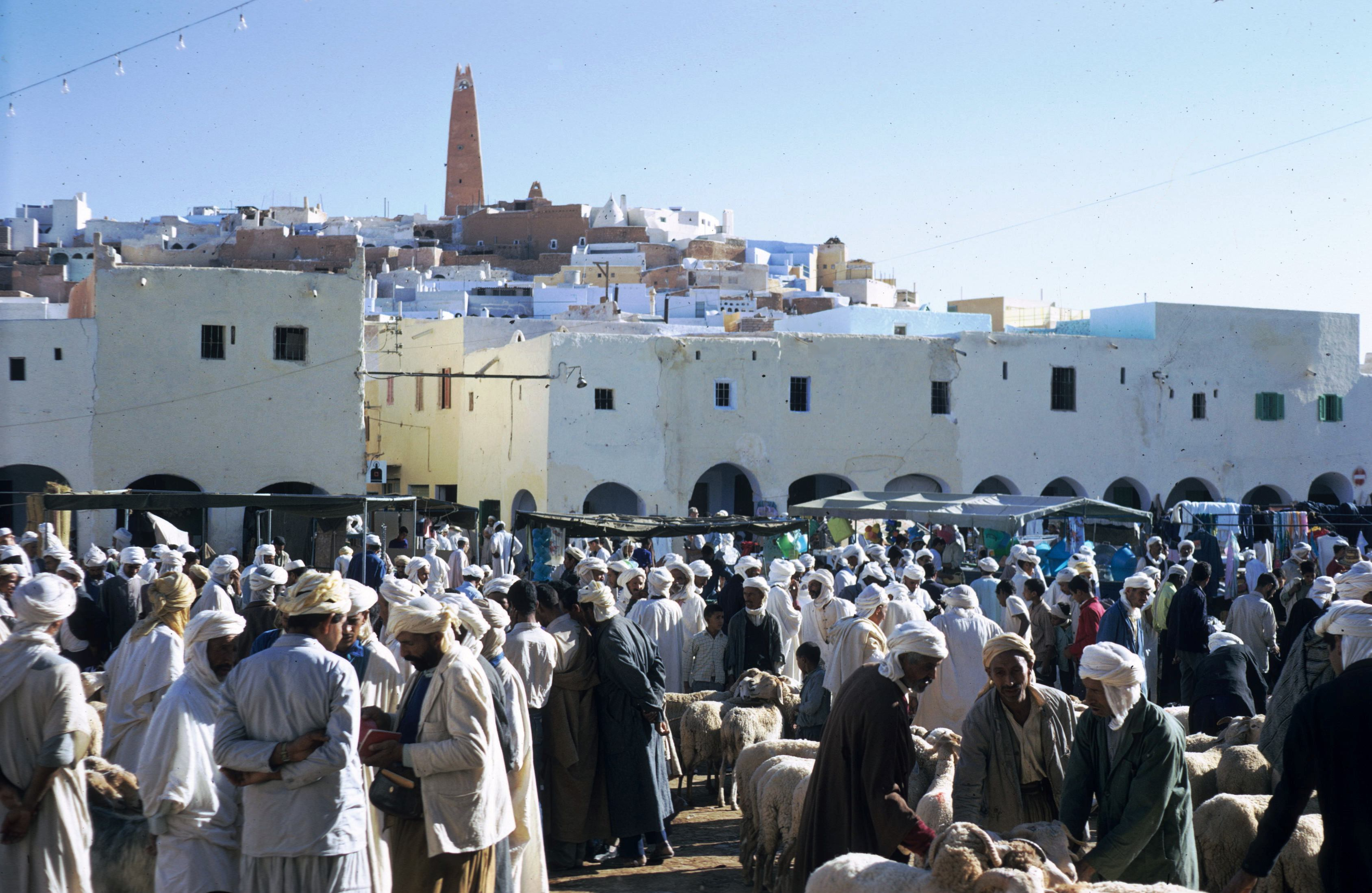
Market on the main square of Ghardaïa in 1970

The Mozabites ("Ath Mzab") are a branch of a large Berber tribe, the Iznaten, which lived in large areas of middle southern Algeria. Many Tifinagh letters and symbols are engraved around the Mzab Valley.

After the Muslim conquest of the Maghreb, the Mozabites became Muslims of the Mu'tazili school. The indigenous Christian population persisted until the 11th century. After the fall of the Rustamid state, the Rustamid royal family with some of their citizens chose the Mzab Valley as their refuge. However, the Rustamids were Ibadi and sent a preacher (Abu Bakr an-Nafusi) who successfully converted the indigenous Mozabites.

France conquered Algeria in 1830. The M'zab was annexed to France only in 1882 and reverted to Algerian indigenous rule in summer 1962 upon its national independence. Ghardaia (Taghardait) is the main town and capital of the M'zab, and El Atteuf is the oldest settlement in the region. Beni Isguen is the most sacred Berber Islamic town. It prohibits all non-M'zabites from various sections of the town, and all foreigners from spending the night within its walls. Melika contains spacious cemeteries and a historical Mosque in the centre of the ksar, and Bounoura is a historical ksar which contain Azwil palm grove, while El Guerrara and Berriane have been part of the M'zab since the 17th century.

== Architecture ==
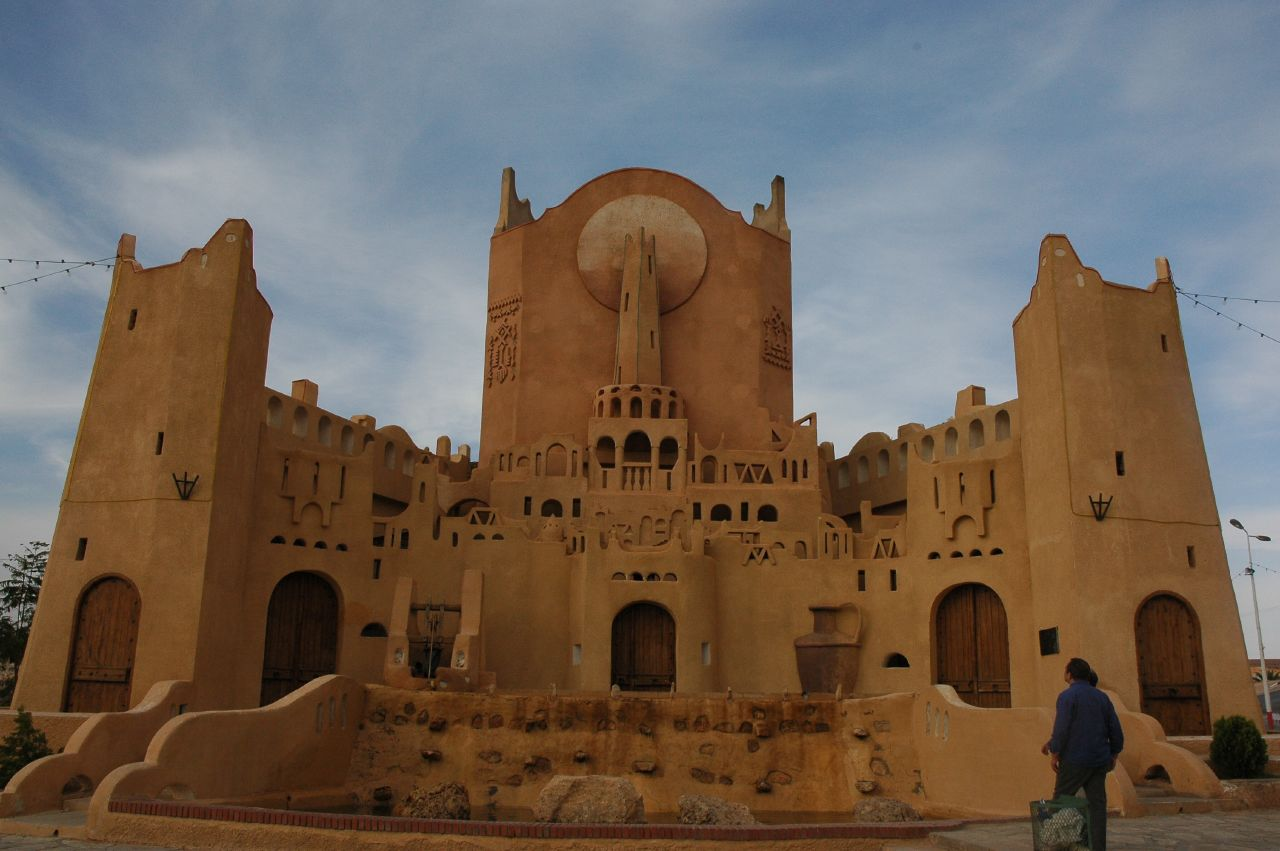
Bounoura roundabout

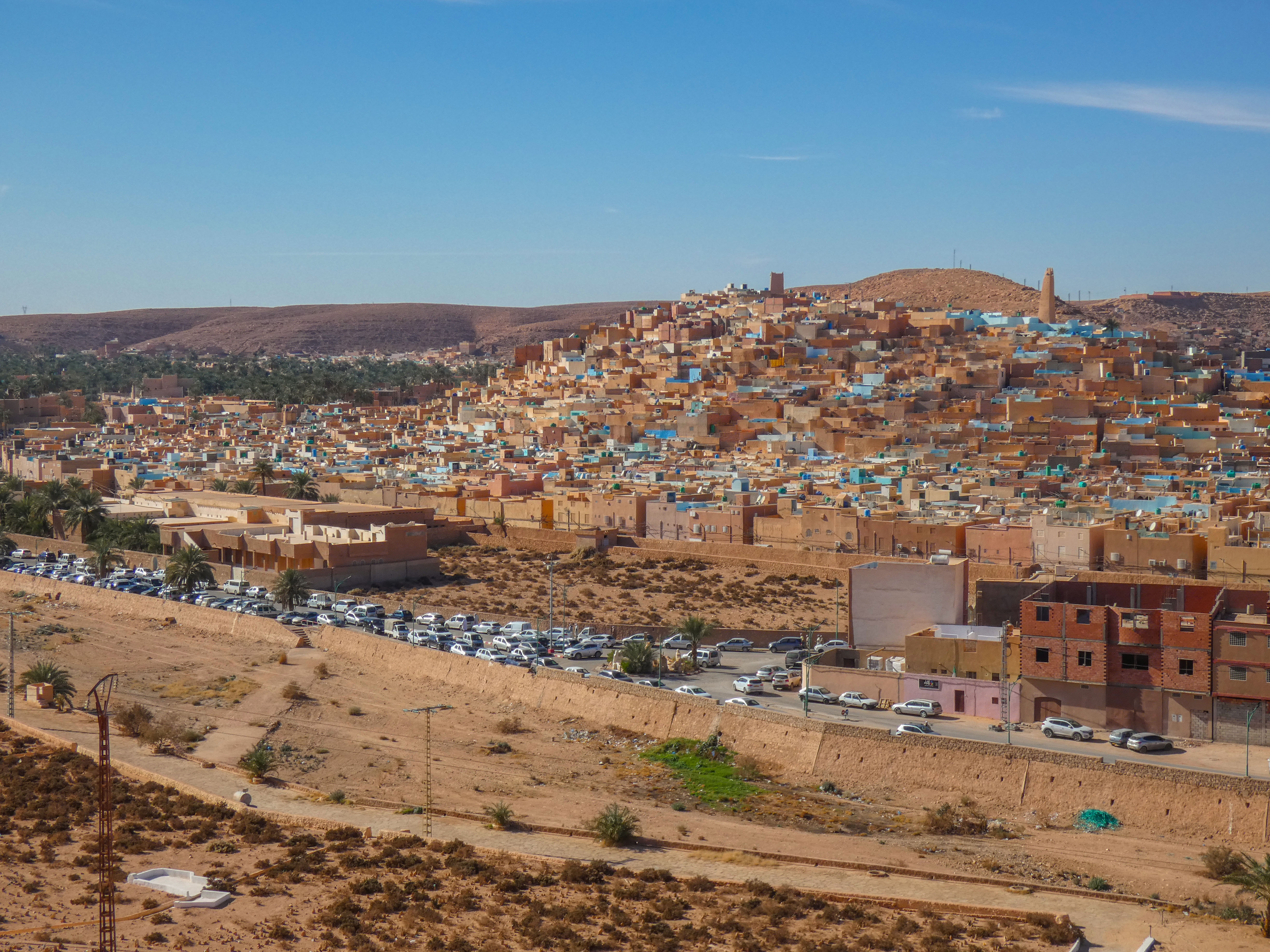
Beni Isguen ksar

There are five qsur "walled villages" (ksour) located on rocky outcrops along the Wəd Mzab collectively known as the Pentapolis, founded between 1012 and 1350. They are: Ghardaïa (Tagherdayt), the principal settlement today; Beni Isguen (At Isjen) (Arabic: بني يزقن); Melika (At Mlishet); Bounoura (At Bunur); and El Atteuf (Tajnint), the oldest of the five settlements. Adding the more recent settlements of Bérianne and El Guerrara, the Mzab Heptapolis is completed.

The combination of the functional purism of the Ibāḍī faith with the way of life necessary near an oasis has led to a strict organization of land and space. Each citadel has a fortress-like mosque, whose minaret served as a watchtower. Houses of standard size and type were constructed in concentric circles around the mosque. The architecture of the M'zab settlements was designed for egalitarian communal living, with respect for family privacy. The M'zab building style is of Libyan-Phoenician type, more specifically of Berber style and has been replicated in other parts of the Sahara. In the summer, the M'zabites migrated to 'summer citadels' centred on palm grove oases. That is one of the major oasis groups of the Sahara Desert and is bounded by arid country known as chebka, crossed by dry river beds.

The M'zab Valley was listed as a UNESCO World Heritage Site in 1982, as an intact example of traditional human habitat perfectly adapted to the environment.

== Society ==
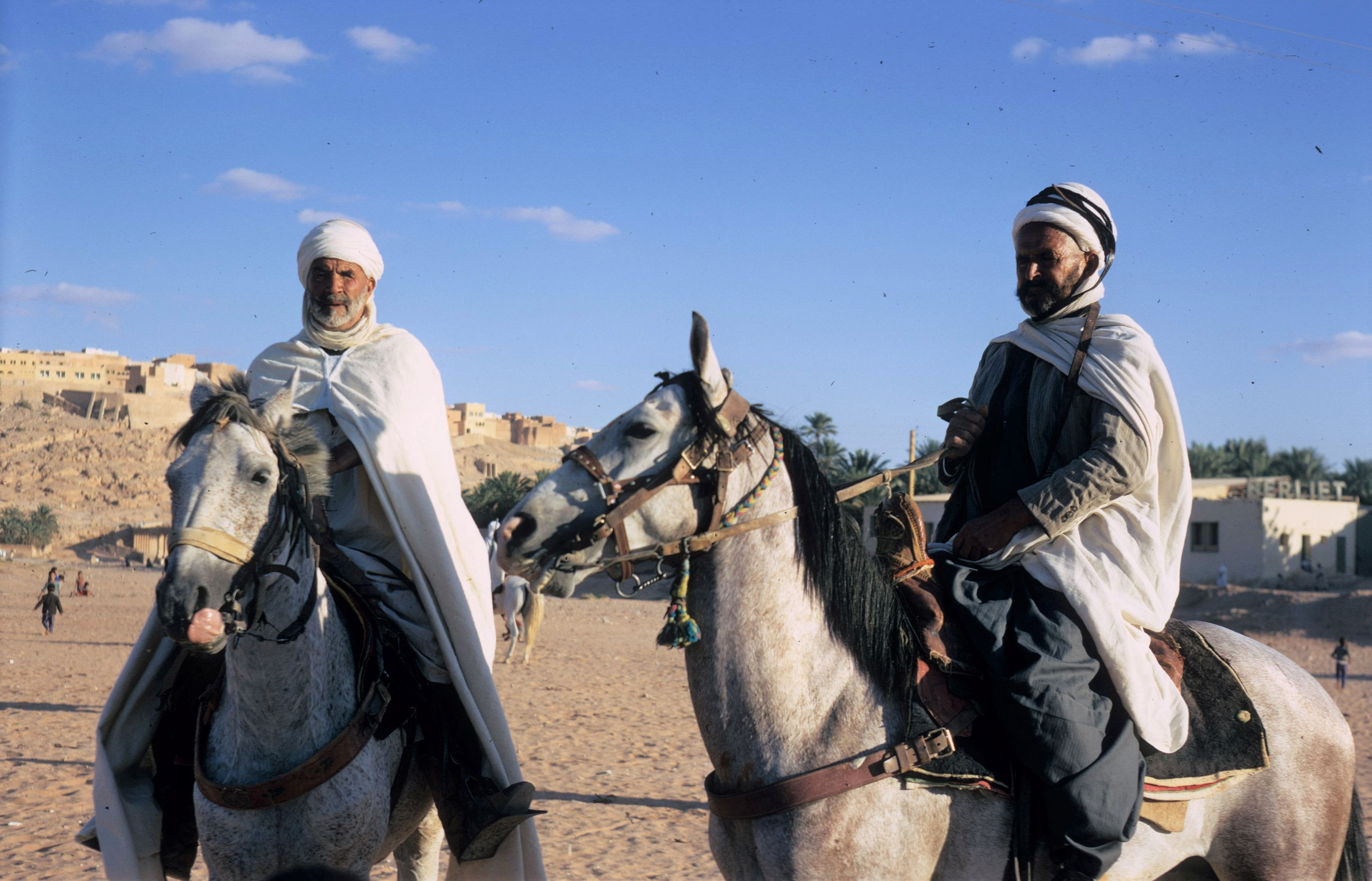
Mozabite horsemen in Ghardaia.

The insular nature of the Ibāḍiyya has preserved the area, and Ibāḍī Sezzaba continue to dominate the social life of the area. A federal council, Majlis Ammi Said, unites representatives of the seven settlements as well as Ouargla, an ancient town located 200 km South-East of the Mzab valley. This council forms a federative body for religious, social and, increasingly, cultural matters. The religious federal council represents an “Islamic type of government” that is unique today.

Numerous details of Ibāḍiyya social life are ruled by this Islamic government, such as the weight of gold given as a dowry to a woman (maximum 60 g) to the length of wedding celebrations (three days). The council makes decisions on details such as dowries, celebrations, dress. It used to impose punishments including exile and a form of tabriyya "quarantine" in which the offender may not interact with his fellow citizens. However, with economic, social and political integration to Algeria, those sanctions are less effective, and tend to have more impact on women.

The local language of the Mozabites is Mozabite (Tumẓabt), a branch of the Zenati group of Berber languages.

Ghardaya is also one of the four large military and administrative territories into which southern Algeria is divided.

== Demographics ==
The Sezzaba are Ibadis.

== Notable people ==
- Moufdi Zakaria, Algerian poet, author of the National Anthem.

== See also ==
- Ibadism in the Maghreb
