= Adjadja =

- Village
- Location within Algeria
- Coordinates: 31°57′4″N 5°23′13″E
- Country: Algeria
- Province: Ouargla Province
- District: Sidi Khouiled District
- Commune: Ain Beida
- Elevation: 134 m (440 ft)
- Time zone: UTC+1 (CET)

Adjadja is a village in the commune of Ain Beida, in Sidi Khouiled District, Ouargla Province, Algeria. The village is located 1 kilometre (0.62 mi) northwest of Ain Beida and 5.5 kilometres (3.4 mi) east of the provincial capital Ouargla.
