= Sidi Khouiled =

Sidi Khouiled ﺳﻴﺪي ﺧﻮﻳﻠﺪ
- Commune and town

- Location within Algeria
- Coordinates: 31°58′47″N 5°25′6″E
- Country: Algeria
- Province: Ouargla Province
- District: Sidi Khouiled District

Area
  - Total: 131 km^{2} (51 sq mi)
- Elevation: 159 m (522 ft)

Population (2008)
  - Total: 8,803
  - Density: 67.2/km^{2} (174/sq mi)
- Time zone: UTC+1 (CET)

Sidi Khouiled (Arabic: ﺳﻴﺪي ﺧﻮﻳﻠﺪ) is a town and commune, and capital of Sidi Khouiled District, in Ouargla Province, Algeria. It is located near the provincial capital, Ouargla. According to the 2008 census it had a population of 8,803, up from 4,309 in 1998, and an annual population growth rate of 7.6%, the highest in the province.

== Geography ==
Sidi Khouiled lies at an elevation of 159 metres (522 ft) above sea level, 9 kilometres (5.6 mi) from the provincial capital Ouargla. The land in the area alternates between sand dunes and flat rocky plains with small areas of fertile oases. Sidi Khouiled is encircled by small palm plantations built upon these oases.

== Climate ==
The climate is dry, with frequent high winds, and very hot temperatures in summer.

== Transportation ==
Sidi Khouleid is connected by local roads to Ouargla to the west, as well as the towns of Ain Beida to the south and Hassi Ben Abdellah to the northeast. From Ouargla the N49 national highway connects to Ghardaia to the west and Hassi Messaoud to the east, while the N56 connects (via the N3) to Biskra to the north.

The commune contains 7 kilometres (4.3 mi) of national roads, 21.6 kilometres (13.4 mi) of provincial roads, and 6 kilometres (3.7 mi) of municipal roads.

== Infrastructure ==
Access to drinking water is available to 90% of the population, and 85% can use the sewer system. 97% have access to electricity, and 85% have access to gas.

== Localities ==
The commune is composed of three localities:

- Sidi Khouiled
- Oum Raneb
- Aouinet Moussa
