= Rhoud El Baguel =

Rhourde El Baguel
- Village
- Location within Algeria
- Coordinates: 31°22′58″N 6°57′22″E
- Country: Algeria
- Province: Ouargla Province
- District: El Borma District
- Commune: El Borma
- Elevation: 155 m (509 ft)
- Time zone: UTC+1 (CET)

Rhourde El Baguel is a village in the commune of El Borma, in El Borma District, Ouargla Province, Algeria. The village is located 93 kilometres (58 mi) southeast of Hassi Messaoud and 166 kilometres (103 mi) southeast of the provincial capital Ouargla.
