= Mining industry of Algeria =

Hydrocarbons are the leading sector in Algeria's mineral industry, which includes diverse but modest production of metals and industrial minerals. In 2006, helium production in Algeria accounted for about 13% of total world output. Hydrocarbons produced in Algeria accounted for about 2.9% of total world natural gas output and about 2.2% of total world crude oil output in 2006. Algeria held about 21% of total world identified resources of helium, 2.5% of total world natural gas reserves, and about 1% of total world crude oil reserves.

In 2019, the country was the 17th largest world producer of gypsum, and the 19th largest world producer of phosphate.

== History ==
Some minerals, such as high-grade iron ore, phosphate, mercury, and zinc, have been exported since the early 1970s. The state mining and prospecting corporation, the National Company for Mineral Research and Exploration (Société Nationale de Recherches et d'Exploitations Minières), was established in 1967. As a result of the government's decentralization policy, the company was restructured in 1983 into separate production and distribution entities. The most important of these were an iron ore and phosphate company known as Ferphos, which had three production units and a port complex at Annaba, and another company called Erem that specialized in conducting mineral research at Boumerdès on the Mediterranean, and Tamanrasset in the south.

== Legal framework ==
The mineral industry is managed primarily by the Ministère de l'Énergie et des Mines (Ministry of Energy and Mines) and subsidiary organizations, such as the Agence Nationale du Patrimoine Minier (ANPM) (National Agency for Mining Endowment). Processed mineral commodities, such as cement, fertilizers, and steel, are under the jurisdiction of the Ministère de l'Industrie et de la Restructuration (Ministry of Industry and Restructuring).

Nonfuel mineral operations were regulated by law No. 01-10 of July 3, 2001, and associated decrees. Natural gas and petroleum operations were regulated by law No. 05-07 of April 28, 2005. Environmental laws applicable to the mineral industry included law No. 03-10 of July 19, 2003, and associated decrees, and law No. 05-12 of September 4, 2005.

== Economic impact ==
Revenue attributed to natural gas and petroleum production, processing, and sales activity accounted for 78% of 2006 government income. Hydrocarbon activity accounted for more than 33% of the nation's 2006 gross domestic product (GDP). The continued increase of international crude oil and natural gas prices resulted in a significant increase in the value of Algerian exports, most of which were shipped through the country's eight main seaports or exported by pipeline. In 2006, Algerian exports of goods and services were valued at $57.3 billion, of which hydrocarbons accounted for about $53.6 billion, compared with 2005, when exports of goods and services were valued at $48.8 billion, of which hydrocarbons accounted for about $45.6 billion. Other mineral commodity exports included base metals (about $206 million), iron and steel ($197 million), industrial minerals (about $52 million), and precious minerals (about $4 million).

About 28,000 people were employed in the mining sector, of which slightly less than one-half was in the private sector. Aggregate and stone production companies accounted for more than 60% of the mining sector workforce; clay production companies, 12%; phosphate production companies, 6%; and iron ore production companies, 5%.

== Production ==
Several significant changes in production were posted in 2006. Mineral commodities with notable production increases included aggregate and crushed stone, barite, cement, dolomite, feldspar, iron ore, phosphate rock, salt, construction sand, and steel. Mineral commodities with notable production decreases included ammonia, gold, gypsum, helium, pozzolan, quartzite, silica sand, silver, and zinc.

== Structure of the mineral industry ==
About 950 nonfuel mineral operations were active in Algeria in 2006, of which nearly 70% were aggregates, construction sand, or crushed stone operations. Private-sector companies dominated the aggregate, common clay, gypsum, and sand sectors. Large- and medium-sized public-sector enterprises dominated the ranks of barite, bentonite, cement, natural gas, petroleum, and phosphate rock producers. The joint ventures of private and state-owned companies dominated the gold production sector, the helium production sector (Helios s.p.a.), and the steel production sector (Mittal Steel Annaba s.p.a.).

In late 2006, the government offered to sell its majority interests in Société des Mines de Baryte d'Algérie s.p.a., Société des Diatomites d'Algérie s.p.a., and Société des Feldspaths d'Algérie s.p.a. [all of which were subsidiaries of state-owned Entreprise Nationale des Produits Miniers Non Ferreux & des Substances Utiles, s.p.a. (ENOF)]. In 2006, ENOF closed the Chabet El Hamra zinc mine, and Société des Kaolins d'Algérie s.p.a. (which was an ENOF subsidiary) closed the Djebel Debbagh kaolin pit.

== Commodities ==
In 2006, about 300 exploration permits were in effect. Notable exploration and development and redevelopment contracts under negotiation included those with subsidiaries of the Mineral Resources Management Bureau of Henan Province, China for the Boukaïs copper prospect, the Boukhedma-Aïn Sedjra-Kef Semmah lead zinc prospects, the El Abed zinc prospect, the Guettara manganese prospect, and the Issefane gold prospect. Western Mediterranean Zinc s.p.a., which was a joint venture of Terramin Australia Ltd. (65% interest) and ENOF (35% interest), acquired the rights to explore the Oued Amizour zinc project.

=== Gold ===
ENOR produced 38,914 metric tons [t] (38,299 long tons; 42,895 short tons) of ore with an average grade of 9.57 grams per metric ton gold from the Tirek Mine in 2006, which was significantly less than the 65,718 t (64,680 long tons; 72,442 short tons) of ore that the company mined in 2005. The decline was attributed to the delayed delivery of equipment. Development of the Amesmessa Mine continued; production was expected to begin in 2007.

=== Lead, silver, and zinc ===
Assays of samples from a 5-hole drilling program at the Tan Chaffao deposit by Tan Chaffao Mining Co. S.A.R.L., which was a joint venture of Maghreb Minerals PLC of the United Kingdom (85% interest) and Gold and Industrial Minerals [GOLDIM] [which was a subsidiary of the Government-owned Office National de la Recherche Géologique et Minière (15%)] indicated less than expected mineralization. At year end, the joint venture was reevaluating whether to continue exploration of the isolated Tan Chaffao deposit, which is about 250 kilometres [km] (160 mi) northwest of Tamanrasset.

In late 2006, Western Mediterranean Zinc began a drilling program on the Tala Hamza deposit of the Oued Amizour zinc project. Tala Hamza was about 12 km (7.5 mi) southwest of the Port of Béjaïa.

=== Helium and liquefied natural gas ===
In 2006, the testing of the Helison Production s.p.a. plant at the GL1K liquefied natural gas (LNG) facility in Skikda resulted in the plant's initial liquid helium production. Designed with a nominal production capacity of 16 million cubic metres (570×10^{6} cu ft) per year of liquid helium, the plant capacity would be restricted to 8 million cubic metres (280×10^{6} cu ft) per year because of an explosion and fire that destroyed three LNG trains at Skikda in 2004. The construction of an LNG train with a capacity of 4.5 million metric tons (4,400,000 long tons; 5,000,000 short tons) per year at the GL1K facility (to replace the destroyed LNG trains) was expected to begin in 2007.

=== Petroleum and natural gas ===
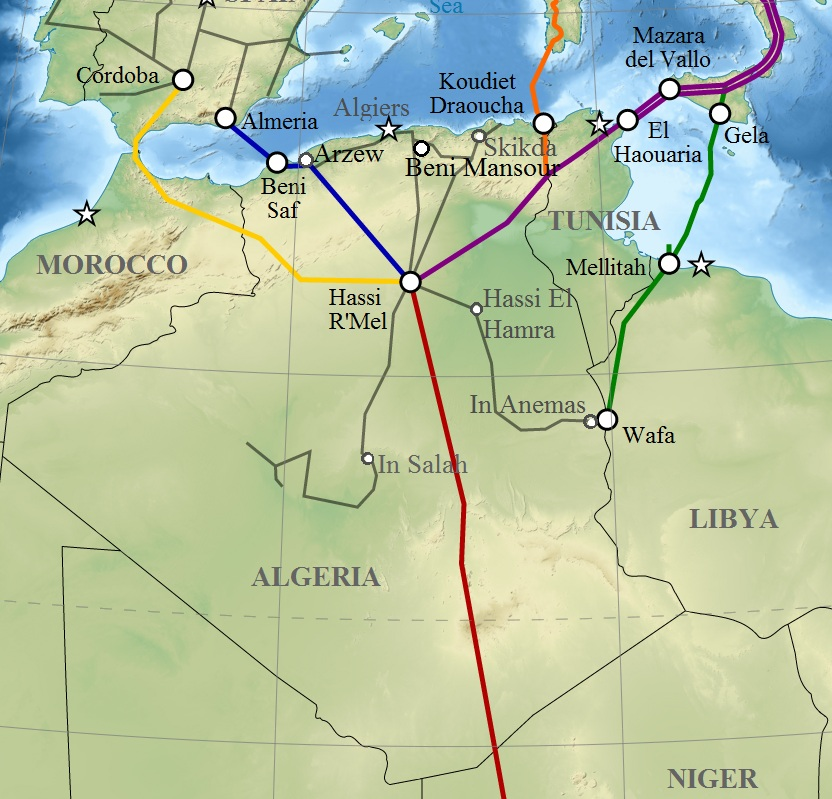
Map of Algeria showing pipelines

Giant petroleum fields include the Hassi R'Mel gas field and the Hassi Messaoud oil field. High international crude oil and natural gas prices encouraged stepped-up exploration and development drilling in Algeria. The number of exploration wells drilled in 2006 increased to 77 compared with 64 in 2005 and 36 in 2001. The number of development wells drilled in 2006 increased to 208 compared with 161 in 2005 and 175 in 2001.

Existing and expected local and European high demand for oil and gas has resulted in the construction and planning of a number of pipelines in Algeria:

==== Oil pipelines ====
- Beni Mansour to Algiers
- Haoud El Hamra to Béjaïa
- Haoud El Hamra to Skikda
- Haoud El Hamra to Arzew
- In Amenas to Haoud El Hamra
- Rhourde El Bagel to Haoud El Hamra
- Trapsa oil Pipeline from Zarzaitine/Edjeleh to La Skhirra in Tunisia
- El Borma to La Skhirra in Tunisia

==== Gas pipelines ====
- Algiers to Arzew
- Annaba to Skikda
- Béjaïa to Skikda
- Haoud El Hamra to Arzew
- Hassi Messaoud to Has si R'Mel
- Has si R'Mel to Skikda
- Has si R'Mel to Algiers
- Has si R'Mel to Arzew
- In Amenas to Hassi Messaoud
- In Salah to Has si R'Mel
- Part of Algeria-Italy Gas Pipeline via Sardinia from Has si R'Mel field to El Kala
- Maghreb–Europe Gas Pipeline from Has si R'Mel to Tarifa in Spain
- Medgaz from Beni Saf to Almería in Spain
- El Borma to Gabès in Tunisia
- Trans-Mediterranean Pipeline, from Has si R'Mel to Bologna, Italy, transiting through Tunisia
- Algeria-Italy Gas Pipeline via Sardinia from El Kala to Cagliari (Sardinia) [proposed]
- Trans-Saharan Pipeline from Warri in Nigeria to Arzew [proposed]

==== Products pipelines ====
- Has si R'Mel to Eldoret
- Has si R'Mel to Hassi Messaoud

== Outlook ==
Owing to its hydrocarbon resources and associated infrastructure and its location close to Europe (which was the major market for its minerals), Algeria's hydrocarbon sector is expected to continue to attract foreign direct investment. Continued high international commodity prices were expected to encourage continued domestic and international interest in the Government's program to partially divest its ownership interest in nonfuel mineral operations.

Successful mineral fuel and nonfuel mineral exploration could result in increased mineral commodity development opportunities. The government proposes to increase oil production (subject to production quotas of the OPEC) and to increase natural gas exports by 2010.
