= Chott, Algeria =

Chott
- Village
- Location within Algeria
- Coordinates: 31°57′44″N 5°23′20″E
- Country: Algeria
- Province: Ouargla Province
- District: Sidi Khouiled District
- Commune: Ain Beida
- Elevation: 133 m (436 ft)
- Time zone: UTC+1 (CET)

Chott is a village in the commune of Ain Beida, in Sidi Khouiled District, Ouargla Province, Algeria. The village is located 2.5 kilometres (1.6 mi) north of Ain Beida and 5 kilometres (3.1 mi) east of the provincial capital Ouargla.
