= Tugurt language =

Zenati Berber language spoken in Algeria

Tugurt
- Oued Righ Berber
- تاشلحيت Tašəlḥit
- Native to: Algeria
- Region: Oued Righ (wilaya of Ouargla)
- Native speakers: 8,400 (2022)
- Language family: Afro-Asiatic: Berber; Northern; Zenati; Mzab–Wargla; Tugurt

Language codes
- ISO 639-3: tjo
- Glottolog: tema1243
- ELP: Tahshanit
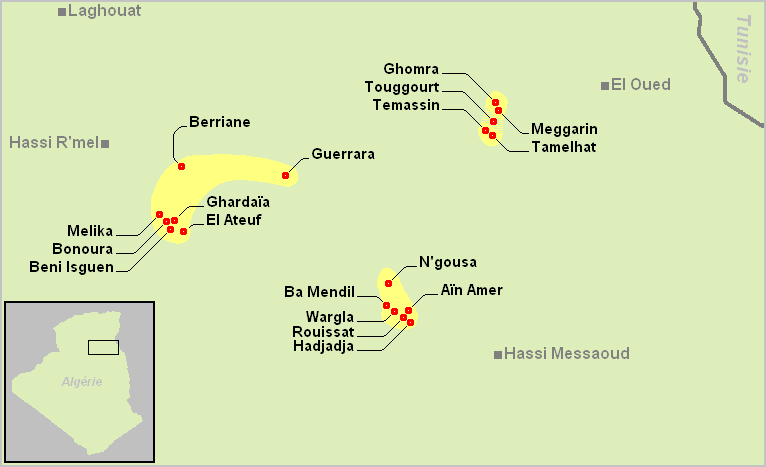
- Berber-speaking areas of the Mzab, Ouargla, and Oued Righ

Tugurt, also known as Oued Righ Berber and Temacine Tamazight, is a Zenati Berber variety spoken in some of the oases of the northeastern Oued Righ region around Touggourt in Algeria. As of 1893, its main speech area was in Temacine, Blidet-Amor, Meggarine and Ghomra. It is closely related to the nearby Tumzabt (Mozabite) and Teggargrent (Ouargli) languages.
