= Ouargla tramway =

Tram network serving Ouargla, Algeria

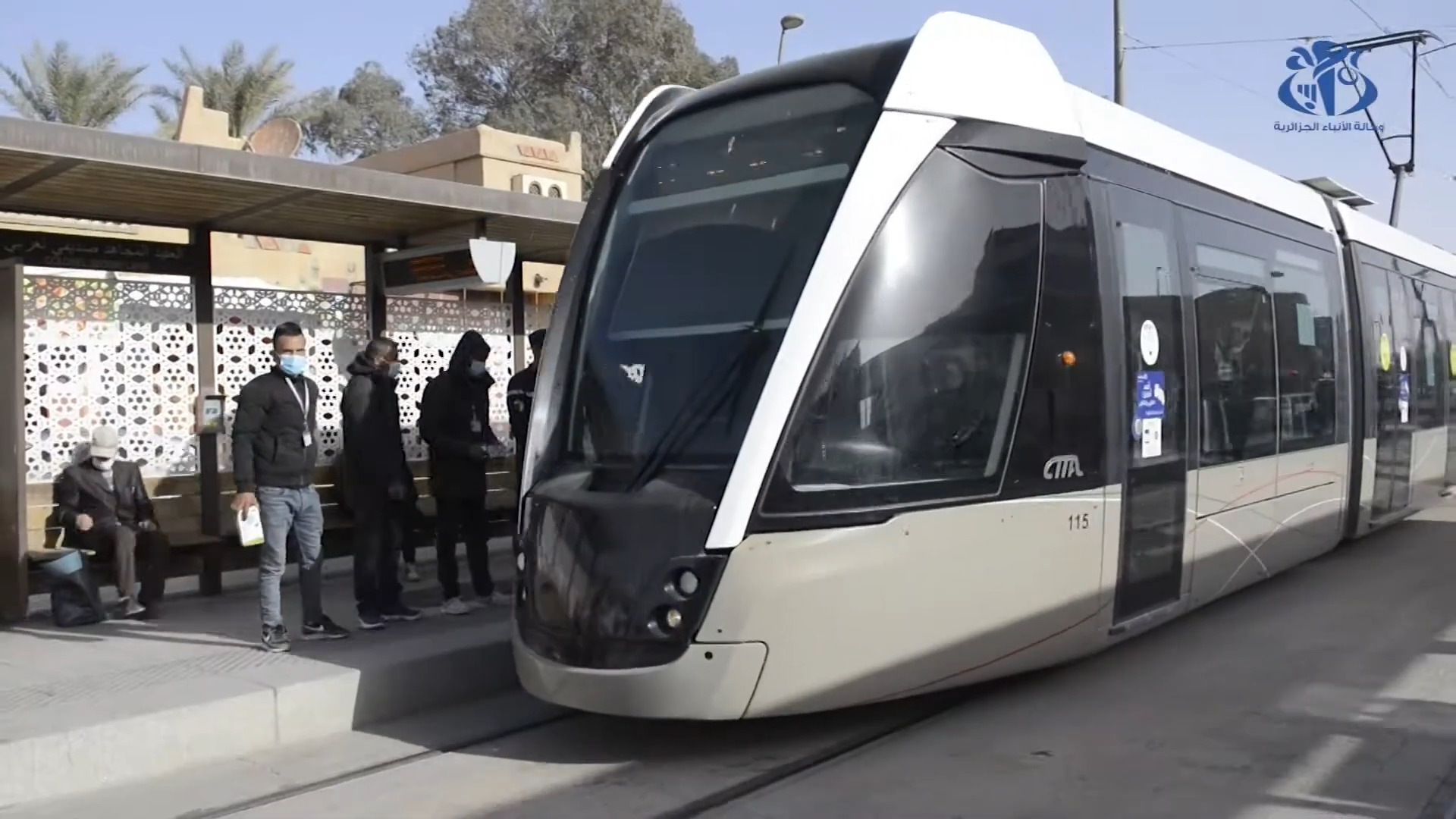
- An Alstom/Cital Citadis 402 tram at Colonel Seddiki Larbi station, 2022

Overview
- Native name: ترامواي ورقلة
- Owner: Entreprise Métro d'Alger (EMA)
- Locale: Ouargla, Algeria
- Transit type: Tram
- Number of lines: 1
- Number of stations: 16
- Website: Official website

Operation
- Began operation: 20 March 2018
- Operator: SETRAM

Technical
- System length: 9.6 km (6.0 mi)
- Track gauge: 1,435 mm (4 ft 8 1/2 in) standard gauge
System map
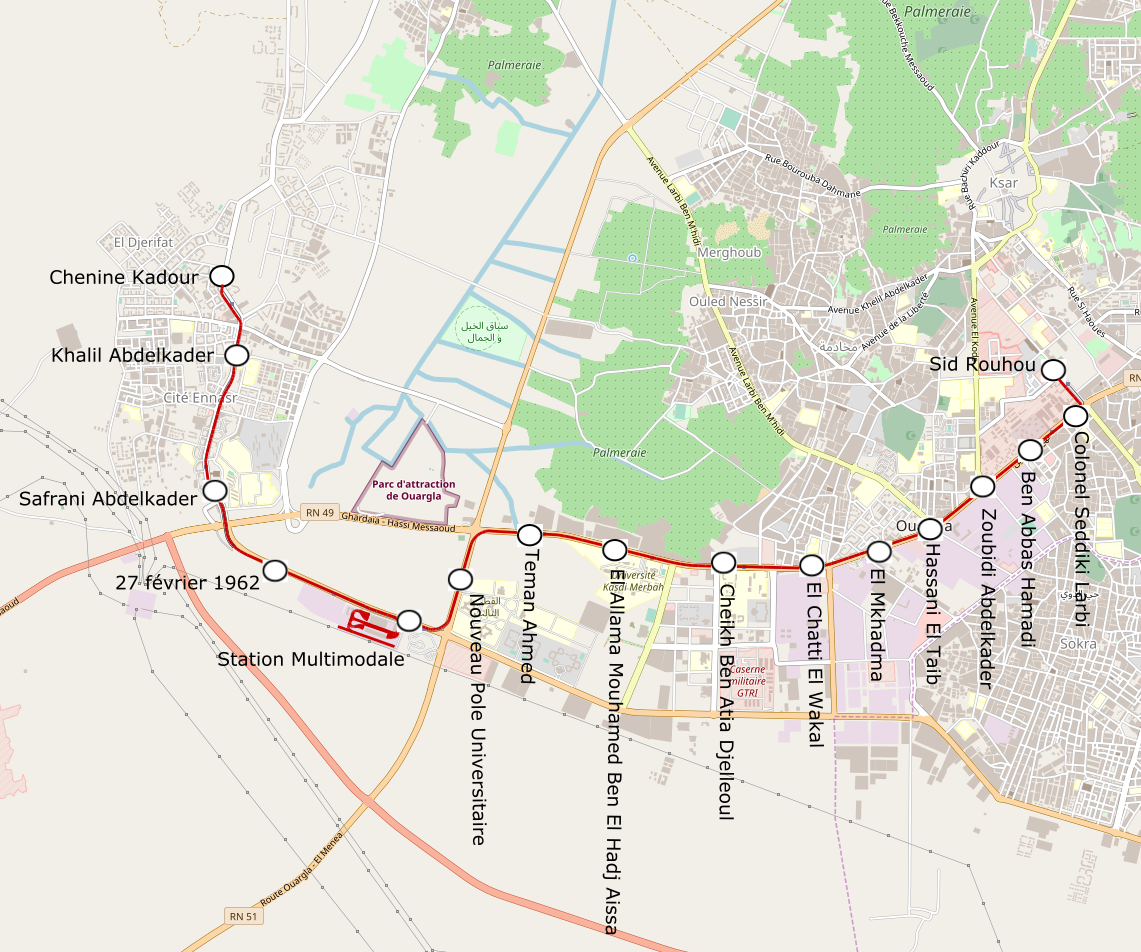

The Ouargla tramway (in Arabic: ترامواي ورقلة) is a tramway network serving the city of Ouargla, Algeria. Opened in 2018, the network is operated by the Société d'exploitation des tramways (SETRAM) and owned by the Entreprise Métro d'Alger (EMA). The network currently consists of one 9.6 km (6.0 mi) long line connecting Ouargla with its western suburbs. As of 2025, three new extensions to the network are planned.

== History ==
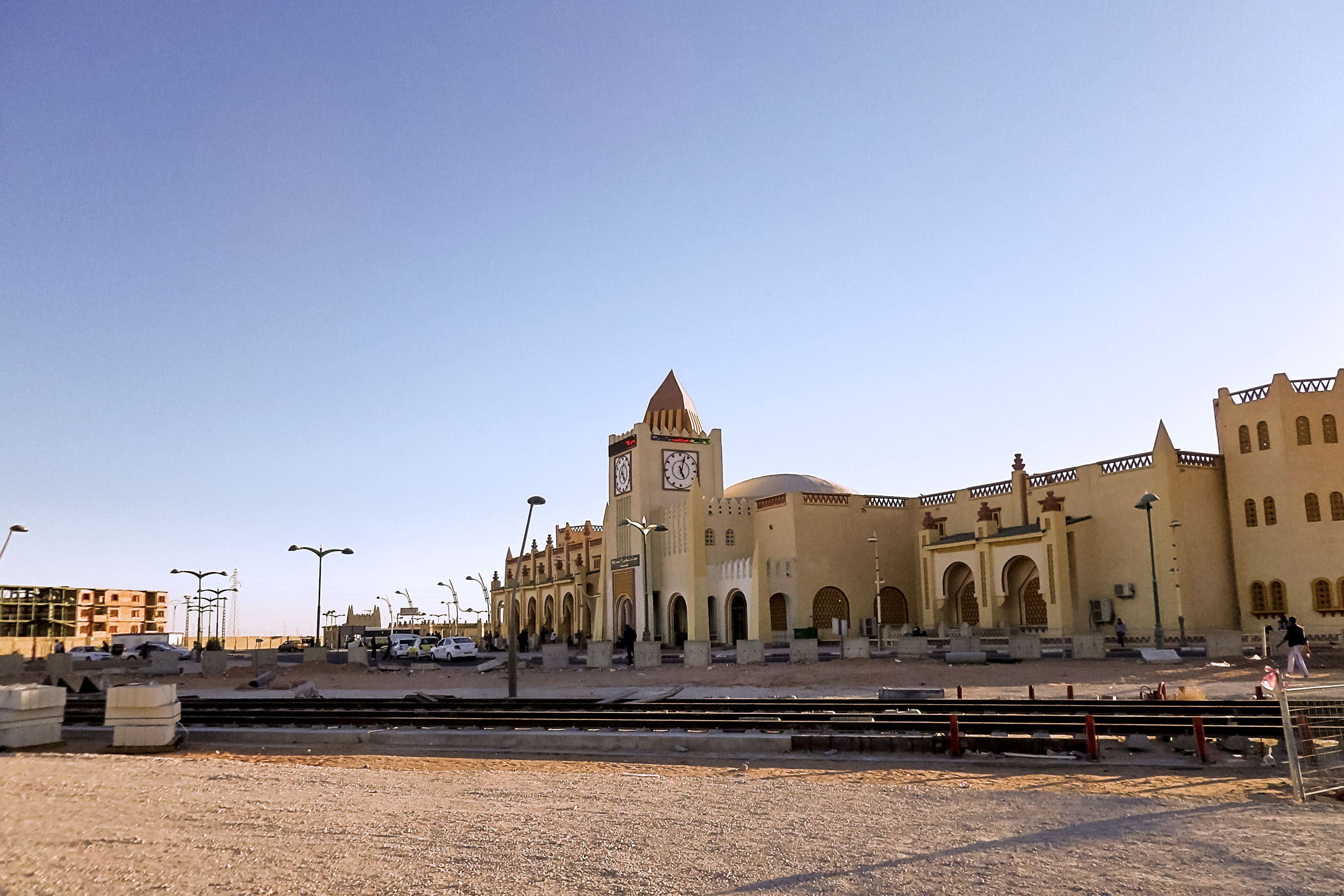
The tramway during construction in January 2016.

The design studies and project management for the Ouargla tramway were awarded to the French company Systra in 2011, with detailed design studies being completed later that year. On 5 November 2012, the déclaration d'utilité publique of the tramway was officially approved.

In June 2013, the EMA (Entreprise Métro d'Alger) awarded the contract for construction of the tramway to a consortium of three Spanish companies: Rover Alcisa, Elecnor, and Assignia. The first stone of the tramway project was laid on August 6, 2013, and full construction of the first phase of the system, from Chenine Kadour to Sid Rouhou over a distance of 9.6 kilometres (6.0 mi), began later in November 2013.

In 2014, 23 Alstom Citadis tram vehicles were ordered to operate on the network, the first of which was delivered on December 20, 2016. Commissioning of the tramway was originally meant to take place by the end of 2017, however this was later delayed to take place in early 2018.

The tramway officially opened for service on March 20, 2018.

== System ==
=== Route and infrastructure ===
The tramway network's only line runs on an east-west alignment over a distance of 9.6 kilometres (6.0 mi) and 16 stops, making it the shortest tram network in Algeria. It runs from the southern edge of Ouargla's city centre at Sid Rouhou east to the new town of Haï Ennasr via the University of Ouargla and the city's intercity bus terminal. The line runs almost entirely at-grade, with a dedicated right-of-way in the median or on the side of main roads. The largest piece of infrastructure on the line is a 40 m (131 ft 3 in) long bridge over the N49 motorway south of Safrani Abdelkader station.

As Ouargla is one of the hottest inhabited places on earth, the tramway has some special features in order to withstand the conditions found in the city. The rails of the tramway are made from R260 type steel, which is designed to be resilient to rough conditions, while the tram depot is also air-conditioned in order to cool off the trams, which are swapped on the hottest days of the year. Additionally, the tracks are cleaned every day of sand blown in from the desert using a specialised vehicle equipped with powerful suction nozzles.

The tram uses standard-gauge (1435 mm) tracks, and electricity is supplied by a 750 V DC overhead wire. The depot and maintenance centre is located near the Gare Multimodale station.

=== Stations ===
The stations are listed from west to east:

	Stations	Commune served
●	Chenine Kadour - شنين قدور	Ouargla
●	Khalil Abdelkader - خليل عبد القادر	Ouargla
●	Safrani Abdelkader - سفراني عبد القادر	Ouargla
●	27 Février 1962 - فيفري 1962 27	Ouargla
●	Gare Multimodale - المحطة متعددة الخدمات	Ouargla
●	Nouveau Pôle Universitaire - القطب الجامعي الجديد	Ouargla
●	Teman Ahmed - تمان أحمد	Ouargla
●	El Allama Mouhamed Ben El Hadj Aissa - العلامة محمد بن حاج عيسى	Ouargla
●	Cheikh Ben Atia Djelloul - الشيخ بن عاطية جلول	Ouargla
●	El Chatti El Wakal - الشطي الواكل	Ouargla
●	El Mkhadma - المخادمة	Ouargla
●	Hassani El Taib - حساني الطيب	Ouargla
●	Zoubidi Abdelkader - زوبيدي عبد القادر	Ouargla
●	Ben Abbas Hamadi - بن عباس حمادي	Ouargla
●	Colonel Seddiki Larbi - الكولونيل صديقي العربي	Ouargla
●	Sid Rouhou - سيد روحو	Ouargla

== Rolling stock ==
The tramway fleet consists of 23 7-section Alstom Citadis 402 vehicles.

Ordered in 2014, the trams were locally assembled as kits by the Cital joint-venture in Annaba. The first tram was delivered on December 20, 2016, and delivery continued until 2018. Like the tram line itself, the vehicles have also been specially adapted in order to withstand the desert conditions. The trams have reinforced air-conditioning, sun-repellent coating, and insulated mechanical components, including the pantograph, shock absorbers, motors, joints, and brakes, in order to keep the most sensitive parts of the vehicles protected from blown sand and high temperatures. The low-floor trams are around 44 m (144 ft 4 in) long, and have a capacity of over 400 passengers.

== Planned lines and extensions ==
As of early 2025, there are three extensions planned for the network:

- Sid Rouhou - Ksar (loop line, 2.8 km (1.7 mi))
- Sid Rouhou - El Hadeb (5 km (3.1 mi))
- Chenine Kadour - Bamendil (4 km (2.5 mi))

The loop line from Sid Rouhou to the Ksar (old town) was included with the initial plans for the tram network, however its construction was not included in the first phase. Switches and tracks for the line south to El Hadeb have already been installed, however all lines remain in the planning phase, with no set date for the start of construction.

== Operation ==
Since its opening, the tramway has been operated by Société d'exploitation des tramways (SETRAM), a joint-venture established in 2012 for the operation of tram networks nationwide.
