= Hassi Ben Abdellah =

Hassi Ben Abdellah ﺣﺎﺳﻲ ﺑﻦ ﻋﺒﺪ اﷲ
- Commune and town

- Location within Algeria
- Coordinates: 32°1′33″N 5°28′7″E
- Country: Algeria
- Province: Ouargla Province
- District: Sidi Khouiled District
- Commune established: 1984

Area
  - Total: 1,672 km^{2} (646 sq mi)
- Elevation: 159 m (522 ft)

Population (2008)
  - Total: 4,950
  - Density: 2.96/km^{2} (7.67/sq mi)
- Time zone: UTC+1 (CET)

Hassi Ben Abdellah (Arabic: ﺣﺎﺳﻲ ﺑﻦ ﻋﺒﺪ اﷲ, Kabyle: Ḥasi Ben Ɛebḍella) is a town and commune in Sidi Khouiled District, Ouargla Province, Algeria, located near the provincial capital, Ouargla. According to the 2008 census it has a population of 4,950, up from 3,693 in 1998, and an annual growth rate of 3.0%. The commune covers an area of 1,672 square kilometres (646 sq mi).

== Geography ==
Hassi Ben Abdellah lies at an elevation of 159 metres (522 ft) above sea level, 20 kilometres (12 mi) from the provincial capital Ouargla, and 8 kilometres (5.0 mi) from the district capital Sidi Khouiled. The land in the area alternates between sand dunes and flat rocky plains dotted with small areas of fertile oases. There is a large palm plantation to the west of Hassi Ben Abdellah that is irrigated with oasis water.

== Economy ==
Most local people are employed in agriculture, including farming of date palms, olives and pomegranates, and the raising of camels and other livestock. Fish farming is also an emerging industry in the region.

== Transportation ==
There are two local roads out of Hassi Ben Abdellah. One connects the town to Sidi Khouiled and Ouargla to the southwest; the other connects to the N56 national highway to the south. From Ouargla, the N49 connects to Ghardaia in the west and Hassi Messaoud in the east. The N56 highway connects to Biskra via the N3.

== Localities ==
The commune is composed of two localities:

- Hassi Benabdellah
- Sahn
