= Tidikelt–Tuat Tamazight language =

Tidikelt–Tuat Tamazight is a Glottolog classification for languages in Algeria that includes:

- Tidikelt language
- Tuwat language
