= El Bour =

- Village
- Location within Algeria
- Coordinates: 32°9′47″N 5°20′43″E
- Country: Algeria
- Province: Ouargla Province
- District: N'Goussa District
- Commune: N'Goussa
- Elevation: 126 m (413 ft)
- Time zone: UTC+1 (CET)

El Bour is a village in the commune of N'Goussa, in N'Goussa District, Ouargla Province, Algeria. The village is located 4 kilometres (2.5 mi) northeast of N'Goussa and 23 kilometres (14 mi) north of the provincial capital Ouargla.
