= Mozabite =

Mozabite may refer to:

- the Mozabite people
- the Mozabite language
