= Haoud El Hamra =

- Village
- Location within Algeria
- Coordinates: 31°53′22″N 5°58′23″E
- Country: Algeria
- Province: Ouargla Province
- District: Hassi Messaoud District
- Commune: Hassi Messaoud
- Elevation: 151 m (495 ft)
- Time zone: UTC+1 (CET)

Haoud El Hamra is a village situated in the commune of Hassi Messaoud, within Hassi Messaoud District, Ouargla Province, Algeria. It is located approximately 24 kilometres (15 mi) north of Hassi Messaoud and 61 kilometres (38 mi) east of the provincial capital, Ouargla.
