= Capture of Touggourt (1871) =

- Part of Mokrani Revolt and French conquest of Algeria
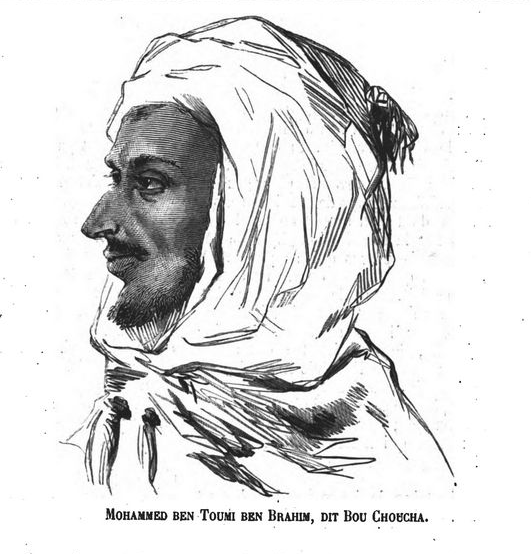
- Cherif Bouchoucha
Date	14 – 15 May 1871
Location	Touggourt, Algeria
Result	Algerian victory

Belligerents
Resistance of Bouchoucha; Resistance of Benchohra: Chaamba tribe	France

Commanders and leaders
Cherif Bouchoucha; Bennacer Benchohra	(France) Lieutenant Mousseli † (France) Sergant Basile †

Strength
Unknown	66 Tirailleurs

Casualties and losses
Unknown	62 Tirailleurs

The Capture of Touggourt was a military operation carried out by the Chaamba tribe against the city of Touggourt during the Mokrani Revolt, in which the French garrison of the city and its commander were massacred. It occurred from May 14–15, 1871.

== Background ==
Bouchoucha was a simple Algerian shepherd who got in trouble with the French for stealing. He managed to escape to Ain Salah, where he joined forces with a tribe called Chaamba, led by Bennacer Benchohra, with them they started a resistance, capturing N’Goussa on 5 March 1871 before attacking Ouargla somewhere in March of the same year. their main enemy was a certain Ali Bey, Agha of Touggourt under the French, who had captured the city in 1854, After Ali recognized their authority. After that, they head to the French controlled Touggourt to Capture it, joined by the Chaamba leader Benchohra.

== Battle ==
The city had 66 French Tirailleurs and two Sergeants, led by the Indigenous Lieutenant Mousseli. Mousseli was known for his military strength but lacked intelligence and didn't make much effort to defend the city, even when he knew Bouchoucha was approaching, When Bouchoucha reached the walls of Touggourt on the morning of May 14, he saw that the doors had been opened by some supporters. Without wasting any time, he took control of the city. Heading to the Casbah, he found a small garrison and even Ali-Bey’s parents there. Bouchoucha's crew attacked the garrison, and during the chaos, the French Sergeant Basile was killed right at the start of the fight. This made Mousseli realize that he had already lost six of his 66 Tirailleurs. Mousseli received an anonymous letter advising him to evacuate the citadel and head north with his army, where Bouchoucha supposedly wouldn't follow. He followed the advice and left on May 15, but they hadn't even gone 5 kilometers from the city when they realized they were surrounded by Cherif’s Touggourtian crew. Mousseli was one of the first to be killed, and the garrison was massacred, with only four Tirailleurs managing to escape. Meanwhile, Ali-Bey’s parents were left completely abandoned by the city garrison in the Casbah. They fought fiercely against Cherif, but when they learned of Mousseli’s death, they surrendered to Bouchoucha. Later, they were handed over to Bouchoucha’s newest Khalifa, Bounchemal ben Goubi.
