= Ouargli language =

Zenati Berber language spoken in Algeria

Ouargli
- Twargrit
- Native to: Algeria
- Region: Ouargla, N'Goussa
- Native speakers: 20,000 (2014)
- Language family: Afro-Asiatic: Berber; Northern; Zenati; Mzab–Wargla; Ouargli

Language codes
- ISO 639-3: oua
- Glottolog: taga1278
- ELP: Ouargli
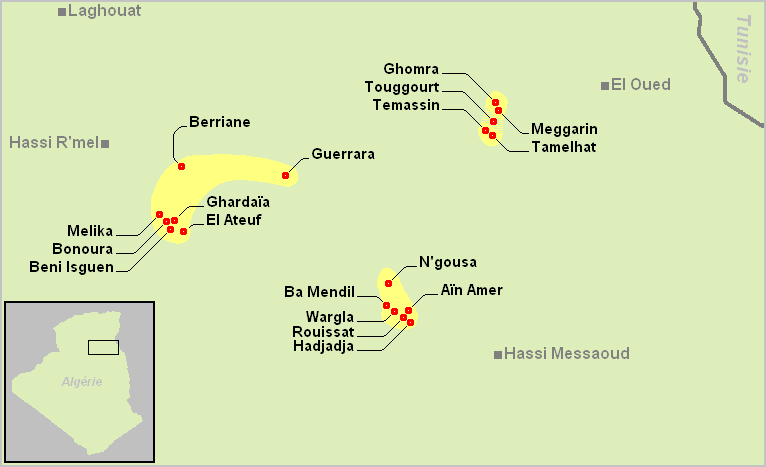
- Berber-speaking areas of the Mzab, Ouargla, and Oued Righ

Ouargli, or Teggargrent (also Twargrit, Təggəngusit), is a Zenati Berber language. It is spoken in the oases of Ouargla (Wargrən) and N'Goussa (Ingusa) in Algeria.

As of 1987, Ouargli had no more than 10,000 speakers. Ethnologue estimated only 5,000 speakers as of 1995.

There are some differences between the dialects of Ouargla (Təggargrənt) and N'Goussa (Təggəngusit), notably in the position of pronominal clitics; within Ouargla, there are minor differences between the three tribes At-Brahim, At-Sisin and At-Waggin.

Speakers from Ouargla regard the varieties of Ouargla, N'Goussa, Tugurt/Temacine and Tumzabt/Mozabite, and possibly other Zenati varieties, as dialects of a single language they call Twargrit. According to Delheure (1987:355), at Wargrən fəhhəmən d awəḥdi tawsint, "the Ouarglis understand Temacine very well."

The principal grammatical study is Biarnay (1908); a less detailed sketch is provided in Basset (1893). Its lexicon is fairly extensively documented in Delheure's (1987) dictionary. The bilingual texts in Biarnay and Basset are more recently supplemented by the texts on daily life in Delheure (1988) and the folk tale collection in Delheure (1989); the latter, unlike other work on Ouargli, includes texts from N'Goussa as well.

== Bibliography ==
- René Basset, Étude sur la zénatia du Mzab, de Ouargla et de l'Oued-Rir', Paris, Leroux, 1893
- Samuel Biarnay, Étude sur le dialecte berbère de Ouargla, Alger, Leroux, 1908
- Jean Delheure, Dictionnaire Ouargli-Français (Index Ricapitulatif Français-Ouargli), Paris, SELAF, 1987 - ISBN 2-85297-197-6
- Jean Delheure, "Id akkaz ini id ahaji. Devinettes et énigmes de Ouargla (Sud Algérien)", Études et Documents Berbères 3 (1987), pp. 76–83 - ISSN 0295-5245
- Jean Delheure, Vivre et mourir à Ouargla / Tameddurt t-tmettant wargren, Paris, SELAF, 1988 - ISBN 2-85297-196-8
- Jean Delheure, "Baghdidis et l'Ogre. Saynète dans le parler de Ouargla", Études et Documents Berbères 4 (1988), pp. 103–115 - ISSN 0295-5245
- Jean Delheure, Contes et légendes berbères de Ouargla, Paris, La Boîte à Documents, 1989 - ISBN 2-906164-05-4
- Jean Delheure, "Izlan d id aghanni. Poésie et chants de Ouargla", Études et Documents Berbères 5 (1989), pp. 85–104 - ISSN 0295-5245
- Alain Romey, histoire, mémoire et sociétés, L'exemple de N'goussa: oasis berbérophone du Sahara (Ouargla), Paris-Alger, L'Harmattan-Awal, 1992 ISBN 2-7384-1579-2
