= N'Goussa District =

- District
- Country: Algeria
- Province: Ouargla Province
- Chief town: N'Goussa
- Time zone: UTC+1 (CET)

The N'Goussa district is an Algerian administrative district in the Ouargla province. Its chief town is located on the eponymous commune of N'Goussa.

== Communes ==
The district is composed of only one commune: N'Goussa.
