= Hassi Messaoud District =

- District
- Country: Algeria
- Province: Ouargla Province
- Chief town: Hassi Messaoud
- Time zone: UTC+1 (CET)

The Hassi Messaoud district is an Algerian administrative district in the Ouargla province. Its chief town is located on the eponymous commune of Hassi Messaoud.

== Communes ==
The district is composed of only one commune: Hassi Messaoud.
