= El Borma =

El Borma اﻟﺒﺮﻣﺔ
- Commune and town
- Location of El Borma commune within Algeria

- Location of El Borma within Algeria
- Coordinates: 31°39′23″N 9°10′45″E
- Country: Algeria
- Province: Ouargla Province
- District: El Borma District

Area
  - Total: 47,261 km^{2} (18,248 sq mi)
- Elevation: 252 m (827 ft)

Population (2008)
  - Total: 3,205
  - Density: 0.06781/km^{2} (0.1756/sq mi)
- Time zone: UTC+1 (CET)

El Borma (Arabic: اﻟﺒﺮﻣﺔ; sometimes spelled Bourma) is a town and commune, which is coextensive with El Borma District, in Algeria. According to the 2008 census it has a population of 3,250, up from 1,997 in 1998 and an annual population growth rate of 4.9%, the second highest in the province. The town is located on the border with Tataouine Governorate, Tunisia.

== Geography ==
El Borma is located amidst the vast sand dunes of the Grand Erg Oriental in eastern Algeria. The location is notable for its underground petroleum reservoirs.

== Climate ==
El Borma has a hot desert climate (Köppen climate classification BWh) with long, extremely hot summers and short, warm winters. The climate is similar to the one of Ouargla. Daytime temperatures are soaring during summer months as they consistently turn around 45 °C (113 °F) between June and September.

Climate data for El Borma (1981–2010, extremes 1969–2017)
Month	Jan	Feb	Mar	Apr	May	Jun	Jul	Aug	Sep	Oct	Nov	Dec	Year
Record high °C (°F)	30.8 (87.4)	35.8 (96.4)	38.7 (101.7)	43.6 (110.5)	45.5 (113.9)	48.5 (119.3)	50.1 (122.2)	48.4 (119.1)	46.0 (114.8)	41.0 (105.8)	37.0 (98.6)	31.0 (87.8)	50.1 (122.2)
Mean daily maximum °C (°F)	16.9 (62.4)	19.7 (67.5)	24.1 (75.4)	28.9 (84.0)	34.0 (93.2)	38.9 (102.0)	40.8 (105.4)	40.5 (104.9)	36.4 (97.5)	30.7 (87.3)	23.2 (73.8)	17.8 (64.0)	29.3 (84.8)
Daily mean °C (°F)	10.3 (50.5)	12.8 (55.0)	16.8 (62.2)	21.6 (70.9)	26.6 (79.9)	30.8 (87.4)	33.0 (91.4)	32.9 (91.2)	29.2 (84.6)	23.7 (74.7)	16.6 (61.9)	11.4 (52.5)	22.1 (71.9)
Mean daily minimum °C (°F)	4.2 (39.6)	5.9 (42.6)	9.7 (49.5)	14.0 (57.2)	18.6 (65.5)	22.7 (72.9)	24.4 (75.9)	24.7 (76.5)	22.1 (71.8)	17.2 (63.0)	10.3 (50.5)	5.6 (42.1)	15.0 (58.9)
Record low °C (°F)	−5.2 (22.6)	−3.1 (26.4)	−0.2 (31.6)	3.6 (38.5)	7.0 (44.6)	12.4 (54.3)	16.0 (60.8)	13.0 (55.4)	12.8 (55.0)	6.5 (43.7)	0.0 (32.0)	−3.0 (26.6)	−5.2 (22.6)
Average precipitation mm (inches)	6.3 (0.25)	4.2 (0.17)	10.3 (0.41)	4.5 (0.18)	5.3 (0.21)	0.7 (0.03)	0.0 (0.0)	0.1 (0.00)	2.2 (0.09)	9.2 (0.36)	3.8 (0.15)	4.9 (0.19)	51.5 (2.04)
Average precipitation days (≥ 1.0 mm)	1.1	0.8	1.5	0.7	0.6	0.2	0.0	0.1	0.6	0.9	0.9	1.1	8.5
Average relative humidity (%)	60	53	49	41	37	34	32	36	44	49	58	63	46
Mean monthly sunshine hours	221.3	225.0	261.4	251.7	297.2	321.6	339.0	349.7	263.8	261.9	228.7	221.3	3,242.6
Source: Institut National de la Météorologie (precipitation days/humidity 1961–1990, sun 1981-2010) (Note: The Station ID for El Borma is 57272512.)

== Economy ==
El Borma's economy is supported by the petroleum industry, due to the oil fields in the area. Grazing is also significant, although limited because of the marginal plant life in the area. Agriculture is currently unfeasible due to the lack of sufficient water supplies.

THe area has become highly polluted and the El Borma lake can be seen from space as having red iron pollution. https://air.plumelabs.com/en/

== Transportation ==
El Borma is an isolated town, with no significant settlements or major roads nearby. A local road leads west to Hassi Messaoud about 300 kilometres (190 mi) to the west, and branches off to the south, reaching Ghadames in Libya and Debdeb in Illizi Province about 180 kilometres (110 mi) to the south.

The town is served by El Borma Airport.

== Education ==
1.6% of the population has a tertiary education (the lowest in the province), and another 3.5% has completed secondary education. The overall literacy rate is 42.6%, and is 54.7% among males and 28.5% among females. All three rates are the lowest in the province.

== Localities ==
The commune is composed of eight localities:

- El Borma
- Rhoud El Baguel
- El Masder
- Bordj Saïf Fatima
- Bordj Bir El Djedid
- Bordj Bir Larache
- Keskassa
- Erg Yagoub
