= Rhourde Nouss gas field =

Gas field in Ouargla Province, Algeria

Rhourde Nouss
- Country: Algeria
- Region: Ouargla Province
- Offshore/onshore: onshore
- Operator: Sonatrach

Field history
- Discovery: 1980
- Start of production: 1980

Production
- Estimated gas in place: 370×10^{9} m^{3} 13×10^{12} cu ft

The Rhourde Nouss gas field is a natural gas field located in the Ouargla Province. It was discovered in 1980 and developed by Sonatrach. It began production in 1956 and produces natural gas and condensates. The total proven reserves of the Rhourde Nouss gas field are around 13 trillion cubic feet (370 billion m³), and production is slated to be around 1.69 billion cubic feet/day (48.3×10^{5}m³).
