= Sud Oranais–Gourara language =

Sud Oranais – Gourara is a Glottolog classification that includes:

- Gurara language, spoken in Algeria
- South Oran and Figuig Berber, spoken in Algeria and Morocco
