= Mzab–Wargla languages =

Dialect cluster in North Africa

Mzab–Wargla
- Geographic distribution: North Africa
- Linguistic classification: Afro-Asiatic: Berber; Northern Berber; Zenati; Mzab–Wargla

Language codes
- Glottolog: moza1250
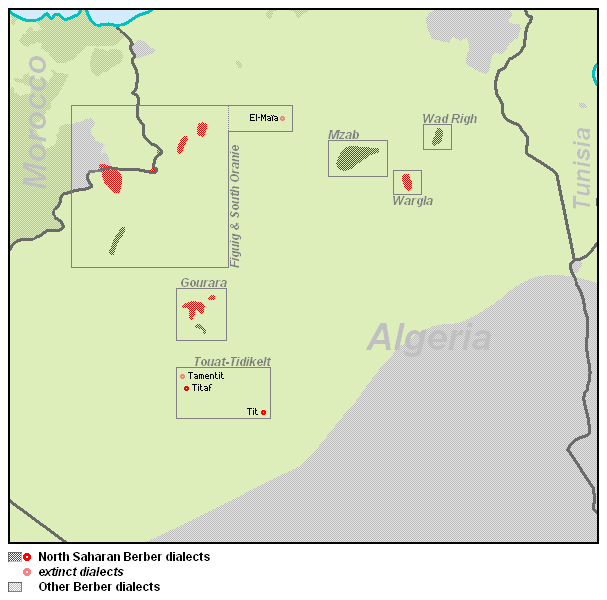
- Kossmann's "Northern Saharan oasis" dialects

The Mzab–Wargla languages or Northern Saharan oasis dialects are a dialect cluster of the Zenati languages, within the Northern Berber subbranch. They are spoken in scattered oases of Algeria and Morocco.

== Subclassification ==
Kossmann (2013)

Maarten Kossmann (2013) listed six "Northern Saharan oasis" dialects:

- South Oranie and Figuig
- Gurara
- Tuwat-Tidikelt
- Mzab
- Wargla
- Wad Righ (Tugurt)

Ethnologue (2009)

In Ethnologue XVI (2009), the "Mzab–Wargla" languages are listed as:

- Tagargrent (Wargli)
- Temacine Tamazight (Tugurt)
- Taznatit ("Zenati": Gurara, Tuwat and South Oran)
- Tumzabt (Mozabite)

Unlike Kossmann, Ethnologue considers the Berber dialect spoken in Tidikelt as a separate branch of the Zenati group, distinct from Tuwat.

== Linguistic maps ==
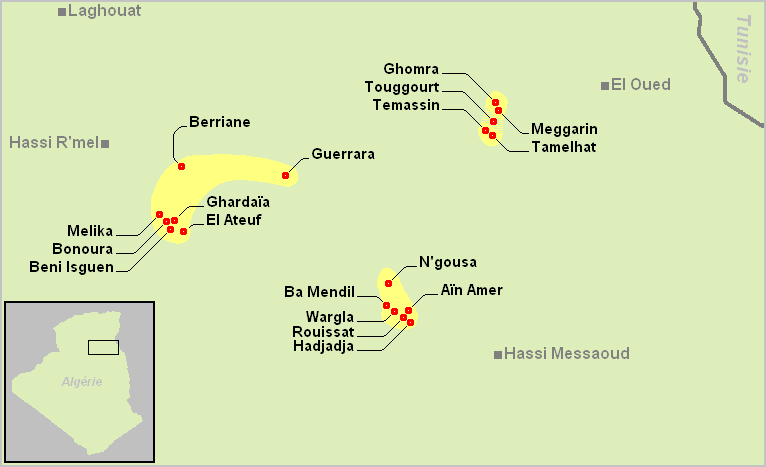
Mzab, Wargla and Wad Righ

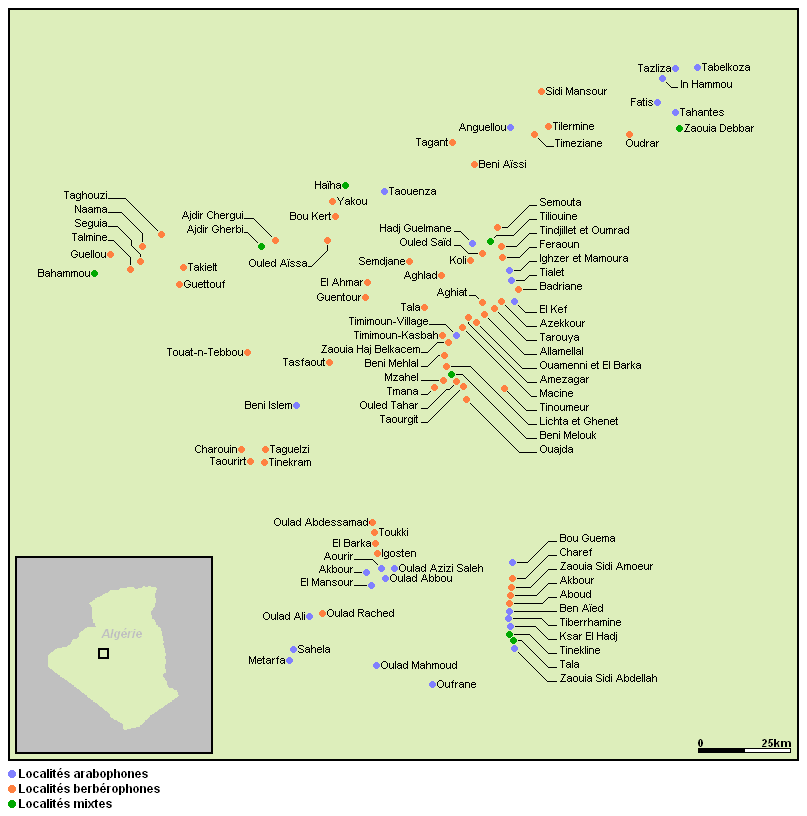
Gourara

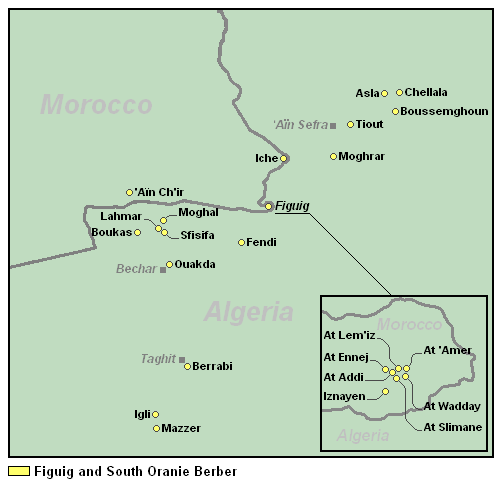
South Oranie and Figuig
