= Hassi Messaoud mob attacks against women =

Hassi Messaoud controversy (mob attacks against women) (French: L'affaire des femmes violées de Hassi Messaoud) refers to many especially violent attacks against women living in the city of Hassi Messaoud in Algeria in July 2001 and the continuing court cases associated with it. The controversy has received much coverage in the French-language press, including in Algeria and in France, which has a significant Algerian immigrant community.

== Context ==
The city of Hassi Messaoud is a petroleum industry hub in the centre of Algeria. It has approximately 53,000 inhabitants. Various petroleum businesses operate there, and the city has become a place to seek employment and economic security for many Algerians, which was in the midst of a civil war. This has led to the development of many bidonvilles (shantytowns) around the city.

Many women have migrated to Hassi Messaoud to find employment doing maintenance tasks, secretarial work or in catering in the petroleum companies. Such women work, but also live alone, in a very traditional region. Islamic preachers have accused them of having a "second job", i.e., working as prostitutes by night in addition to their day jobs, in a region with a high unemployment rate among men. Before the mob violence, many women had been the subject of insults, and some had been physically threatened.

== First incident ==
During the day of prayer on Friday, July 13, 2001, an imam described as fundamentalist, Amar Taleb, verbally attacked the women coming from the regions of the northwest to work in the petroleum companies, inciting the men in attendance to commit violent acts against them. He accused them of "immoral" behaviour, calling for a "Jihad against the devil" in order to "hunt down fornicating women". According to him, women living alone, without a wali, (a male guardian according to the Maliki tradition), could only be prostitutes.

During the night of 13 to 14 July, around 10 PM, a mob of around 300 men moved in the direction of the bidonville El-Haïcha, where women working as housecleaners, cooks and secretaries lived. Over the course of five hours, 40 women in the area were attacked, beaten, raped, mutilated, and dragged through the street naked. Their homes were looted and some were burnt. Some of the attackers were armed with knives. The police did not arrive until 3 AM, putting an end to the violence.

This was repeated the following night, and then on July 16 it was repeated in other neighborhoods of the city. On July 17, then on July 23 and 24, the violence spread to the city of Tebessa, then further south where businesses owned by lone women were vandalized.

Dozens of women were hospitalized, six in critical condition. There were 95 women and children who found refuge in a youth hostel. Others hired taxis to leave the city and return to their region of origin. The newspaper La Tribune wrote of four to six deaths, which authorities denied. Witnesses described seeing several dead women. In August 2001, the association SOS Femmes en détresse spoke of woman killed by an attack, and three who remained hospitalized

== The trials ==
According to newspaper La Tribune, imam Amar Taleb was arrested, as well as 40 men who took part in the violence. Le Matin confirmed 9 arrests. Amar Taleb, however, continues to preach in the largest mosque in the city.

Thirty-nine women decided to file charges. In the first instance, in June 2004, none of the victims were able to have recourse to a lawyer, not even those who were promised by the Ministry of Solidarity. Most of the charges against the 32 attackers were deemed waived, retaining only "the mob in the street and public order offenses". The appeal process began in December 2004, but was postponed to 2005, at the court of Biskra, to allow all of those accused to be present in court. At the reopening of the trial, only six of the accused were present, facing three victims. Under pressure and threats (including even within the courtroom during the first trial) the other women abandoned their lawsuits. Prison sentences of eight, six and three years were delivered to the three accused who were present, and the three others were acquitted. Most of the attackers were sentenced in absentia: 20 were sentenced to 20 years, 4 were sentenced to 10 years and one was sentenced to five years. However, only three had to serve their sentences.

=== Continuing attacks ===
As of 2011, similar mob attacks against women continued in Hassi Messaoud and elsewhere in Algeria, notably M'sila. The Wasilla network created an observatory for monitoring the incidents and in September 2016 published a report within three days of new incidents taking place.

=== Films and publications ===
The incident was the subject of a dramatic film, released in 2008: Vivantes ! by Saïd Ould Khelifa, filmed by Belgian cinematographer Marc Koninckx.

In February 2010, two of the victims, Rahmouna Salah and Fatiha Maamoura, published a book, Laissées pour mortes, Le lynchage des femmes de Hassi Messaoud, through Éditions Max Milo. An Algerian actress Nadia Kaci collected their accounts of the events.
