= El Borma Airport =

Airport in Tunisia

- IATA: EBM; ICAO: DTTR

Summary
- Airport type: Public
- Serves: El Borma
- Elevation AMSL: 847 ft / 258 m
- Coordinates: 31°42′15″N 9°15′15″E

Map
- Location of the airport in Tunisia

Runways
Direction	Length		Surface
Direction	ft	m	Surface
11/29	8,860	2,700	Asphalt
- Source: Google Maps

El Borma (IATA: EBM, ICAO: DTTR) is an airport serving the El Borma town and its oil fields in Tunisia.

== See also ==
- Transport in Tunisia
