= Ourida Chouaki =

Algerian feminist

- Born: 1953 or 1954
- Died: 12 August 2015 (aged 61); Algiers, Algeria
- Known for: Women's rights activism

Ourida Chouaki (1953 or 1954 – 12 August 2015) was an Algerian women's rights activist. Founder of an association campaigning for reform to the Algerian Family Code she coordinated the 20 ans, barakat! which successfully brought about the replacement of the law in 2004. She also worked for the Marche mondiale des Femmes.

== Life ==
Chouaki was the sister of education activist and Democratic and Social Movement member Salah Chouaki who was killed by militants from the Armed Islamic Group of Algeria in the 1990s. She said later that it was important to honour the memory of those who lost their lives to Islamist forces by combating extremist ideology and discrediting jihad.

Chouaki was a lecturer in physics at the University of Sciences and Technology Houari Boumediene in Bab Ezzouar. She was a keen proponent of women's rights and was head of the Tarwa n'Fadhma n'Soumer association, campaigning for family code reform and equality. The organisation was named after Lalla Fatma N'Soumer, a 19th-century Algerian feminist. Chouaki co-ordinated the 2003 20 ans, barakat! (20 years is enough!) campaign to reform the 1984 Algerian Family Code. The campaign sought to ensure that child and other maintenance support payments were required after a divorce, to outlaw polygamy, to provide equal rights to each party over custody of their children, to outlaw matrimonial guardians and to provide equal rights to a divorce for men and women. Chouaki organised public lectures, conferences, poster campaigns and made use of the internet to promote her cause.

The movement was successful in getting the Algerian parliament to implement a revised family code in 2004. However Chouaki was critical of the new law which she said contained too many ambiguities and retained the use of matrimonial guardians. She was concerned that men would force women to accept a matrimonial guardian and saw it as a concession to the Islamic Movement of Society for Peace who had opposed the new law. Chouaki was also concerned that too much power rested with judges, particularly in divorce cases. Such was her influence that she has been described as a participant in all of the struggles for democracy and women's rights in Algeria.

Chouaki was a member of the International Africa Secretariat of the Marche mondiale des Femmes and of the supervising committee of the Forum Social Maghrébin. She died at the Beni Messous Hospital in Algiers on 14 August 2015 at the age of 61 after suffering from a swift-acting disease. The day prior to her death she had been making preparations for a women's march against poverty and inequality to be held in Marseille, France. The Tarwa n'Fadhma n'Soumer would have sent a delegation to the march.
