= Rouissat =

Rouissat اﻟﺮوﻳﺴﺎت
- Town

- Location within Algeria
- Coordinates: 31°55′N 5°21′E
- Country: Algeria
- Province: Ouargla Province
- District: Ouargla District
- Elevation: 138 m (453 ft)

Population (2008)
  - Total: 58,112
- Time zone: UTC+1 (CET)

Rouissat is a town and commune in Ouargla District, Ouargla Province, Algeria. According to the 2008 census it has a population of 58,112, up from 37,814 in 1998, and a population growth rate of 4.5%. It is within the urban area of the provincial capital Ouargla, lying just to the south of the city center.

== Localities ==
The commune is composed of eight localities:

- Rouissat
- El Hadeb
- Babanou
- Sidi Naïmi
- Ziaïna
- Sidi mbarek
- Sokra
- lachoual
