= Mozabite people =

Berber ethnic group In North Africa

Mozabites
At Weɣlan At Mzab
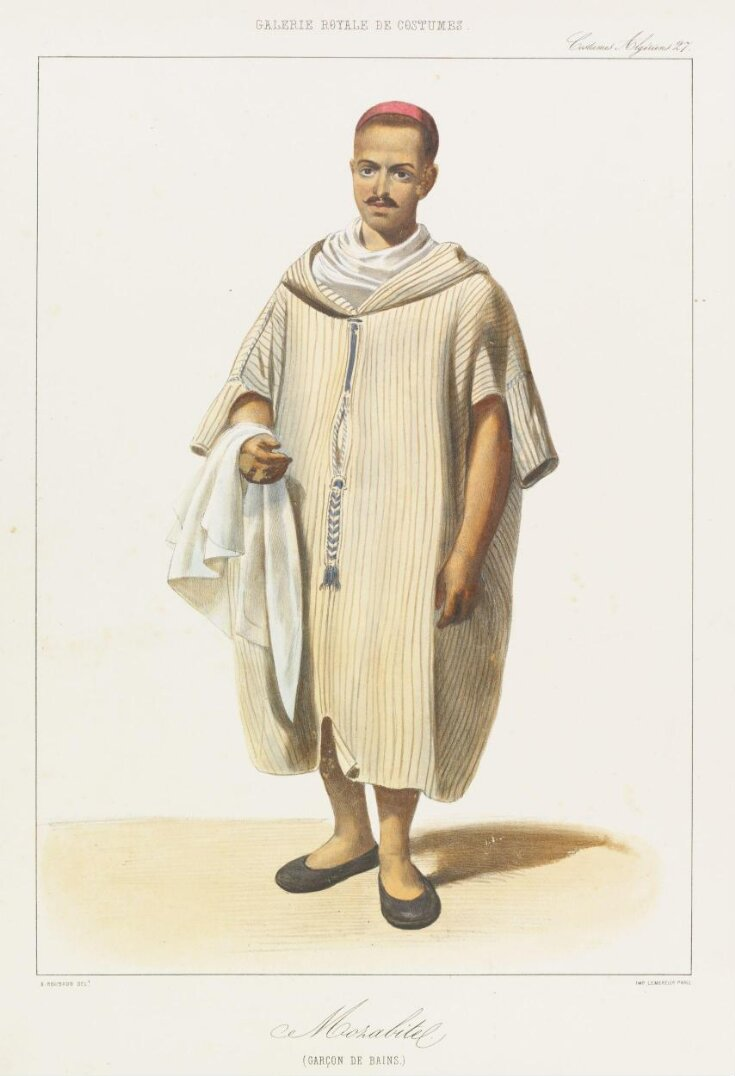
- Mozabite in 1842

Total population
- 150,000–300,000 (2015)

Regions with significant populations
- M'zab valley, Algeria

Languages
- Mozabite

Religion
- Ibadi Islam and Judaism

Related ethnic groups
- Beni Snassen, Chaoui people, Tuareg people, Kabyle people, Riffians, other Berbers

The Mozabite people (Tumzabt: At Weɣlan or At Mzab; Arabic: بني مزاب, romanized: Banī Mzāb) are a Berber ethnic group inhabiting the M'zab natural region in the northern Sahara of Algeria, numbering about 150,000 to 300,000 people. They primarily speak the Mozabite language, one of the Zenati languages in the Berber branch of the Afroasiatic family. Mozabites are primarily Ibadi Muslims, but there was a small population of Mzabi Jews as well.

A Mozabite man in 1889 or 1890

Mozabites mainly live in five oases; namely, Ghardaïa, Beni Isguen, El Atteuf, Melika and Bounoura, as well as two other isolated oases farther north: Berriane and El Guerrara. Ghardaïa is the capital of the confederation, followed in importance by Beni Isguen, the chief commercial centre.

== Etymology ==
According to Ibn Khaldun, the name Mzab comes from Maṣʿab referring to the supposed ancestor Maṣʿab ibn Sadmān, hence Banī Maṣʿāb. Others claimed that the word Mzab is a corruption of “Muṣʿab”, “Muṣʿāb” or “Muḍāb". Ibadi author Amhammad Atfayyash claims that it derives from the Meccan Arabic word mīzāb (ميزاب) meaning "gutter" calling them Bani Mizab ("sons of Mizab"). This could have been to establish a sacred link as Mizab refers to the gutter of the sanctuary of the main mosque of Mecca or to establish a Meccan origin for the Ibadis. Mozabite anthropologist Brahim Chérifi argues that it comes from the Berber phrase At n-Zab meaning the "people of Zab".

== History ==
In 767, a refugee Persian Ibadi leader founded the Rustamid dynasty in the region, leading to most of the Berber population adopting Ibadi Islam. After being defeated at Tiaret by the Fatimid Caliphate in 911, they were banished to Ouargla in the Sahara and founded an independent state in the M'zab in 1012. In 1012, further persecutions made them flee to their present location, where they long remained invulnerable.

In the 1500s, they recognized nominal Ottoman authority. After the capture of Laghouat by the French in 1852, the Mozabites concluded a convention in 1853. They agreed to pay an annual contribution of 1800 francs in return for their independence. In November 1882, the M'zab country was annexed by French Algeria.

Since the establishment of French control, Beni Isguen has become the depot for the sale of goods from Europe. The Mozabite engineers built a system of irrigation works that made the oases much more fertile than before.

== Language ==
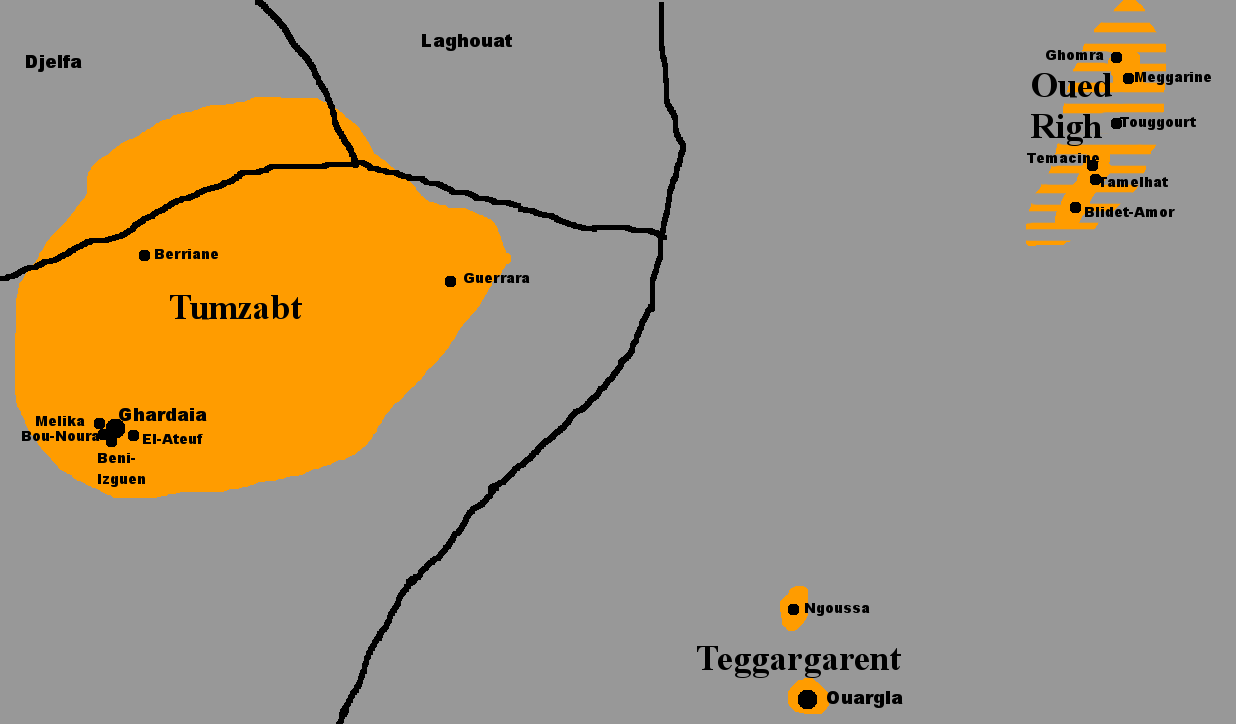
Berber-speaking areas of the M'zab, Ouargla, and Oued Righ

Mozabites speak the Mozabite language, a branch of the Zenati group of Berber languages. Many also speak Algerian Arabic as a second language. The Mozabite language is spoken by around 150,000 people.

== Mozabite Jews ==
It is not canonically agreed when Jews first came to Southern Algeria, but one theory suggests they were sent there by the Ibadite leadership in the 14th century from Tunisia, as part of a merchant trade route. They continued as a merchant community, with subsequent waves of immigration during times of anti-Semitism across the Sahara, Europe, and the Middle East. In 1881, one year before the French annexed the M'zab, there were an estimated 3,000 Mozabite Jews out of the 30,000 Algerian Jews. By 1921, the latter number would grow to 74,000, but the Mozabite Jewish community would remain small, with most Jewish migrants settling in the north.

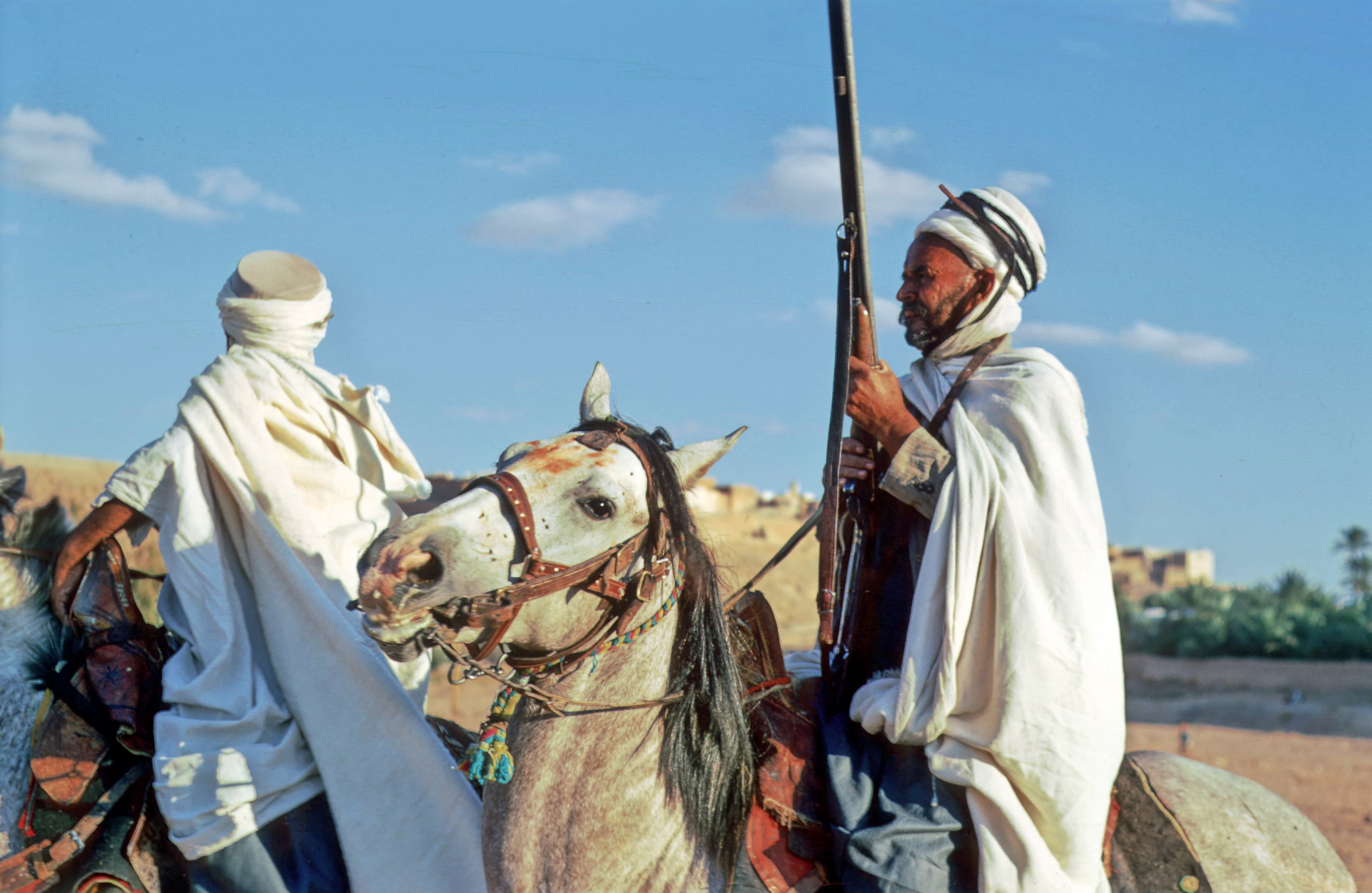
Mozabite horsemen in Ghardaia.

In 1882, when the French military annexed the M'zab, it began an administrative rule that was separate from the northern departments. Unlike their northern Jewish counterparts, many of the Mozabite Berber Jews in Southern Algeria were classified by the French under the “indigenous code”. Given the diversity of the M'zab Jewish population, the French administration incorporated some “culturally Saharan” but ethnically non-indigenous Jews to the north and gave them citizenship under the Crémieux Decree of 1870. That perceived distinction by the French between Berber and non-Berber Jews of the Mzab was not a reflection of “technical precision” but rather “a manufactured form of legal difference”. While the French sought to assimilate the Northern Jewry as French citizens, they recognised religious rule of the Mozabite Jewish population and kept them separate under indigenous law, which meant severely limiting its political and social power.

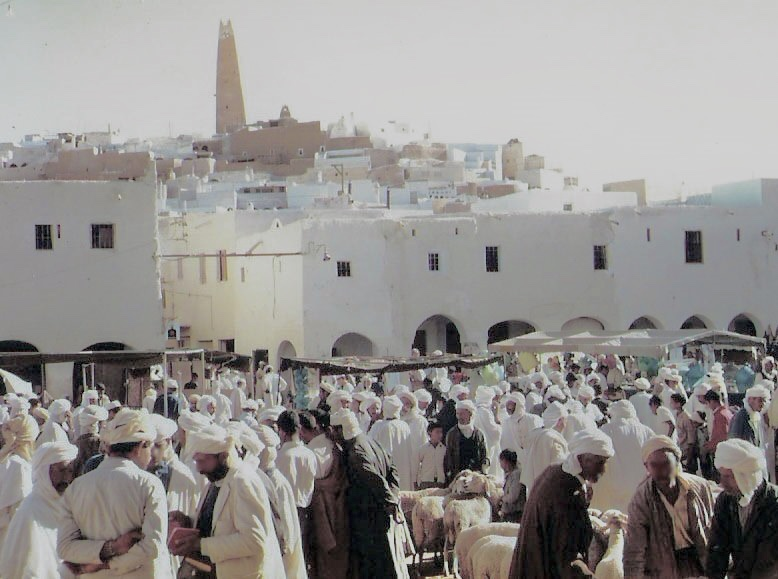
Market on the main square, Ghardaia, Algeria, 2006.

With anti-Semitism on the rise in the late 1800s, the French colonial powers sought to decrease Jewish commerce in the south and prevent further Jewish collaboration with Muslim communities. They continued to distance the Mozabite Jews from other Algerian Jewish affairs by keeping Mozabite, or “Mosaic” laws for civil matters, and French indigenous laws for public and criminal matters. It was not until 1961, with the French National Assembly Law 61-805, that the Mozabite Jews were granted “common law civil status” and French citizenship.

== Genetics ==
Mozabite people are characterized by a very high level of North African haplogroups E1b1b1b (M81) (86%) and U6 (28%).

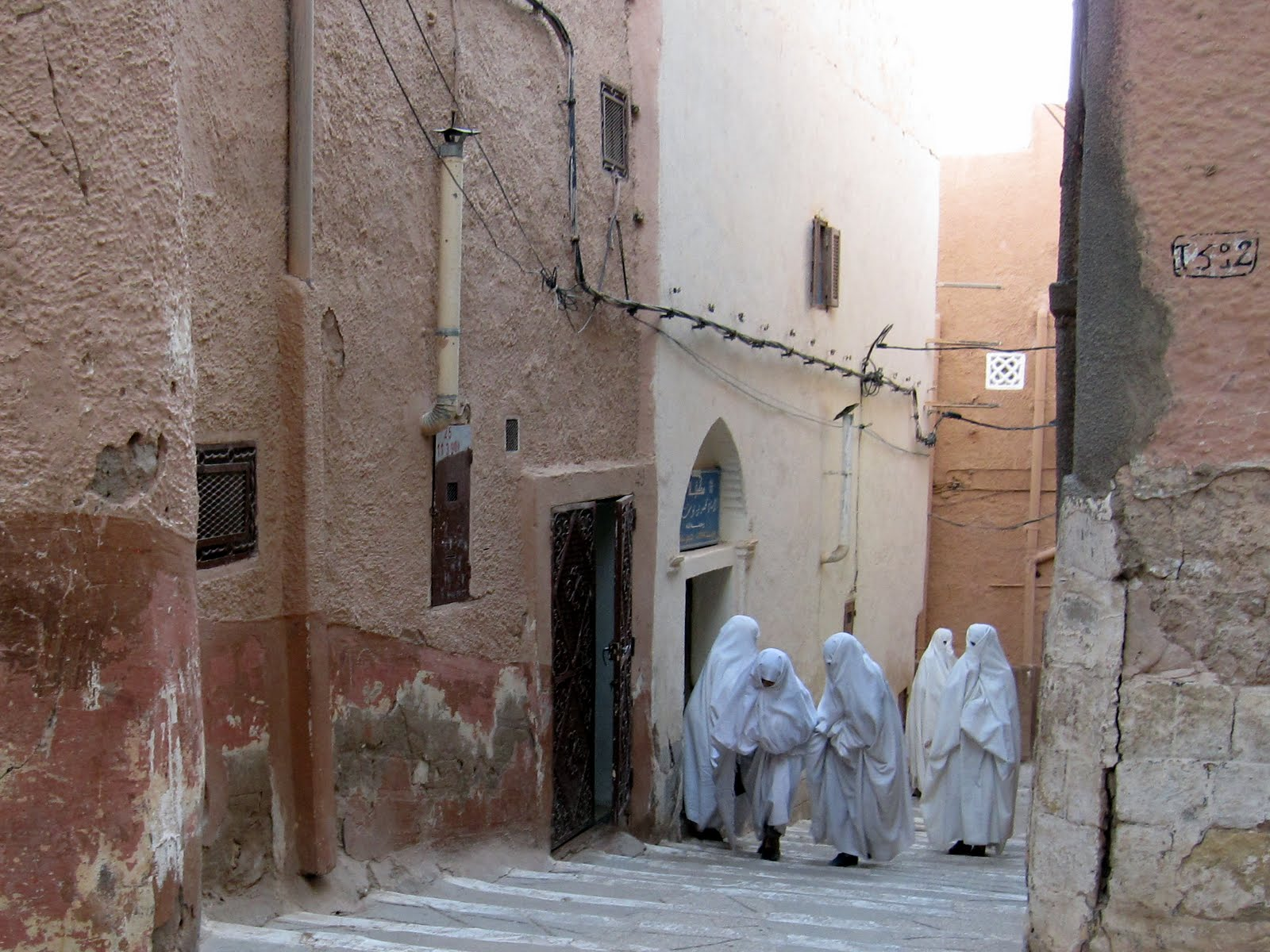
Women in Ghardaia, Algeria

=== Y-DNA ===
Y-Dna	Nb	A/B	E(xE1b1b)	E1b1b1 (M35)	E1b1b1a (M78)	E1b1b1b (M81)	E1b1b1c (M123)	F	K	G	I	J1	J2	R1a	R1b	Other	Study
Y-chromosome DNA haplogroup	67	0	4.5%	0	1.5%	86.6%	1.5%	0	0	1.5%	0	1.5%	0	0	3%	0	Dugoujon et al. (2009)

=== mtDNA ===
mtDna	Nb	Eurasian lineages	Africa-centered lineages (L)	North African lineages (U6, M1)	Study
Human mitochondrial DNA haplogroup	85	54.1%	12.9%	33.0%	Coudray et al. (2009)

== See also ==
- Mzab (Moroccan tribe)
