= University of Ouargla =

University in Algeria

Université Kasdi Merbah Ouargla
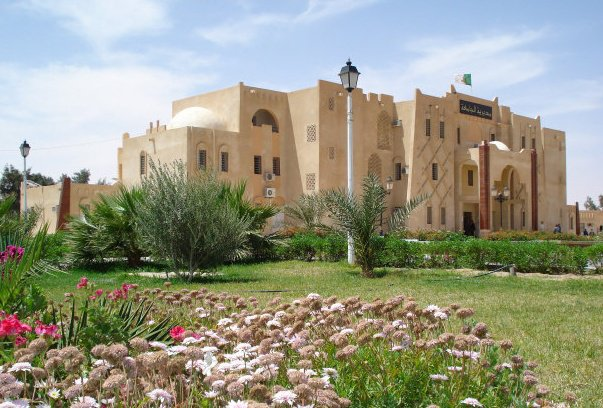
- Université Kasdi Merbah Ouargla Rectorat
- Former names: Université de Ouargla
- Established: 1988
- Students: 25421
- Undergraduates: 18767
- Postgraduates: 3590
- Doctoral students: 709
- Location: Ouargla, Ouargla Province, Algeria; 31°56′34″N 5°17′55″E
- Website: www.univ-ouargla.dz

The Université de Ouargla (officially Université Kasdi Merbah Ouargla) is a university located in Ouargla, Algeria. It was founded on March 22, 1988. The university covers 88 hectares (220 acres), has six libraries and 26 research laboratories.

== Enrollment ==
For the academic year 2012–2013, there were 18,767 undergraduate students, 3,590 Masters students and 709 PhD students enrolled in the university.

== See also ==
- List of universities in Algeria
