= Aïn Beida, Ouargla =

Ain Beida ﻋﻴﻦ اﻟﺒﻴﻀﺎء
- Commune and town
- Location of Ain Beida commune within Ouargla Province

- Location of Ain Beida within Algeria
- Coordinates: 31°56′18″N 5°24′1″E
- Country: Algeria
- Province: Ouargla Province
- District: Sidi Khouïled District

Area
  - Total: 1,973 km^{2} (762 sq mi)
- Elevation: 139 m (456 ft)

Population (2008)
  - Total: 19,039
  - Density: 9.650/km^{2} (24.99/sq mi)
- Time zone: UTC+1 (CET)

Ain Beida (Arabic: ﻋﻴﻦ اﻟﺒﻴﻀﺎء, lit. white eye) is a town and commune in Sidi Khouïled District, Ouargla Province, Algeria. According to the 2008 census it has a population of 19,039, up from 14,500 in 1998, and an annual population growth rate of 2.8%. Ain Beida is just 6 kilometres (3.7 mi) from central Ouargla and is effectively a suburb of the city. It is also home to the Ain Beida Airport, Ouargla's principal airport.

== Climate ==
Ain Beida has a hot desert climate (Köppen climate classification BWh), with very hot summers and mild winters. Rainfall is light and sporadic, and summers are particularly dry.

== Education ==
5.4% of the population has a tertiary education, and another 16.2% has completed secondary education. The overall literacy rate is 82.5%, and is 91.1% among males and 73.5% among females.

== Localities ==
The commune is composed of four localities:

- Aïn Beida
- Chott
- Adjadja
- Aïn Guedima
