= Ouargla District =

Ouargla District دائرة وَرڨلة
- District
- Map of Algeria highlighting Ouargla Province

- Map of Ouargla Province highlighting Ouargla District

- Location within Algeria
- Coordinates: 31°57′12″N 5°19′58″E
- Country: Algeria
- Province: Ouargla
- District seat: Ouargla

Area
  - Total: 67,000 km^{2} (26,000 sq mi)

Population (2024)
  - Total: 700,000
  - Density: 10/km^{2} (27/sq mi)
- Time zone: UTC+01 (CET)
- Communes: 2

Ouargla District is a district in Ouargla Province, Algeria. It was named after its capital, Ouargla, which is also the capital of the province. According to the 2024 census, the total population of the district was 700,000 inhabitants.

== Communes ==
The district is further divided into two communes:

- Ouargla
- Rouissat

Both communes form part of Ouargla's urban area.
