= Sidi Khouïled District =

Coordinates: 31°58′47″N 5°25′06″E

Sidi Khouïled District دائرة سيدي خويلد
- District
- Map of Algeria highlighting Ouargla Province

- Map of Ouargla Province highlighting Sidi Khouïled District
- Country: Algeria
- Province: Ouargla
- District seat: Sidi Khouïled

Area
  - Total: 5,164 km^{2} (1,994 sq mi)

Population (2008)
  - Total: 32,792
  - Density: 6.350/km^{2} (16.45/sq mi)
- Time zone: UTC+01 (CET)
- Communes: 3

Sidi Khouïled is a district in Ouargla Province, Algeria. It was named after its capital, Sidi Khouïled. As of the 2008 census, the district had a total population of 32,792. Most of the population of this district lives just to the west of the provincial capital, Ouargla.

== Communes ==
The district is further divided into 3 communes:

- Sidi Khouïled
- Aïn Beida
- Hassi Ben Abdellah
