= Tuwat language =

Zenati Berber language spoken in Algeria

Tuwat
- Touat
- Native to: Algeria
- Region: Tuat
- Native speakers: (undated figure of "dying out")
- Language family: Afro-Asiatic: Berber; Northern; Zenati; Mzab-Wargla; Tuwat

Language codes
- ISO 639-3: grr (included)
- Glottolog: toua1238

Tuwat (Touat, Tuat) is a Zenati Berber language. It is spoken by Zenata Berbers in a number of villages in the Tuat region of southern Algeria; notably Tamentit (where it was already practically extinct by 1985) and Tittaf, located south of the Gurara Berber speech area. Ethnologue considers them a single language, "Zenati", but Blench (2006) classifies Gurara as a dialect of Mzab–Wargla and Tuwat as a dialect of the Riff cluster.
