= Tidikelt language =

Zenati Berber language of Algeria

Tidikelt Tamazight
- Tit
- Native to: Algeria, Morocco, Tunisia, Western Sahara
- Region: Tidikelt, Salah Area, Tit South
- Ethnicity: Berbers
- Native speakers: 1,000 (2011)
- Language family: Afro-Asiatic: Berber; Northern; Zenati; Mzab–Wargla; Tidikelt Tamazight

Language codes
- ISO 639-3: tia
- Glottolog: tidi1241
- ELP: Tidikelt Tamazight

Tidikelt (also known as Tidikelt Tamazight, Tamazight or Tidikelt Berber) is a Zenati Berber language spoken in Algeria. It is one of the Mzab–Wargla languages. Tidikelt is spoken in the northwest of Tamanrasset Province, including in In Salah District. Tidikelt Tamazight has two dialects; Tidikelt and Tit. Tidikelt Tamazight is considered to be an endangered language, nearly extinct, with only 1,000 speakers of the language and decreasing.

== Classification ==
Tidikelt Tamazight is part of the Berber branch of the Afroasiatic family.

== History ==
The northern region of Africa was, at one point in history, was primarily inhabited by Berbers. The name Berber comes from Barbari, which was used by the Romans. Barbari is a Latin word meaning Barbarians. Their tribes could be found across the northern region. However, when the Muslims invaded and took over the northern region of Africa, they spread the Arabic language, which eventually led to the diminished use of Tidikelt Tamazight. As the Arabic language spread, so did the religion of Islam. Considering that the Arabic language and Islam were very closely related, and many of the Berbers were converting to Islam, Tidikelt Tamazight began to fade.

== Geographic distribution ==
There are about 1,000 speakers of Tidikelt Tamazight. Most of these speakers can be found in the northwest of Tamanrasset Province, Algeria. There are Tidikelt Tamazight speakers also found in Western Sahara, Morocco and Tunisia.

=== Status ===
Tidikelt Tamazight is moribund, nearly extinct. The current population of speakers consist entirely of elderly speakers who have mostly shifted to using the Algerian Arabic language. External intervention is likely required to preserve the language.
