= Gurara language =

Berber language of Algeria

Gurara
- تازناتيت (Taznatit) / ⵜⴰⵣⵏⴰⵜⵉⵜ
- Native to: Algeria, Morocco
- Region: Gourara (wilaya of Adrar)
- Native speakers: 26,000, including Tuwat (2014–2022)
- Language family: Afro-Asiatic: Berber; Northern; Zenati; Mzab-Wargla; Gurara

Language codes
- ISO 639-3: grr (included)
- Glottolog: gour1247
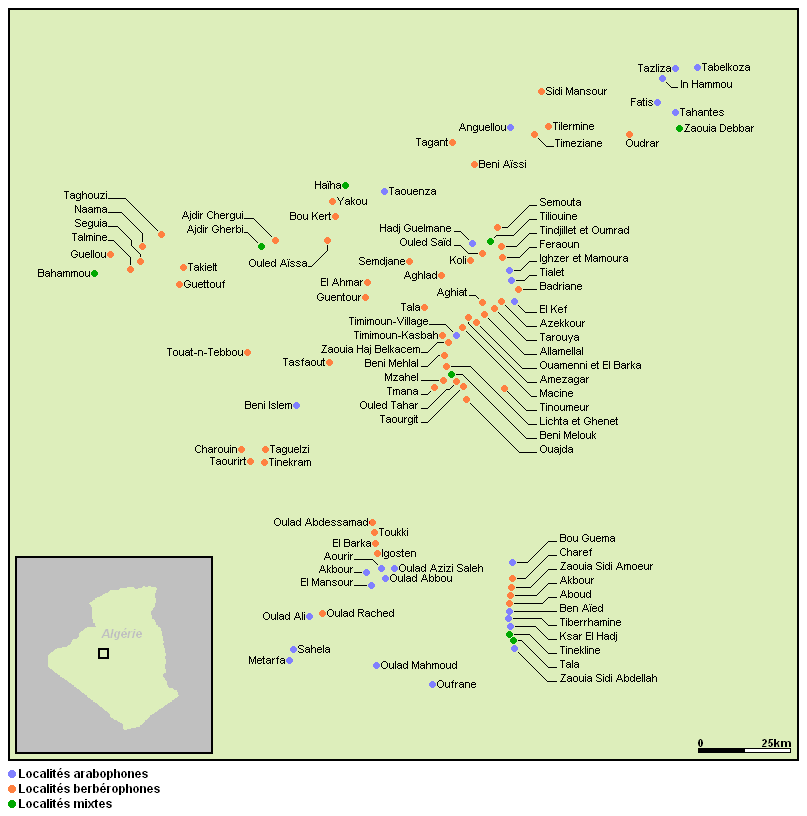
- Map of the ksour of Gourara by spoken language

Gurara (Gourara) is a Zenati Berber language spoken in the Gourara (Tigurarin) region, an archipelago of oases surrounding the town of Timimoun in southwestern Algeria. Ethnologue gives it the generic name Taznatit ("Zenati"), along with Tuwat spoken to its south; however, Blench (2006) classifies Gurara as a dialect of Mzab–Wargla and Tuwat as a dialect of the Riff languages.

== Characteristics ==
Gurara and Tuwat are the only Berber languages to change r in certain coda positions to a laryngeal ħ; in other contexts it drops r, turning a preceding schwa into a, and this latter phenomenon exists also in Zenata Rif-Berber in the far northern Morocco.

There is inconclusive evidence for Songhay influence on Gurara.

=== Ahellil ===
The local tradition of ahellil poetry and music in Gurara, described in Mouloud Mammeri's L'Ahellil du Gourara, has been listed as part of the Intangible Cultural Heritage of Humanity by UNESCO.
