= N'Goussa =

Town in Algeria

N'Goussa ﻧﻘﻮﺳﺔ
- Commune and town

- Location within Algeria
- Coordinates: 32°8′27″N 5°18′30″E
- Country: Algeria
- Province: Ouargla Province
- District: N'Goussa District (coextensive)
- Established: 1984

Area
  - Total: 2,740 km^{2} (1,060 sq mi)
- Elevation: 127 m (417 ft)

Population (2008)
  - Total: 16,581
  - Density: 6.05/km^{2} (15.7/sq mi)
- Time zone: UTC+1 (CET)

N'Goussa (Arabic: ﻧﻘﻮﺳﺔ) is a town and commune, coextensive with the district of the same name, in Ouargla Province, Algeria. Some of its inhabitants speak the Ouargli language. As of 2008 the population of the town was 19,039, up from 13,344 in 1998, with an annual population growth rate of 2.2%. The town is on a local road, about 20 kilometres (12 mi) north of Ouargla.

== Climate ==
N'Goussa has a hot desert climate (Köppen climate classification BWh), with very hot summers and mild winters. Rainfall is light and sporadic, and summers are particularly dry.

== Education ==
4.4% of the population has a tertiary education, and another 12.2% has completed secondary education. The overall literacy rate is 73.3%, and is 82.4% among males and 64.1% among females.

== Localities ==
The commune is composed of 14 localities:

- N'Goussa
- Frane
- El Bour
- Hassi El Khefif
- El Khobna
- Oglat Larbaa
- Ben Azzouz
- Debiche
- Hamraya
- Ouahda
- Chegga
- Hassi Maali
- El Koum
- Hassi Cheta
