= Mozabite language =

Berber language spoken in Saharan Algeria

Mozabite
- تونژابت
- Tumẓabt ⵜⵓⵎⵥⴰⴱⵜ
- Native to: Algeria
- Region: M'zab (wilaya of Ghardaïa)
- Ethnicity: Mozabite
- Native speakers: 200,000 (2022)
- Language family: Afro-Asiatic: Berber; Northern; Zenati; Mzab–Wargla; Mozabite
- Writing system: Arabic alphabet, Tifinagh, Berber Latin alphabet

Language codes
- ISO 639-3: mzb
- Glottolog: tumz1238
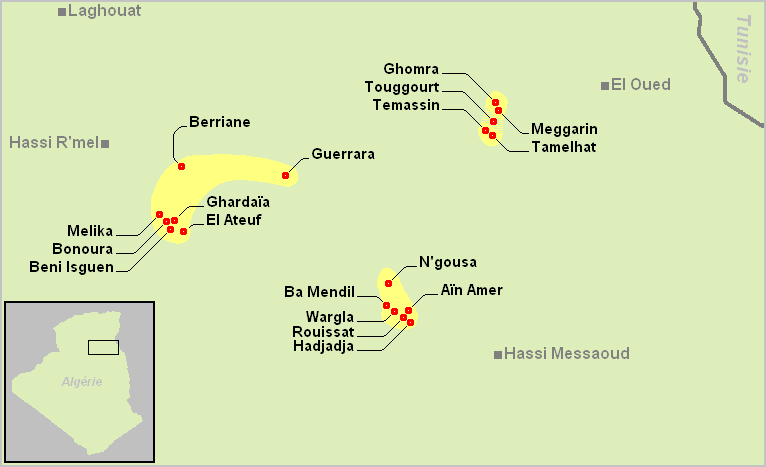
- Berber-speaking areas of the Mzab, Ouargla, and Oued Righ

Mozabite (endonym: tamazight), also known as Mzab, Tumẓabt or Ghardaia, is a Zenati language spoken by the Mozabites, an Ibadi Berber group inhabiting the seven cities of the M'zab natural region in the northern Saharan Algeria. It is also spoken by small numbers of Mozabite emigrants in other local cities and elsewhere. Mozabites also use Algerian Arabic. As of 2010, UNESCO estimated there to be about 150,000 Mozabite speakers.

Mozabite is one of the Mzab–Wargla languages, a dialect cluster of the Zenati languages.

== Bibliography ==
- ابراهيم و بكير عبد السلام. الوجيز في قواعد الكتابة و النحو للغة الأمازيغية "المزابية". المطبعة العرببة: غرداية 1996.
- Delheure, Jean. Aǧraw n Yiwalen Tumẓabt d-Tefṛansist = Dictionnaire Mozabite–Francais. SELAF. Paris, 1984.
