= Hassi Messaoud =

Hassi Messaoud حاسي مسعود
- Commune
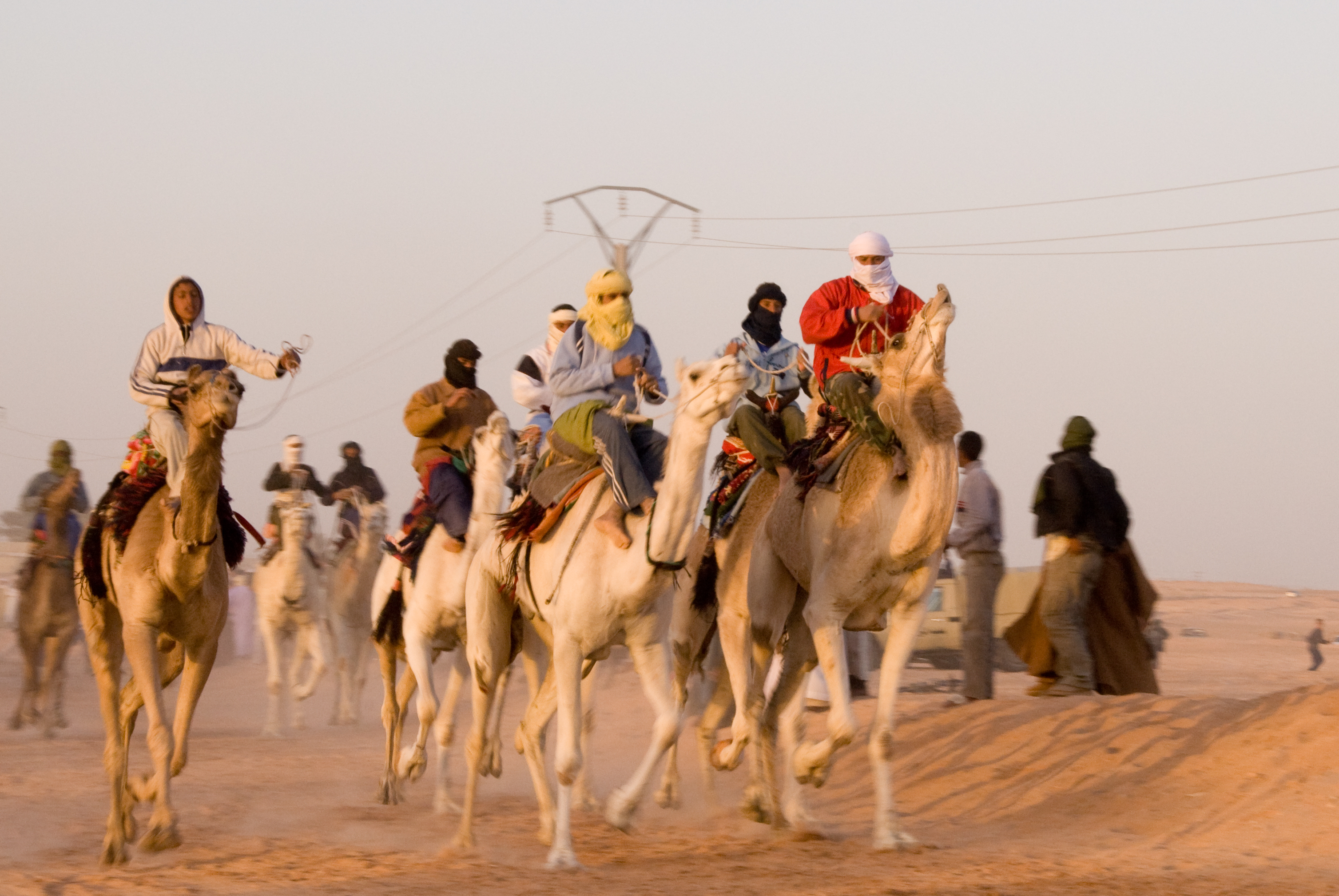
- A local camel race

- Location of Hassi Messaoud commune within Ouargla Province

- Location of Hassi Messaoud within Algeria
- Coordinates: 31°42′N 6°4′E
- Country: Algeria
- Province: Ouargla
- District: Hassi Messaoud (seat)

Area
  - Total: 71,237 km^{2} (27,505 sq mi)

Population (2008)
  - Total: 45,147
  - Density: 0.63376/km^{2} (1.6414/sq mi)
- Time zone: UTC+01 (CET)
- Postal code: 30500
- ONS code: 3004

Hassi Messaoud (Arabic: حاسي مسعود) is a town in Ouargla Province, eastern Algeria, located 85 kilometres (53 mi) southeast of Ouargla. As of 2008 it had a population of 45,147 people, up from 40,360 in 1998, and an annual population growth rate of 1.1%, the lowest in the province. Oil was discovered there in 1956 and the town's prominence has grown rapidly since then; it is considered as the First Energy town in Algeria where all the big oil and gas companies have offices and bases. It is an oil refinery town named after the first oil well. A water well, dug in 1917, can be found on the airport side of town. Today there are over 800 wells within a 25 kilometres (16 mi) radius of the town.

== History ==
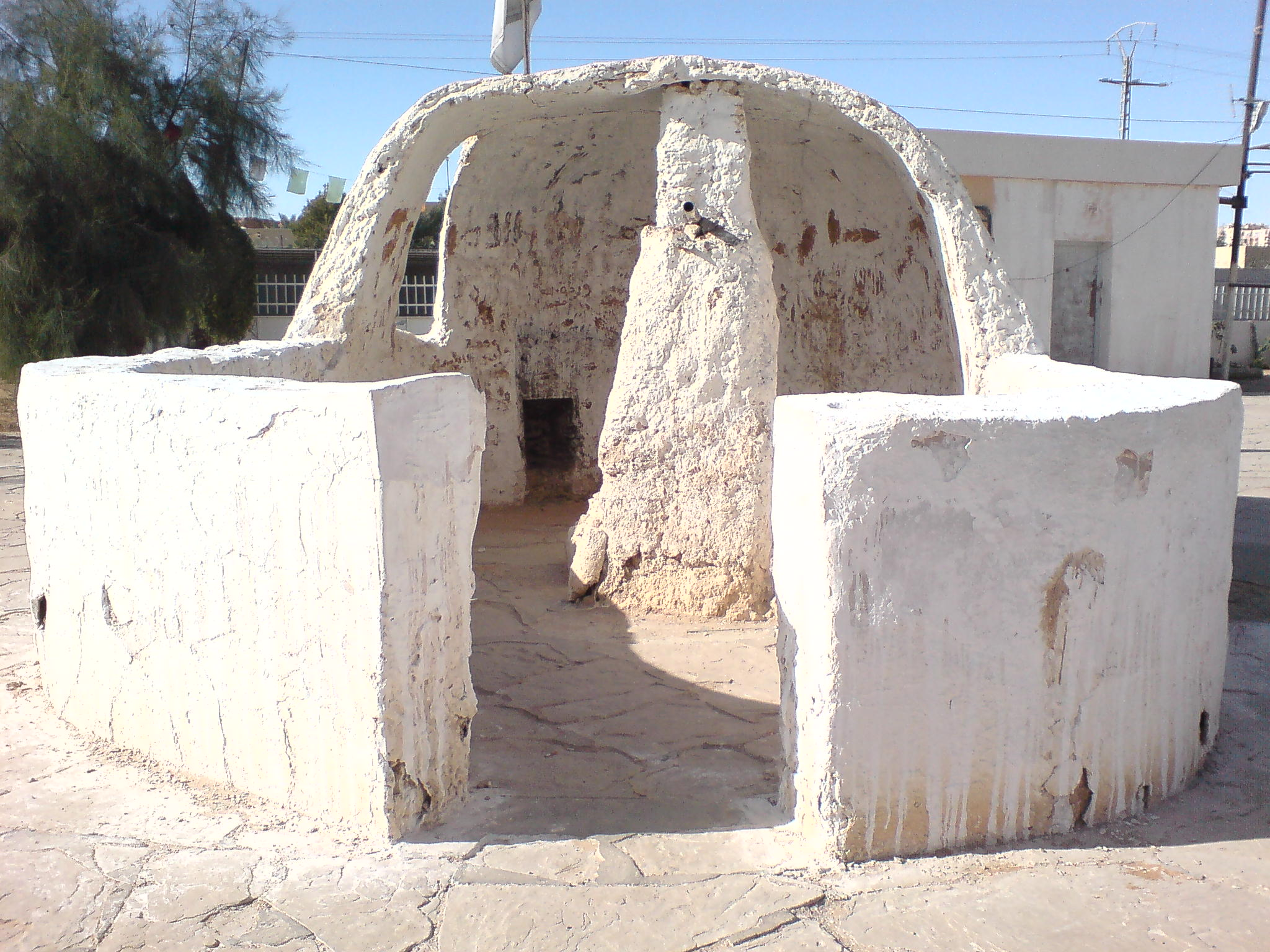
The Historical Hassi Messaoud Well

The Name Hassi Messaoud means "the well of Messaoud" in Arabic, named after Messaoud Rouabeh, a well-digger in the region. Before the discovery of oil in the region, Hassi Messaoud was not very populated. After discovering oil in the region in the 1950s the French built two petroleum bases. After the nationalization of oil and gas in the early 70s, the bases became property of Sonatrach (the national oil and gas company).

In 1984, and after a new administrative zoning, Hassi Messaoud became a municipality (a local district) with a local assembly. After that date people started populating the town independently. Sonatrach has imported ready-built houses, approximately 2000 units. Now Hassi Messaoud is a town with more than 60,000 inhabitants (non official source), without counting those living in the oil and gas company bases. The town contains several bases for the oil and gas companies, where Algerian and foreign people are working and living. As of 2008, Hassi Messaoud has an oil field with estimated reserves of 8 billion barrels, and the Hassi R ̓Mel gasfield has estimated reserves of 50 trillion cubic feet of gas and 2 billion barrels of crude oil.

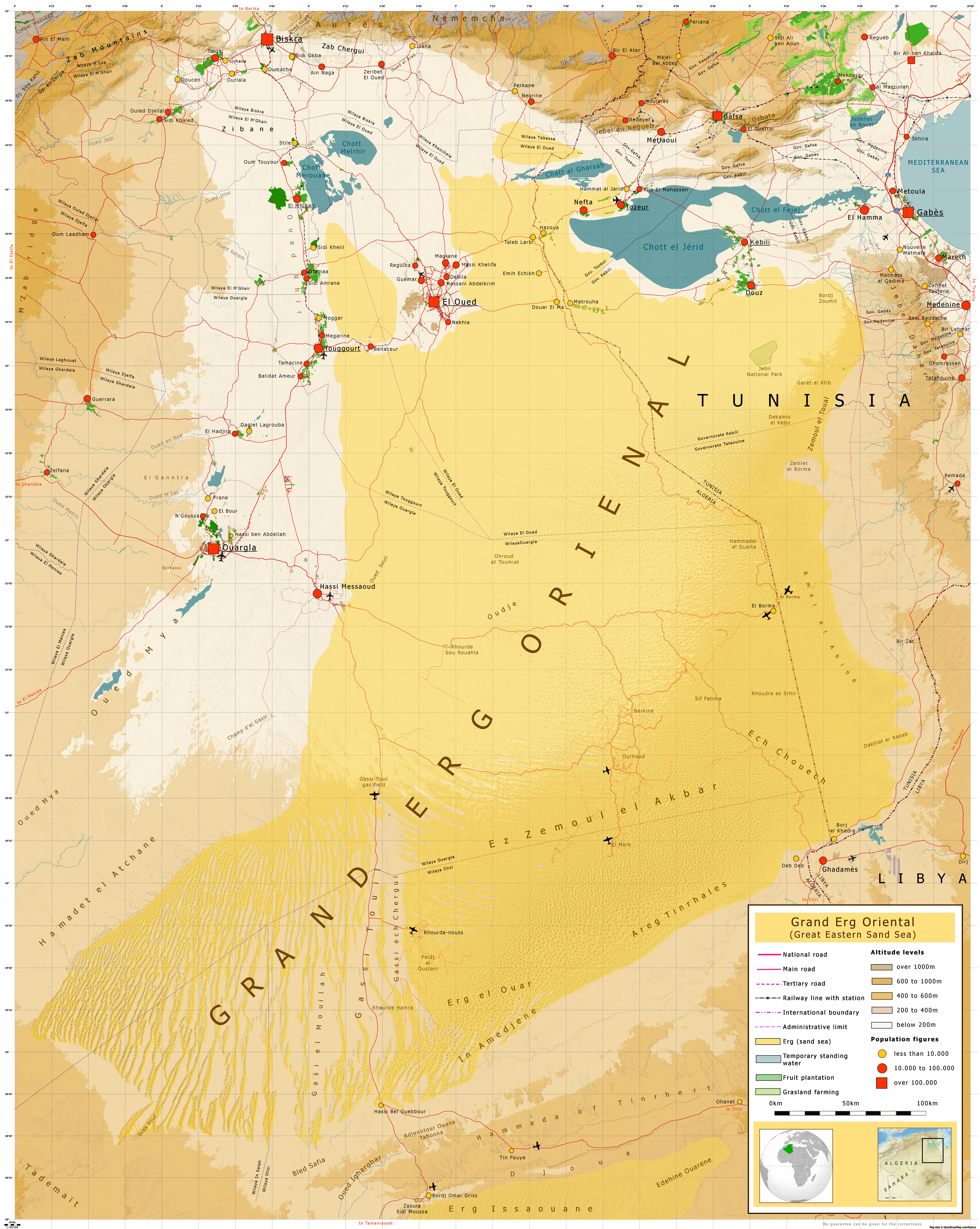
Grand Erg Oriental with Hassi Messaoud in the center

=== Attacks against women ===
In 2010 Amnesty International reported that mob attacks against single women accused of being prostitutes were taking place in Hassi Messaoud. According to Amnesty International there are reports that "some women have been sexually abused" and were targeted "not just because they are women, but because they are living alone and are economically independent."

== Climate ==
Hassi Messaoud has a hot desert climate (Köppen climate classification BWh) with long, extremely hot summers and short, warm winters and little rainfall throughout the year. Average high temperatures are consistently over 40 °C (104 °F) during 4 months (June, July, August and September) to reach a maximum of over 45 °C (113 °F) in July but temperatures have been known to sometimes soar to 50 °C (122 °F) or even above. Temperatures in January range from 4.6 °C (40.3 °F) at night to 18.6 °C (65.5 °F). The annual average high temperature is 32.2 °C (90.0 °F) and the average low temperature is 18.1 °C (64.6 °F). Average annual rainfall is about 44 millimetres (1.7 in). The absolute highest temperature ever recorded is 54.2 °C (129.6 °F) (although dubious) but the absolute lowest temperature ever recorded is −2.2 °C (28.0 °F).

Sand storms are common before summer time (from March to June), lasting from 6 hours to 4 days. These storms vary in their intensity but in general they prevent any outdoors activity and driving becomes very hazardous.

Climate data for Hassi Messaoud (1991-2020)
Month	Jan	Feb	Mar	Apr	May	Jun	Jul	Aug	Sep	Oct	Nov	Dec	Year
Record high °C (°F)	27.2 (81.0)	37.0 (98.6)	40.8 (105.4)	44.4 (111.9)	46.7 (116.1)	49.4 (120.9)	50.1 (122.2)	49.9 (121.8)	47.6 (117.7)	42.0 (107.6)	34.4 (93.9)	29.7 (85.5)	50.1 (122.2)
Mean daily maximum °C (°F)	18.3 (64.9)	20.7 (69.3)	25.3 (77.5)	30.1 (86.2)	35.3 (95.5)	40.2 (104.4)	43.2 (109.8)	42.4 (108.3)	37.8 (100.0)	31.4 (88.5)	23.8 (74.8)	19.0 (66.2)	30.6 (87.1)
Daily mean °C (°F)	11.5 (52.7)	13.7 (56.7)	18.2 (64.8)	22.8 (73.0)	27.9 (82.2)	32.7 (90.9)	35.5 (95.9)	35.0 (95.0)	30.9 (87.6)	24.7 (76.5)	17.2 (63.0)	12.5 (54.5)	23.6 (74.5)
Mean daily minimum °C (°F)	4.7 (40.5)	6.7 (44.1)	11.1 (52.0)	15.5 (59.9)	20.5 (68.9)	25.1 (77.2)	27.8 (82.0)	27.5 (81.5)	23.9 (75.0)	18.0 (64.4)	10.6 (51.1)	6.1 (43.0)	16.5 (61.7)
Record low °C (°F)	−3.3 (26.1)	−2.1 (28.2)	1.5 (34.7)	6.7 (44.1)	10.1 (50.2)	15.0 (59.0)	19.5 (67.1)	22.5 (72.5)	14.0 (57.2)	6.0 (42.8)	0.3 (32.5)	−2.1 (28.2)	−3.3 (26.1)
Average precipitation mm (inches)	3.5 (0.14)	2.5 (0.10)	6.5 (0.26)	4.0 (0.16)	2.9 (0.11)	0.2 (0.01)	0.0 (0.0)	0.6 (0.02)	4.1 (0.16)	4.8 (0.19)	3.9 (0.15)	3.4 (0.13)	36.4 (1.43)
Average precipitation days (≥ 1.0 mm)	0.9	0.6	0.9	0.4	0.6	0.1	0.0	0.1	0.8	0.8	0.7	0.7	6.6
Average relative humidity (%)	59.7	48.7	39.7	34.5	30.1	25.4	22.9	25.1	34.6	44.4	52.3	60.0	39.8
Source 1: NOAA
Source 2: climatebase.ru (extremes, humidity), (note: dubious readings around 54°C in July/August not included)

== Transportation ==
The town has a coach and taxi station which serves all major cities in the country. It is served by the Oued Irara Airport, located 8.5 km southeast of the city centre. It features domestic scheduled passenger service. Hassi Messaoud lies on the N3 national highway between Touggourt and Biskra to the north and Illizi and Djanet to the south. To the north of the town, the N49 branches off the N3 to the west, connecting to Ouargla.

== Localities ==
The commune is composed of seven localities:

- Centre Ville Hassi Messaoud
- Haoud El Hamra
- Gassi Touil
- Nezla
- Oued Tayeh
- El Gassi
- Irara

== Geology ==
The Hassi Messaoud oil field is a Cambrian sandstone reservoir 270 m thick in a dome 3300 m deep and 1300 km^{2} in area of the Oued Mya structural basin. The top of the dome is marked by an unconformity at the base of the Triassic, Mesozoic sediments consisting of salt, anhydrite, shale, limestone, dolomite and marl, all overlain by Mio-Pliocene sandstone. A refraction seismic survey showed the structure and the Md No. 1 well discovered oil in 1956.
