= Ouargla Province =

Province of Algeria

Ouargla Province ولاية ورقلة
- Province
- Map of Algeria highlighting Ouargla
- Coordinates: 31°57′N 5°19′E
- Country: Algeria
- Capital: Ouargla

Area
  - Total: 194,552 km^{2} (75,117 sq mi)

Population (2008)
  - Total: 552,539
  - Estimate (2019): 708,463
  - Density: 2.84006/km^{2} (7.35572/sq mi)
- Time zone: UTC+01 (CET)
- Area Code: +213 32
- ISO 3166 code: DZ-30
- Districts: 6
- Municipalities: 10

Ouargla or Warqla (Arabic: ولاية ورقلة) is a province (wilaya) in eastern Algeria, with a population of 708 463 inhabitants in 2019. Its capital is Ouargla. Other localities include Hassi Ben Abdellah and Hassi Messaoud. It borders Ouled Djellal Province, El M'Ghair Province Touggourt Province, and El Oued Province to the north, Tunisia to the east, In Salah Province and Illizi Province to the south, and El Menia Province, Ghardaia Province and Djelfa Province to the west. It contains the Issaouane Erg desert.

== History ==
In the past Ouargla was the center of trading of gold and slaves, as well as being an important center of Ibadi Islam. However, the Ibadis left for the M'zab valley.

In 1984 Illizi Province was carved out of its territory.

In 2019, Touggourt Province was carved out of its territory.

== Administrative divisions ==
The province is divided into 5 districts (daïras), which are further divided into 8 communes or municipalities.

=== Districts ===
District	Commune	Arabic
El Borma District	El Borma	البرمة
Hassi Messaoud District	Hassi Messaoud	حاسي مسعود
N'Goussa District	N'Goussa	ﻧﻘﻮﺳﺔ
Ouargla District	Ouargla	ورقلة
Ouargla District	Rouissat	اﻟﺮوﻳﺴﺎت
Sidi Khouïled District	Aïn Beida	ﻋﻴﻦ اﻟﺒﻴﻀﺎء
Sidi Khouïled District	Hassi Ben Abdellah	ﺣﺎﺳﻲ ﺑﻦ ﻋﺒﺪ اﷲ
Sidi Khouïled District	Sidi Khouiled	ﺳﻴﺪي ﺧﻮﻳﻠﺪ

== Geology ==
The region lies within the Algerian Triassic Sedimentary basin containing numerous oil and gas fields, including the Alrar gas field. Production is from Triassic sandstones with Andesitic seals and the Gothlandian shale as a source rock. Major fields include the Hassi R'Mel gas field, Haoud-Berkaolu, Ben-Kahla, and the Guellala.
