= Ouargla =

Ouargla ورقلة (Arabic) Wargrən (Berber languages)
- City
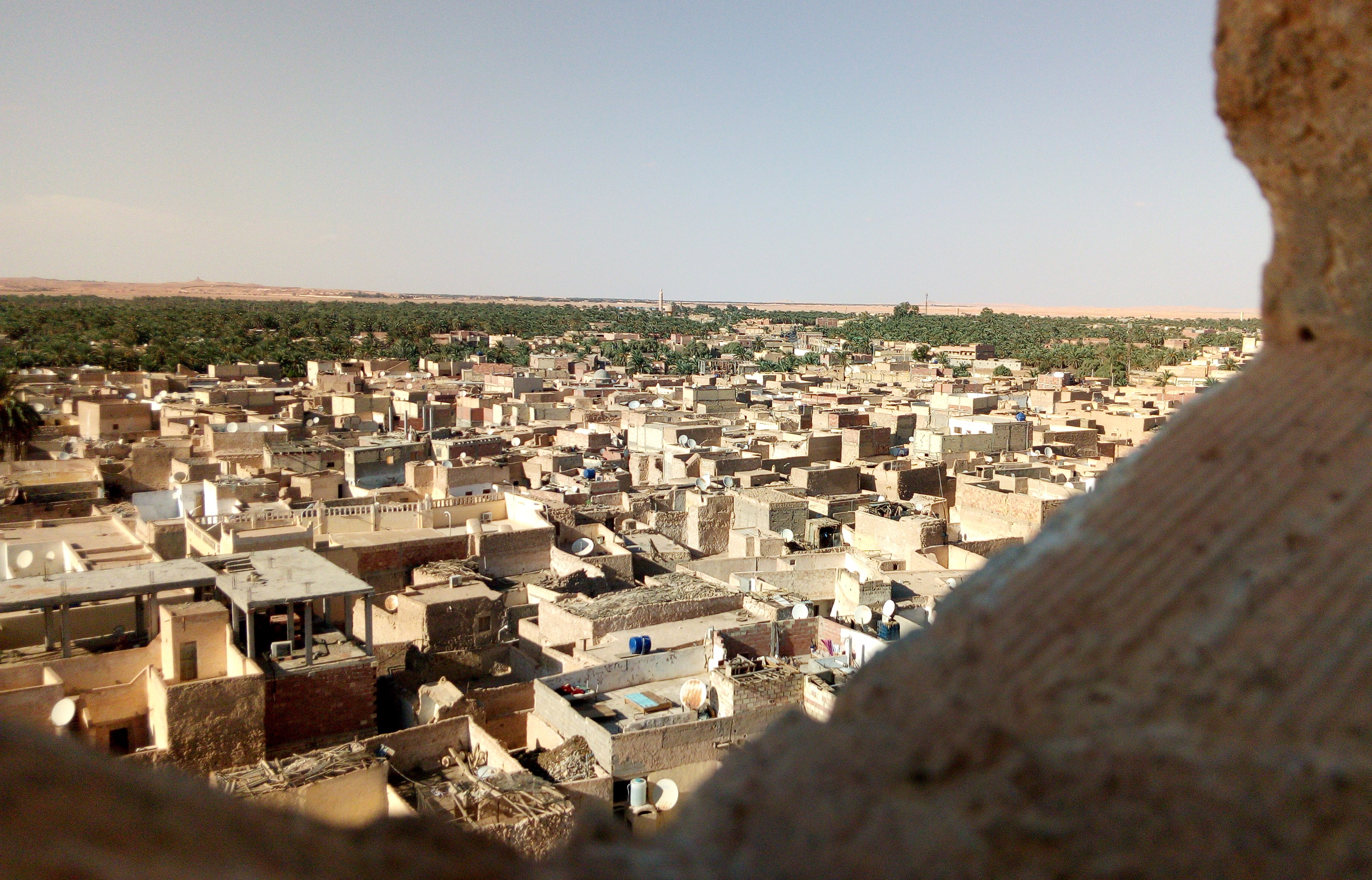

- Location of Ouargla commune within Ouargla Province

- Location of Ouargla within Algeria
- Coordinates: 31°57′N 5°19′E
- Country: Algeria
- Province: Ouargla Province
- District: Ouargla District
- Elevation: 219 m (719 ft)

Population (2008)
  - City: 133,024
  - Urban: 191,136
- Time zone: UTC+1 (CET)
- Postal code: 30000

Ouargla (Berber languages: Wargrən,, Arabic: ورقلة, romanized: Warqalah) is the capital city of Ouargla Province in the Sahara Desert in southern Algeria. It has a flourishing petroleum industry and hosts one of Algeria's universities, the University of Ouargla. The commune of Ouargla had a population of 133,024 in the 2008 census, up from 112,339 in 1998, and an annual population growth rate of 1.7%. However, including the commune of Rouissat, found in Ouargla's urban area, gives a total population of 191,136.

== Historical Ouargla ==
Trade routes of the Western Sahara Desert c. 1000-1500. Goldfields are indicated by light brown shading: Bambuk, Bure, Lobi, and Akan.

According to Ibn Khaldun, the town was founded by Banu Wargla who, accompanied by sections of the Maghrawa and Banu Ifran, left the Tlemcen region and founded Ouargla. These Berbers of Ouarghla then embraced Ibadi doctrines, which later made the town an attractive refuge for the citizens of Tahert.

In the 11th century, Banu Hilal, an Arab tribe living between Nile and Red Sea, settled in Tunisia, Tripolitania (western Libya) and Constantinois (eastern Algeria) which was Ouargla party. After his vassality to the Ottoman Empire with a recognised autonomy since 1555, the area was conquered in 1855 by the French. In the 19th century, the town was known for being on a caravan route to the south, and a starting point for exploring the southern Sahara.

== Modern Ouargla ==
The city was a significant tourist attraction until the civil unrest of the 1990s. Many tourists shopped for sand roses at the souk l'ehjar, the old rock market. The souq, or market, had many traditional shops filled with antiques, traditional crafts, and various local items ranging from dresses to stuffed reptiles. The area across from these shops was used to display sand roses and mineral specimens of all sizes and shapes. The market has since gone through a renovation process.

Not far from the souk l'ehjar is the old farmers’ market, or the "Sunday market", as it is called by the locals. It, too, is located in the centre of the old city, La Kasbah. At its centre, the original old market is shaped as a circle and split into small arcs. The centre circular structure is now a meat market, surrounded by rows of grocers' and farmers' stalls selling all sorts of fresh produce and fruits. Next to the old market are the two oldest mosques in the city, al-Masjid al-Atiq, which literally means "the old mosque," and the old Ibadi mosque, home to one of the most renowned Islamic scholars of the city, Taleb et-Tayeb.

Some of Ouargla's population speak the Wargli language, part of the Zenati languages subgroup of the Northern Berber languages, and Wargli speakers reside in N'Goussa, as well.

== Climate ==
Ouargla has a desert climate (Koppën climate classification BWh) typical of the Sahara Desert in which it is located. The city has very long and extremely hot summers and short and pleasant winters. The average temperatures of the city are the highest of the big cities of Algeria which Ouargla is part of. The temperature of July, which is the hottest month, is around 110 °F (43 °C). The heat becomes persistent and unpleasant in summer with temperatures sometimes exceeding 120 °F (49 °C). On average, the city of Ouargla has a temperature equal to or greater than 95 °F (35 °C) for more than 135 days and 100 °F (38 °C) for more than 83 days. The year with the most days with a temperature equal to or greater than 100 °F was in 2014 with 99 days, while the lowest total was 39 days in 1981. By comparison, the city of Carpentras in France had a total of 16 days since 1963 when the temperature was equivalent or above 100 °F. The highest minimum temperature recorded at Ouargla was 36.6 °C (97.9 °F) on July 31, 2005. The highest temperature was recorded on August 13, 1984, at 53.5 °C (128.3 °F), although that reading is disputed by some meteorologists thus leaving reading 51.3 °C (124.3 °F) recorded on 5 July 2018 as the highest reliable reading for Ouargla, for Algeria and for whole continent of Africa.

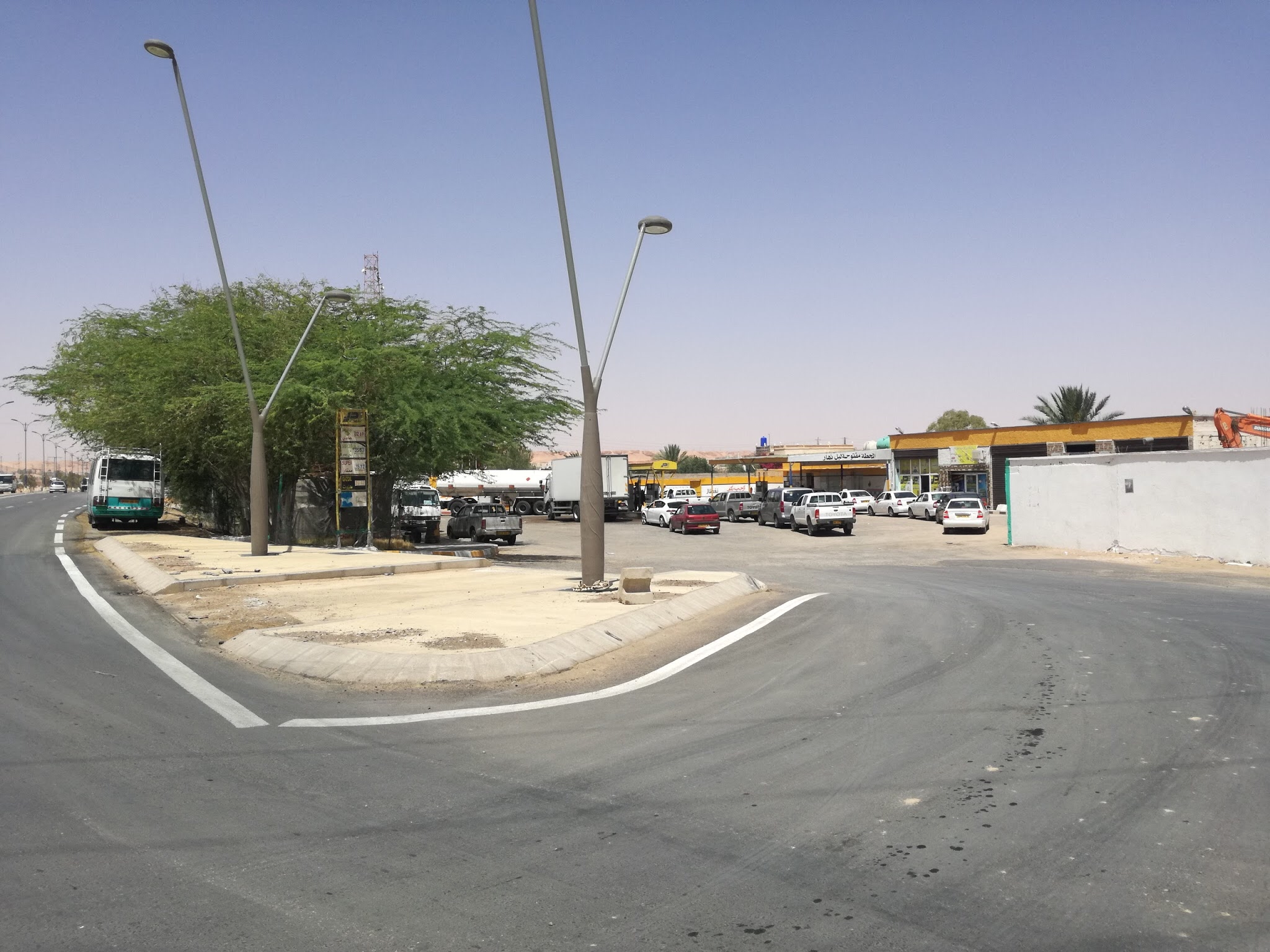
A petrol station in Ouargla

The climate is particularly arid and not very rainy with clear skies most of the time. The rainfall recorded in the city of Ouargla is limited to only 55 mm (2.2 in) per year in average. The most rainy year lived in Ouargla was that of 1903 with 135 mm (5.3 in). The most arid year was that of 1929 with 0 mm. The year of 1903, which was the rainiest in Ouargla, still had nine constant months with a rainfall of 0 mm, from February to October. January is the rainiest month with 12.4 mm (0.49 in). August is the driest with 0.3 mm (0.012 in).

Ouargla rarely sees days with a minimum temperature below 0°C. However, if one moves away from the urban area of Ouargla, frost is much more frequent in the periphery of the city. The record for the number of days below zero was in 1983 with 7 days during the month of January and 7 days during the month of December for a total of 14 days. The city sees an average of 5 days below 0°C per year. The winter with the most frost in Ouargla was from 1999 to 2000 with a total of 55 days. Snow is very rare in Ouargla, and only occurs in exceptional cases and in a small quantity. The lowest temperature recorded at Ouargla is −3.7 °C (25.3 °F) on January 16, 2001, while the lowest maximum temperature is 8 °C (46 °F) on January 27, 2005.

Climate data for Ouargla (1991-2020, extremes 1963–present)
Month	Jan	Feb	Mar	Apr	May	Jun	Jul	Aug	Sep	Oct	Nov	Dec	Year
Record high °C (°F)	28.3 (82.9)	37.2 (99.0)	40.2 (104.4)	41.5 (106.7)	46.7 (116.1)	50.3 (122.5)	51.3 (124.3)	50.4 (122.7)	47.7 (117.9)	42.3 (108.1)	38.9 (102.0)	31.4 (88.5)	51.3 (124.3)
Mean daily maximum °C (°F)	18.6 (65.5)	20.9 (69.6)	25.4 (77.7)	29.9 (85.8)	35.2 (95.4)	40.3 (104.5)	43.5 (110.3)	42.6 (108.7)	37.7 (99.9)	31.5 (88.7)	24.0 (75.2)	19.3 (66.7)	30.7 (87.3)
Daily mean °C (°F)	11.7 (53.1)	13.7 (56.7)	18.0 (64.4)	22.4 (72.3)	27.6 (81.7)	32.6 (90.7)	35.6 (96.1)	35.0 (95.0)	30.5 (86.9)	24.4 (75.9)	17.1 (62.8)	12.7 (54.9)	23.4 (74.1)
Mean daily minimum °C (°F)	4.7 (40.5)	6.5 (43.7)	11.4 (52.5)	14.9 (58.8)	20.0 (68.0)	24.8 (76.6)	27.7 (81.9)	27.3 (81.1)	23.4 (74.1)	17.3 (63.1)	11.3 (52.3)	6.0 (42.8)	16.3 (61.3)
Record low °C (°F)	−3.7 (25.3)	−2.0 (28.4)	0.0 (32.0)	3.0 (37.4)	8.9 (48.0)	14.7 (58.5)	17.0 (62.6)	18.0 (64.4)	13.0 (55.4)	5.0 (41.0)	−1.5 (29.3)	−3.0 (26.6)	−3.7 (25.3)
Average precipitation mm (inches)	5.7 (0.22)	2.1 (0.08)	5.7 (0.22)	1.5 (0.06)	3.0 (0.12)	0.4 (0.02)	0.2 (0.01)	0.8 (0.03)	4.1 (0.16)	5.4 (0.21)	4.6 (0.18)	3.7 (0.15)	37.2 (1.46)
Average precipitation days (≥ 1.0 mm)	1.0	0.4	1.0	0.5	0.5	0.2	0.1	0.1	1.1	1.0	0.7	0.6	7.2
Source 1: NOAA
Source 2: Arab Meteorology Book (humidity and sun), Meteo Climat (record highs and lows)

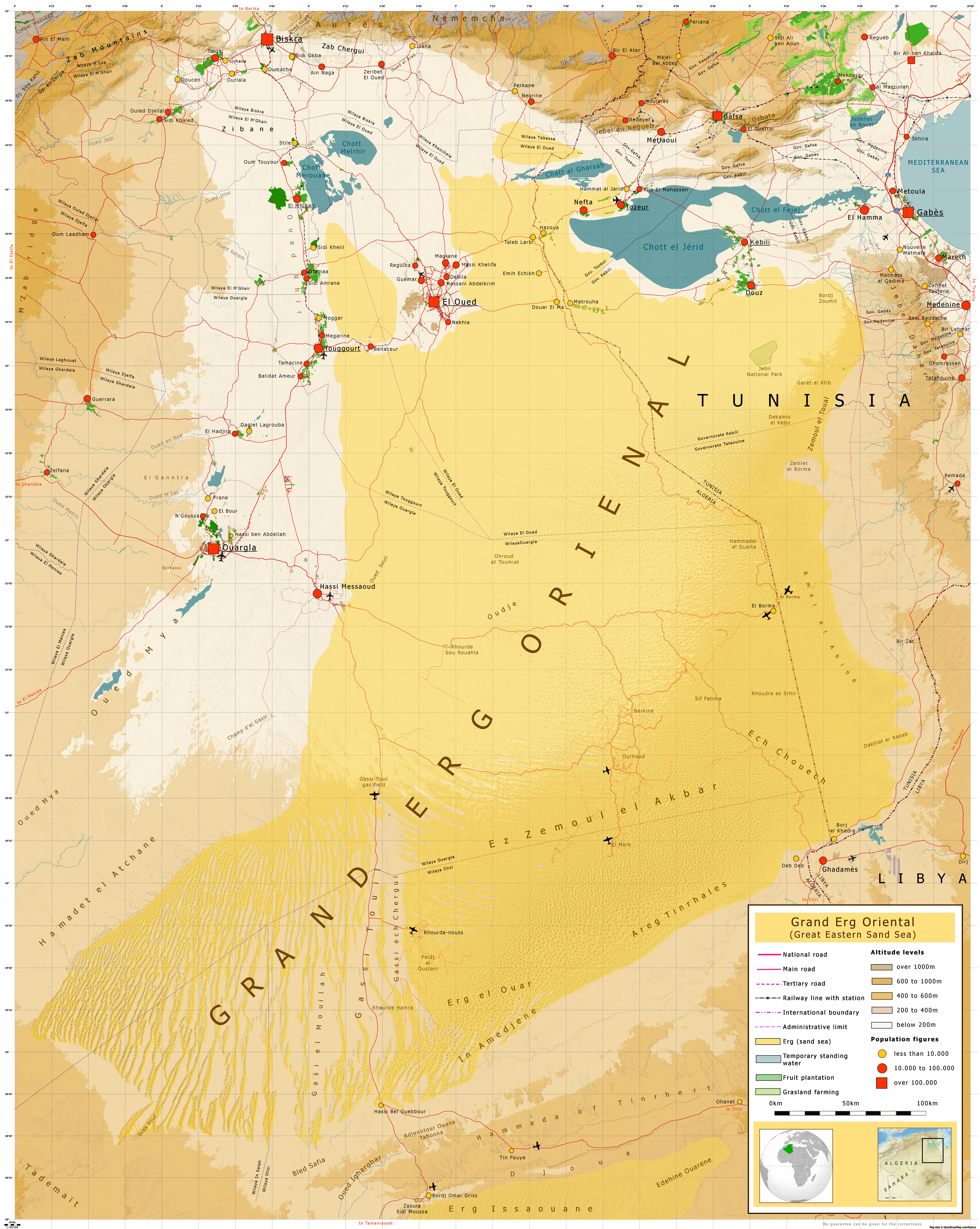
Grand Erg Oriental with Ouargla in the middle left

== Localities ==
The commune comprises 15 localities:

- Mekhadma
- Beni Thour
- Ville de Ouargla
- Saïd Otba Est
- Saïd Otba Ouest
- Ba Mendil
- Bouameur
- Bour El Haïcha
- Sidi Amrane
- Gharbouz
- Sidi Boughoufala
- Melala Ksar
- Hassi Miloud
- Zone d'Activité
- Delalha (Sidi Amrane)

== See also ==
- Berbers and Islam
- University Kasdi Merbah Ouargla
