= Arfiane El Bared =

- Village
- Location within Algeria
- Coordinates: 33°39′21″N 5°58′45″E
- Country: Algeria
- Province: El M'Ghair Province
- District: Djamaâ District
- Commune: Tendla
- Elevation: 26 m (85 ft)
- Time zone: UTC+1 (CET)

Arfiane El Bared (also known as El Arfiane) is a village in the commune of Tendla, in Djamaâ District, El M'Ghair Province, Algeria. The village is located just to the east of the N3 highway, 14 kilometres (8.7 mi) north of Djamaa, on the Biskra-Touggourt railway. The local road W303 leads through the village from the N3 towards Tendla.
