= Tamerna Guedima =

- Village
- Location within Algeria
- Coordinates: 33°27′36″N 5°57′45″E
- Country: Algeria
- Province: El M'Ghair Province
- District: Djamaâ District
- Commune: Sidi Amrane
- Elevation: 53 m (174 ft)
- Time zone: UTC+1 (CET)

Tamerna Guedima (also written Tamerna Kedima or just Kedima) is a village in the commune of Sidi Amrane, in Djamaâ District, El M'Ghair Province, Algeria. The village is located to the west of the N3 highway 8 kilometres (5.0 mi) south of Djamaa.
