= El Khoubna =

- Village
- Location within Algeria
- Coordinates: 33°6′10″N 6°24′39″E
- Country: Algeria
- Province: Touggourt Province
- District: Taibet District
- Commune: Taibet
- Elevation: 99 m (325 ft)
- Time zone: UTC+1 (CET)

El Khoubna (also written El Khobna) is a village in the commune of Taibet, in Taibet District, Touggourt Province, Algeria. The village is located 2.5 kilometres (1.6 mi) northeast of Taibet and 33 kilometres (21 mi) east of Touggourt.
