= Chémora =

- Village
- Location within Algeria
- Coordinates: 33°27′52″N 5°58′38″E
- Country: Algeria
- Province: El M'Ghair Province
- District: Djamaâ District
- Commune: Sidi Amrane
- Elevation: 51 m (167 ft)
- Time zone: UTC+1 (CET)

Chémora (also written Chemoura) is a village in the commune of Sidi Amrane, in Djamaâ District, El M'Ghair Province, Algeria. The village is located on the western side of the N3 highway 8 kilometres (5.0 mi) south of Djamaa.
