= Aïn Choucha =

- Village
- Location within Algeria
- Coordinates: 33°24′55″N 5°58′11″E
- Country: Algeria
- Province: El M'Ghair Province
- District: Djamaâ District
- Commune: Sidi Amrane
- Elevation: 64 m (210 ft)
- Time zone: UTC+1 (CET)

Aïn Choucha is a village in the commune of Sidi Amrane, in Djamaâ District, El M'Ghair Province, Algeria. The village is located on the western side of the N3 highway 13 kilometres (8.1 mi) south of Djamaa.
