= Tamellaht =

- Town
- Location within Algeria
- Coordinates: 33°0′43″N 6°0′35″E
- Country: Algeria
- Province: Touggourt Province
- District: Témacine District
- Commune: Tamacine
- Elevation: 82 m (269 ft)
- Time zone: UTC+1 (CET)

Tamellaht is a town in the commune of Tamacine, in Témacine District, Touggourt Province, Algeria. The village is located 2 kilometres (1.2 mi) southwest of Tamacine and 11 kilometres (6.8 mi) south of Touggourt.
