= Goug =

- Village
- Location within Algeria
- Coordinates: 32°54′18″N 6°0′22″E
- Country: Algeria
- Province: Touggourt Province
- District: Témacine District
- Commune: Balidat Ameur
- Elevation: 96 m (315 ft)
- Time zone: UTC+1 (CET)

Goug (also known as El Goug) is a village in the commune of Balidat Ameur, in Témacine District, Touggourt Province, Algeria. The village is located 5.5 kilometres (3.4 mi) southeast of Balidat Ameur and 23 kilometres (14 mi) south of Touggourt.
