= Tamerna Djedida =

- Village
- Location within Algeria
- Coordinates: 33°26′45″N 5°57′22″E
- Country: Algeria
- Province: El M'Ghair Province
- District: Djamaâ District
- Commune: Sidi Amrane
- Elevation: 63 m (207 ft)
- Time zone: UTC+1 (CET)

Tamerna Djedida is a village in the commune of Sidi Amrane, in Djamaâ District, El M'Ghair Province, Algeria. The village is located along a short road on the western side of the N3 highway, 10 kilometres (6.2 mi) south of Djamaa.
