= El Har Ihira =

Moggar
- Village
- Location within Algeria
- Coordinates: 33°14′36″N 6°2′39″E
- Country: Algeria
- Province: Touggourt Province
- District: Megarine District
- Commune: Sidi Slimane
- Elevation: 60 m (200 ft)
- Time zone: UTC+1 (CET)

El Har Ihira (also written El Harihira) is a village in the commune of Sidi Slimane, in Megarine District, Touggourt Province, Algeria. The village is located 7 kilometres (4.3 mi) southwest of Sidi Slimane and 15 kilometres (9.3 mi) north of Touggourt.
