= Mazer Zaouia =

- Village
- Location within Algeria
- Coordinates: 33°34′40″N 5°59′44″E
- Country: Algeria
- Province: El M'Ghair Province
- District: Djamaâ District
- Commune: Djamaa
- Elevation: 29 m (95 ft)
- Time zone: UTC+1 (CET)

Mazer Zaouia (sometimes written just Mazer) is a village in the commune of Djamaa, in Djamaâ District, El M'Ghair Province, Algeria. The village is located just to the east of the N3 highway 4 kilometres (2.5 mi) north of Djamaa.
