= Oum Zebed =

- Village
- Location within Algeria
- Coordinates: 33°9′17″N 6°17′58″E
- Country: Algeria
- Province: Touggourt Province
- District: Taibet District
- Commune: M'Naguer
- Elevation: 100 m (330 ft)
- Time zone: UTC+1 (CET)

Oum Zebed (also known as Oum ez Zebed el djadida ) is a village in the commune of M'Naguer, in Taibet District, Touggourt Province, Algeria. The village is located 5 kilometres (3.1 mi) northwest of M'Naguer and 27 kilometres (17 mi) east of Touggourt.

== Population ==
People of Oum Zebed belong to Arch "Ouled Sayah" (Arch means clan ), named after the ancestor of these people and many others in the region nearby, who is Sidi Mohammed Sayah. Originally from Telemcen City, he was called sayah, which means "voyager" because of his journeys from Telemcen towards many placese.
