= Benaceur =

Benaceur ﺑﻦ ﻧﺎﺻﺮ
- Commune and town
- Location of Benaceur commune within Ouargla Province

- Location of Benaceur within Algeria
- Coordinates: 33°06′39″N 6°26′28″E
- Country: Algeria
- Province: Touggourt Province
- District: Taibet District
- Established: 1984

Area
  - Total: 1,668 km^{2} (644 sq mi)
- Elevation: 70 m (230 ft)

Population (2008)
  - Total: 10,330
  - Density: 6.193/km^{2} (16.04/sq mi)
- Time zone: UTC+1 (CET)

Benaceur (Arabic: ﺑﻦ ﻧﺎﺻﺮ) (sometimes written Ben Nasseur) is a town and commune in Taibet District, Touggourt Province, Algeria. According to the 2008 census it has a population of 10,330, up from the 1998 census when it had a population of 7,808. The annual population growth rate is estimated at 2.9%.

== History ==
The area was initially settled in the mid-19th century.

== Geography ==
Benaceur lies at an elevation of 70 metres (230 ft) surrounded by the palm trees of its oasis, one of many scattered oases lying between Touggourt and El Oued. Beyond the oasis are the sand dunes of the Grand Erg Oriental desert.

== Transportation ==
Benaceur lies directly on the N16 national highway between Touggourt to the west and El Oued to the east. Nearby towns include M'Naguer, directly on the N16 5 kilometres (3.1 mi) to the west, and Taibet, the district capital, which is 6 kilometres (3.7 mi) to the southwest and accessible by a local road that leaves the N16 to the south. Benaceur is 200 kilometres (120 mi) by road from the provincial capital, Ouargla.

== Economy ==
The economy of the area is primarily agricultural, centered on palm farming as well as other crops such as potatoes, onions, and garlic. There are an estimated 9521 goats, 1230 sheep, 850 camels, and around 20 cows in the district.

The other main industry in Benaceur is the textile industry, mainly focused on wool and cotton.

== Infrastructure ==
Drinking water is available to 98% of the population. However, a sewerage system for all residents has not yet been completed.

== Education ==
There are nine elementary schools and one secondary school in the town.

== Localities ==
The commune is composed of nine localities:

- Benaceur
- Benaceur El Gharbi
- Khoubent
- El Mezabi
- Erg Debadib
- Sokra
- Omih El Righi
- El Mor
- Chouchat Chaamba
