= Sidi Yahia, Algeria =

Sidi Yahia
- Village
- Location within Algeria
- Coordinates: 33°31′18″N 5°56′44″E
- Country: Algeria
- Province: El M'Ghair Province
- District: Djamaâ District
- Commune: Djamaa
- Elevation: 54 m (177 ft)
- Time zone: UTC+1 (CET)

Sidi Yahia is a village in the commune of Djamaa, in Djamaâ District, El M'Ghair Province, Algeria. The village is located on a local road leading to M'Rara, about 4 kilometres (2.5 mi) west of Djamaa.
