= Tigdidine =

- Village
- Location within Algeria
- Coordinates: 33°32′19″N 6°1′22″E
- Country: Algeria
- Province: El M'Ghair Province
- District: Djamaa District
- Commune: Djamaa
- Elevation: 38 m (125 ft)
- Time zone: UTC+1 (CET)

Tigdidine (also written Tiguedidine) is a village in the commune of Djamaa, in El M'Ghair Province, Algeria. The village is 4 kilometres (2.5 mi) east of Djamaa.
