= Meggarine Guedima =

- Village
- Location within Algeria
- Coordinates: 33°12′2″N 6°6′2″E
- Country: Algeria
- Province: Touggourt Province
- District: Megarine District
- Commune: Megarine
- Elevation: 68 m (223 ft)
- Time zone: UTC+1 (CET)

Meggarine Guedima is a neighbourhood of the oasis town of Megarine, in southeast of Algeria. Administratively, it forms part of the municipality of Meggarine, which belongs to Touggourt Province, Algeria. The village is located 10 kilometres (6.2 mi) east of the provincial capital Touggourt.
