= Moggar =

- Village
- Location within Algeria
- Coordinates: 33°16′2″N 6°4′4″E
- Country: Algeria
- Province: Ouargla Province
- District: Megarine District
- Commune: Sidi Slimane
- Elevation: 60 m (200 ft)
- Time zone: UTC+1 (CET)

Moggar is a village in the commune of Sidi Slimane, in Megarine District, Ouargla Province, Algeria. The village is located 3 kilometres (1.9 mi) southwest of Sidi Slimane and 18 kilometres (11 mi) north of Touggourt.
