= Ourglana =

- Village
- Location within Algeria
- Coordinates: 33°33′15″N 5°59′39″E
- Country: Algeria
- Province: El M'Ghair Province
- District: Djamaa District
- Commune: Djamaa
- Elevation: 45 m (148 ft)
- Time zone: UTC+1 (CET)

Ourglana (also written Ourlana) is a village in the commune of Djamaa, in El M'Ghair Province, Algeria. The village is 2 kilometres (1.2 mi) north-east of Djamaa.
