= M'Naguer =

M'Naguer اﻟﻤﻨﻘﺮ
- Commune and town

- Location within Algeria
- Coordinates: 33°7′35″N 6°21′07″E
- Country: Algeria
- Province: Touggourt Province
- District: Taibet District
- Established: 1984

Area
  - Total: 8,892 km^{2} (3,433 sq mi)
- Elevation: 98 m (322 ft)

Population (2008)
  - Total: 14,179
  - Density: 1.595/km^{2} (4.130/sq mi)
- Time zone: UTC+1 (CET)

M'Naguer (also written M'Nagueur) is a town and commune in Taibet District, Touggourt Province, Algeria. According to the 2008 census it has a population of 14,179, up from 11,243 in 1998, and an annual population growth rate of 2.4%.

== Geography ==
M'Naguer lies at an elevation of 98 metres (322 ft) surrounded by palm groves, forming one of many scattered oases lying between Touggourt and El Oued. Beyond the oasis are the sand dunes of the Grand Erg Oriental desert.

== Climate ==
Like most towns in Saharan Africa, M'Naguer has a hot desert climate, with very hot summers and mild winters, and very little precipitation throughout the year.

== Economy ==
Agriculture is the primary economic activity of M'Naguer, accounting for 63% of the economy. Palm farming is the most significant crop, although other fruits and vegetables are grown, along with the rearing of livestock such as sheep, goats, camels and cattle.

The economy of M'Naguer also benefits from tourism; the oasis, the diversity of plants and animals, and architectural sites are important attractions. Traditional industries such as pottery, weaving and knitting are also significant.

== Transportation ==
M'Naguer lies on the N16 national highway between Touggourt 35 kilometres (22 mi) to the west and El Oued 60 kilometres (37 mi) to the northeast. The district capital Taibet is 6 kilometres (4 mi) to the south via a local road, and the town of Benaceur is located on the N16 5 kilometres (3 mi) to the east. The town is 190 kilometres (120 mi) distant from the provincial capital Ouargla.

The municipality of M'Naguer has an estimated 119 kilometres (74 mi) of local roads.

== Education ==
2.8% of the population has a tertiary education (the second lowest in the province), and another 11.8% has completed secondary education. The overall literacy rate is 66.1%, and is 75.3% among males (the second lowest in the province) and 56.3% among females.

== Localities ==
The commune is composed of 16 localities:

- M'Nagueur El Gherbi
- El Bahri
- El Hamraya
- Oum Zebed Dahraouia
- Oum Zebed Zaouia
- Mouih El Kebche
- Mouih Benali
- Mouih Righi Gebli
- Chabbi
- Louibed
- Boutara
- El Asli
- Sliaa
- Tarfaya
- Boukhechba
- Chott Merouane
