= Sidi Amrane =

Sidi Amrane ﺳﻴﺪي ﻋﻤﺮان
- Commune and town
- Location of Sidi Amrane commune within El M'Ghair Province

- Location of Sidi Amrane within Algeria
- Coordinates: 33°30′N 6°1′E
- Country: Algeria
- Province: El M'Ghair Province
- District: Djamaa District
- Elevation: 46 m (151 ft)

Population (2008)
  - Total: 21,772
- Time zone: UTC+1 (CET)

Sidi Amrane (Arabic: ﺳﻴﺪي ﻋﻤﺮان) (also written Sīdī Amran) is a town and commune in Djamaa District, El M'Ghair Province, Algeria, 5 kilometres (3.1 mi) south of Djamaa. According to the 2008 census it has a population of 21,772, up from 18,732 in 1998, and an annual growth rate of 1.5%.

== Climate ==
Sidi Amrane has a hot desert climate (Köppen climate classification BWh), with very hot summers and mild winters. Rainfall is light and sporadic, and summers are particularly dry.

== Transportation ==
Sidi Amrane is connect by two short local roads to the national highway N3; one road leads directly west, and the other leads north through Djamaa. The N3 runs from Biskra in the north to Touggourt in the south. There is also a station on the Biskra-Touggourt railway line at Djamaa.

== Education ==
5.8% of the population has a tertiary education, and another 17.2% has completed secondary education. The overall literacy rate is 78.4%, and is 85.1% among males and 72.1% among females.

== Localities ==
The commune of Sidi Amrane is composed of six localities:

- Sidi Amrane
- Aïn Choucha
- Tamerna Djedida
- Tamerna Guedima
- Zaoualia
- Chémora
