= Megarine =

Megarine اﻟﻤﻘﺎرﻳﻦ
- Commune and town

- Location within Algeria
- Coordinates: 33°11′40″N 6°5′40″E
- Country: Algeria
- Province: Touggourt Province
- District: Mégarine District
- Elevation: 68 m (223 ft)

Population (2008)
  - Total: 13,751
- Time zone: UTC+1 (CET)

Megarine (Arabic: اﻟﻤﻘﺎرﻳﻦ) is a town and commune in Touggourt Province, Algeria, located just north of the city of Touggourt. According to the 2008 census it has a population of 13,751, up from 10,996 in 1998, and an annual growth rate of 2.3%.

== Geography ==
Megarine lies in a large area of palm plantations on an oasis network that extends from Sidi Slimane past Touggourt through to Balidat Ameur. Beyond the oases is the arid and barren landscape of the Sahara, featuring areas of sand dunes (ergs) and flat rocky plains (regs).

== Climate ==
Megarine has a hot desert climate (Köppen climate classification BWh), with very hot summers and mild winters. Rainfall is light and sporadic, and summers are particularly dry.

== Transportation ==
Megarine is connected to the N3 national highway via a short 2.5 kilometres (1.6 mi) long local road. From the intersection, the town is connected to Biskra to the north, and Touggourt 9 kilometres (5.6 mi) to the south.

The train line from Biskra to Touggourt also runs near the town at the junction of the local road with the N3. While there is no station here, there is a station in Touggourt.

== Education ==
6.4% of the population have tertiary education, and another 16.9% have completed secondary education. The overall literacy rate is 80.6%, and is 87.5% among males and 74.1% among females.

== Localities ==
The commune is composed of five localities:

- Meggarine Djedida
- Meggarine Guedima
- Amiche
- El Ksour
- Ghamra
