= El Hadjira =

El Hadjira اﻟﺤﺠﻴﺮة
- Commune and Town

- Location within Algeria
- Coordinates: 32°37′N 5°31′E
- Country: Algeria
- Province: Ouargla Province
- District: El Hadjira District
- Elevation: 126 m (413 ft)

Population (2008)
  - Total: 14,965
  - Density: 7.34/km^{2} (19.0/sq mi)
- Sources: Population, Density
- Time zone: UTC+1 (CET)

El Hadjira is a town and commune, and capital of El Hadjira District, in Ouargla Province, Algeria. According to the 2008 census it has a population of 14,965, up from 12,781 in 1998, and an annual population growth rate of 1.6%.

== Geography ==
El Hadjira lies about halfway between the two main cities in the province, Touggourt and Ouargla. Vegetation (mostly consisting of palm groves in the area) is supported by groundwater, as most of the surface is usually dry. The landscape in the area is a mix of barren rocky plains and sand dunes.

== Climate ==
Like other towns in the Sahara, El Hadjira has a hot desert climate, with very hot summers and mild winters, and little precipitation year-round. Temperatures may reach as high as 50 °C (122 °F) in summer and as low as 6 °C (43 °F) in winter. Strong wind is common, and in the winter fog may also occur.

== Economy ==
The main economic focus of the area is agriculture, particularly the cultivation of date palms; 3576 hectares of land are currently used for this purpose, including an estimated 95,030 palms. The rearing of livestock is also practiced, with an estimated 20364 goats, 11080 sheep and 1605 camels.

Tourism is also important to the area; local tourist attractions include the desert landscape and local architecture, and archaeological sites.

Aside from the above, there is very little industry in El Hadjira, mainly consisting of construction work, which provides about 300 jobs. Local reservoirs contain mud and gypsum used to construct the town's buildings.

== Transportation ==
El Hadjira is on the provincial road W33 which connects the N3 highway to the east to El Allia and El Guerrara (in Ghardaia Province) to the west. The N3 then connects to Touggourt to the north and Hassi Messaoud to the south. Another local road leads south to N'Goussa and the provincial capital Ouargla.

== Localities ==
The commune is composed of 24 localities:

- El Hadjira-centre
- Lagraf
- Rachedi
- El Mir
- Debidibi
- Mehada
- El Metguedema
- Zit
- Hassi Maamar
- Guedachi
- El Mekhfi
- Oued N'Sa
- El Maleh
- Louguila
- Erg Edam
- Aïn Okèche
- Hassi Chouli
- Aïn Sahn
- Chahna
- El Alandaya
- Dhoukkara
- Baghdad
- Aïn Bosmaha
- Aïn Benithour
