= Sidi Yahya =

Sidi Yahya may refer to:

== People ==
- Arabic name of John the Baptist, who is a prophet in Islam.
- Sidi Yaya Keita, Malian footballer

== Places ==
=== Morocco ===
- Sidi Yahya El Gharb, town in Kénitra Province
- Sidi Yahya Ou Youssef, commune in Khénifra Province
- Sidi Yahya Ou Saad, commune in Sefrou Province
- Sidi Yahya Bni Zeroual, commune in Taounate Province

=== Algeria ===
- Sidi Yahia, Algeria

=== Mali ===
- Sidi Yahya Mosque in Mali
