= El Allia =

El Allia اﻟﻌﺎﻟﻴﺔ
- Commune and town
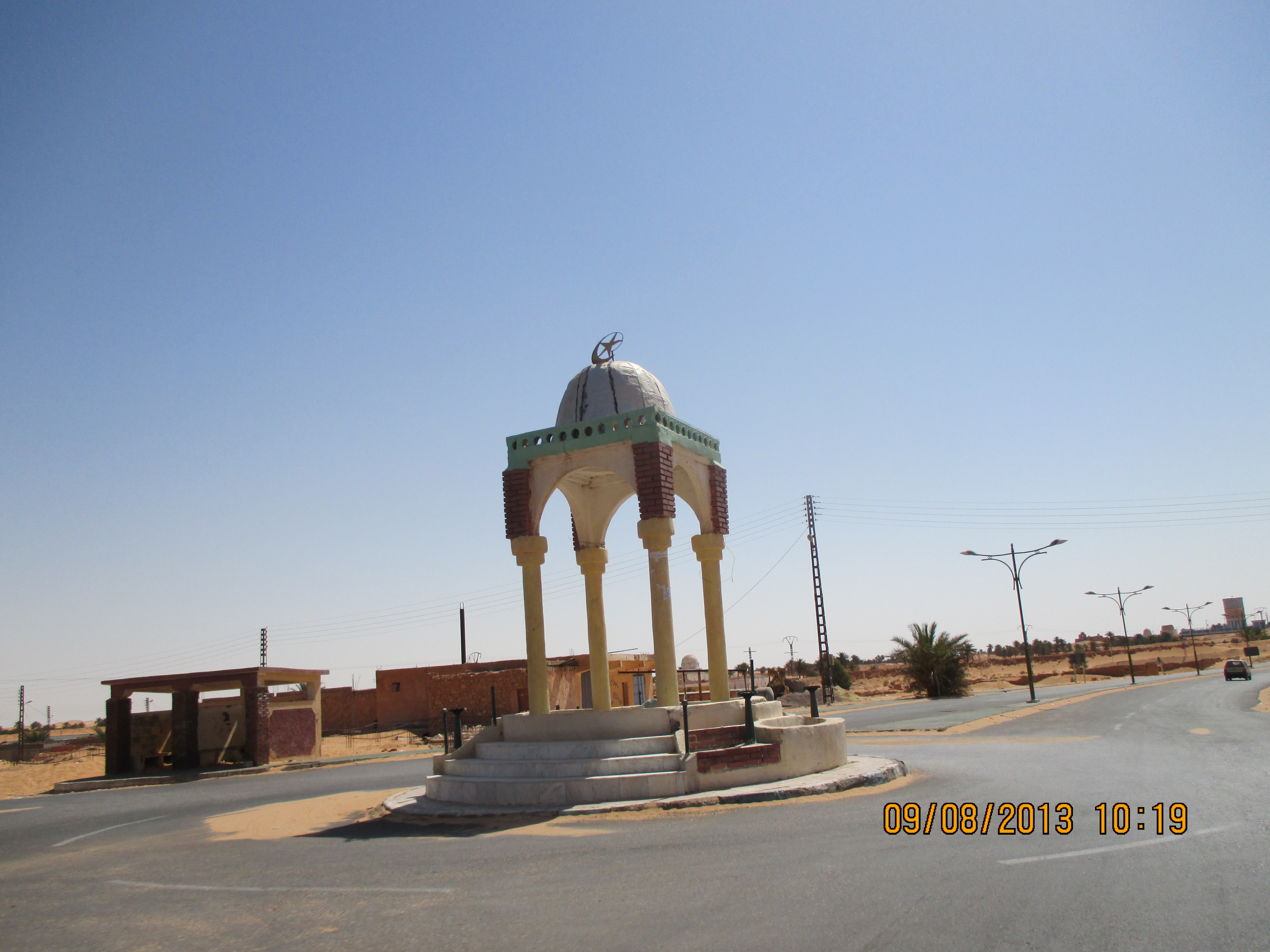

- Location of El Allia commune within Ouargla Province

- Location of El Allia within Algeria
- Coordinates: 32°41′51″N 5°25′32″E
- Country: Algeria
- Province: Ouargla Province
- District: El Hadjira District
- Commune established: 1984

Area
  - Total: 6,589 km^{2} (2,544 sq mi)
- Elevation: 118 m (387 ft)

Population (2008)
  - Total: 7,509
  - Density: 1.140/km^{2} (2.952/sq mi)
- Time zone: UTC+1 (CET)

El Allia (Arabic: اﻟﻌﺎﻟﻴﺔ) is a town and commune in El Hadjira District, Ouargla Province, Algeria. According to the 2008 census it has a population of 7,509, up from 6,530 in 1998, and an annual growth rate of 1.4%.

== Geography ==
El Allia lies about halfway between the two main cities in the province, Touggourt and Ouargla. Vegetation (mostly consisting of palm groves in the area) is supported by groundwater, as most of the surface is usually dry. The landscape in the area is a mix of barren rocky plains and sand dunes.

== Climate ==
Like other towns in the Sahara, El Allia has a hot desert climate, with very hot summers and mild winters, and little precipitation year-round. Temperatures may reach as high as 50 °C (122 °F) in summer and as low as 6 °C (43 °F) in winter.

== Economy ==
Agriculture is the main activity in El Allia. Dates, from date palms, are the most significant agricultural product, followed by mint. Other crops include fruits, vegetables and animal feed.

Animal husbandry is also an important activity, including that of sheep, camels, cattle and poultry.

Other industries in the area include the textile industry, and the production of gypsum and gravel. Tourism is also significant, with visitors attracted to local mosques and palaces.

== Transportation ==
El Hadjira is on the provincial road W33 which connects the N3 highway to the east to Berriane (in Ghardaia Province) to the west. El Hadjira, the district capital is nearby on the road to the west and El Guerrara (in Ghardaia Province) is on the road to the west. The N3 then connects to Touggourt to the north and Hassi Messaoud to the south. Another local road leads south from El Hadjira to N'Goussa and the provincial capital Ouargla.

== Localities ==
The commune is composed of 12 localities:

- El Allia-centre
- Taïbine
- Chegga
- Tzioua
- Hassi Daoula
- El Mourgui
- Remada
- Lekkaz
- El Mehila
- Larifdji
- Edh
- Baa
