= Tendla =

Tendla تندلة
- Commune and town
- Location of Tendla Commune within El M'Ghair Province

- Location of Tendla within Algeria
- Coordinates: 33°40′31″N 6°2′2″E
- Country: Algeria
- Province: El M'Ghair Province
- District: Djamaa District
- Elevation: 16 m (52 ft)

Population (2008)
  - Total: 9,193
- Time zone: UTC+1 (CET)

Tendla (also Tinedla or Tenedla) (Arabic: تندلة) is a town and commune in Djamaa District, El M'Ghair Province, Algeria. According to the 2008 census it has a population of 9,193, up from 8,033 in 1998, with an annual growth rate of 1.4%, the second-lowest in the province.

== Climate ==
Tendla has a hot desert climate (Köppen climate classification BWh), with very hot summers and mild winters. Rainfall is light and sporadic, and summers are particularly dry.

== Transportation ==
Tendla is at the eastern end of the regional road W303, which connects it to the N3 7 kilometres (4.3 mi) to the west. From there the N3 leads north to Biskra and south to Touggourt.

== Education ==
Among the residents, 3.4% of the population has a tertiary education, and another 13.6% has completed secondary education. The overall literacy rate is 73.8%, and is 81.5% among males and 66.2% among females.

== Localities ==
The commune of Tendla is composed of two localities:

- Tendla
- Arfiane El Bared
