= Ambam, Nigeria =

- Village
- Location within Nigeria
- Coordinates: 09°31′N 08°19′E
- Country: Nigeria
- State: Kaduna State
- LGA: Jamaa
- District: Tsonje
- Time zone: UTC+01:00 (WAT)
- Climate: Aw

Ambam, Nigeria is a village community in Tsonje/Sonje District of Jamaa Local Government Area, southern Kaduna state in the Middle Belt region of Nigeria. The postal code for the village is :801144

Ambam, village within the state, with a population of 174,152 people and an elevation of 782 meters above sea level.

The people within the settlement are Kaninkong tribe, Kaninkon people, also known as the Nikyob, are an indigenous group in the Ambam area, origins tied to oral traditions of migrating from Katsina (possibly Katsina-alla) in Benue State. Their history involves inter-clan conflicts, which led to the formation of two major clans, the Turan and Ngbechio, who settled in their current location. Historically, they were idol worshippers with a farming-based economy and were influenced by the ancient Nok culture.
