= M'Rara =

M'Rara ﻣﺮارة
- Commune and town
- Location of M'Rara commune within El M'Ghair Province

- Location of M'Rara within Algeria
- Coordinates: 33°28′36″N 5°39′37″E
- Country: Algeria
- Province: El M'Ghair Province
- District: Djamaa District
- Elevation: 113 m (371 ft)

Population (2008)
  - Total: 7,999
- Time zone: UTC+1 (CET)

M'Rara (Arabic: ﻣﺮارة) is a town and commune in Djamaa District, El M'Ghair Province, Algeria. According to the 2008 census it has a population of 7,999, up from 5,976 in 1998, with an annual growth rate of 3.0%.

== Climate ==
M'Rara has a hot desert climate (Köppen climate classification BWh), with very hot summers and mild winters, and very little precipitation throughout the year.

Climate data for M'Rara
Month	Jan	Feb	Mar	Apr	May	Jun	Jul	Aug	Sep	Oct	Nov	Dec	Year
Mean daily maximum °C (°F)	16.4 (61.5)	19.0 (66.2)	22.9 (73.2)	27.8 (82.0)	32.8 (91.0)	37.7 (99.9)	41.5 (106.7)	40.7 (105.3)	35.4 (95.7)	28.5 (83.3)	21.6 (70.9)	17.0 (62.6)	28.4 (83.2)
Daily mean °C (°F)	10.2 (50.4)	12.5 (54.5)	16.0 (60.8)	20.4 (68.7)	25.2 (77.4)	30.2 (86.4)	33.4 (92.1)	32.7 (90.9)	28.3 (82.9)	21.9 (71.4)	15.4 (59.7)	11.0 (51.8)	21.4 (70.6)
Mean daily minimum °C (°F)	4.0 (39.2)	6.1 (43.0)	9.2 (48.6)	13.0 (55.4)	17.6 (63.7)	22.8 (73.0)	25.3 (77.5)	24.7 (76.5)	21.3 (70.3)	15.3 (59.5)	9.2 (48.6)	5.1 (41.2)	14.5 (58.0)
Average precipitation mm (inches)	8 (0.3)	4 (0.2)	11 (0.4)	8 (0.3)	6 (0.2)	1 (0.0)	1 (0.0)	1 (0.0)	6 (0.2)	11 (0.4)	11 (0.4)	11 (0.4)	79 (2.8)
Source: climate-data.org

== Transportation ==
The main road out of M'Rara to the east joins the N3 highway at Djamaa. The N3 connects Biskra in the north to Touggourt in the south.

== Education ==
3.2% of the population has a tertiary education, and another 10.5% has completed secondary education. The overall literacy rate is 64.3%, and is 73.1% among males and 55.0% among females.

== Localities ==
The commune of M'Rara is composed of one locality:

- M'Rara
