= Lalla Aicha =

The name Lalla Aicha may refer to:

- Princess Lalla Aicha of Morocco (1931–2011), a royal family member
- Lalla Aicha, regent of Touggourt (reign 1833–1846), a ruler in Algeria
