= Abla Kemari =

Algerian human rights activist

Derama Kemari
- دراما قماري
- Born: Touggourt, Touggourt Province, Algeria
- Occupation: Human rights activist
- Years active: 2019–present
- Known for: Activism during the Hirak
- Criminal charges: Insulting the president Inciting hatred
- Criminal penalty: Three years imprisonment (one year suspended)
- Criminal status: Imprisoned

Derama "Abla" Kemari (Arabic: دراما “عبلة” قماري, romanized: Drāmā “ʻAblah” Qmāry) is an Algerian human rights activist. She became known for her social media posts during the emergence of the Hirak movement, particularly concerning corruption within the Algerian government and the socioeconomic situation for people living in the Algerian Desert. As a result of her activism, Kemari has experienced persecution from Algerian authorities, including two custodial prison sentences.

== Biography ==
Kemari was born and raised in Touggourt, the capital of Touggourt Province within the Algerian Sahara. While working for a bank, she became known locally for her volunteer work, including supporting refugees living in Touggourt and leading campaigns to clean the city's streets.

In February 2019, protests broke out across Algeria after the then-President of Algeria, Abdelaziz Bouteflika, announced his intention to run for a fifth presidential term. Kemari joined local protests, which soon expanded to include calls for an end to the influence of the Algerian People's National Army on the government and a democratic transition. Kemari became known for her use of Facebook to make posts and videos on various topics, including corruption within the Algerian government, and the oppression of activists and prisoners of conscience. She also highlighted socioeconomic issues facing people living in the Saharan provinces of Algeria. As a result of her activism, Kemari was sentenced on 29 December 2022 to one year in prison and a fine of 100,000 DZD by a court in Touggourt.

On 10 September 2024, an investigating judge at a court in Ouargla placed Kemari under judicial supervision and opened a criminal investigation into allegations that she had praised terrorism, spread ideas related to a terrorist ideology online, insulted the president, and published propaganda that could harm national interests. The evidence for the allegations relied heavily on posts and videos Kemari had made on Facebook, including those where she denounced the authorities' crackdown on protests, as well as issues of marginalisation, exclusion and administrative corruption. On 25 September 2025, the judge cancelled Kemari's judicial supervision, and Kemari was arrested at the bank where she worked and transferred to a prison in Hassi Ben Abdellah. Kemari subsequently went on hunger strike to protest the charges brought against her.

On 16 February 2025, an appeals court in Ouargla sentenced Kemari to three years in prison, with one year suspended, alongside a 300,000 DZD fine, following the original three year sentence made after finding her guilty of "insulting the president" and "incitement to hatred and discrimination"; the terrorism charges against Kemari had been dropped during the trial.

SHOAA for Human Rights, an Algerian non-governmental organisation, described Kemari's sentence as being about her "peaceful expression of legitimate social and political views", and accused Algerian authorities of "turning freedom of expression into a punishable offence".
