= Tebesbest =

Tebesbest ﺗﻴﺒسﺴﺖ
- Commune and town

- Location within Algeria
- Coordinates: 33°7′N 6°5′E
- Country: Algeria
- Province: Touggourt Province
- District: Touggourt District
- Established: 1984

Area
  - Total: 26 km^{2} (10 sq mi)
- Elevation: 85 m (279 ft)

Population (2008)
  - Total: 35,032
  - Density: 1,300/km^{2} (3,500/sq mi)
- Time zone: UTC+1 (CET)

Tebesbest is a town and commune in Touggourt District, Touggourt Province, Algeria, and forms a part of the urban area of Touggourt. According to the 2008 census it has a population of 35,032, up from 29,840 in 1998, and a population growth rate of 1.7%. It is a predominantly agricultural community, with dates being the main product.

== Localities ==
The commune is composed of seven localities:

- Quartier de Tebesbest
- Lebdouat
- Beni Assoued
- Ayad
- Z.H.U.N.
- El Bahdja I
- El Bahdja II
