= Sultanate of Tuggurt =

1414–1881, Berber state in North Africa

Sultanate of Tuggurt Tagelda n Tuggurt
- 1414–1881
- Capital: Tuggurt
- Common languages: Berber
- Religion: Islam
- Government: Monarchy
- Sultan
  - 1414–1431: Sulayman I
  - 1853–1854: Sulayman II
- History
  - Established: 1414
  - Tuggurt Expedition: 1552
  - Sahara Campaign: 1881
Succeeded by
French Algeria
- Today part of: Algeria

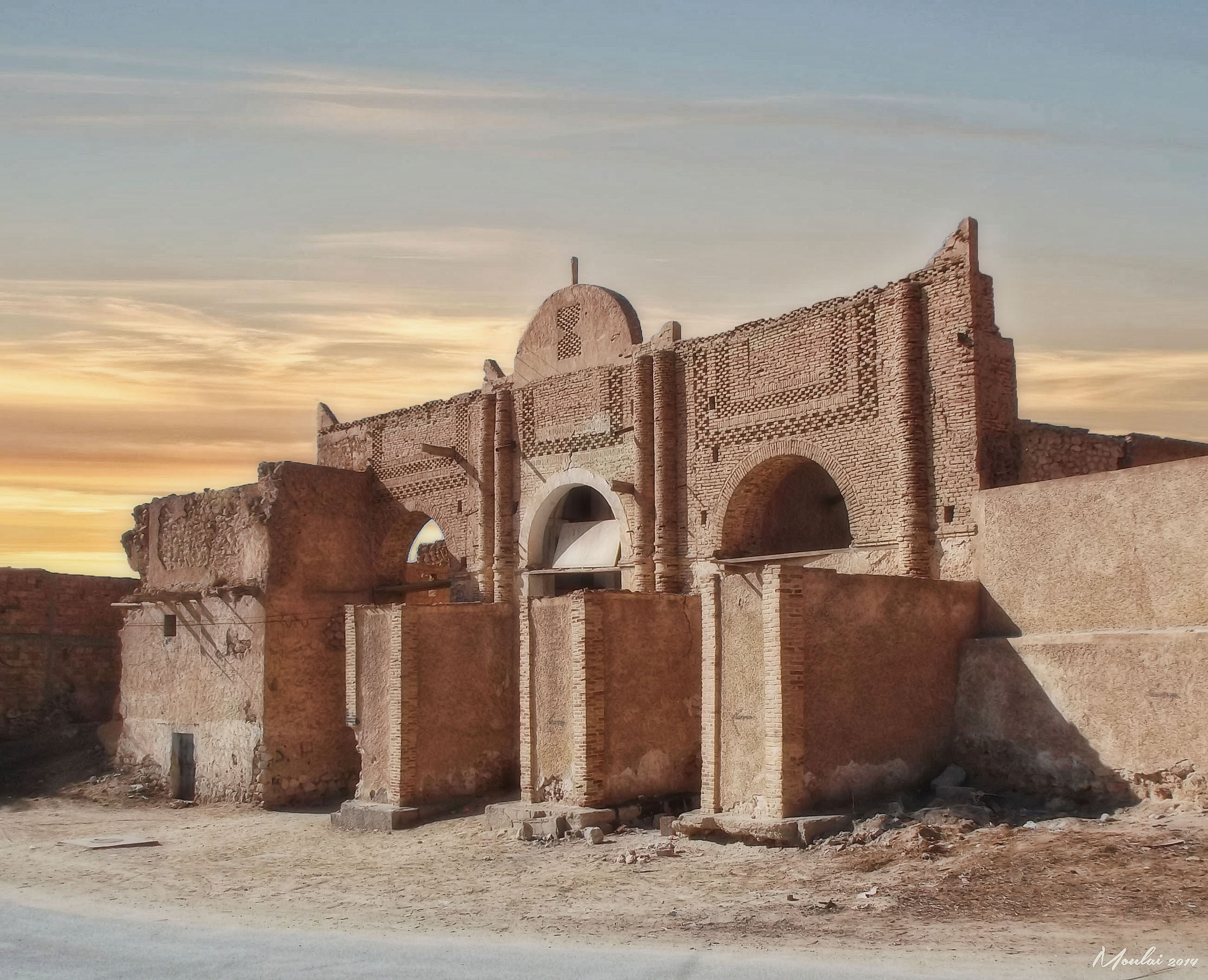
Palace of the Ait Djellab in Tuggurt.

The Sultanate of Tuggurt (Berber languages: Tagelda n Tuggurt) was a state that extended over Tuggurt, the oases of the neighbouring region and the Oued Righ valley between the fifteenth century and 1881. It was governed by sultans of the Berber dynasty of the Banu Djellab.

== Background ==
The city of Tuggurt was subject to the authority of the Hafsid dynasty like all other cities in the east of present-day Algeria. During the periods of turmoil, Tuggurt would revolt and refrain from paying taxes. Like what Yusuf ibn Hasan, a chief of Tuggurt did in the era of the Hafsid Sultan Abu 'Amr Uthman, who was obliged to Subjugate the city two times, one in 1449 and another in 1465. The Sultanate of Tuggurt came to birth in a period that witnessed the weakness and fall of the Hafsid dynasty.

== History ==
The Sultanate was founded in the fifteenth century by the Banu Djellab, a dynasty whose exact origins remain obscure. They claimed to be the last descendants of the Marinid dynasty, and thus modelled their court and ruling system, such as the use of a praetorian guard of black slaves, on that of the Moroccan sultans. According to the Encyclopedia of Islam, the founder was a certain Sulayman ibn Djellab, a Moroccan prince, related to the Marinid family, who after his return from the hajj founded a mosque in the region, and with the help of the local nomads, became recognised there as a ruler.

He felt secure enough to retain local political structures, including the djemaa (council) to which he could appoint members. He equipped at his own expense a deira of five hundred horsemen who became the nucleus of his army. He then patrolled the neighborhood chastising rebels, restoring peace and levying tax. Sheikh Soliman came to terms with the Douaouda feudal family, who commanded the “Riah”—nomadic tribes controlling the plain from the Zibans to Ouargla, by marrying his daughter to the head of this family, Ben Sakheri, who bore the title of sheikh el Arab.

As early as the sixteenth century, the Sultanate of Tuggurt had to face the hegemony of the regency of Algiers. Salah Raïs, beylerbey of Algiers, led an expedition against Tuggurt in 1552. The Ben Djellab surrendered in the face of enemy artillery; politically they became vassals of Algiers and paid it tribute.

== List of rulers ==
The known Sultans (and one female ruler) were:

- Ali II (N/A)
- Mabruk (Mubarak) (N/A)
- Ali III (N/A)
- Mustafa (N/A)
- Sulayman III (N/A)
- Ahmad II (1729-N/A)
- Muhammad I al-`Akhal (N/A)
- Ahmad IV (N/A)
- Farhat (N/A)
- Ibrahim (N/A)
- Abd al-Qadir I (1st time) + Ahmad V (N/A)
- Khalid (N/A)
- Abd al-Qadir I (2nd time) (N/A)
- Umar bin Bu-Kumetin (175.-1759)
- Muhammad II (1759–1765)
- Umar II bin Muhammad (1765–1766)
- Ahmad VI (1766–1778)
- Abd al-Qadir II (1778–1782)
- Farhat II (1782–1792)
- Ibrahim II (1792–1804)
- al-Khazan (1804)
- Muhammad III (1804–1822)
- `Amar (`Amir) II (1822–1830)
- Ibrahim III (1830–1831)
- `Ali IV bin al-Kabir (1831–1833)
- `Aisha (Aichouch) (female) (1833–1840)
- `Abd ar-Rahman (1840–1852)
- `Abd al-Qadir III (1852)
- Sulayman IV (1852–1854) (last)

== See also ==
- List of Sunni Muslim dynasties
- History of Algeria
