= Zaouia El Abidia =

Zaouia El Abidia اﻟﺰاوﻳﺔ اﻟﻌﺎﺑﺪﻳﺔ
- Commune and town

- Location within Algeria
- Coordinates: 33°8′15″N 6°4′56″E
- Country: Algeria
- Province: Touggourt Province
- District: Touggourt District
- Elevation: 66 m (217 ft)

Population (2008)
  - Total: 19,993
- Time zone: UTC+1 (CET)

Zaouia El Abidia (Arabic: اﻟﺰاوﻳﺔ اﻟﻌﺎﺑﺪﻳﺔ) is a town and commune in Touggourt District, Touggourt Province, Algeria. According to the 2008 census it has a population of 19,993, up from 15,381 in 1998, and has an annual population growth rate of 2.7%. It forms the northern part of the urban area of Touggourt.

== Localities ==
The commune is composed of only one locality:

- Quartier de Zaouia El Abidia
