= Sidi Slimane, Touggourt =

Sidi Slimane ﺳﻴﺪي ﺳﻠﻴﻤﺎن
- Commune and town

- Location within Algeria
- Coordinates: 33°17′19″N 6°5′41″E
- Country: Algeria
- Province: Touggourt Province
- District: Mégarine District

Area
  - Total: 635 km^{2} (245 sq mi)
- Elevation: 61 m (200 ft)

Population (2008)
  - Total: 8,072
  - Density: 12.7/km^{2} (32.9/sq mi)
- Time zone: UTC+1 (CET)
- Postal codes: 30031, 30032, 30033, 30034, 30035, 30036

Sidi Slimane (Arabic: ﺳﻴﺪي ﺳﻠﻴﻤﺎن) is a town and commune in Mégarine District, Touggourt Province, Algeria, located near the city of Touggourt. According to the 2008 census it has a population of 8,072, up from 6,822 in 1998, and an annual growth rate of 1.7%.

== Geography ==
Sidi Slimane lies in a large area of palm plantations on an oasis network that extends from here past Touggourt through to Balidat Ameur. Beyond the oases is the arid and barren landscape of the Sahara, featuring areas of sand dunes (ergs) and flat rocky plains (regs).

== Climate ==
Sidi Slimane has a hot desert climate (Köppen climate classification BWh), with very hot summers and mild winters. Rainfall is light and sporadic, and summers are particularly dry.

== Transportation ==
Sidi Slimane is connected to the N3 national highway by the regional road W305, which is 5 kilometres (3.1 mi) long. From the intersection, the town is connected to Biskra to the north, and Touggourt to the south. The train line from Biskra to Touggourt also runs past the town at the locality of Moggar, but there is no station.

== Education ==
4.4% of the population has a tertiary education, and another 14.8% has completed secondary education. The overall literacy rate is 80.7%, and is 87.0% among males and 74.4% among females.

== Localities ==
The commune is composed of three localities:

- Sidi Slimane
- Moggar
- El Har Ihira
