= Nezla =

Nezla ﻧﺰﻟﺔ
- Commune and town

- Location within Algeria
- Coordinates: 33°5′0″N 6°3′5″E
- Country: Algeria
- Province: Touggourt Province
- District: Touggourt District
- Established: 1984

Area
  - Total: 132.15 km^{2} (51.02 sq mi)
- Elevation: 68 m (223 ft)

Population (2008)
  - Total: 51,674
  - Density: 391.03/km^{2} (1,012.8/sq mi)
- Time zone: UTC+1 (CET)

Nezla (Arabic: ﻧﺰﻟﺔ) is a town and commune in Touggourt District, Touggourt Province, Algeria. According to the 2008 census it has a population of 51,674, up from 40,524 in 1998, and an annual population growth rate of 2.5%. Nezla is part of the urban area of Touggourt, and forms much of the southern area of that city. Agriculture is the main industry of the region, along with some tourism. The Sidi Madhi Airport is found in Nezla commune, and serves Touggourt and the surrounding areas.

== Localities ==
The commune is composed of five localities:

- Nezla
- Boumerdès
- Sidi Boudjenane
- Aïn Sahra
- Sidi Madhi
