= El Guerara District =

- District
- Map of Algeria highlighting Ghardaïa Province
- Coordinates: 32°47′25″N 4°29′32″E
- Country: Algeria
- Province: Ghardaïa Province
- District seat: El Guerrara
- Time zone: UTC+1 (CET)

El Guerara District is a district of Ghardaïa Province, Algeria. It was named after its capital, El Guerrara.

== Municipalities ==
The district consists of only one municipality, El Guerrara.
