= Tamacine =

Tamacine ﺗﻤﺎﺳﻴﻦ
- Commune and town
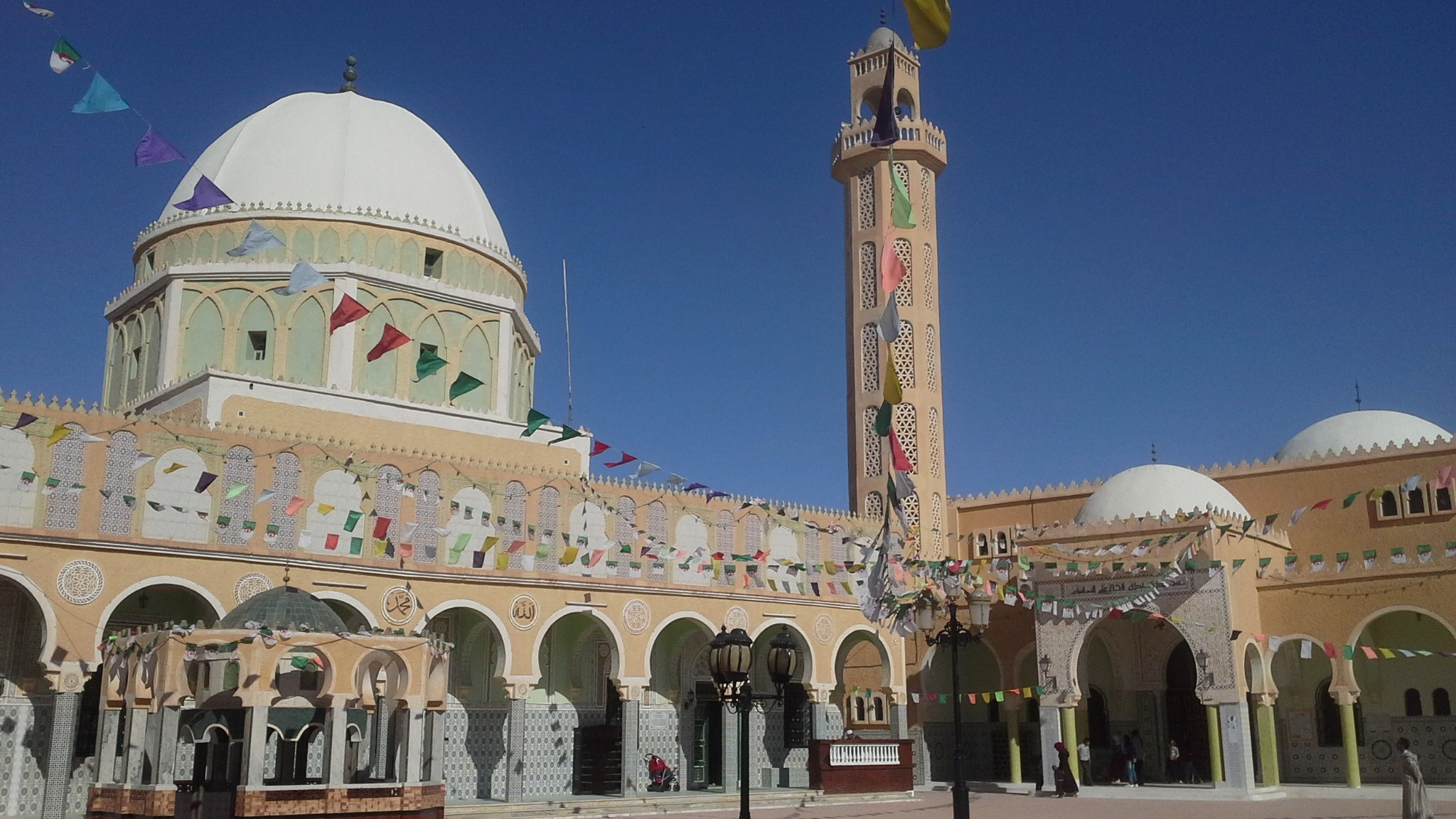
- Zaouia Tidjania, Tamacine

- Location within Algeria
- Coordinates: 33°1′19″N 6°1′22″E
- Country: Algeria
- Province: Touggourt Province
- District: Témacine District
- Established: 1984

Area
  - Total: 300 km^{2} (120 sq mi)
- Elevation: 82 m (269 ft)

Population (2008)
  - Total: 20,067
  - Density: 67/km^{2} (170/sq mi)
- Time zone: UTC+1 (CET)

Tamacine (Arabic: ﺗﻤﺎﺳﻴﻦ) (sometimes written Témacine) is a town and commune, and capital of Témacine District, in Touggourt Province, Algeria. According to the 2008 census it has a population of 20,067, up from 15,933 in 1998, and an annual growth rate of 2.4%. It is around 10 kilometres (6.2 mi) south of Touggourt. The Tugurt language is spoken by some residents of Tamacine.

== History ==
The mosque in the town of Témacine, the Mosque of Si al-Hajj, dates to 1431.

== Geography ==
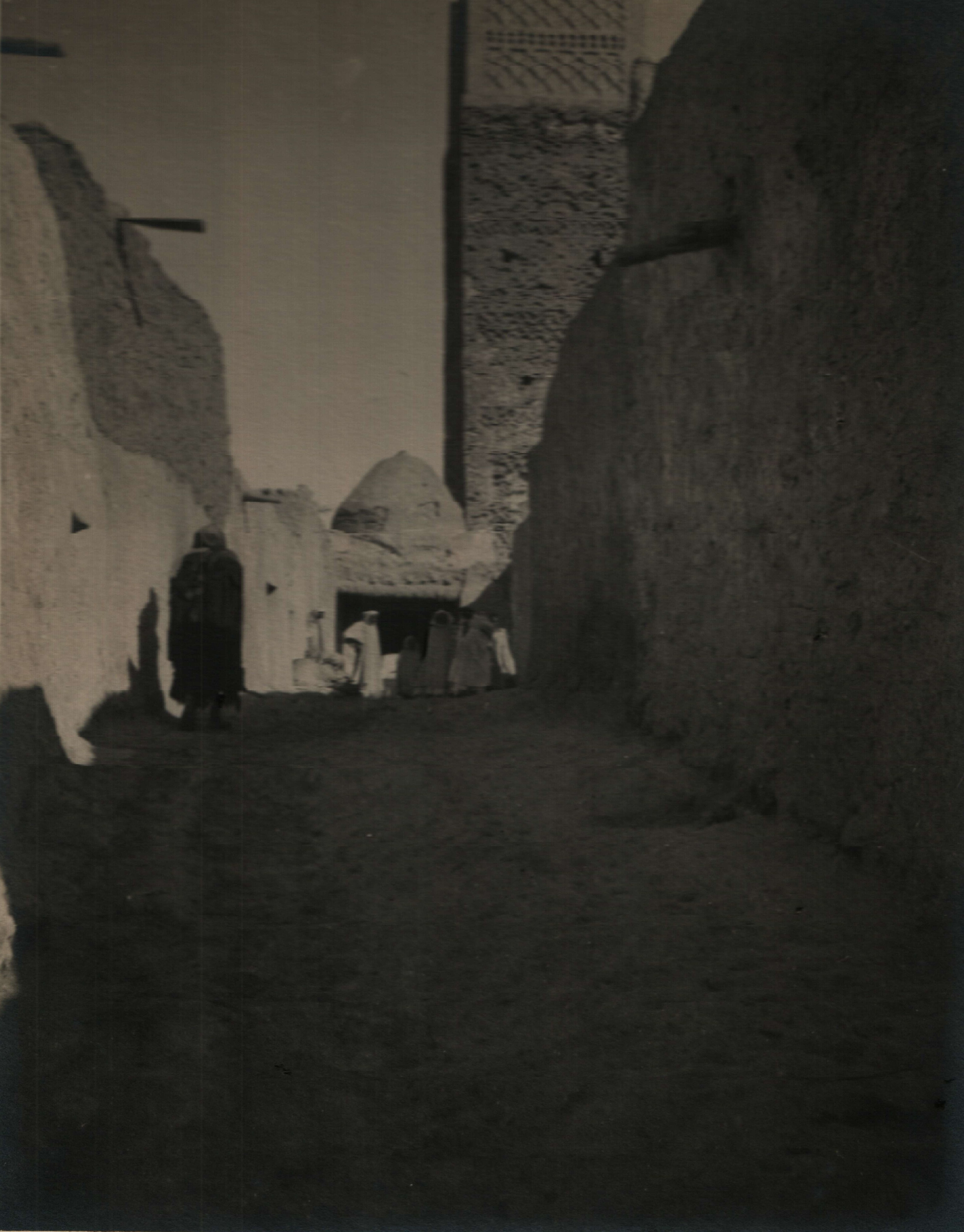
Great Mosque Street in January 1913

Tamacine lies at an elevation of 82 metres (269 ft) within the system of oases near Touggourt. These oases feature extensive palm groves and other agriculture. Beyond this is the arid and barren landscape of the Sahara, featuring areas of sand dunes (ergs) and flat rocky plains (regs). Lake Tamacine, a small lake covering 2 hectares (4.9 acres) and 402 metres (440 yd) long, lies along the eastern side of the town, and is notable for its variety of birds and fish.

== Climate ==
Tamacine, like other towns in the Saharan region, has a hot desert climate with very hot summers and mild winters, and very little precipitation.

== Economy ==
The most significant sector in Tamacine's economy is agriculture, in particular the farming of date palms; over 200,000 palms are planted across the commune. Other fruit trees are also cultivated, including olives, figs, apricots, pomegranates, apples, grapes and plums. Livestock reared in the commune are mainly goats and sheep.

Tamacine also has various traditional industries, such as pottery, jewellery, textile industries including embroidery and knitting, and blacksmithing.

Tourism is another important industry for Tamacine. The most notable attractions include Lake Tamacine, as well as the various mosques and palaces in the town.

== Infrastructure ==
Drinking water is available to 99% of the population, and access to the sewerage network is available to 95%.

== Health ==
Tamacine has two municipal health clinics, a private health clinic, and several pharmacies.

== Education ==
Tamacine's educational facilities include 8 municipal elementary schools, a vocational training center, apprenticeships, and an educational center for mentally handicapped children. 8.3% of the population has a tertiary education, and another 20.9% has completed secondary education. The overall literacy rate is 83.4%, and is 88.5% among males and 78.5% among females.

== Transportation ==
Tamacine is connected by local roads to Touggourt to the north and the N3 national highway to the west. From Touggourt, major highways lead north to Biskra, east to El Oued, and south to Ouargla and Illizi. The town is served by the Sidi Madhi Airport near Touggourt.

The road network of Tamacine covers 300 kilometres (190 mi).

== Localities ==
The commune is composed of five localities:

- Temacine
- El Behour
- Sidi Ameur
- El Ksour
- Tamellaht

== Gallery ==
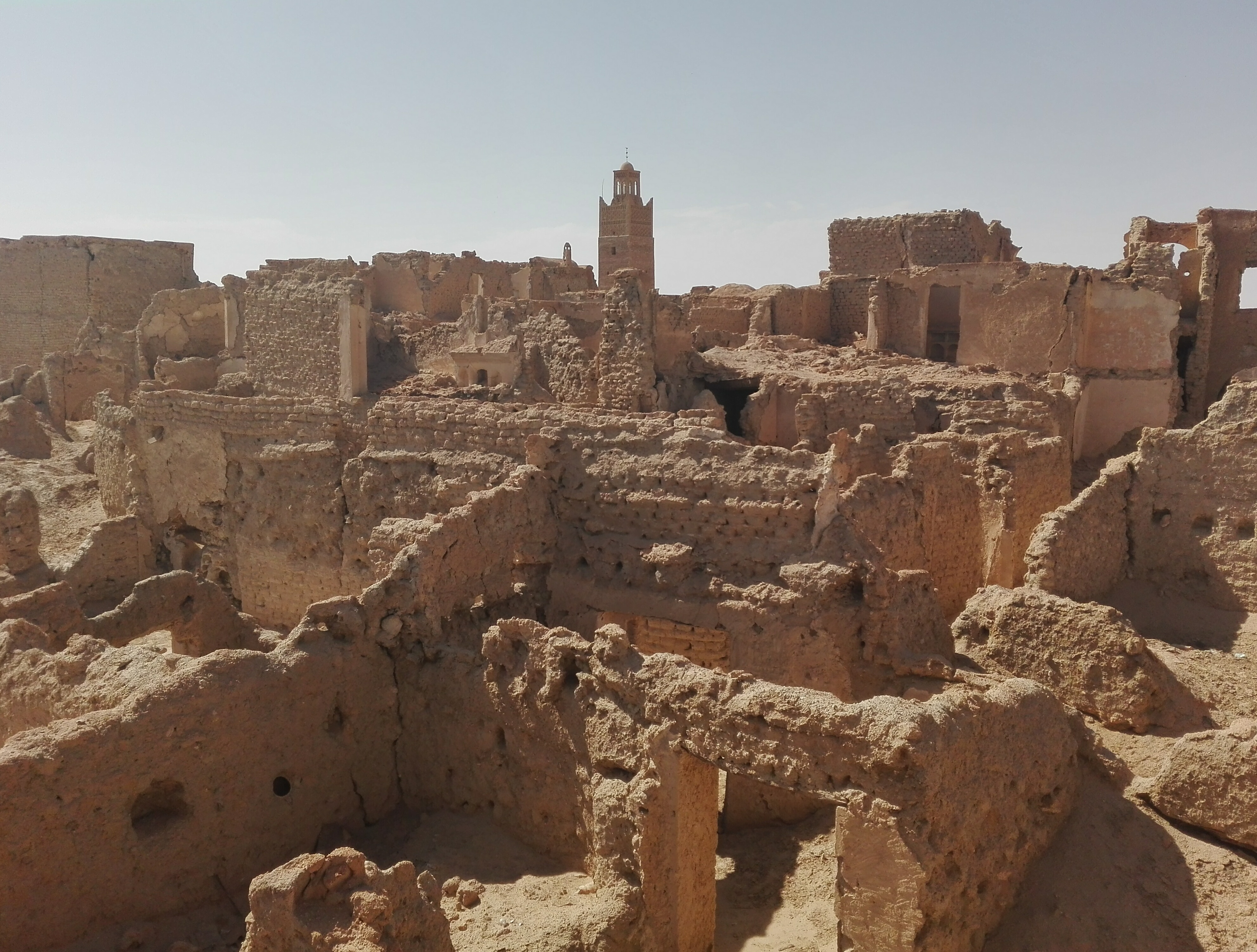

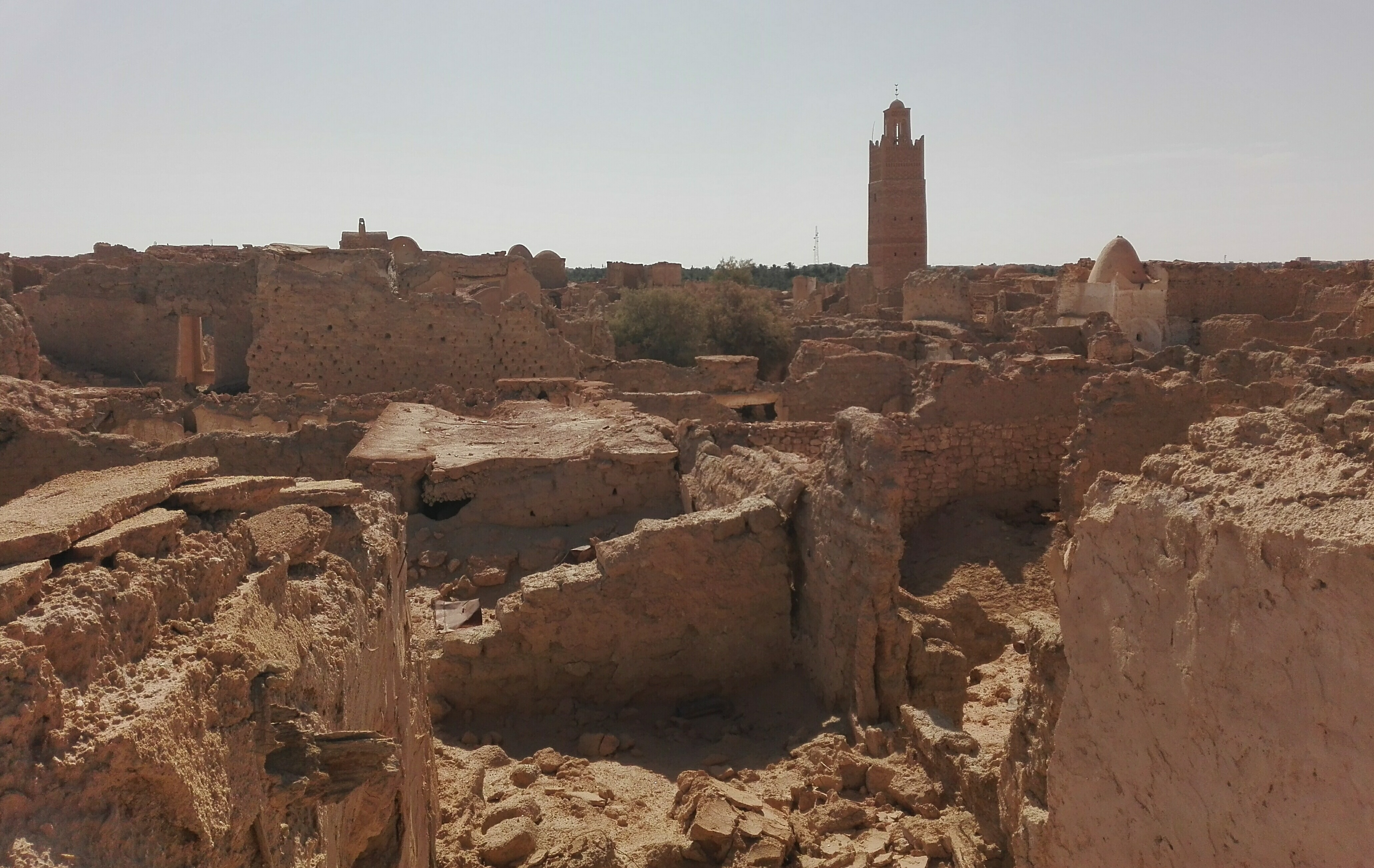

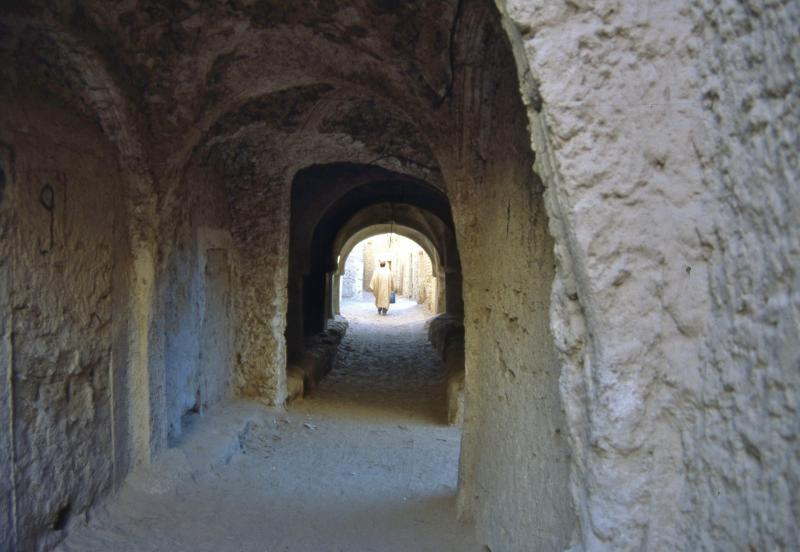

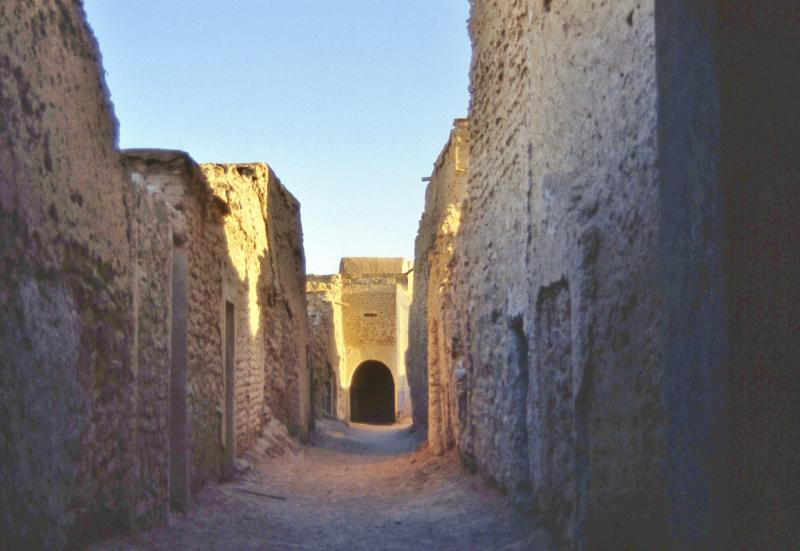
