= Taïbet District =

Coordinates: 33°05′N 6°23′E

Taïbet District دائرة الطيبات
- District
- Map of Algeria highlighting Touggourt Province

- Map of Ouargla Province highlighting Taïbet District
- Country: Algeria
- Province: Touggourt Province
- District seat: Taïbet

Area
  - Total: 15,554 km^{2} (6,005 sq mi)

Population (2008)
  - Total: 44,683
  - Density: 2.8728/km^{2} (7.4404/sq mi)
- Time zone: UTC+01 (CET)
- Communes: 3

Taïbet is a district in Touggourt Province, Algeria. It was named after its capital, Taibet. As of the 2008 census, the district had a total population of 44,683.

== Communes ==
The district is further divided into 3 communes:

- Taibet
- Benaceur
- M'Naguer
