= El Hadjira District =

Coordinates: 32°37′N 5°31′E

El Hadjira District دائرة الحجيرة
- District
- Map of Algeria highlighting Ouargla Province

- Map of Ouargla Province highlighting El Hadjira District
- Country: Algeria
- Province: Ouargla
- District seat: El Hadjira

Area
  - Total: 9,048 km^{2} (3,493 sq mi)

Population (1998)
  - Total: 19,311
  - Density: 2.134/km^{2} (5.528/sq mi)
- Time zone: UTC+01 (CET)
- Communes: 2

El Hadjira is a district in Ouargla Province, Algeria. It was named after its capital, El Hadjira. As of the 2008 census, the district had a total population of 22,474.

== Communes ==
The district is further divided into 2 communes:

- El Hadjira
- El Allia
