= El Guerrara =

El Guerrara القرارة
- Commune and town
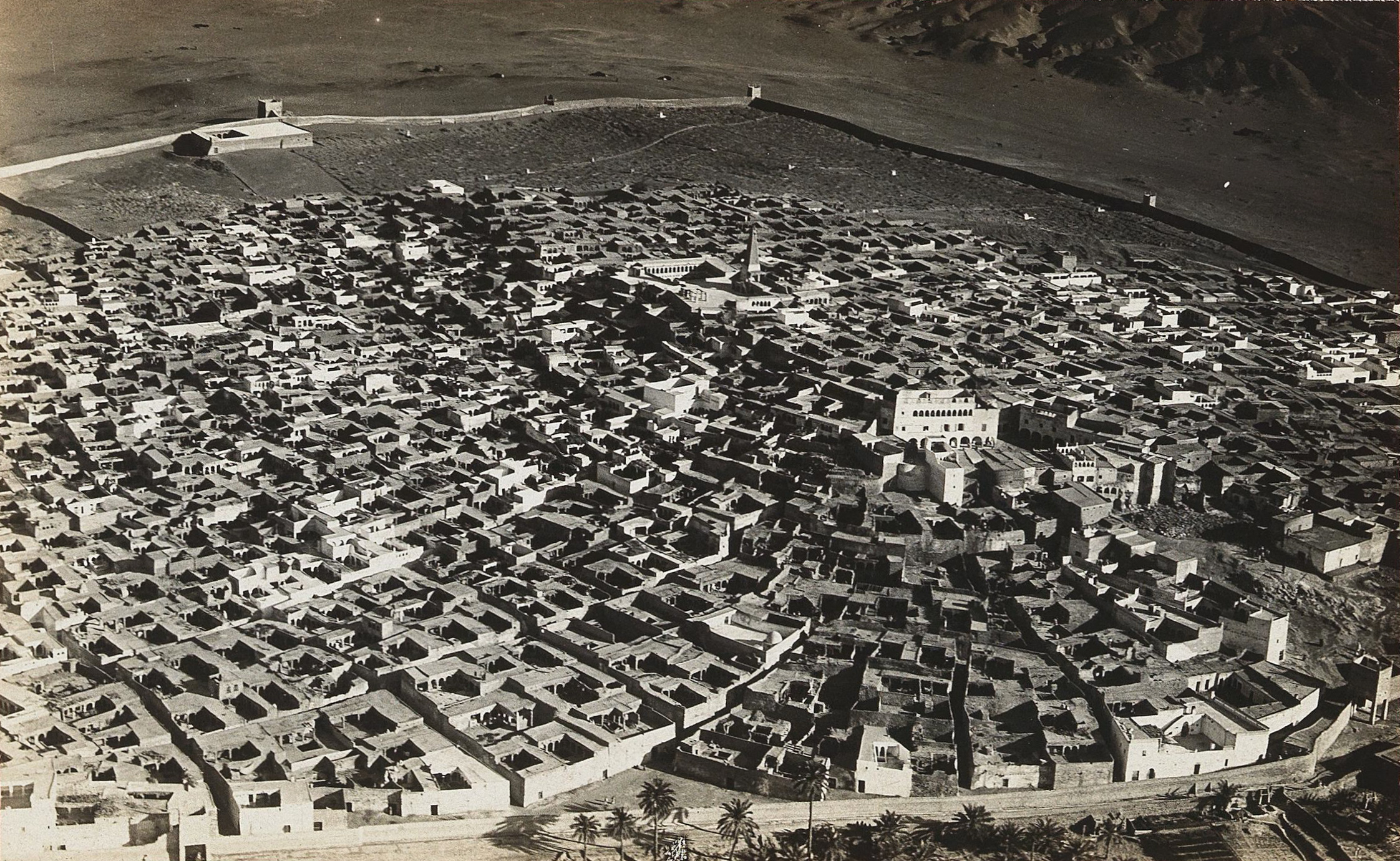
- Aerial view of the city in 1917

- Location of El Guerrara commune within Ghardaïa Province

- Location of El Guerrara within Algeria
- Coordinates: 32°47′25″N 4°29′32″E
- Country: Algeria
- Province: Ghardaïa Province
- District: El Guerrara District (coextensive)
- Elevation: 310 m (1,020 ft)

Population (2008)
  - Total: 59,514
- Time zone: UTC+1 (CET)

El Guerrara (Arabic: القرارة) (also written al-Qarārah or Guerara) is a town and commune, coextensive with El Guerrara District, in Ghardaïa Province, Algeria. According to the 2008 census it has a population of 59,514, up from 48,313 in 1998, with an annual growth rate of 2.1%.

== Geography ==
=== Climate ===
El Guerrara has a hot desert climate (Köppen climate classification BWh), with very hot summers and mild winters, and very little precipitation throughout the year.

Climate data for Berriane
Month	Jan	Feb	Mar	Apr	May	Jun	Jul	Aug	Sep	Oct	Nov	Dec	Year
Mean daily maximum °C (°F)	16.4 (61.5)	19.1 (66.4)	22.4 (72.3)	27.8 (82.0)	32.4 (90.3)	37.9 (100.2)	42.2 (108.0)	40.9 (105.6)	35.0 (95.0)	27.9 (82.2)	21.2 (70.2)	17.1 (62.8)	28.4 (83.0)
Daily mean °C (°F)	10.3 (50.5)	12.6 (54.7)	15.5 (59.9)	20.1 (68.2)	24.6 (76.3)	29.8 (85.6)	33.5 (92.3)	32.4 (90.3)	27.9 (82.2)	21.2 (70.2)	15.0 (59.0)	11.1 (52.0)	21.2 (70.1)
Mean daily minimum °C (°F)	4.2 (39.6)	6.1 (43.0)	8.7 (47.7)	12.5 (54.5)	16.8 (62.2)	21.8 (71.2)	24.8 (76.6)	24.0 (75.2)	20.9 (69.6)	14.5 (58.1)	8.8 (47.8)	5.1 (41.2)	14.0 (57.2)
Average precipitation mm (inches)	8 (0.3)	5 (0.2)	9 (0.4)	6 (0.2)	5 (0.2)	2 (0.1)	1 (0.0)	2 (0.1)	6 (0.2)	7 (0.3)	9 (0.4)	8 (0.3)	68 (2.7)
Source: climate-data.org

== Transportation ==
El Guerrara is on the W33, a regional road between Berriane on the N1 to the west, and the N3 about halfway between Touggourt and Ouargla to the east.

== Education ==
40% of the population has a tertiary education (the equal highest in the province), and another 80% has completed secondary education. The overall literacy rate is 5%, and is 1% among males and 4% among females.

== Localities ==
The commune of El Guerrara is composed of three localities:

- Vieux Ksar de El Guerrara
- Quartiers périphériques
- Palmeraie et village socialiste agricole
