= Touggourt District =

Touggourt District دائرة تقرت
- District
- Map of Algeria highlighting Touggourt Province

- Map of Ouargla Province highlighting Touggourt District
- Coordinates: 33°6′N 6°4′E
- Country: Algeria
- Province: Touggourt Province
- District seat: Touggourt

Area
  - Total: 404 km^{2} (156 sq mi)

Population (2008)
  - Total: 146,108
  - Density: 362/km^{2} (937/sq mi)
- Time zone: UTC+01 (CET)
- Communes: 4

Touggourt is a district in Touggourt Province, Algeria. It was named after its capital, Touggourt. It is the smallest, the most populated, and most densely populated district in the province. As of the 2008 census, the district had a population of 146,108.

== Municipalities ==
The district is further divided into 4 communes:

- Touggourt
- Nezla
- Tebesbest
- Zaouia El Abidia
