= Balidat Ameur =

Balidat Ameur ﺑﻠﻴﺪة ﻋﺎﻣﺮ
- Commune and town
- Location of Balidat Ameur commune within Ouargla Province

- Location of Balidat Ameur within Algeria
- Coordinates: 32°57′5″N 5°58′50″E
- Country: Algeria
- Province: Touggourt Province
- District: Témacine District
- Established: 1984

Area
  - Total: 6,589 km^{2} (2,544 sq mi)
- Elevation: 92 m (302 ft)

Population (2008)
  - Total: 14,540
  - Density: 2.207/km^{2} (5.715/sq mi)
- Time zone: UTC+1 (CET)

Balidat Ameur (Arabic: ﺑﻠﻴﺪة ﻋﺎﻣﺮ) (sometimes written Blidet Amor) is a town and commune in Touggourt Province, Algeria, located near the provincial capital of Ouargla. According to the 2008 census it has a population of 14,540, up from 12,135 in 1998, and a population growth rate of 1.9%. The commune is made of two areas, the main town of Balidat Ameur, and the village of Goug 7 kilometres (4.3 mi) to the southeast.

== Geography ==
Balidat Ameur is surrounded by palm plantations that mostly lie in the valleys of the oasis. Apart from in the oasis itself, the nearby land is flat and barren.

== Climate ==
Balidat Ameur has a hot desert climate (Köppen climate classification BWh), with very hot summers and mild winters. Rainfall is light and sporadic, and summers are particularly dry.

== Transportation ==
Balidat Ameur lies a short distance from the N3 national highway between Touggourt to the north and Hassi Messaoud to the south. The town is 140 kilometres (87 mi) from the provincial capital Ouargla, which can be reached by the N56 that turns off the N3 to the south. A local road leads north to the nearby town and district capital of Témacine.

== Economy ==
Balidat Ameur's economy is centered on the farming of date palms, but also features other agricultural crops such as olives, pomegranates, tree grapes, apples and plums. Animals farmed are mainly goats, sheep and camels.

Clay is an important natural resource and contributes towards the buildings and pottery of the region. Other industries include knitting, weaving, and blacksmithing.

== Education ==
The town has eight elementary schools. 5.4% of the population has a tertiary education, and another 16.2% has completed secondary education. The overall literacy rate is 79.0%, and is 87.4% among males and 71.1% among females.

== Localities ==
The commune is composed of two localities:

- Balidet Ameur
- Goug
