= Lalla Aicha, regent of Touggourt =

Regent of Touggourt (from 1833 to 1846)

Lalla Aicha للا عائشة

Regent of the Touggourt State
- Regency: 1833–1846
- Died: Touggourt
- Spouse: Sultan of Touggourt
- Children: Abd ar-Rahman
Names
- Lalla Aicha
- House: Ben-Gana
- Religion: Islam

Lalla Aicha (Arabic: للا عائشة) (known as Aichouche) (Arabic: عيشوش) was regent of Touggourt during the minority of her son Abd ar-Rahman from 1833–1846. She was from the Ben-Gana family, which was granted the title ‘cheikh el-Arab’ by the French.

== Life ==
Some sources claim she married Amer, Sultan of Touggourt (1822–1830), while others state she was the wife of Ibrahim III, Sultan of Touggourt (r. 1830–1831). Lalla Aicha was the mother of Sultan Abd ar-Rahman (r. 1840–1852).

Aicha's husband Sultan Ibrahim was murdered by his brother Ali, who usurped power in 1831. Consequently, Aicha and a faction of courtiers rebelled against her brother-in-law Sultan Ali (Sulayman's father) and maintained power by killing other potential rivals, including Sulayman's infant son.

Aicha ordered Ali poisoned which occurred, before taking power in the name of her son Abd er-Rahman, then aged eight. Assuming the title khalifa (viceroy) she took over the direction of government, managing state affairs with great ability. Accounts say that she rode a horse, wore pistols on her belt and even smoked tekrouri (hemp). She governed the state on her own until her son was old enough to take over.

According to an 1854 account by Sulayman IV, last of the Beni Djellab sultans, the period of Lalla Aicha's rule was characterised by extreme violence within the ruling family, although this was not entirely unusual.
