= Taibet =

Taibet اﻟﻄﻴﺒﺎت
- Commune and town
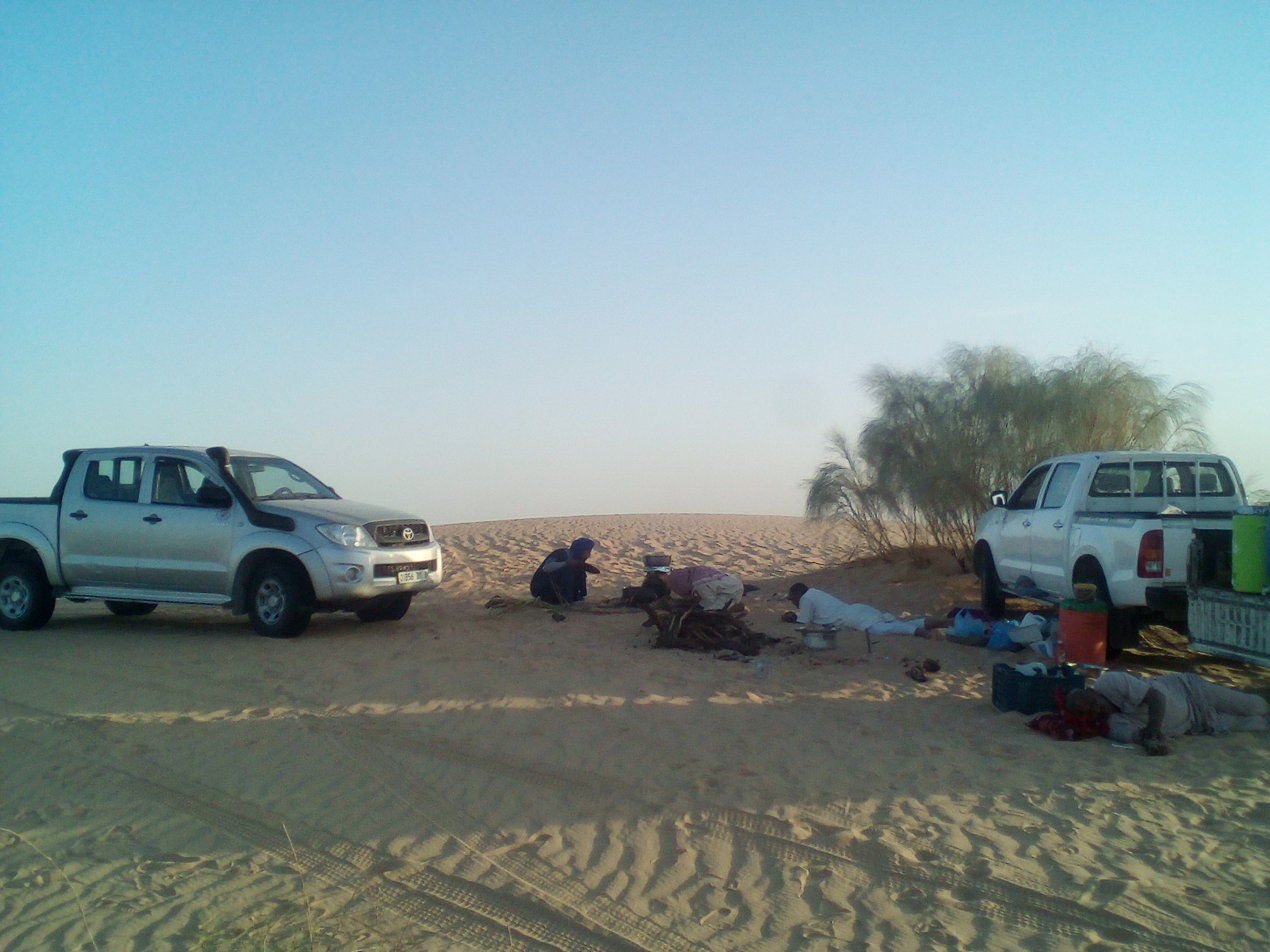
- Journey into the Sahara near Taibet

- Location within Algeria
- Coordinates: 33°5′N 6°23′E
- Country: Algeria
- Province: Touggourt Province
- District: Taibet District
- Elevation: 99 m (325 ft)

Population (2008)
  - Total: 20,174
- Time zone: UTC+1 (CET)

Taibet is a town and commune, and the capital of Taibet District, in Touggourt Province, Algeria. According to the 2008 census it has a population of 20,174, up from 14,322 in 1998, and a growth rate of 3.6%.

== Geography ==
Taibet lies at an elevation of 99 metres (325 ft) surrounded by the palm trees of its oasis, one of many scattered oases lying between Touggourt and El Oued. Beyond the oasis are the sand dunes of the Grand Erg Oriental desert.

== Climate ==
Taibet has a hot desert climate (Köppen climate classification BWh), with very hot summers and mild winters, and very little precipitation throughout the year.

Climate data for Taibet
Month	Jan	Feb	Mar	Apr	May	Jun	Jul	Aug	Sep	Oct	Nov	Dec	Year
Mean daily maximum °C (°F)	16.8 (62.2)	19.4 (66.9)	23.4 (74.1)	28.2 (82.8)	32.9 (91.2)	37.8 (100.0)	41.7 (107.1)	40.6 (105.1)	36.2 (97.2)	29.0 (84.2)	22.2 (72.0)	17.1 (62.8)	28.8 (83.8)
Daily mean °C (°F)	10.2 (50.4)	12.6 (54.7)	16.2 (61.2)	20.6 (69.1)	25.3 (77.5)	30.3 (86.5)	33.4 (92.1)	32.4 (90.3)	28.8 (83.8)	22.1 (71.8)	15.7 (60.3)	10.8 (51.4)	21.5 (70.8)
Mean daily minimum °C (°F)	3.6 (38.5)	5.8 (42.4)	9.1 (48.4)	13.1 (55.6)	17.7 (63.9)	22.9 (73.2)	25.1 (77.2)	24.3 (75.7)	21.4 (70.5)	15.3 (59.5)	9.2 (48.6)	4.6 (40.3)	14.3 (57.8)
Average precipitation mm (inches)	10 (0.4)	5 (0.2)	8 (0.3)	5 (0.2)	5 (0.2)	2 (0.1)	0 (0)	1 (0.0)	4 (0.2)	6 (0.2)	9 (0.4)	10 (0.4)	65 (2.6)
Source: climate-data.org

== Transportation ==
Taibet is connected by short local roads to the N16, which connects the town to Touggourt 35 kilometres (22 mi) to the west and El Oued 60 kilometres (37 mi) to the northeast.

== Education ==
4.0% of the population has a tertiary education, and another 11.5% has completed secondary education. The overall literacy rate is 63.1% (second lowest in the province), and is 75.9% among males and 50.4% among females (also the second lowest in the province).

== Localities ==
The commune is composed of 17 localities:

- Taïbet
- حي المناصرية
- Taïbet El Gueblia
- Bahdi
- Oumih Chargui
- Oumih Lemcif
- El Khoubna I
- El Khoubna II
- Matmat
- Hassi Ouled Zid
- Amiche
- Ouglet Mabrouka
- El Bania Malah Saada
- Retmia
- Dlila
- Bakar
- Djouini
