= Mégarine District =

Coordinates: 33°11′43″N 6°05′19″E

Mégarine District دائرة مقارين
- District
- Map of Algeria highlighting Touggourt Province

- Map of Ouargla Province highlighting Mégarine District
- Country: Algeria
- Province: Touggourt Province
- District seat: Mégarine

Area
  - Total: 920 km^{2} (360 sq mi)

Population (2008)
  - Total: 21,823
  - Density: 24/km^{2} (61/sq mi)
- Time zone: UTC+01 (CET)
- Communes: 2

Mégarine is a district in Touggourt Province, Algeria. It was named after its capital, Mégarine. As of the 2008 census, the district had a total population of 21,823.

== Municipalities ==
The district is further divided into 2 communes:

- Mégarine
- Sidi Slimane
