= Témacine District =

Coordinates: 33°01′19″N 6°01′22″E

Témacine District دائرة تماسين
- District
- Map of Algeria highlighting Touggourt Province

- Map of Ouargla Province highlighting Témacine District
- Country: Algeria
- Province: Touggourt Province
- District seat: Témacine

Area
  - Total: 550 km^{2} (210 sq mi)

Population (2008)
  - Total: 34,607
  - Density: 63/km^{2} (160/sq mi)
- Time zone: UTC+01 (CET)
- Communes: 2

Témacine is a district in Touggourt Province, Algeria. It was named after its capital, Témacine. It is one of the smallest districts in the province. As of the 2008 census, the district had a population of 34,607.

== Municipalities ==
The district is further divided into two communes:

- Témacine
- Balidat Ameur
