= Touggourt Province =

Province of Algeria

Touggourt Province ولاية تقرت
- Province
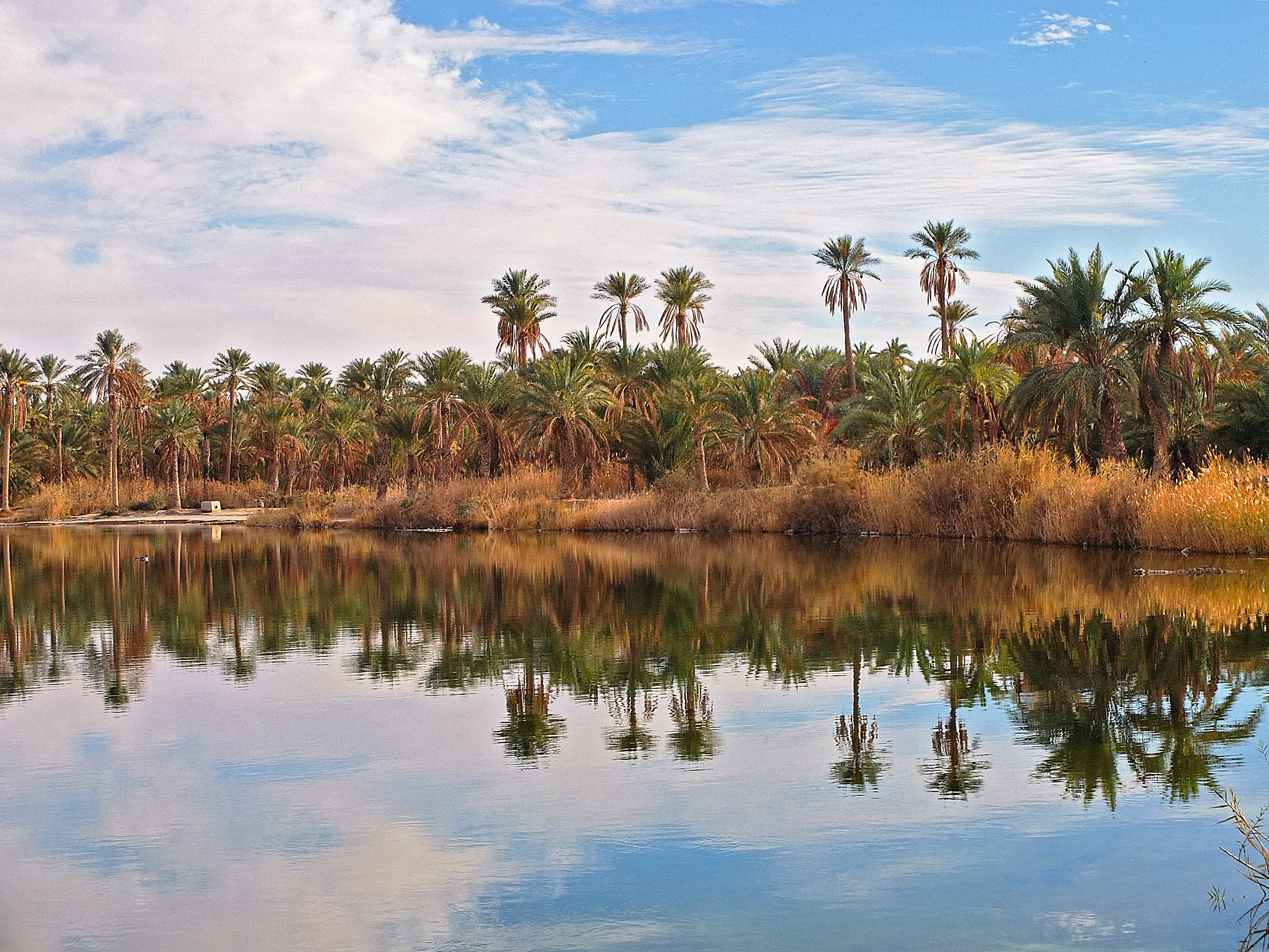
- Lake Tamacine in Touggourt Province.

- Map of Algeria highlighting Touggourt
- Coordinates: 33°06′30″N 6°03′50″E
- Country: Algeria
- Capital: Touggourt

Area
  - Total: 17,428 km^{2} (6,729 sq mi)
- Elevation: 276 m (906 ft)

Population (2008)
  - Total: 247,221
  - Density: 14.185/km^{2} (36.740/sq mi)
- Time zone: UTC+01 (CET)
- Area code: +213 (0) 55
- ISO 3166 code: DZ-01
- Districts: 4
- Municipalities: 11

Touggourt (Arabic: ولاية تقرت) is an Algerian province (wilaya) created in 2019, previously, a delegated wilaya created in 2015. It is in the Algerian Sahara.

== Geography ==
Touggourt Province is located in the Algerian Sahara and has an area of 17,428 km². Its main settlement and capital, Touggourt, is located on an oasis.

It is delimited by:

- to the north by the El M'Ghair Province, ouled Djellal Province;
- to the east by the El Oued Province;
- to the west by the Djelfa Province, Ghardaia Province;
- and to the south by the Ouargla Province, Illizi Province .

== History ==
The wilaya of Touggourt was created on November 26, 2019.

Previously, it was a delegated wilaya, created according to the law n° 15–140 of May 27, 2015, creating administrative districts in certain wilayas and fixing the specific rules related to them, as well as the list of municipalities that are attached to it. Before 2019, it was attached to the Ouargla Province.

== Organization of the wilaya ==
During the administrative breakdown of 2019, the delegated wilaya of Touggourt is made up of 5 districts and 13 communes.

=== List of subdivisions ===
District	Commune	Arabic	Map
Mégarine District	Megarine	اﻟﻤﻘﺎرﻳﻦ	
Mégarine District	Sidi Slimane	ﺳﻴﺪي ﺳﻠﻴﻤﺎن	
Taïbet District	Benaceur	ﺑﻦ ﻧﺎﺻﺮ	
Taïbet District	M'Naguer	اﻟﻤﻨﻘﺮ	
Taïbet District	Taibet	اﻟﻄﻴﺒﺎت	
Témacine District	Balidat Ameur	ﺑﻠﻴﺪة ﻋﺎﻣﺮ	
Témacine District	Tamacine	ﺗﻤﺎﺳﻴﻦ	
Touggourt District	Nezla	ﻧﺰﻟﺔ	
Touggourt District	Tebesbest	ﺗﻴﺒسﺴﺖ	
Touggourt District	Touggourt	تقرت	
Touggourt District	Zaouia El Abidia	اﻟﺰاوﻳﺔ اﻟﻌﺎﺑﺪﻳﺔ	
El Hadjira District	El Hadjira	الحجيرة	
El Hadjira District	El Allia	العالية	
