= Djamaa =

Djamaa Mohammed Mehdi ﺟﻣﻌﺔ
- Commune and town
- Location of Djamaa commune within El M'Ghair Province

- Location of Djamaa within Algeria
- Coordinates: 33°32′N 6°0′E
- Country: Algeria
- Province: El M'Ghair Province
- District: Djamaa District
- Elevation: 41 m (135 ft)

Population (2008)
  - Total: 50,916
- Time zone: UTC+1 (CET)

Djamaa (Arabic: ﺟﺎﻣﻌﺔ) (also written Jama'a) is a town and commune in El M'Ghair Province, Algeria. According to the 2008 census it has a population of 50,916, up from 37,438 in 1998, with an annual growth rate of 3.1%.

== Geography ==
To the east of Djamaa is a large area of palm plantations. The locality of Tigdidine lies amongst the palm trees. To the west the landscape is mostly arid and sandy, although there is another smaller palm plantation about 3 kilometres (1.9 mi) west of the town.

== Climate ==
Djamaa has a hot desert climate (Köppen climate classification BWh), with very hot summers and mild winters, and very little precipitation throughout the year.

Climate data for Djamaa
Month	Jan	Feb	Mar	Apr	May	Jun	Jul	Aug	Sep	Oct	Nov	Dec	Year
Mean daily maximum °C (°F)	16.8 (62.2)	19.4 (66.9)	23.4 (74.1)	28.0 (82.4)	33.0 (91.4)	37.9 (100.2)	41.5 (106.7)	40.8 (105.4)	35.7 (96.3)	28.9 (84.0)	21.9 (71.4)	17.4 (63.3)	28.7 (83.7)
Daily mean °C (°F)	10.5 (50.9)	12.9 (55.2)	16.5 (61.7)	20.6 (69.1)	25.4 (77.7)	30.5 (86.9)	33.5 (92.3)	32.9 (91.2)	28.6 (83.5)	22.3 (72.1)	15.6 (60.1)	11.4 (52.5)	21.7 (71.1)
Mean daily minimum °C (°F)	4.2 (39.6)	6.4 (43.5)	9.6 (49.3)	13.2 (55.8)	17.9 (64.2)	23.2 (73.8)	25.5 (77.9)	25.1 (77.2)	21.6 (70.9)	15.7 (60.3)	9.4 (48.9)	5.4 (41.7)	14.8 (58.6)
Average precipitation mm (inches)	8 (0.3)	4 (0.2)	12 (0.5)	8 (0.3)	5 (0.2)	1 (0.0)	0 (0)	1 (0.0)	6 (0.2)	10 (0.4)	10 (0.4)	11 (0.4)	76 (2.9)
Source: climate-data.org

== Transportation ==
Djamaa has a station on the Biskra-Touggourt railway line. The N3 highway passes through the town, also connecting Biskra in the north to Touggourt in the south.

== Education ==
6.5% of the population has a tertiary education, and another 16.1% has completed secondary education. The overall literacy rate is 80.7%, and is 86.3% among males and 75.2% among females.

== Localities ==
The commune of Djamaa is composed of five localities:

- Djamaa
- Tigdidine
- Ourglana
- Sidi Yahia
- Mazer Zaouia

== See also ==
- Djema'a
