= Djamaâ District =

- District
- Location of Djamaâ District in El M'Ghair Province
- Coordinates: 33°32′N 6°0′E
- Country: Algeria
- Province: El M'Ghair Province
- Capital: Djamaa

Population (2008)
  - Total: 89,880
- Time zone: UTC+1 (CET)

Djamaâ District is a district of El M'Ghair Province, Algeria. As of the 2008 census, it has a population of 89,880.

== Communes ==
Djamaâ District consists of four communes:

- Djamaa
- M'Rara
- Sidi Amrane
- Tendla
