= El M'Ghair Province =

Province of Algeria

El M'Ghair Province ولاية المغير
- Province
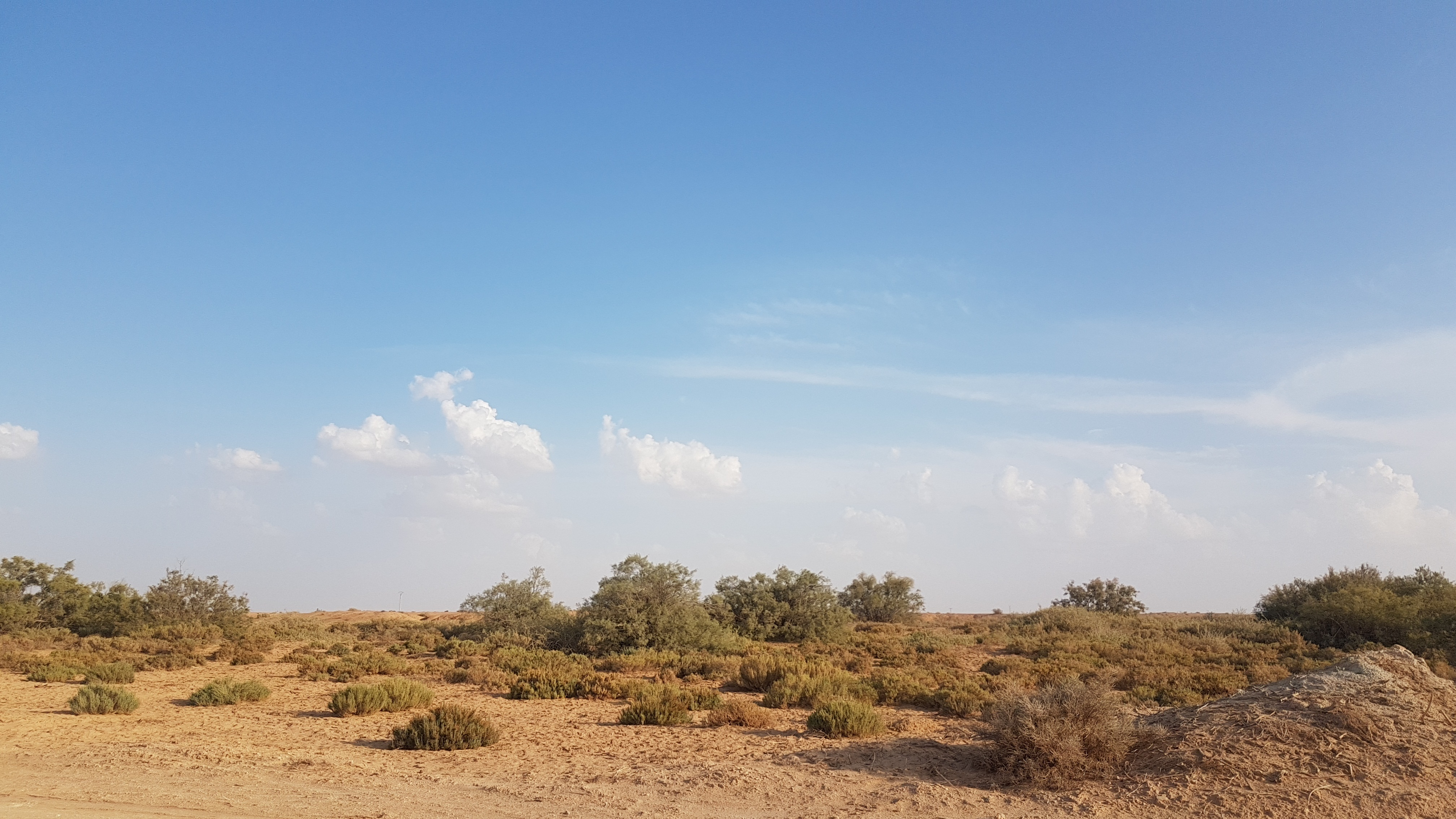
- The desert in El M'Ghair

- Map of Algeria highlighting El M'Ghair
- Coordinates: 33°56′50″N 5°55′20″E
- Country: Algeria
- Capital: El M'Ghair

Area
  - Total: 8,835 km^{2} (3,411 sq mi)
- Elevation: 276 m (906 ft)

Population (2008)
  - Total: 162,267
  - Density: 18.37/km^{2} (47.57/sq mi)
- Time zone: UTC+01 (CET)
- Area code: +213 (0) 49
- ISO 3166 code: DZ-57
- Districts: 2
- Municipalities: 8

The wilaya of El M'Ghair (Arabic: ولاية المغير) is an Algerian province created in 2019, previously, a delegated wilaya created in 2015. It is in the Algerian Sahara. It received four titles when it was founded, so it was called Riyad Enakhil since 1848 after the fall of the resistance of Ahmed Bey in the eastern region of Algeria, and the migration of Arabs Bani Salim and Banu Hillal to it and its reconstruction, where Ahmed Bey resided there for three days after the fall of his resistance. It was called Petit Ziban when it belonged to the wilaya of Biskra, because it consists of reefs, steppes and valleys, in addition to small low mountains, and the jewel of Oued Righ because it mediates the Righ region between Biskra and Touggourt. It was also called the Oasis of Springs due to the abundance of various water springs in its palm oases, and the first spring was emitted in 1845.

== Geography ==
The wilaya of El M'Ghair is in the Algerian Sahara. Its area is 8,835 km^{2}.

It is delimited by:

- to the north by the Biskra Province;
- to the east by the El Oued Province and Touggourt Province;
- to the west by the Ouled Djellal Province;
- and to the south by the Ouargla Province and Touggourt Province.

== History ==
The wilaya of El M'Ghair was created on November 26, 2019.

Previously, it was a delegated wilaya, created according to the law n° 15–140 of May 27, 2015, creating administrative districts in certain wilayas and fixing the specific rules related to them, as well as the list of municipalities that are attached to it. Before 2019, it was attached to the El Oued Province.

== Administrative divisions ==
The province is divided into 2 districts (daïras), which are further divided into 8 communes or municipalities.

=== Districts ===
1. El M'Ghair
2. Djamaâ

=== Communes ===
1. El M'Ghair
2. Oum Touyour
3. Sidi Khellil
4. Still
5. Djamaa
6. M'Rara
7. Sidi Amrane
8. Tendla

=== List of walis ===
- El M'Ghair
- Djamaâ

== See also ==
- History of Algerian local authorities
