= Touggourt =

Touggourt Arabic: تقرت Berber languages: ⵜⵓⴳⵓⵔⵜ
- City
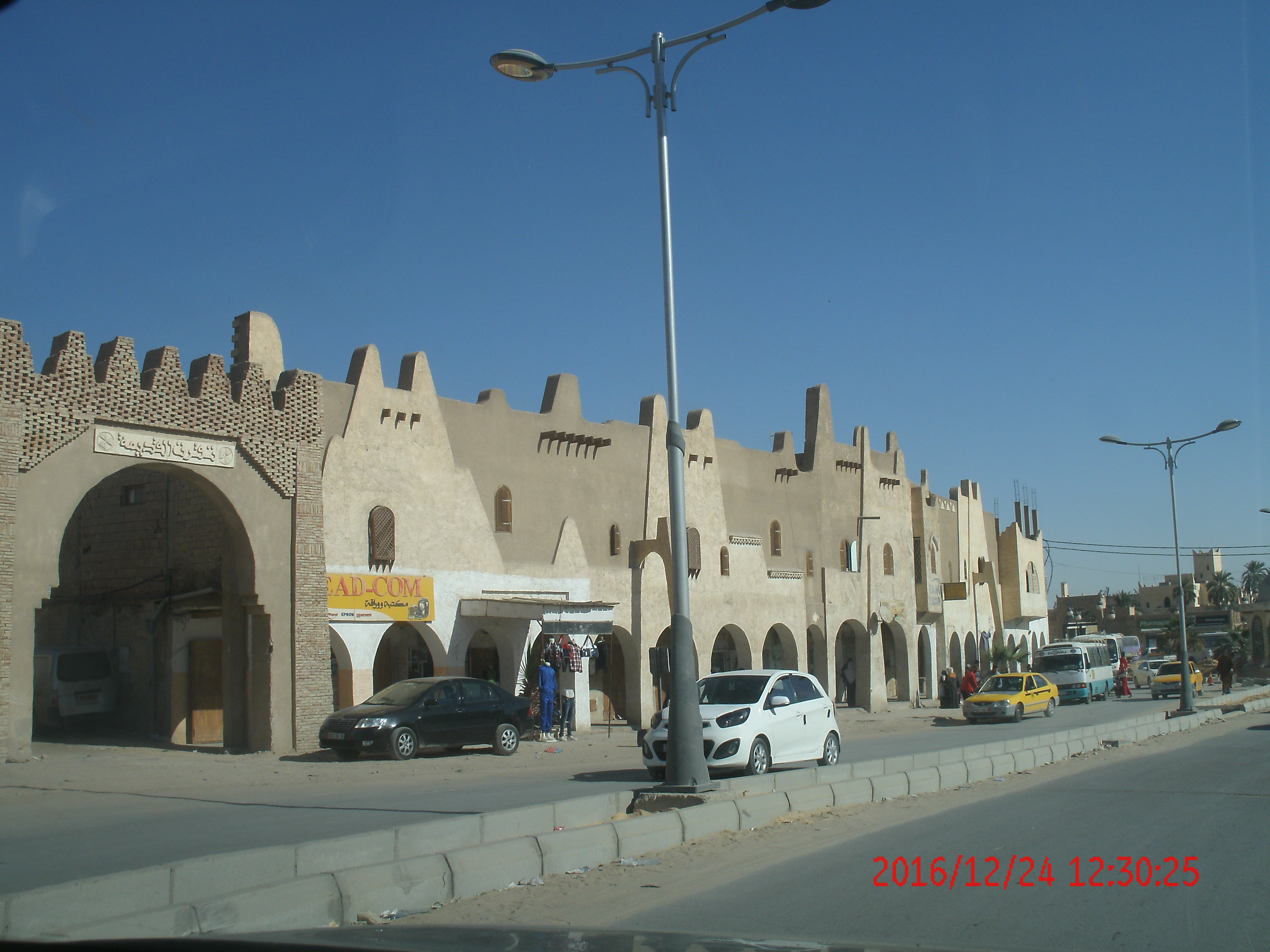
- Entrance to the Ksar of Touggourt

- Location of Touggourt commune within Ouargla Province

- Location of Touggourt within Algeria
- Coordinates: 33°06′N 6°04′E
- Country: Algeria
- Province: Touggourt
- District: Touggourt

Area
  - Total: 216 km^{2} (83 sq mi)
- Elevation: 62 m (203 ft)

Population (2008)
  - Total: 143,270
  - Density: 663/km^{2} (1,720/sq mi)
- Time zone: UTC+1 (CET)
- Postal code: 30002

Touggourt (Arabic: ﺗﻗﺮت or تڤرت from Berber languages: ⵜⵓⴳⵓⵔⵜ, romanized: Tugurt, lit. 'the gateway' or 'the gate') is a city and commune, former sultanate and capital of Touggourt District, in Touggourt Province, Algeria, built next to an oasis in the Sahara. As of the 2008 census, the commune had a population of 39,409 people, up from 32,940 in 1998, and an annual growth rate of 1.8%. Touggourt's urban area includes the communes of Nezla, Tebesbest and Zaouia El Abidia, for a total population of 146,108.

Touggourt is notable for its date trees. It was formerly surrounded by a moat, which the French filled up. Bradt Travel Guides describe it as "largely a modern town of block architecture" and "largely unattractive. The centre is quiet most of the day due to the heat but is more active at night when people take to the streets."

== History ==
Timeline of Touggourt
Historical affiliations

Sultanate of Tunis pre 1414
Sultanate of Tuggurt 1414–1552
Sultanate of Tuggurt, (tributary of the Ottoman Empire) 1552–1830
Sultanate of Tuggurt 1830–1844
France, (French Algeria) 1844–1871
Mokrani Revolt 1871–1872
France, (French Algeria) 1871-1962
Algeria 1962–present

In 1414 the Sultanate of Tuggert was founded in southern Algeria. The known Sultans (and one female ruler) were:

- Ali II
- Mabruk (Mubarak)
- Ali III
- Mustafa
- Sulayman III
- 1729 Ahmad II
- Muhammad I al-‘Akhal
- Ahmad IV
- Farhat
- Ibrahim
- Abd al-Qadir I (1st time) + Ahmad V
- Khalid
- Abd al-Qadir I (2nd time)
- Umar bin Bu-Kumetin
- 1756 Muhammad II
- Umar II bin Muhammad
- Ahmad VI
- Abd al-Qadir II
- Farhat II
- 1792 Ibrahim II
- 1804 al-Khazan
- 1804 Muhammad III
- 1822 ‘Amar (‘Amir) II
- 1830 Ibrahim III
- 1831 ‘Ali IV bin al-Kabir
- 1833 ‘Aisha (Aichouch) (female)
- 1840 ‘Abd ar-Rahman
- 1852 ‘Abd al-Qadir III
- 1852 - 1854 Sulayman IV

The Tuggurt Expedition (1552) is also a notable historical event.

In 1854 the sultanate was abolished by French colonial authorities in Algeria.

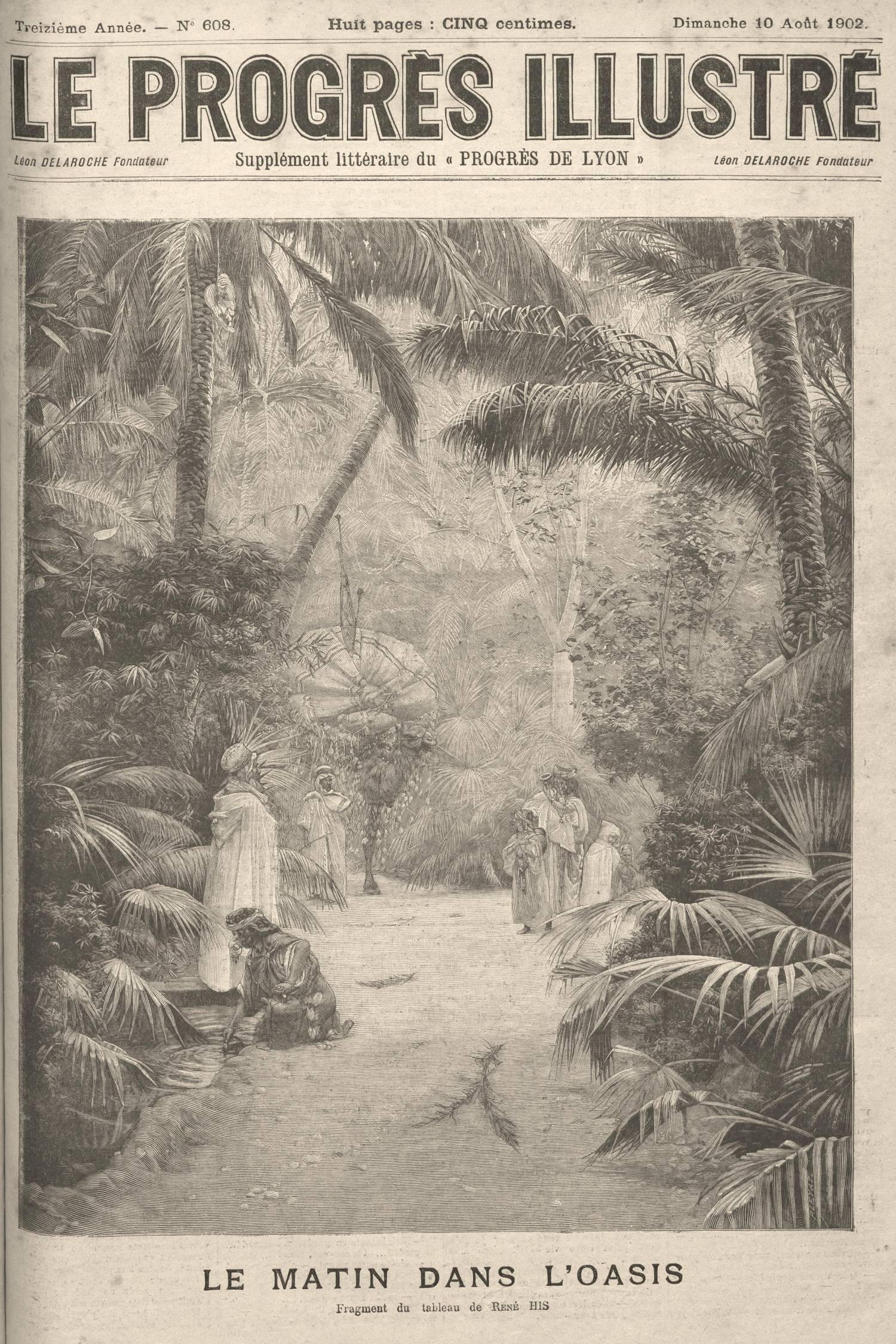
Matin dans l'Oasis, Tougourth (“Morning in the Oasis, Tougourth”)

Touggourt, as it is now spelled, became one of the initial six (1902), then four (1905) autonomous administrative districts of the Territoires du Sud (Southern Territories), which in 1957 were first joined, then reorganized into two regular French départements. Tuggert became part of Oasis (prefecture seat Ouargla).

== Etymology ==
The name is derived from the Berber Word 'Taggurt' meaning gate or door due to its location on a road north to the coast and south to the dessert.

== Geography ==
Touggourt lies on the western side of an extensive system of oases which supports palm plantations and other agriculture in an area 50 kilometres (31 mi) from north to south. Other towns around the oases are Sidi Slimane and Megarine to north, and Tamacine and Balidat Ameur to the south. The system is also associated with more oases further north in El Oued Province including the towns of Djamaa and El M'Ghair. Beyond the oases, the land is arid and barren, with extensive sand dunes both to the west and east of the city.

== Climate ==
Touggourt has a hot desert climate (Köppen climate classification BWh), with long, extremely hot summers and short, warm winters. Average high temperatures are consistently over 40 °C (104 °F) during June, July, August and September and reach a maximum of nearly 45 °C (113 °F) in July. Average low temperatures in summer are also very high, above 26 °C (82.4 °F) and routinely above 29 °C (86 °F) in the hottest month. Average annual rainfall is around 55 mm (2,16 in) and summers are especially dry. On 30 July 2023, a maximum temperature of 50.3 °C (122.5 °F) was registered in Touggourt.

Climate data for Touggourt (1991–2020)
Month	Jan	Feb	Mar	Apr	May	Jun	Jul	Aug	Sep	Oct	Nov	Dec	Year
Record high °C (°F)	26.4 (79.5)	35.4 (95.7)	39.8 (103.6)	41.0 (105.8)	45.6 (114.1)	50.2 (122.4)	50.3 (122.5)	49.0 (120.2)	46.2 (115.2)	40.7 (105.3)	34.9 (94.8)	28.6 (83.5)	50.3 (122.5)
Mean daily maximum °C (°F)	17.5 (63.5)	19.7 (67.5)	23.9 (75.0)	28.3 (82.9)	33.5 (92.3)	38.5 (101.3)	41.8 (107.2)	41.0 (105.8)	35.8 (96.4)	—	22.9 (73.2)	18.3 (64.9)	—
Daily mean °C (°F)	11.0 (51.8)	12.9 (55.2)	17.0 (62.6)	21.3 (70.3)	26.3 (79.3)	31.2 (88.2)	34.3 (93.7)	33.7 (92.7)	29.2 (84.6)	—	16.4 (61.5)	12.0 (53.6)	—
Mean daily minimum °C (°F)	4.5 (40.1)	6.1 (43.0)	10.2 (50.4)	14.2 (57.6)	19.1 (66.4)	23.9 (75.0)	26.7 (80.1)	26.4 (79.5)	22.5 (72.5)	—	9.9 (49.8)	5.6 (42.1)	—
Record low °C (°F)	−1.8 (28.8)	−1.6 (29.1)	0.6 (33.1)	4.2 (39.6)	9.2 (48.6)	13.4 (56.1)	19.0 (66.2)	18.4 (65.1)	11.8 (53.2)	7.4 (45.3)	−1.8 (28.8)	−1.8 (28.8)	−1.8 (28.8)
Average precipitation mm (inches)	12.3 (0.48)	4.3 (0.17)	7.0 (0.28)	6.9 (0.27)	3.3 (0.13)	0.7 (0.03)	0.5 (0.02)	2.3 (0.09)	7.1 (0.28)	4.5 (0.18)	6.3 (0.25)	5.0 (0.20)	60.2 (2.37)
Average precipitation days (≥ 1 mm)	1.3	0.8	1.5	0.9	0.8	0.3	0.0	0.6	1.7	0.7	1.2	1.1	10.9
Mean monthly sunshine hours	244.8	243.2	268.0	—	322.0	—	359.4	338.5	275.1	—	243.9	235.6	—
Source: NOAA

== Transportation ==
Touggourt lies at the junction of the N3 and N16 roads, 161 kilometres (100 mi) northeast of the provincial capital of Ouargla. It is connected by railway to Biskra and is served by the Sidi Madhi Airport.

The N3 highway connects to Megarine, Sidi Slimane, and Biskra to the north and Hassi Messaoud and Illizi to the south. The N16 connects to Taibet and El Oued to the east. Another road, the Route Messaad Tougourt, connects to Messaâd and Djelfa to the northwest. Local roads connect to nearby towns Megarine and Tamacine.

== Localities ==
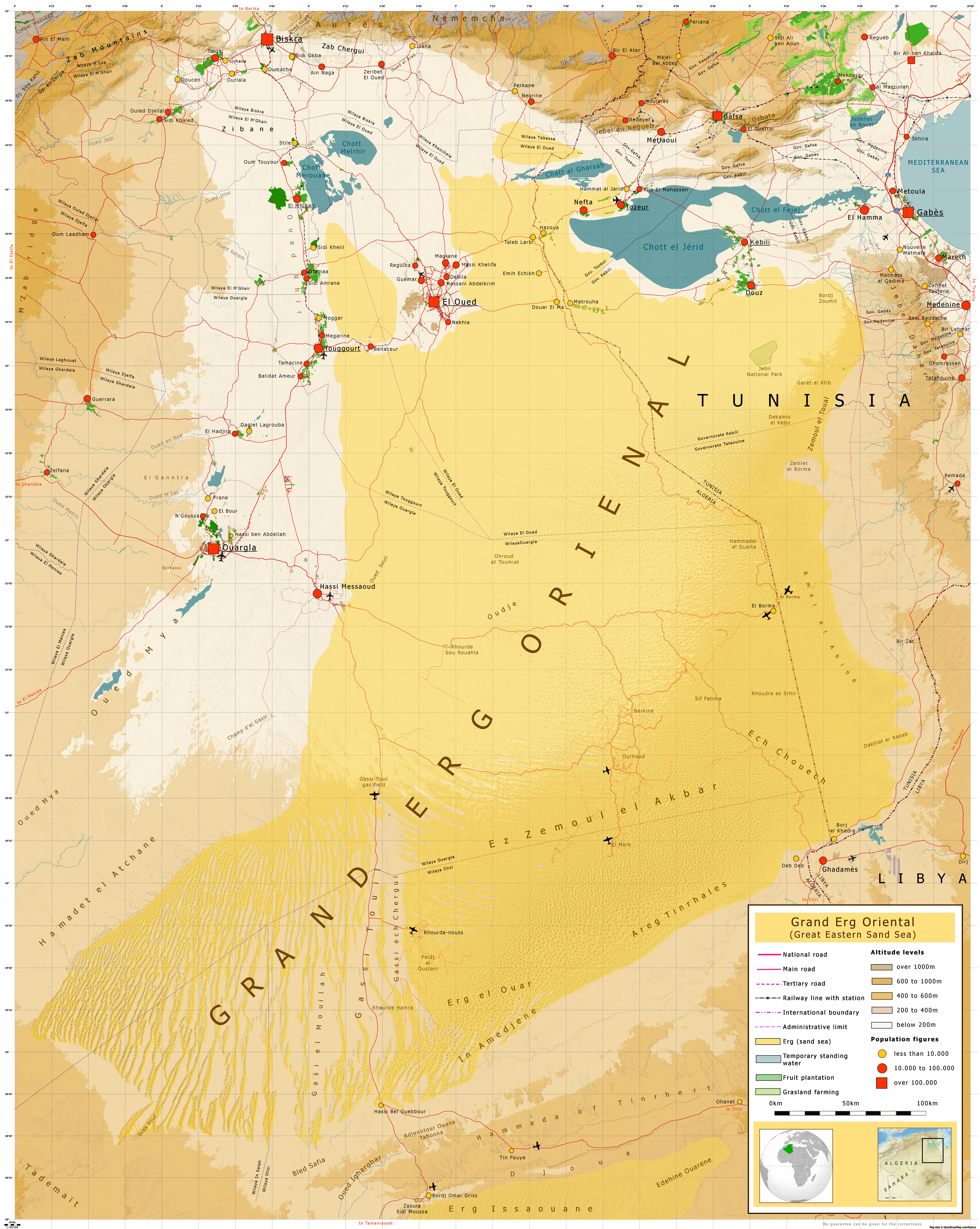
Grand Erg Oriental with Touggourt between Ouargla and El Oued

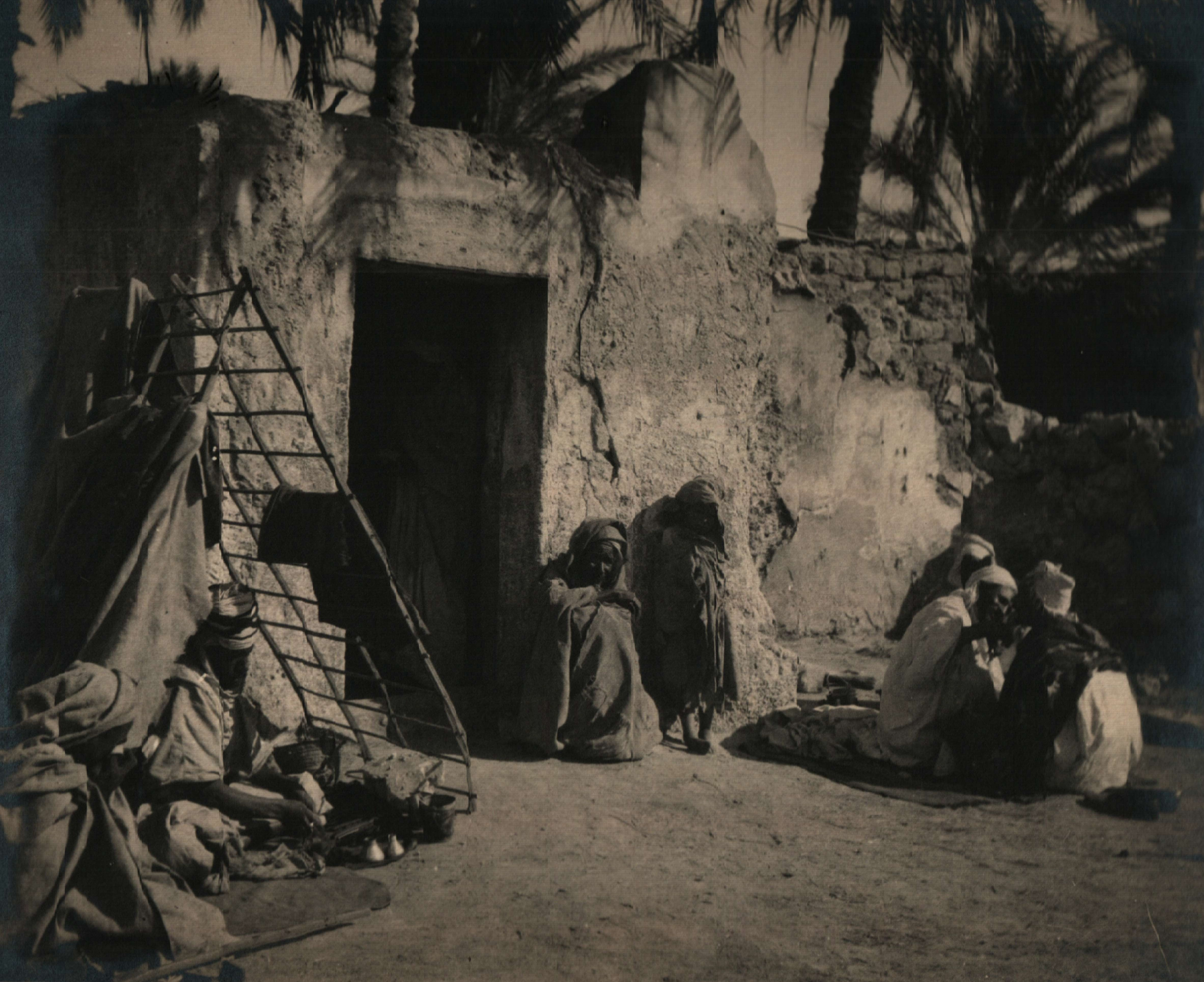
Touggourt in January 1913

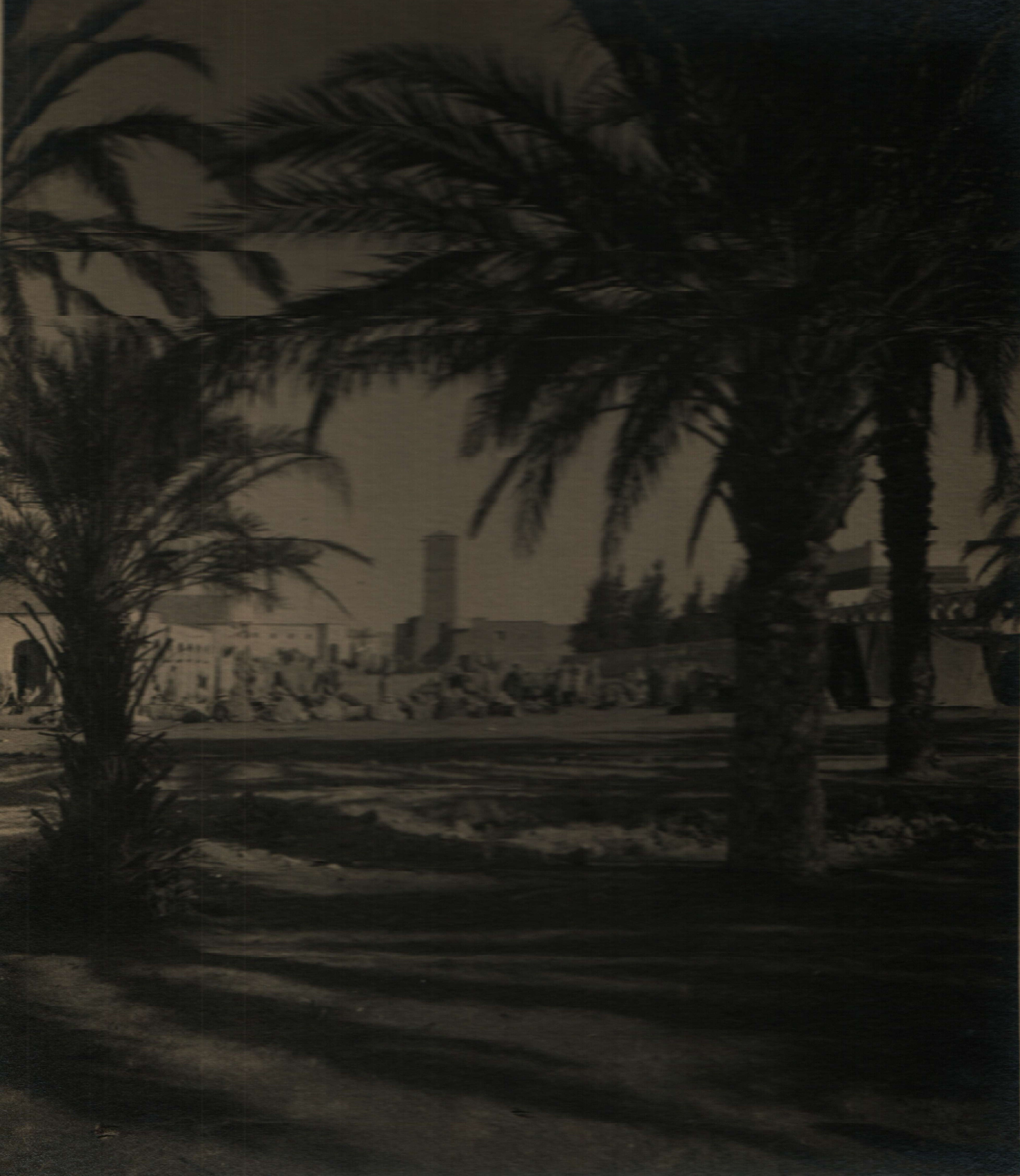
Touggourt in January 1913

The commune is composed of nine localities:

- Quartier de Mestaoua
- Sidi Abdessalem
- Baalouche
- Chateau d'eau
- Emir Abdelkader
- La gare
- Sidi Bouaziz
- Zone Industrielle
- Nouvelle Zone d'Activité

== Notable residents ==
- Abla Kemari, human rights activist.

== Sources and external links ==
- WorldStatesmen - Algeria - Tuggert
Neighbouring towns and cities
