= Hassani Abdelkrim =

Hassani Abdelkrim حساني ﻋﺒﺪ اﻟﻜﺮﻳﻢ
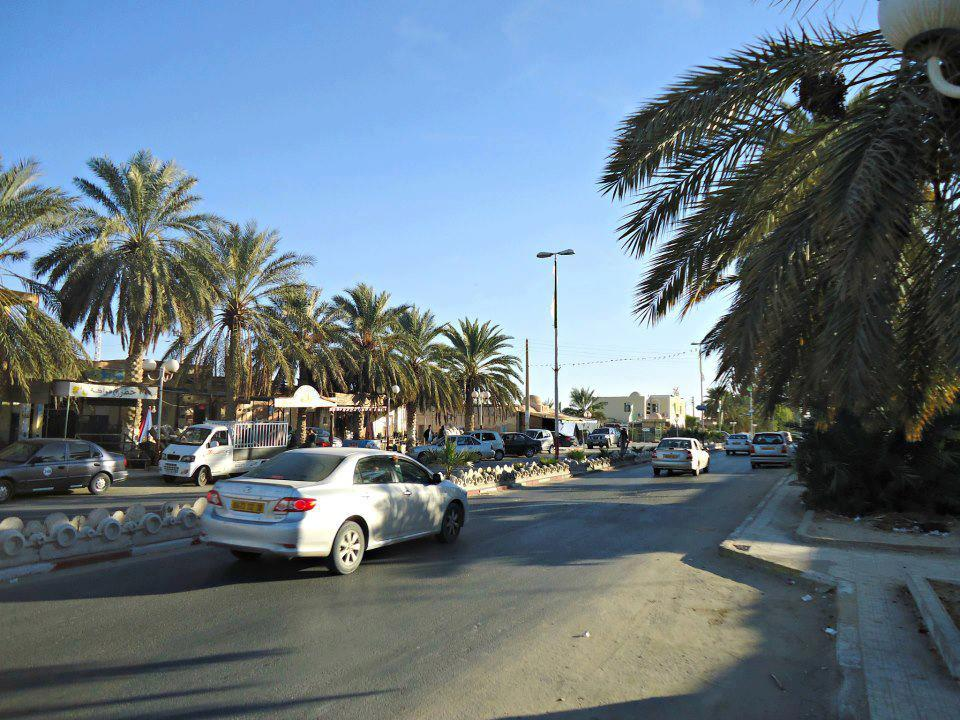

- Location of Hassani Abdelkrim commune within El Oued Province

- Location of Hassani Abdelkrim within Algeria
- Coordinates: 33°28′38″N 6°53′42″E
- Country: Algeria
- Province: El Oued Province
- District: Debila District

Government
  - Mayor: Kamel Souid
- Elevation: 62 m (203 ft)

Population (2008)
  - Total: 22,755
  - Density: 392/km^{2} (1,020/sq mi)
- Time zone: UTC+1 (WAT)
- Postal code: 39029

Hassani Abdelkrim (Arabic: حساني ﻋﺒﺪ اﻟﻜﺮﻳﻢ) is a town and commune in Debila District, El Oued Province, Algeria. According to the 2008 census it has a population of 22,755, up from 17,207 in 1998, with a population growth rate of 2.9%.

== Geography ==
=== Bordering communes ===
Hassani Abdelkrim commune is bordered to the north by Sidi Aoun, to the northeast by Debila, to the east and southeast by Trifaoui, to the south by El Oued, to the southwest by Kouinine, to the west by Taghzout, and to the northwest by Guemar.

Communes bordering Hassani Abdelkrim

== Climate ==
Hassani Abdelkrim has a hot desert climate (Köppen climate classification BWh), with very hot summers and mild winters. Rainfall is light and sporadic, and summers are particularly dry.

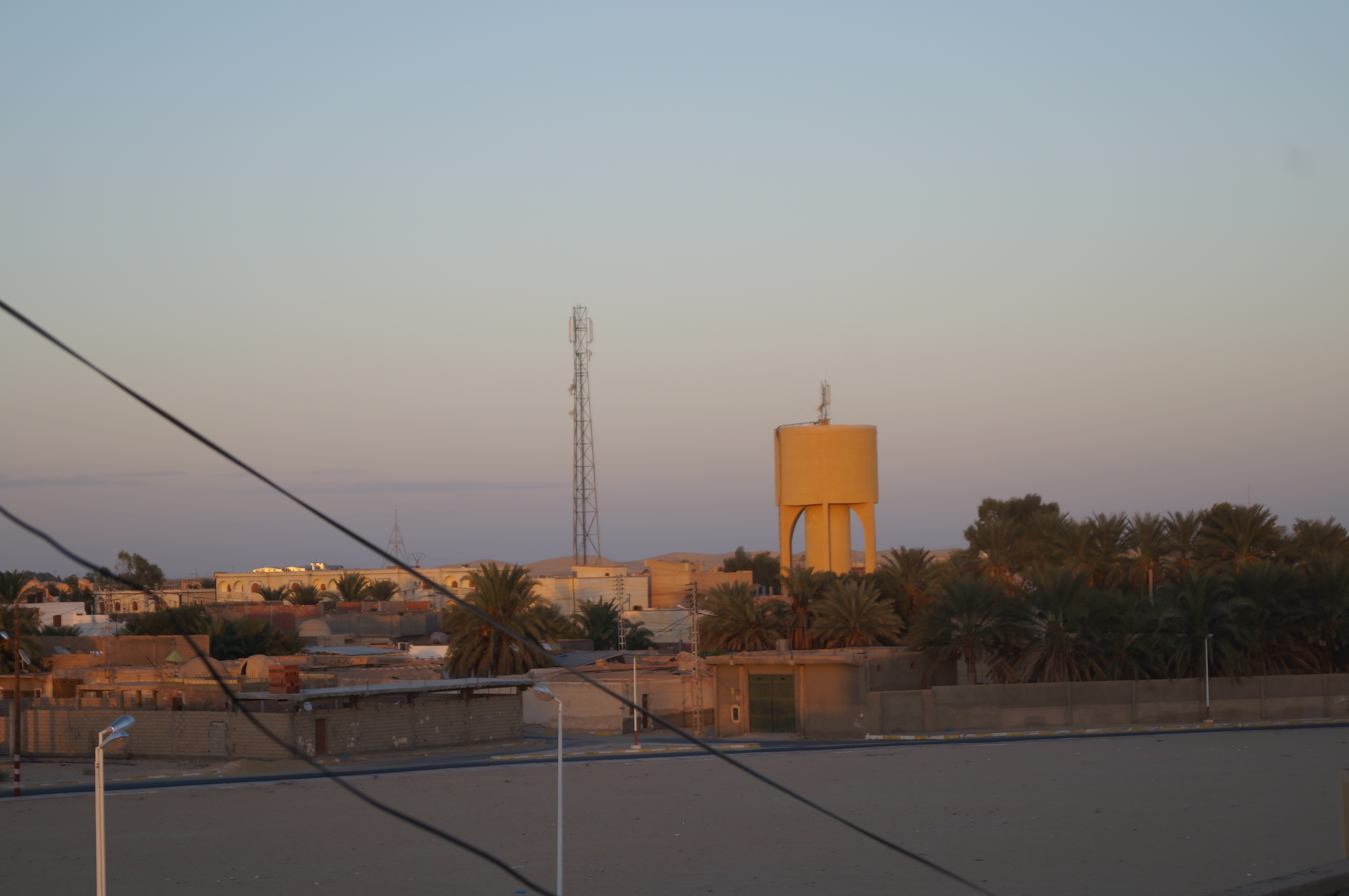
Hassani Abdelkrim Municipality

== Transportation ==
Hassani Abdelkrim lies on the N16 highway, 13 kilometres (12 mi) north of El Oued on the way to Tebessa, and the Tunisian border by the N48. From El Oued the N16 continues to Touggourt, and the N48 leads north towards Biskra.

== Education ==
7.7% of the population has a tertiary education (the second highest in the province), and another 20.7% has completed secondary education. The overall literacy rate is 86.7% (the highest in the province), and is 92.7% among males (the highest in the province) and 80.6% among females (the equal highest in the province).

== Localities ==
As of 1984, the commune of Hassani Abdelkrim included the following four localities:

- Hassani Abdelkrim
- Z'Goum
- Doukkar
- Gharbia

The village of Zmila is also within the commune.
