= Bayadha =

Bayadha اﻟﺒﻴﺎﺿﺔ
- Commune and town
- Location of Bayadha commune within El Oued Province

- Location of Bayadha within Algeria
- Coordinates: 33°20′04″N 6°54′53″E
- Country: Algeria
- Province: El Oued Province
- District: Bayadha District (coextensive)
- Elevation: 84 m (276 ft)

Population (2008)
  - Total: 32,926
- Time zone: UTC+1 (CET)

Bayadha (Arabic: اﻟﺒﻴﺎﺿﺔ) is a town and commune, coextensive with Bayadha District, in El Oued Province, Algeria. According to the 2008 census it has a population of 32,926, up from 26,535 in 1998, with an annual growth rate of 2.2%. Most of the commune's population lives in the urban area of the provincial capital El Oued.

== Climate ==
Bayadha has a hot desert climate (Köppen climate classification BWh), with very hot summers and mild winters. Rainfall is light and sporadic, and summers are particularly dry.

== Transportation ==
Bayadha effectively forms the inner southern suburbs of El Oued, and is well connected to both the central city and the outer southern suburbs in Robbah. Local roads in the commune also lead northeast to Trifaoui and southeast to Nakhla and El Ogla.

== Education ==
5.8% of the population has a tertiary education, and another 16.8% has completed secondary education. The overall literacy rate is 80.1%, and is 86.2% among males and 73.4% among females.

== Localities ==
The commune of Bayadha is composed of seven localities:

- Bayada
- Soualah
- Teraïka
- Sidi Slimane
- Ababsa
- Oued Ouragh
- Ouled Ayed
