= Magrane =

Magrane may refer to:

- Magrane (surname), including a list of people with the name
- Magrane District, a district of El Oued Province, Algeria
  - Magrane, Algeria, a town and commune, capital of the district
- Magrane, Chad, a town and prefecture in Chad

== See also ==
- McGrane
