= Débidibi =

- Village
- Location within Algeria
- Coordinates: 33°13′10″N 6°53′8″E
- Country: Algeria
- Province: El Oued Province
- District: Robbah District
- Commune: Robbah
- Elevation: 86 m (282 ft)
- Time zone: UTC+1 (CET)

Débidibi is a village in the commune of Robbah, in Robbah District, El Oued Province, Algeria. The village is located 7 kilometres (4.3 mi) south of Robbah and 17 kilometres (11 mi) south of the provincial capital El Oued.
