= Khobna =

- Village
- Location within Algeria
- Coordinates: 33°24′44″N 6°57′15″E
- Country: Algeria
- Province: El Oued Province
- District: Hassi Khelifa District
- Commune: Trifaoui
- Elevation: 70 m (230 ft)
- Time zone: UTC+1 (CET)

Khobna (also written Krebna) is a village in the commune of Trifaoui, in Hassi Khelifa District, El Oued Province, Algeria. The village is located 2 kilometres (1.2 mi) southeast of Trifaoui and 10 kilometres (6.2 mi) northeast of the provincial capital El Oued.
