= Gottaï =

Gottaï القطاي
- Village
- Location within Algeria
- Coordinates: 33°38′N 6°54′E
- Country: Algeria
- Province: El Oued Province
- District: Magrane District
- Commune: Magrane
- Elevation: 36 m (118 ft)
- Time zone: UTC+1 (CET)

Gottaï (also written El Gottaï) is a village in the commune of Magrane, El Oued Province, Algeria. It is located 28 kilometres (17 mi) north of the provincial capital El Oued.

It has been described as a "minor place", with "indefinite borders".
