= Ababsa =

- Village
- Location within Algeria
- Coordinates: 33°20′13″N 6°53′36″E
- Country: Algeria
- Province: El Oued Province
- District: Bayadha District
- Commune: Bayadha
- Elevation: 81 m (266 ft)
- Time zone: UTC+1 (CET)

Ababsa (also written El Ababsa) is a suburb in the commune of Bayadha, in Bayadha District, El Oued Province, Algeria. It is part of the urban area of El Oued.
