= Mih Lachache =

- Village
- Location within Algeria
- Coordinates: 33°11′45″N 6°31′56″E
- Country: Algeria
- Province: El Oued Province
- District: Mih Ouensa District
- Commune: Mih Ouensa
- Elevation: 97 m (318 ft)
- Time zone: UTC+1 (CET)

Mih Lachache (also written Mouiat el Achech) is a village in the commune of Mih Ouensa, in Mih Ouensa District, El Oued Province, Algeria. The village is located 17 kilometres (11 mi) west of Mih Ouensa and 35 kilometres (22 mi) southwest of the provincial capital El Oued.
