= Bougoufa =

- Village
- Location within Algeria
- Coordinates: 33°6′23″N 6°45′50″E
- Country: Algeria
- Province: El Oued Province
- District: Mih Ouensa District
- Commune: Mih Ouensa
- Elevation: 98 m (322 ft)
- Time zone: UTC+1 (CET)

Bougoufa (also written Bou Goufa) is a village in the commune of Mih Ouensa, in Mih Ouensa District, El Oued Province, Algeria. The village is located 12 kilometres (7.5 mi) southeast of Mih Ouensa and 30 kilometres (19 mi) southwest of the provincial capital El Oued.
