= Hobba =

- Village
- Location within Algeria
- Coordinates: 33°36′21″N 6°45′9″E
- Country: Algeria
- Province: El Oued Province
- District: Reguiba District
- Commune: Reguiba
- Elevation: 44 m (144 ft)
- Time zone: UTC+1 (CET)

Hobba (Arabic: هُبّة) is a village in the commune of Reguiba, in Reguiba District, El Oued Province, Algeria. The village is located on the N48 highway at the junction with a local road leading to Reguiba, 29 kilometres (18 mi) northwest of El Oued.
