= Chégamat =

- Village
- Location within Algeria
- Coordinates: 33°14′32″N 6°47′36″E
- Country: Algeria
- Province: El Oued Province
- District: Mih Ouensa District
- Commune: Oued El Alenda
- Elevation: 94 m (308 ft)
- Time zone: UTC+1 (CET)

Chégamat (also written Chegamate) is a village in the commune of Oued El Alenda, in Mih Ouensa District, El Oued Province, Algeria. The village is located 3 kilometres (1.9 mi) southeast of Oued El Alenda and 15 kilometres (9.3 mi) southwest of the provincial capital El Oued.
