= Lizerg =

- Village
- Location within Algeria
- Coordinates: 33°24′5″N 6°57′44″E
- Country: Algeria
- Province: El Oued Province
- District: Hassi Khelifa District
- Commune: Trifaoui
- Elevation: 72 m (236 ft)
- Time zone: UTC+1 (CET)

Lizerg is a village in the commune of Trifaoui, in Hassi Khelifa District, El Oued Province, Algeria. The village is located 3.5 kilometres (2.2 mi) southeast of Trifaoui and 11 kilometres (6.8 mi) northeast of the provincial capital El Oued.
