= El Kataf =

- Village
- Location within Algeria
- Coordinates: 33°11′15″N 6°39′44″E
- Country: Algeria
- Province: El Oued Province
- District: Mih Ouensa District
- Commune: Mih Ouensa
- Elevation: 96 m (315 ft)
- Time zone: UTC+1 (CET)

El Kafaf (also written El Ktaf) is a village in the commune of Mih Ouensa, in Mih Ouensa District, El Oued Province, Algeria. The village is located on a local road that branches off to the northwest from the N16 highway, 4.5 kilometres (2.8 mi) southwest of Mih Ouensa and 27 kilometres (17 mi) southwest of the provincial capital El Oued.
