= Dabadib =

- Village
- Location within Algeria
- Coordinates: 33°12′24″N 6°46′25″E
- Country: Algeria
- Province: El Oued Province
- District: Mih Ouensa District
- Commune: Oued El Alenda
- Elevation: 99 m (325 ft)
- Time zone: UTC+1 (CET)

Dabadib (also written Debadib) is a village that is located in the commune of Oued El Alenda, in the Mih Ouensa District of El Oued Province, Algeria.

The village is located 3 kilometres (1.9 mi) southeast of Oued El Alenda and 19 kilometres (12 mi) southwest of the provincial capital El Oued.
