= Sahabane =

- Village
- Location within Algeria
- Coordinates: 33°10′33″N 6°44′0″E
- Country: Algeria
- Province: El Oued Province
- District: Mih Ouensa District
- Commune: Mih Ouensa
- Elevation: 99 m (325 ft)
- Time zone: UTC+1 (CET)

Sahabane (also written Sahbane) is a village in the commune of Mih Ouensa, in Mih Ouensa District, El Oued Province, Algeria. The village is located 4 kilometres (2.5 mi) southeast of Mih Ouensa and 24 kilometres (15 mi) southwest of the provincial capital El Oued.
