= Oudeï Tork =

Oudeï Turk
- Village
- Location within Algeria
- Coordinates: 33°14′52″N 6°39′52″E
- Country: Algeria
- Province: El Oued Province
- District: Mih Ouensa District
- Commune: Mih Ouensa
- Elevation: 94 m (308 ft)
- Time zone: UTC+1 (CET)

Oudeï Turk (also written Oudeï Trek) is a village in the commune of Mih Ouensa, in Mih Ouensa District, El Oued Province, Algeria. The village is located 7 kilometres (4.3 mi) northwest of Mih Ouensa and 22 kilometres (14 mi) southwest of the provincial capital El Oued.
