= Souihla =

- Village
- Location within Algeria
- Coordinates: 33°31′8″N 6°53′49″E
- Country: Algeria
- Province: El Oued Province
- District: Magrane District
- Commune: Sidi Aoun
- Elevation: 56 m (184 ft)
- Time zone: UTC+1 (CET)

Souihla (also written Souehla) is a village in the commune of Sidi Aoun, in Magrane District, El Oued Province, Algeria. The village is located to the north-west of the N3 highway 18 kilometres (11 mi) northeast of El Oued.
