= Reguiba =

Reguiba اﻟﺮﻗﻴﺒﺔ
- Commune and town
- Location of Reguiba commune within El Oued Province

- Location of Reguiba within Algeria
- Coordinates: 33°34′N 6°43′E
- Country: Algeria
- Province: El Oued Province
- District: Reguiba District
- Elevation: 56 m (184 ft)

Population (2008)
  - Total: 40,367
- Time zone: UTC+1 (CET)

Reguiba (Arabic: اﻟﺮﻗﻴﺒﺔ) is a town and commune, and capital of Reguiba District, in El Oued Province, Algeria. According to the 2008 census it has a population of 40,367. The population grew from 30,392 in 1998, to where it is today. It has an annual growth rate of 2.9%.

== Climate ==
Reguiba has a hot desert climate (Köppen climate classification BWh), with very hot summers and mild winters. Very little precipitation throughout the year.

Climate data for Reguiba
Month	Jan	Feb	Mar	Apr	May	Jun	Jul	Aug	Sep	Oct	Nov	Dec	Year
Mean daily maximum °C (°F)	17.0 (62.6)	19.5 (67.1)	23.5 (74.3)	28.0 (82.4)	32.8 (91.0)	37.5 (99.5)	41.2 (106.2)	40.3 (104.5)	35.7 (96.3)	29.0 (84.2)	22.1 (71.8)	17.3 (63.1)	28.7 (83.6)
Daily mean °C (°F)	10.7 (51.3)	13.0 (55.4)	16.6 (61.9)	20.7 (69.3)	25.3 (77.5)	30.3 (86.5)	33.2 (91.8)	32.6 (90.7)	28.8 (83.8)	22.4 (72.3)	15.9 (60.6)	11.4 (52.5)	21.7 (71.1)
Mean daily minimum °C (°F)	4.5 (40.1)	6.6 (43.9)	9.7 (49.5)	13.4 (56.1)	17.9 (64.2)	23.1 (73.6)	25.3 (77.5)	24.9 (76.8)	21.9 (71.4)	15.9 (60.6)	9.8 (49.6)	5.5 (41.9)	14.9 (58.8)
Average precipitation mm (inches)	9 (0.4)	8 (0.3)	11 (0.4)	7 (0.3)	6 (0.2)	2 (0.1)	0 (0)	1 (0.0)	6 (0.2)	9 (0.4)	10 (0.4)	8 (0.3)	77 (3)
Source: climate-data.org

== Transportation ==
Local roads connect the town to the N48 highway, including one that joins at Guemar, leading south to the provincial capital El Oued and north to Still and Biskra via the N3 highway.

== Education ==
3.6% of the population has a tertiary education and another 12.3% has completed secondary education. The overall literacy rate is 72.3% and is 78.9% among males and 65.6% among females.

== Localities ==
The commune of Reguiba is composed of 15 localities:

- Reguiba
- Hobba
- Debaïa
- Khobna
- Nezla
- Cherguia
- Aouaïssa
- El Arfji
- Nador
- Djaïkh
- Ouaziten
- Halk Louad
- Bir Bachir
- Guerraïna
- Sif El Menadi
