= Mih Moulahoum =

- Village
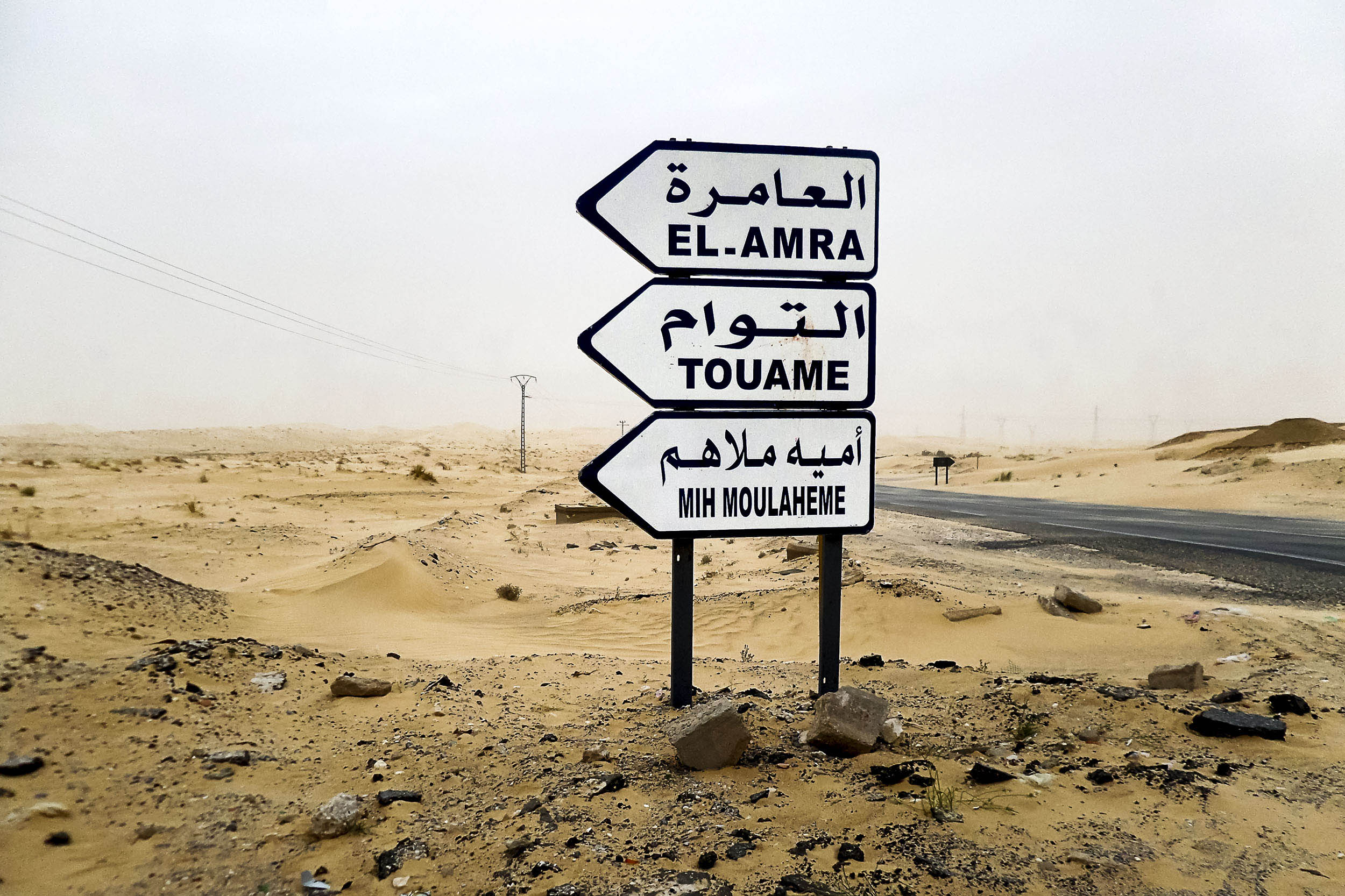
- Mih Moulahoum

- Location within Algeria
- Coordinates: 33°7′23″N 6°43′11″E
- Country: Algeria
- Province: El Oued Province
- District: Mih Ouensa District
- Commune: Mih Ouensa
- Elevation: 100 m (330 ft)
- Time zone: UTC+1 (CET)

Mih Moulahoum (also written Moui Oum el Ahoum) is a village in the commune of Mih Ouensa, in Mih Ouensa District, El Oued Province, Algeria. The village is located 8 kilometres (5.0 mi) south of Mih Ouensa and 30 kilometres (19 mi) southwest of the provincial capital El Oued.
