= Méguibra =

- Village
- Location within Algeria
- Coordinates: 34°15′31″N 6°0′52″E
- Country: Algeria
- Province: El Oued Province
- District: Reguiba District
- Commune: Hamraia
- Elevation: −11 m (−36 ft)
- Time zone: UTC+1 (CET)
- Postal code: 39065

Méguibra is a village in the commune of Hamraia, in Reguiba District, El Oued Province, Algeria. The village is located just to the north of the N43 national highway just east of its junction with the N3 highway, and despite being in the commune of Hamraia, it is actually much nearer to the town of Still.
