= El Arfji =

- Village
- Location within Algeria
- Coordinates: 33°30′27″N 6°39′42″E
- Country: Algeria
- Province: El Oued Province
- District: Reguiba District
- Commune: Reguiba
- Elevation: 69 m (226 ft)
- Time zone: UTC+1 (CET)

El Arfji (also written El Arfsi) is a village in the commune of Reguiba, in Reguiba District, El Oued Province, Algeria. The village is located on a local road 8 kilometres (5.0 mi) southwest of Reguibra.
