= Sidi Slimane, El Oued =

Sidi Slimane
- Village
- Location within Algeria
- Coordinates: 33°20′1″N 6°55′0″E
- Country: Algeria
- Province: El Oued Province
- District: Bayadha District
- Commune: Bayadha
- Elevation: 84 m (276 ft)
- Time zone: UTC+1 (CET)

Sidi Slimane is a village in the commune of Bayadha, in Bayadha District, El Oued Province, Algeria. The village is located 6 kilometres (3.7 mi) southeast of the provincial capital El Oued.
