= Bayada =

Bayada may refer to one of the following:

- Bayada, Lebanon, a village in Lebanon
- Bayada, Ma'ale Iron, a village in Israel
- Bayada Home Health Care, a home health care company

== See also ==
- Bayadha, a town and commune in El Oued Province, Algeria
- Bayadha District, El Oued Province, Algeria
