= Ourmes =

Ourmes ورماس
- Commune and town
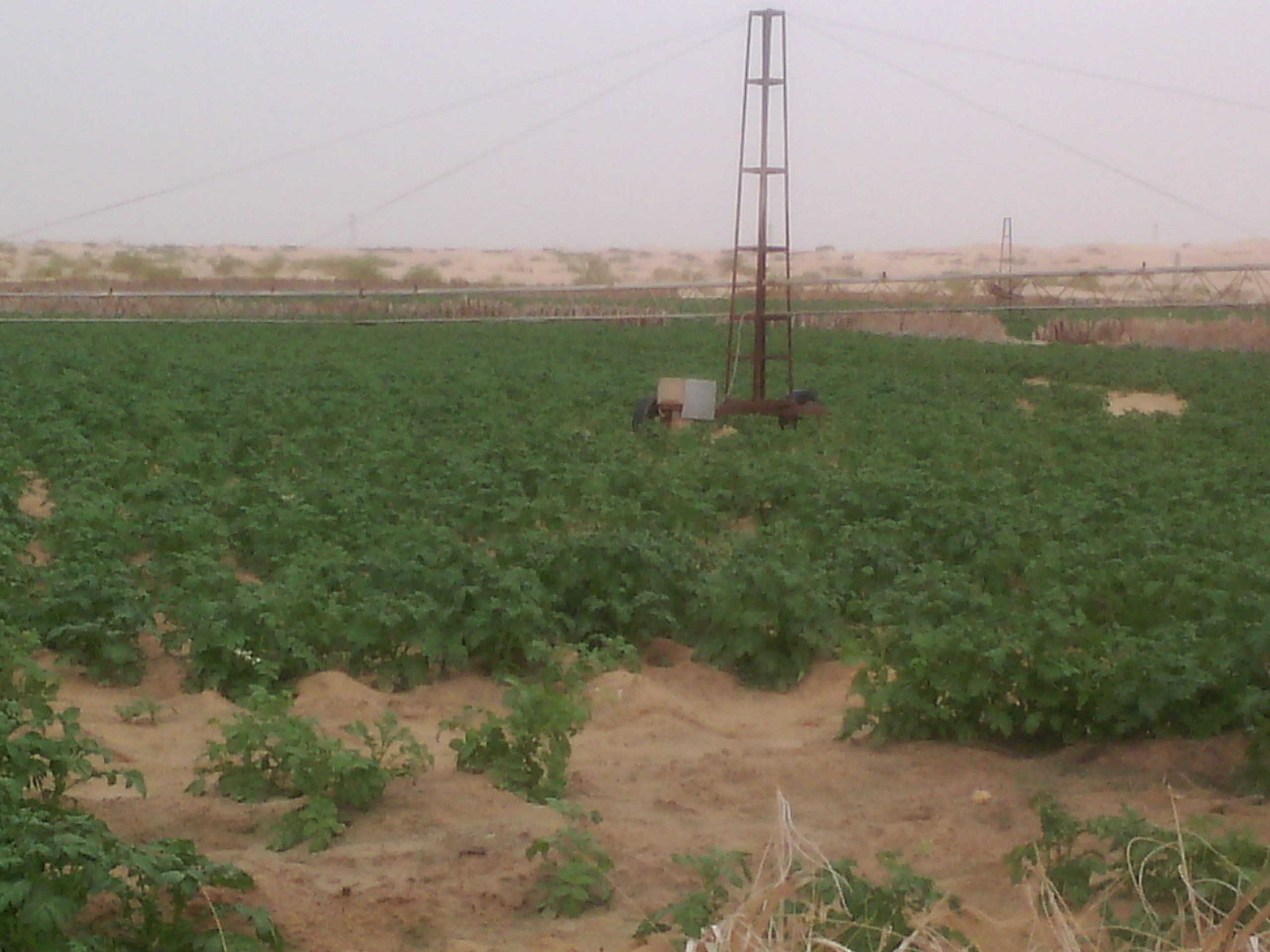

- Location of Ourmes commune within El Oued Province

- Location of Ourmes in Algeria
- Coordinates: 33°24′49″N 6°46′51″E
- Country: Algeria
- Province: El Oued Province
- District: Guemar District

Government
  - Type: Municipality

Area
  - Total: 443 km^{2} (171 sq mi)
- Elevation: 76 m (249 ft)

Population (2008)
  - Total: 5,900
- Time zone: UTC+1 (CET)
- Postal code: 39460

Ourmes (Arabic: ورماس) (also written Ourmas) is a town and commune in Guemar District, El Oued Province, Algeria. According to the 2008 census it has a population of 5,900, up from 5,059 in 1998, with an annual growth rate of 1.6%. It is located 9 kilometres (5.6 mi) northwest of the provincial capital El Oued, and is connected by local roads to Kouinine and Taghzout.

== Climate ==
Ourmes has a hot desert climate (Köppen climate classification BWh), with very hot summers and mild winters. Rainfall is light and sporadic, and summers are particularly dry.

== Education ==
4.9% of the population has a tertiary education, and another 12.7% has completed secondary education. The overall literacy rate is 79.7%, and is 86.0% among males and 73.3% among females.

== Localities ==
The commune of Ourmes is composed of three localities:

- Ourmés
- Hadhoudi
- Legouiret
