= Oum Sahaouine =

- Village
- Location within Algeria
- Coordinates: 33°18′31″N 6°48′37″E
- Country: Algeria
- Province: El Oued Province
- District: El Oued District
- Commune: El Oued
- Elevation: 85 m (279 ft)
- Time zone: UTC+1 (CET)

Oum Sahaouine (also written Oum Sahouine) is a village in the commune of El Oued, in El Oued District, El Oued Province, Algeria. The village is located 8 kilometres (5.0 mi) southeast of El Oued city, and is accessible by a local road to the south of the N16 highway.
