= Guemmar attack =

Militant attack on a border post in Algeria

- Part of the Algerian Civil War
- Location: Guemmar, Algeria
- Date: 29 November 1991
- Deaths: 3 policemen
- Perpetrator: Aïssa Messaoudi
- No. of participants: 60 Islamist militants

The Guemmar attack was an attack by armed militants on a border post in Guemmar on 29 November 1991. Sixty armed Islamist militants led by Aïssa Messaoudi, an Algerian Islamist who fought in the Soviet–Afghan War and had connections with Takfir wal-Hijra and the Islamic Salvation Front, attacked a border post in Guemmar, near El Oued in Algeria, killing three policemen. The Islamists (allegedly Takfir wal-Hijra) were associated with the FIS-affiliated Islamist trade union. This has been considered as the first act of jihad against the government and beginning of the Armed Islamic Movement, prior to the beginning of the proper Algerian Civil War.

== Background ==
The weeks before the declaration by the Islamic Salvation Front saw a few violent incidents by Islamist militants. The first act of provocation happened in January 1991 when Ali Benhadj, dressed in military uniform, organized a march to the Ministry of Defense to pressure them into fighting for the Iraqi side in the Gulf War. Ahmed Ben Bella frequently had his meetings disrupted by stone-throwing Islamists, and on one occasion Islamist militants attacked a residence of the FLN where Mouloud Hamrouche was holding a meeting on 1 November. These became more serious when police discovered significant caches of arms in El Oued, leading to shootout incidents with militants.

== Attack ==
On 29 November 1991, three small groups of 60 Islamist militants attacked a border post in Guemmar at night with heavy fire before attempting to rob the armory. It was defended by a small garrison of the 15th Border Guard Group that was surrounded by desert. Although the militants killed 3 policemen, sleeping soldiers woke up and managed to repel the attackers, forcing them to flee. The militants got away with around 50 weapons, as well as other arms, ammunition, and explosives.

The group of attackers was composed mainly of veterans who had participated in the Soviet–Afghan War. The government claimed these attacks were indications of a planned Islamist terrorist campaign against the state, and were acknowledged to have been led by Aïssa Messaoudi who the police were seeking to hunt down. The Islamic Salvation Front denounced this attack and claimed it was the work of a branch of Algerian military intelligence.

== Aftermath ==
Following the attack, a skirmish occurred between the Algerian army and Islamist militants on 9 December southeast of Biskra, resulting in the killing of 13 militants and 4 soldiers.

On 14 January 1993, the Algerian Supreme Court sentenced 12 participants to death for involvement in the Guemmar attack, namely Aïssa Messaoudi, Lazhar Amar, Mohamed Nguia, Bechir Rezig, Ahmed Osman, Kamel Rukhe, Antar Tera, Tayeb Sennouga, Khalid Kessous, Lamine Athmania, Jamal Bou Djelkha, Belgacem Tlili and Abdelnacer Saidani.
