= Doukkar =

- Village
- Location within Algeria
- Coordinates: 33°28′35″N 6°53′45″E
- Country: Algeria
- Province: El Oued Province
- District: Debila District
- Commune: Hassani Abdelkrim
- Elevation: 62 m (203 ft)
- Time zone: UTC+1 (CET)

Doukkar is a village in the commune of Hassani Abdelkrim, in Debila District, El Oued Province, Algeria.
