= Trifaoui =

Trifaoui ﺗﺮﻳﻔﺎوى
- Commune and town
- Location of Trifaoui commune within El Oued Province

- Location of Trifaoui within Algeria
- Coordinates: 33°25′N 6°56′E
- Country: Algeria
- Province: El Oued Province
- District: Hassi Khelifa District
- Elevation: 71 m (233 ft)

Population (2008)
  - Total: 8,257
- Time zone: UTC+1 (CET)

Trifaoui (Arabic: ﺗﺮﻳﻔﺎوى) is a town and commune in Hassi Khelifa District, El Oued Province, Algeria. According to the 2008 census it has a population of 8,257, up from 6,361 in 1998, and an annual growth rate of 2.7%.

== Climate ==
Trifaoui has a hot desert climate (Köppen climate classification BWh), with very hot summers and mild winters. Rainfall is light and sporadic, and summers are particularly dry.

== Transportation ==
Trifaoui does not lie on any of Algeria's major highways. Local roads lead southwest to the provincial capital El Oued, north to Hassi Khelifa, Debila and Hassani Abdelkrim, and southeast to Nakhla.

== Education ==
4.1% of the population has a tertiary education, and another 13.0% has completed secondary education. The overall literacy rate is 76.5%, and is 84.7% among males and 68.4% among females.

== Localities ==
The commune of Trifaoui is composed of seven localities:

- Trifaoui
- Lizerg
- Khobna
- Mih Djaber
- Séhine
- Bellala
- Lekhbaï
