= Oum Touyour =

Oum Touyour أم اﻟﻄﻴﻮر
- Commune and town
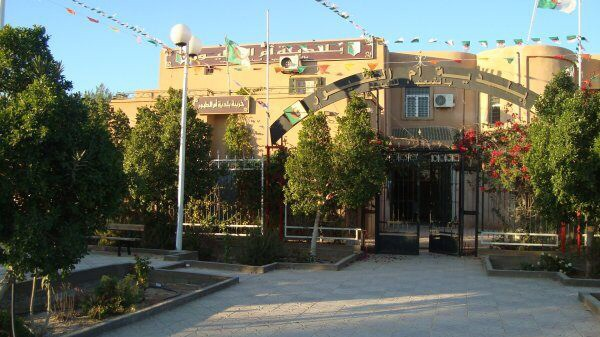

- Location of Oum Touyour commune within El M'Ghair Province

- Location of Oum Touyour within Algeria
- Coordinates: 34°9′12″N 5°50′0″E
- Country: Algeria
- Province: El M'Ghair Province
- District: El M'Ghair District
- Elevation: 13 m (43 ft)

Population (2008)
  - Total: 11,069
- Time zone: UTC+1 (CET)

Oum Touyour (Arabic: أم اﻟﻄﻴﻮر) (also written Oum Tiour or Oum Thiour) is a town and commune in El M'Ghair District, El M'Ghair Province, Algeria. According to the 2008 census it has a population of 11,069, up from 9,735 in 1998, with an annual growth rate of 1.3%, the lowest in the province.

== Climate ==
Oum Touyour has a hot desert climate (Köppen climate classification BWh), with very hot summers and mild winters, and very little precipitation throughout the year.

Climate data for Oum Touyour
Month	Jan	Feb	Mar	Apr	May	Jun	Jul	Aug	Sep	Oct	Nov	Dec	Year
Mean daily maximum °C (°F)	16.8 (62.2)	19.2 (66.6)	23.3 (73.9)	27.8 (82.0)	33.2 (91.8)	37.9 (100.2)	41.4 (106.5)	40.5 (104.9)	35.2 (95.4)	28.8 (83.8)	21.9 (71.4)	17.5 (63.5)	28.6 (83.5)
Daily mean °C (°F)	11.0 (51.8)	13.3 (55.9)	16.7 (62.1)	20.8 (69.4)	25.9 (78.6)	30.8 (87.4)	33.9 (93.0)	33.2 (91.8)	28.7 (83.7)	22.6 (72.7)	16.1 (61.0)	11.9 (53.4)	22.1 (71.7)
Mean daily minimum °C (°F)	5.3 (41.5)	7.4 (45.3)	10.2 (50.4)	13.8 (56.8)	18.6 (65.5)	23.8 (74.8)	26.4 (79.5)	26.0 (78.8)	22.3 (72.1)	16.4 (61.5)	10.4 (50.7)	6.4 (43.5)	15.6 (60.0)
Average precipitation mm (inches)	9 (0.4)	6 (0.2)	12 (0.5)	9 (0.4)	8 (0.3)	2 (0.1)	1 (0.0)	2 (0.1)	11 (0.4)	13 (0.5)	13 (0.5)	10 (0.4)	96 (3.8)
Source: climate-data.org

== Transportation ==
The regional road W300 connects Oum Touyour to national highway N3, which connects to Biskra to the north and Touggourt to the south. It is also the main link to the Oum Touyour aerodrome.

A short link called the N46A connects the N3 to Baadj just to the north, and from there the W31 leads northwest to Ouled Djellal. Further north, at Still, the N48 leaves the N3 to the southwest, connecting El Oued.

== Education ==
6.8% of the population has a tertiary education, and another 15.4% has completed secondary education. The overall literacy rate is 74.4%, and is 81.5% among males and 67.5% among females.

== Localities ==
The commune of Oum Touyour is composed of two localities:

- Oum Thiour
- Baadj
