= Hamraia =

Hamraia حمراية
- Commune and town
- Location of Hamraia commune within El Oued Province

- Location of Hamraia within Algeria
- Coordinates: 34°6′39″N 6°13′50″E
- Country: Algeria
- Province: El Oued Province
- District: Reguiba District
- Elevation: −20 m (−66 ft)

Population (2008)
  - Total: 5,172
- Time zone: UTC+1 (CET)

Hamraia (Arabic: حمراية) is a town and commune in Reguiba District, El Oued Province, Algeria. According to the 2008 census it has a population of 5,172, up from 3,938 in 1998, with an annual growth rate of 2.8%.

== Geography ==
Hamraia is near Chott Melrhir, a large endorheic salt lake that lies to the north of the town. The lake and its surrounds, including the town of Hamraia, lie below sea level. Another salt lake, Chott Felrhir, lies to the southwest of Hamraia.

== Climate ==
Hamraia has a hot desert climate (Köppen climate classification BWh), with very hot summers and mild winters, and very little precipitation throughout the year.

Climate data for Hamraia
Month	Jan	Feb	Mar	Apr	May	Jun	Jul	Aug	Sep	Oct	Nov	Dec	Year
Mean daily maximum °C (°F)	17.2 (63.0)	19.4 (66.9)	23.5 (74.3)	27.9 (82.2)	33.1 (91.6)	37.8 (100.0)	41.1 (106.0)	40.3 (104.5)	35.3 (95.5)	29.0 (84.2)	22.2 (72.0)	17.7 (63.9)	28.7 (83.7)
Daily mean °C (°F)	11.3 (52.3)	13.4 (56.1)	16.8 (62.2)	20.8 (69.4)	25.8 (78.4)	30.7 (87.3)	33.5 (92.3)	33.0 (91.4)	28.8 (83.8)	22.7 (72.9)	16.4 (61.5)	12.1 (53.8)	22.1 (71.8)
Mean daily minimum °C (°F)	5.4 (41.7)	7.4 (45.3)	10.2 (50.4)	13.8 (56.8)	18.5 (65.3)	23.7 (74.7)	26.0 (78.8)	25.8 (78.4)	22.3 (72.1)	16.5 (61.7)	10.6 (51.1)	6.5 (43.7)	15.6 (60.0)
Average precipitation mm (inches)	9 (0.4)	6 (0.2)	12 (0.5)	9 (0.4)	8 (0.3)	2 (0.1)	0 (0)	2 (0.1)	9 (0.4)	12 (0.5)	12 (0.5)	9 (0.4)	90 (3.8)
Source: climate-data.org

== Transportation ==
Hamraia is on the N48 which connect El Oued to Still. From Still, the N3 leads south to Touggourt and north to Biskra.

== Education ==
4.3% of the population has a tertiary education, and another 11.8% has completed secondary education. The overall literacy rate is 66.6%, and is 71.9% among males and 61.2% among females.

== Localities ==
The commune of Hamraia is composed of two localities:

- Hamraïa
- Méguibra
