= Mih Ouensa =

Mih Ouensa ﻣﻴﺔ وﻧﺴﺔ
- Commune and town
- Location of Mih Ouensa commune within El Oued Province

- Location of Mih Ouensa within Algeria
- Coordinates: 33°11′49″N 6°42′19″E
- Country: Algeria
- Province: El Oued Province
- District: Mih Ouensa District
- Elevation: 97 m (318 ft)

Population (2008)
  - Total: 15,593
- Time zone: UTC+1 (CET)

Mih Ouensa (sometimes written Mih Ouansa or Mouïaf Ouennsa) is a town and commune, and capital of Mih Ouensa District, in El Oued Province, Algeria. According to the 2008 census it has a population of 15,593, up from 11,779 in 1998, and a population growth rate of 3.3%.

== Climate ==
Mih Ouensa has a hot desert climate (Köppen climate classification BWh), with very hot summers and mild winters, and very little precipitation throughout the year.

Climate data for Mih Ouensa
Month	Jan	Feb	Mar	Apr	May	Jun	Jul	Aug	Sep	Oct	Nov	Dec	Year
Mean daily maximum °C (°F)	16.9 (62.4)	19.5 (67.1)	23.5 (74.3)	28.1 (82.6)	32.9 (91.2)	37.6 (99.7)	41.6 (106.9)	40.5 (104.9)	36.1 (97.0)	29.1 (84.4)	22.1 (71.8)	17.0 (62.6)	28.7 (83.7)
Daily mean °C (°F)	10.4 (50.7)	12.8 (55.0)	16.4 (61.5)	20.6 (69.1)	25.4 (77.7)	30.2 (86.4)	33.4 (92.1)	32.5 (90.5)	28.9 (84.0)	22.3 (72.1)	15.7 (60.3)	10.9 (51.6)	21.6 (70.9)
Mean daily minimum °C (°F)	4.0 (39.2)	6.2 (43.2)	9.4 (48.9)	13.2 (55.8)	17.9 (64.2)	22.9 (73.2)	25.2 (77.4)	24.6 (76.3)	21.7 (71.1)	15.6 (60.1)	9.4 (48.9)	4.9 (40.8)	14.6 (58.3)
Average precipitation mm (inches)	9 (0.4)	6 (0.2)	9 (0.4)	6 (0.2)	5 (0.2)	2 (0.1)	0 (0)	1 (0.0)	4 (0.2)	7 (0.3)	10 (0.4)	9 (0.4)	68 (2.8)
Source: climate-data.org

== Transportation ==
Mih Ouensa lies on the N16, which connects Touggourt to El Oued. From El Oued the road continues northeast to Tébessa. A local road also leads north to Ourmas.

== Education ==
2.0% of the population has a tertiary education, and another 6.6% has completed secondary education. The overall literacy rate is 63.3%, and is 71.3% among males and 55.0% among females.

== Localities ==
The commune of Mih Ouensa is composed of 14 localities:

- Mih Ouensa
- Oudeï Tork
- Riad Ouansa
- Adel Ouansa (Territories)
- El Kataf
- Touam
- Bent Lemk Oucher
- Bougoufa
- Sahabane
- Mih Moulahoum
- Baboukha
- Bel Ghit
- Draa Lahmar
- Djérada
- Mih Lachache
- Hériouila
