= Taghzout, El Oued =

Taghzout ﺗﺎﻏﺰوت
- Commune and town
- Location of Taghzout commune within El Oued Province

- Location of Taghzout within Algeria
- Coordinates: 33°29′N 6°45′E
- Country: Algeria
- Province: El Oued Province
- District: Guemar District
- Elevation: 65 m (213 ft)

Population (2008)
  - Total: 13,934
- Time zone: UTC+1 (CET)

Taghzout (Arabic: ﺗﺎﻏﺰوت) is a town and commune in Guemar District, El Oued Province, Algeria. According to the 2008 census it has a population of 13,934, up from 11,147 in 1998, with an annual growth rate of 2.3%. Taghzout is adjacent to the town of Guemar, and is 13 kilometres (8.1 mi) from the provincial capital, El Oued.

== Climate ==
Taghzout has a hot desert climate (Köppen climate classification BWh), with very hot summers and mild winters. Rainfall is light and sporadic, and summers are particularly dry.

== Transportation ==
Taghzout is on the N48 highway connecting El Oued to the south and Still to the north. From Still, the N3 leads to Biskra.

Taghzout is served by Guemar Airport.

== Education ==
4.6% of the population has a tertiary education, and another 11.7% has completed secondary education. The overall literacy rate is 80.1%, and is 87.7% among males and 72.1% among females.

== Localities ==
The commune of Taghzout is composed of seven localities:

- Taghzout
- Bagouza
