= Sidi Aoun =

Sidi Aoun ﺳﻴﺪي ﻋﻮن
- Commune and town
- Location of Sidi Aoun commune within El Oued Province

- Location of Sidi Aoun within Algeria
- Coordinates: 33°32′32″N 6°54′18″E
- Country: Algeria
- Province: El Oued Province
- District: Magrane District
- Elevation: 52 m (171 ft)

Population (2008)
  - Total: 12,235
- Time zone: UTC+1 (CET)

Sidi Aoun (Arabic: ﺳﻴﺪي ﻋﻮن) is a town and commune in Magrane District, El Oued Province, Algeria. According to the 2008 census it has a population of 12,235, up from 10,018 in 1998, and an annual growth rate of 2.1%. Sidi Aoun is connected by local roads to Hassani Abdelkrim and Debila, two towns just north-east of El Oued.

== Climate ==
Sidi Aoun has a hot desert climate (Köppen climate classification BWh), with very hot summers and mild winters. Rainfall is light and sporadic, and summers are particularly dry.

== Education ==
5.4% of the population has a tertiary education, and another 12.5% has completed secondary education. The overall literacy rate is 75.6%, and is 65.9% among males and 55.8% among females.

== Localities ==
The commune of Sidi Aoun is composed of four localities:

- Sidi Aoun
- Souihla
- Ladhouaou
- Djedeïda
