= Ghamra =

- Village
- Location within Algeria
- Coordinates: 33°32′0″N 6°47′0″E
- Country: Algeria
- Province: El Oued Province
- District: Guemar District
- Commune: Guemar
- Elevation: 58 m (190 ft)
- Time zone: UTC+1 (CET)

Ghamra (also written Rhamra) is a village in the commune of Guemar, in Guemar District, El Oued Province, Algeria. The village is located just to the west of the N48 highway 5 kilometres (3.1 mi) north of Guemar.
