= Sif El Menadi =

- Village
- Location within Algeria
- Coordinates: 33°57′42″N 6°22′12″E
- Country: Algeria
- Province: El Oued Province
- District: Reguiba District
- Commune: Reguiba
- Elevation: −20 m (−66 ft)
- Time zone: UTC+1 (CET)

Sif El Menadi is a village in the commune of Reguiba, in Reguiba District, El Oued Province, Algeria. The village is located 7 kilometres (4.3 mi) southwest of the N48 highway .
