= Drimini =

- Village
- Location within Algeria
- Coordinates: 33°31′54″N 6°55′57″E
- Country: Algeria
- Province: El Oued Province
- District: Debila District
- Commune: Debila
- Elevation: 52 m (171 ft)
- Time zone: UTC+1 (CET)

Drimini (Arabic: الدريميني) is a village in the commune of Debila, in Debila District, El Oued Province, Algeria. The village is located 6 kilometres (3.7 mi) north of Debila, to which it is connected by a local road.
