= Aïssa Messaoudi =

Algerian Islamist

- Died: November 1992
- Occupation: Algerian Islamist
- Known for: Afghan War

Aïssa Messaoudi, nom de guerre Tayeb el-Afghani, was an Algerian Islamist. He fought in the Afghan War. Together with a fellow Afghan veteran, Abderrahmane Dahane, he launched an attack on the Guemmar barracks on November 29, 1991, before the start of the Algerian Civil War proper; this attack is sometimes considered to mark the beginning of the Armed Islamic Movement (MIA). He was arrested on January 28, 1992.

He was sentenced to death on 4 May 1992. He died in November 1992.
