= Beni Guecha =

Beni Guecha may refer to:

- Ben Guecha, a town in El Oued Province, Algeria
- Yahia Beniguecha, a town in Mila Province, Algeria
