= El Ogla, El Oued =

El Ogla اﻟﻌﻘﻠﺔ
- Commune and town
- Location of El Ogla commune within El Oued Province

- Location of El Ogla within Algeria
- Coordinates: 33°15′N 6°57′E
- Country: Algeria
- Province: El Oued Province
- District: Robbah District
- Elevation: 90 m (300 ft)

Population (2008)
  - Total: 6,102
- Time zone: UTC+1 (CET)

El Ogla (Arabic: اﻟﻌﻘﻠﺔ) is a town and commune in Robbah District, El Oued Province, Algeria. According to the 2008 census it has a population of 6,102, up from 4,715 in 1998, with an annual growth rate of 2.7%.

== Climate ==
El Ogla has a hot desert climate (Köppen climate classification BWh), with very hot summers and mild winters. Rainfall is light and sporadic, and summers are particularly dry.

== Transportation ==
El Olga is 15 kilometres (9.3 mi) southeast of the provincial capital El Oued. It is also connected by local roads to the towns of Robbah and Nakhla to the north.

== Education ==
3.4% of the population has a tertiary education, and another 11.2% has completed secondary education. The overall literacy rate is 71.9%, and is 79.8% among males and 63.9% among females.

== Localities ==
The commune of El Ogla is composed of three localities:

- Ogla
- El Aguila
- Sendrous
