= Nakhla, Algeria =

Nakhla اﻟﻨﺨﻠﺔ
- Commune and town
- Location of Nakhla commune within El Oued Province

- Location of Nakhla within Algeria
- Coordinates: 33°17′N 6°57′E
- Country: Algeria
- Province: El Oued Province
- District: Robbah District
- Elevation: 84 m (276 ft)

Population (2008)
  - Total: 12,652
- Time zone: UTC+1 (CET)

Nakhla (Arabic: اﻟﻨﺨﻠﺔ) (sometimes written Nekhla) is a town and commune in Robbah District, El Oued Province, Algeria. According to the 2008 census it has a population of 12,652, up from 9,491 in 1998, with an annual growth rate of 3.0%.

== Climate ==
Nakhla has a hot desert climate (Köppen climate classification BWh), with very hot summers and mild winters. Rainfall is light and sporadic, and summers are particularly dry.

== Transportation ==
Nakhla is 13 kilometres (8 mi) southeast of the provincial capital El Oued, to which it is connected by a local road. It is also connected to Robbah to the west, El Ogla to the south, and Trifaoui to the north.

== Education ==
4.9% of the population has a tertiary education, and another 12.9% has completed secondary education. The overall literacy rate is 73.8%, and is 81.4% among males and 65.9% among females.

== Localities ==
The commune of Nakhla is composed of three localities:

- Nakhla
- Nakhla Gherbia
- Khobna
