= Ben Guecha =

Ben Guecha ﺑﻦ ﻗﺸﺔ
- Commune and town
- Location of Ben Guecha commune within El Oued Province

- Location of Ben Guecha within Algeria
- Coordinates: 34°12′19″N 7°36′55″E
- Country: Algeria
- Province: El Oued Province
- District: Taleb Larbi District
- Elevation: 28 m (92 ft)

Population (2008)
  - Total: 2,513
- Time zone: UTC+1 (CET)

Ben Guecha (Arabic: ﺑﻦ ﻗﺸﺔ) is a town and commune in Taleb Larbi District, El Oued Province, Algeria. According to the 2008 census it has a population of 2,513, up from 1,036 in 1998, with an annual growth rate of 9.5%, the highest in the province.

== Climate ==
Ben Guecha has a hot desert climate (Köppen climate classification BWh), with very hot summers and mild winters, and very little precipitation throughout the year.

Climate data for Ben Guecha
Month	Jan	Feb	Mar	Apr	May	Jun	Jul	Aug	Sep	Oct	Nov	Dec	Year
Mean daily maximum °C (°F)	16.6 (61.9)	19.1 (66.4)	22.6 (72.7)	26.5 (79.7)	31.6 (88.9)	35.9 (96.6)	39.6 (103.3)	38.8 (101.8)	34.0 (93.2)	28.2 (82.8)	21.8 (71.2)	16.9 (62.4)	27.6 (81.7)
Daily mean °C (°F)	10.9 (51.6)	13.1 (55.6)	16.0 (60.8)	19.7 (67.5)	24.5 (76.1)	28.9 (84.0)	31.9 (89.4)	31.5 (88.7)	27.6 (81.7)	22.1 (71.8)	16.1 (61.0)	11.5 (52.7)	21.2 (70.1)
Mean daily minimum °C (°F)	5.3 (41.5)	7.2 (45.0)	9.5 (49.1)	12.9 (55.2)	17.4 (63.3)	22.0 (71.6)	24.3 (75.7)	24.3 (75.7)	21.3 (70.3)	16.0 (60.8)	10.4 (50.7)	6.2 (43.2)	14.7 (58.5)
Average precipitation mm (inches)	10 (0.4)	8 (0.3)	13 (0.5)	10 (0.4)	9 (0.4)	4 (0.2)	1 (0.0)	3 (0.1)	10 (0.4)	11 (0.4)	13 (0.5)	9 (0.4)	101 (4)
Source: climate-data.org

== Transportation ==
The town of Ben Guecha lies in the isolated far north-eastern corner of El Oued Province. A local road leads to the N16 which connects El Oued to Tebessa.

== Education ==
2.1% of the population has a tertiary education, and another 8.6% has completed secondary education. The overall literacy rate is 52.2%, and is 60.8% among males and 43.4% among females; all three figures are the second lowest in the province after Douar El Ma.

== Localities ==
The commune of Ben Guecha is composed of 17 localities:

- Ben Guecha
- Douilat
- Rass Touneb
- Ben Younès
- El Babouche
- Bouhabline
- El Ogla
- Bir Souamèche
- Djourara
- Biar El Jouder
- Laklabia
- Chott El Khala
- El Ammari
- El Houche
- Ogla Dhafria
- Foum El Gharsa
- Mekhatih
