= Oued El Alenda =

Oued El Alenda وادى اﻟﻌﻠﻨﺪة
- Commune and town
- Location of Oued El Alenda commune within El Oued Province

- Location of Oued El Alenda within Algeria
- Coordinates: 33°13′44″N 6°45′26″E
- Country: Algeria
- Province: El Oued Province
- District: Mih Ouensa District
- Elevation: 95 m (312 ft)

Population (2008)
  - Total: 6,830
- Time zone: UTC+1 (CET)

Oued El Alenda (Arabic: وادى اﻟﻌﻠﻨﺪة) is a town and commune in Mih Ouensa District, El Oued Province, Algeria. According to the 2008 census it has a population of 6,830, up from 5,839 in 1998, with an annual growth rate of 1.6%. The town is 17 kilometres (11 mi) southwest of the provincial capital El Oued, on the N16 highway connecting it to Touggourt.

== Climate ==
Oued El Alenda has a hot desert climate (Köppen climate classification BWh), with very hot summers and mild winters. Rainfall is light and sporadic, and summers are particularly dry.

== Education ==
4.3% of the population has a tertiary education, and another 13.0% has completed secondary education. The overall literacy rate is 75.5%, and is 83.2% among males and 67.2% among females.

== Localities ==
The commune of Oued El Alenda is composed of seven localities:

- Oued El Alenda Sud
- Oued El Alenda Nord
- Chégamat
- Mih El Ghazala
- Dabadib
- Khobna
- Safra
