= Baadj =

- Village
- Location within Algeria
- Coordinates: 33°24′55″N 5°58′11″E
- Country: Algeria
- Province: El M'Ghair Province
- District: El M'Ghair District
- Commune: Oum Touyour
- Elevation: 64 m (210 ft)
- Time zone: UTC+1 (CET)

Baadj (also known as El Baadj) is a village in the commune of Oum Touyour, in El M'Ghair District, El M'Ghair Province, Algeria. The village is located on the W31 regional road just northwest of where it meets the N3 highway, near Oum Touyour. 13 kilometres (8.1 mi) south of Djamaa.
