= Sidi Slimane, Algeria =

There are multiple places called Sidi Slimane in Algeria:

- Sidi Slimane, El Oued, a village in Bayadha Commune, El Oued Province
- Sidi Slimane, Ouargla, a town in Ouargla Province
- Sidi Slimane, Tissemsilt, a town in Tissemsilt Province
