= Jdeideh, Matn =

Jdeideh جديدة المتن
- City
- Location within Lebanon
- Coordinates: 33°53′0″N 35°34′0″E
- Country: Lebanon
- Governorate: Mount Lebanon Governorate
- District: Matn District

Government
  - Time Zone: GMT +2 (UTC)
  - - Summer (DST): +3 (UTC)
  - Area Code(s): (+961) 1

Area
  - Total: 6 km^{2} (2.3 sq mi)
- Highest elevation: 50 m (160 ft)
- Lowest elevation: 0 m (0 ft)
- Time zone: UTC+2 (EET)
  - Summer (DST): UTC+3 (EEST)
- Dialing code: +961

Jdeideh (Arabic: جديدة المتن, al-Judaydat; also Jdayde, Jdaideh or Jdeidet el-Matn), is a coastal municipality and the administrative capital of the Matn District in the Mount Lebanon Governorate.

Jdeideh has an area of approximately 6 km^{2}. It is located in the northern suburbs of Beirut city that comprise Greater Beirut. The municipality is formed of three villages of Jdeidet el-Matn, Bauchrieh and Sed el Bauchrieh, with a mixed ethnic Armenian and Assyrian population numbering around 160,000 inhabitants. Jdeidet el-Matn has five municipal council members, while Bauchrieh has nine and Sed el Bauchrieh has seven.

Jdeideh is an important industrial zone and a significant location for commercial and banking activity.

== Archaeology ==
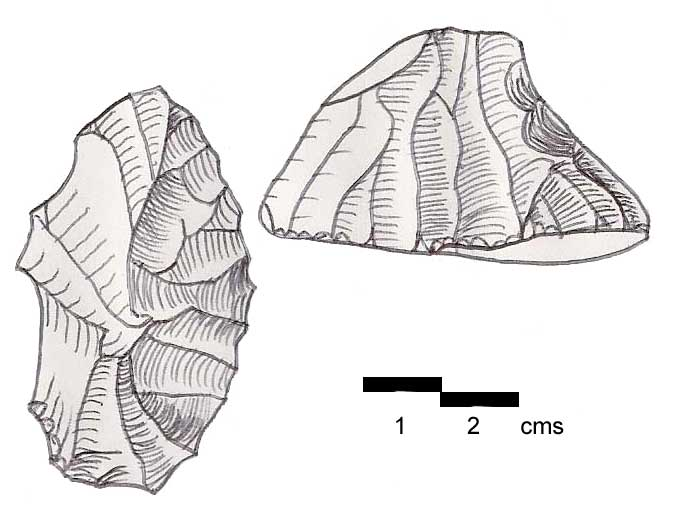
Grattoir de côté. A carinated steep-scraper with a racloir on one of the sides. Found at Jdeideh II, Lebanon. Brown Cretaceous flint

Three archaeological sites were found in the Jdeideh area by Jesuit fathers. Two of these featured finds of Heavy Neolithic flints of the Qaraoun culture.

Jdeideh I is 750 metres (2,460 ft) northeast of the town on the left bank of the Nahr Mout, in fields on a 15 metres (49 ft) contour. It was discovered by Raoul Describes who retrieved knapped tools from several periods including Acheulean, Middle Paleolithic, Upper Paleolithic and Heavy Neolithic. This material is in the Saint Joseph University, Museum of Lebanese Prehistory.

Jdeideh II is 500 metres (1,600 ft) northeast of Tuillerie Medawer (east of Haret ech Cheikh) on low foothills to the left of a descending stream running next to the Aamariyeh road. An Upper Paleolithic assemblage in brown Cretaceous flint was found by Auguste Bergy including a variety of scrapers including a specialist variety also found at Ain Cheikh that were termed Grattoirs de côté.

Jdeideh III is on a wooded hilltop north northwest of Aamariyeh on the southwest slopes that was also found by Bergy. He recovered a Qaraoun culture type, Gigantolithic assemblage of massive choppers, scrapers on flakes and coarse picks.

== Demographics ==
In 2014, Christians made up 76.40% and Muslims made up 23.13% of registered voters in Jdeideh. 43.62% of the voters were Maronite Catholics, 16.48% were Sunni Muslims, 11.56% were Greek Orthodox and 8.65% were Greek Catholics.
