= Haret ech Cheikh =

- City
- Location within Lebanon
- Coordinates: 33°57′26″N 35°39′22″E
- Country: Lebanon
- Governorate: Mount Lebanon Governorate
- District: Matn District

Government
  - Time Zone: GMT +2 (UTC)
  - - Summer (DST): +3 (UTC)
  - Area Code(s): (+961) 1

Area
  - Total: 6 km^{2} (2.3 sq mi)
- Highest elevation: 50 m (160 ft)
- Lowest elevation: 0 m (0 ft)
- Time zone: UTC+2 (EET)
  - Summer (DST): UTC+3 (EEST)
- Dialing code: +961

Haret ech Cheikh (also Haret-Ech-Cheikh), is a municipality in the Matn District in the Mount Lebanon Governorate near Bouchriyeh.

== Archaeology ==
The archaeological site at Haret Ech Cheikh is east of the road between Dekwaneh and Jdeideh, about 50 metres (160 ft) above sea level, on the top of a wooded hill. It was discovered by Paul Bovier-Lapierre and Raoul Describes who suggested it may be a high place. The hilltop has several outcrops of sandstone slabs suggested to be megalithic building foundation or enclosure. The suggested foundations have big stones at the corners that were not securely determined to be prehistoric. Materials collected from the site were Neolithic or Chalcolithic in form and was possibly mixed with that of the adjacent site of Ain Cheikh. Lorraine Copeland and Peter Wescombe collected some fresh, unpatinated flint tools from a position west of the hilltop enclosure where a large amount of factory waste was also found. All material is in the Museum of Lebanese Prehistory, marked with the label "Ain Cheikh". A grandiose villa dominates land covering part of the hill.
