= N'Sigha =

- Village
- Location within Algeria
- Coordinates: 34°0′50″N 5°57′6″E
- Country: Algeria
- Province: El M'Ghair Province
- District: El M'Ghair District
- Commune: El M'Ghair
- Elevation: −18 m (−59 ft)
- Time zone: UTC+1 (CET)

N'Sigha (also written Nessirha or En Nessirha) is a village in the commune of El M'Ghair, in El M'Ghair District, El M'Ghair Province, Algeria. The village is located on the Biskra-Touggourt railway 8 kilometres (5.0 mi) north of El M'Ghair.
