= Taleb Larbi District =

- District
- Location of Taleb Larbi District in El Oued Province
- Coordinates: 33°44′N 7°31′E
- Country: Algeria
- Province: El Oued Province
- Capital: Taleb Larbi

Population (2008)
  - Total: 15,130
- Time zone: UTC+1 (CET)

Taleb Larbi District is a district of El Oued Province, Algeria. As of the 2008 census, it has a population of 15,130. It is the largest district by area, but the smallest by population, in the province. Its three communes have the highest population growth rates in the province.

== Communes ==
Taleb Larbi District consists of three communes:

- Taleb Larbi
- Ben Guecha
- Douar El Ma
