= Kouinine =

Kouinine كوينين
- Commune and town
- Location of Kouinine commune within El Oued Province

- Location of Kouinine within Algeria
- Coordinates: 33°24′N 6°50′E
- Country: Algeria
- Province: El Oued Province
- District: El Oued District
- Elevation: 74 m (243 ft)

Population (2008)
  - Total: 10,076
- Time zone: UTC+1 (CET)

Kouinine (Arabic: آﻮﻳﻨﻴﻦ) is a town and commune in El Oued District, El Oued Province, Algeria. According to the 2008 census it has a population of 10,076, up from 7,571 in 1998, with a population growth rate of 3.0%.

== Climate ==
Kouinine has a hot desert climate (Köppen climate classification BWh), with very hot summers and mild winters. Rainfall is light and sporadic, and summers are particularly dry.

== Transportation ==
Kouinine is on the N48, just 4 kilometres (2.5 mi) from the provincial capital El Oued, of which Kounine forms a part of its urban area . The N48 leads north to Still and eventually Biskra.

== Education ==
7.0% of the population has a tertiary education, and another 23.2% has completed secondary education. The overall literacy rate is 84.9%, and is 90.5% among males and 79.1% among females.

== Localities ==
The commune of Kouinine is composed of two localities:

- Kouinine
- Oumih Bahia
