= Sidi Khellil =

Sidi Khellil ﺳﻴﺪي ﺧﻠﻴﻞ
- Commune and town
- Location of Sidi Khellil commune within El M'Ghair Province

- Location of Sidi Khellil within Algeria
- Coordinates: 33°50′16″N 5°57′32″E
- Country: Algeria
- Province: El M'Ghair Province
- District: El M'Ghair District
- Elevation: 15 m (49 ft)

Population (2008)
  - Total: 6,547
- Time zone: UTC+1 (CET)

Sidi Khellil (Arabic: ﺳﻴﺪي ﺧﻠﻴﻞ) is a town and commune in El M'Ghair District, El M'Ghair Province, Algeria. According to the 2008 census it has a population of 6,547, up from 5,524 in 1998, and an annual growth rate of 1.7%.

== Geography ==
Much of the surrounding land is a sandy desert. However, the area between the town (and the railway) and the N3 highway is occupied by an extensive palm plantation. The endorheic salt lake Chott Felrhir lies about 10 kilometres (6 mi) to the northeast of the town.

== Climate ==
Sidi Khellil has a hot desert climate (Köppen climate classification BWh), with very hot summers and mild winters. Rainfall is light and sporadic, and summers are particularly dry.

== Transportation ==
The Biskra-Touggourt train line passes through the town, but there is no station. The main road near the town is the N3 highway, which connect to Biskra to the north and Touggourt to the east.

== Education ==
4.8% of the population has a tertiary education, and another 15.0% has completed secondary education. The overall literacy rate is 76.9%, and is 85.2% among males and 68.2% among females.

== Localities ==
The commune of Sidi Khellil is composed of two localities:

- Sidi Khelil
- Aïn Cheikh
