= Magrane (surname) =

Magrane is a surname. It is a variant of MacGrane or McGrane, which derives from MagRaighne, which devolves to "Mag" (son of) and "Rayne", a hypocorism of Raghnall or Reginald.

Notable people with the surname include:

- Patrick Byrne Magrane (1852–1933), Irish-American businessman
- Joe Magrane (born 1964), American baseball player and broadcaster
- Shannon Magrane (born 1995), American singer

== See also ==
- McGrane
- McGrann
