= Dendouga =

- Village
- Location within Algeria
- Coordinates: 33°57′40″N 5°58′21″E
- Country: Algeria
- Province: El M'Ghair Province
- District: El M'Ghair District
- Commune: El M'Ghair
- Elevation: −22 m (−72 ft)
- Time zone: UTC+1 (CET)

Dendouga is a village in the commune of El M'Ghair, in El M'Ghair District, El M'Ghair Province, Algeria. The village is 5 kilometres (3.1 mi) east of the town of El M'Ghair, to which it is connected by a local road.
