= Douar El Ma =

Douar El Ma دوار اﻟﻤﺎء
- Commune and town
- Location of Douar El Ma commune within El Oued Province

- Location of Douar El Mar within Algeria
- Coordinates: 33°22′20″N 7°41′10″E
- Country: Algeria
- Province: El Oued Province
- District: Taleb Larbi District
- Elevation: 52 m (171 ft)

Population (2008)
  - Total: 5,543
- Time zone: UTC+1 (CET)

Douar El Ma (Arabic: دوار اﻟﻤﺎء) is a town and commune in Taleb Larbi District, El Oued Province, Algeria, near the border with Tunisia. According to the 2008 census it has a population of 5,543, up from 3,527 in 1998, and an annual growth rate of 4.7%. The town is connected by a local road to Taleb Larbi.

== Climate ==
Douar El Ma has a hot desert climate (Köppen climate classification BWh), with very hot summers and mild winters, and very little precipitation throughout the year.

Climate data for Douar El Ma
Month	Jan	Feb	Mar	Apr	May	Jun	Jul	Aug	Sep	Oct	Nov	Dec	Year
Mean daily maximum °C (°F)	16.8 (62.2)	19.6 (67.3)	23.3 (73.9)	27.5 (81.5)	32.6 (90.7)	36.9 (98.4)	40.6 (105.1)	39.8 (103.6)	35.2 (95.4)	28.8 (83.8)	22.0 (71.6)	16.9 (62.4)	28.3 (83.0)
Daily mean °C (°F)	10.8 (51.4)	13.2 (55.8)	16.5 (61.7)	20.4 (68.7)	25.3 (77.5)	29.8 (85.6)	32.7 (90.9)	32.4 (90.3)	28.5 (83.3)	22.4 (72.3)	15.9 (60.6)	11.2 (52.2)	21.6 (70.9)
Mean daily minimum °C (°F)	4.8 (40.6)	6.9 (44.4)	9.8 (49.6)	13.4 (56.1)	18.1 (64.6)	22.8 (73.0)	24.9 (76.8)	25.0 (77.0)	21.9 (71.4)	16.1 (61.0)	9.9 (49.8)	5.5 (41.9)	14.9 (58.9)
Average precipitation mm (inches)	8 (0.3)	7 (0.3)	11 (0.4)	7 (0.3)	5 (0.2)	2 (0.1)	0 (0)	1 (0.0)	5 (0.2)	7 (0.3)	11 (0.4)	8 (0.3)	72 (2.8)
Source: climate-data.org

== Education ==
1.0% of the population has a tertiary education (the lowest in the province), and another 5.3% has completed secondary education. The overall literacy rate is 45.3%, and is 51.3% among males and 39.2% among females; all three rates are the lowest in the province.

== Localities ==
The commune of Douar El Ma is composed of four localities:

- Douar El Ma
- Mih Naceur
- Bir Romane
- Bir Djedid
