= Hassi Khelifa =

Hassi Khelifa ﺣﺎﺳﻰ ﺧﻠﻴﻔﺔ
- Commune and town
- Location of Hassi Khelifa commune within El Oued Province

- Location of Hassi Khelifa within Algeria
- Coordinates: 33°33′44″N 6°59′25″E
- Country: Algeria
- Province: El Oued Province
- District: Hassi Khelifa District
- Elevation: 48 m (157 ft)

Population (2008)
  - Total: 31,784
- Time zone: UTC+1 (CET)

Hassi Khelifa (Arabic: ﺣﺎﺳﻰ ﺧﻠﻴﻔﺔ) is a town and commune, and capital of Hassi Khelifa District in El Oued Province, Algeria. According to the 2008 census it has a population of 31,784, up from 25,118 in 1998, with an annual growth rate of 2.4%.

== Climate ==
Hassi Khelifa has a hot desert climate (Köppen climate classification BWh), with very hot summers and mild winters, and very little precipitation throughout the year.

Climate data for Hassi Khelifa
Month	Jan	Feb	Mar	Apr	May	Jun	Jul	Aug	Sep	Oct	Nov	Dec	Year
Mean daily maximum °C (°F)	17.0 (62.6)	19.6 (67.3)	23.5 (74.3)	27.9 (82.2)	32.8 (91.0)	37.3 (99.1)	41.1 (106.0)	40.2 (104.4)	35.6 (96.1)	29.0 (84.2)	22.2 (72.0)	17.3 (63.1)	28.6 (83.5)
Daily mean °C (°F)	10.9 (51.6)	13.2 (55.8)	16.6 (61.9)	20.7 (69.3)	25.4 (77.7)	30.1 (86.2)	33.1 (91.6)	32.6 (90.7)	28.7 (83.7)	22.5 (72.5)	16.0 (60.8)	11.5 (52.7)	21.8 (71.2)
Mean daily minimum °C (°F)	4.8 (40.6)	6.8 (44.2)	9.8 (49.6)	13.5 (56.3)	18.0 (64.4)	23.0 (73.4)	25.2 (77.4)	25.0 (77.0)	21.9 (71.4)	16.1 (61.0)	9.9 (49.8)	5.7 (42.3)	15.0 (58.9)
Average precipitation mm (inches)	8 (0.3)	8 (0.3)	11 (0.4)	7 (0.3)	6 (0.2)	2 (0.1)	0 (0)	1 (0.0)	6 (0.2)	8 (0.3)	11 (0.4)	8 (0.3)	76 (2.8)
Source: climate-data.org

== Transportation ==
Hassi Khelifa lies on the N16 highway, 29 kilometres (18 mi) north of El Oued on the way to Tebessa, and the Tunisian border by the N48. From El Oued the N16 continues to Touggourt, and the N48 leads north towards Biskra.

== Education ==
3.6% of the population has a tertiary education, and another 11.9% has completed secondary education. The overall literacy rate is 72.0%, and is 78.0% among males and 65.8% among females.

== Localities ==
The commune of Hassi Khelifa is composed of 11 localities:

- Hassi Khelifa
- Menchia
- Nezla Cherguia
- Hamaïssa
- Chouaïha
- Amra
- Merzaka
- Khalaïfa
- Nessaïba
- Sahanberry
- Nezla Gherbia
