= Taleb Larbi =

Taleb Larbi ﻃﺎﻟﺐ اﻟﻌﺮﺑﻲ
- Commune and town
- Location of Taleb Larbi commune within El Oued Province

- Location of Taleb Larbi within Algeria
- Coordinates: 33°43′39″N 7°31′2″E
- Country: Algeria
- Province: El Oued Province
- District: Taleb Larbi District
- Elevation: 42 m (138 ft)

Population (2008)
  - Total: 7,074
- Time zone: UTC+1 (CET)

Taleb Larbi (Arabic: ﻃﺎﻟﺐ اﻟﻌﺮﺑﻲ) is a town and commune, and capital of Taleb Larbi District, El Oued Province, Algeria. According to the 2008 census it has a population of 7,074, up from 3,582 in 1998, with an annual of growth rate of 7.2% per year, the second highest in the province.

== Transportation ==
Taleb Larbi is just 5 kilometres (3.1 mi) from the border with Tunisia along the N48. To the west, the N48 meets the N16, which leads west to El Oued and Touggourt and north to Tébessa.

== Climate ==
Taleb Larbi has a hot desert climate (Köppen climate classification BWh), with very hot summers and mild winters, and very little precipitation throughout the year.

Climate data for Taleb Larbi
Month	Jan	Feb	Mar	Apr	May	Jun	Jul	Aug	Sep	Oct	Nov	Dec	Year
Mean daily maximum °C (°F)	16.7 (62.1)	19.4 (66.9)	23.1 (73.6)	27.1 (80.8)	32.2 (90.0)	36.5 (97.7)	40.2 (104.4)	39.4 (102.9)	34.6 (94.3)	28.6 (83.5)	21.8 (71.2)	16.8 (62.2)	28.0 (82.5)
Daily mean °C (°F)	10.8 (51.4)	13.2 (55.8)	16.4 (61.5)	20.1 (68.2)	24.9 (76.8)	29.5 (85.1)	32.4 (90.3)	32.0 (89.6)	28.1 (82.6)	22.3 (72.1)	15.9 (60.6)	11.2 (52.2)	21.4 (70.5)
Mean daily minimum °C (°F)	4.9 (40.8)	7.0 (44.6)	9.7 (49.5)	13.2 (55.8)	17.7 (63.9)	22.6 (72.7)	24.7 (76.5)	24.7 (76.5)	21.6 (70.9)	16.0 (60.8)	10.0 (50.0)	5.7 (42.3)	14.8 (58.7)
Average precipitation mm (inches)	9 (0.4)	8 (0.3)	12 (0.5)	9 (0.4)	6 (0.2)	3 (0.1)	0 (0)	2 (0.1)	7 (0.3)	9 (0.4)	12 (0.5)	8 (0.3)	85 (3.5)
Source: climate-data.org

== Education ==
1.6% of the population has a tertiary education (the second lowest rate in the province), and another 18.2% has completed secondary education. The overall literacy rate is 61.6%, and is 68.9% among males and 53.0% among females.

== Localities ==
The commune of Taleb Larbi is composed of 12 localities:

- Taleb Larbi
- Nakhlat El Mengoub
- Hniche
- Lemdjebès
- Si Mebarek
- Zeïdi
- Garet Ettir
- Laouabed
- Maleh El Hadj Ahmed
- Gour Djouali
- Bouras
- Sagaa
