= McGrane =

McGrane is an Irish surname derived from the Mag Raighne Gaelic Sept that was mainly located in the Province of Leinster and in the Counties of Dublin and Louth in particular. It is also found in Ulster where the variant MacGrann is more prevalent.

== List of notable people with the surname McGrane ==
- Bernard McGrane, American sociologist
- Damien McGrane, Irish golfer
- Dave McGrane, Canadian professor
- Dennis McGrane, American Olympic Ski-jumper (1984 and 1988 Olympics)
- Dermot McGrane, English football coach
- Gail McGrane, Scottish reporter
- Ian McGrane, American soccer player
- John McGrane, Canadian soccer player
- Karen McGrane, American content strategist
- Michelle McGrane, Zimbabwean poet
- Paul McGrane, Irish Gaelic footballer
- Phil McGrane, American politician
- Seamus McGrane, Irish dissident republican and leader
- Tomás McGrane, Irish hurler
- Tony McGrane, Australian politician
- Thomas McGrane, Irish karate master

== See also ==
- Magrane (surname)
- McGrann
