= Robbah District =

- District
- Location of Robbah District in El Oued Province
- Coordinates: 33°16′N 6°55′E
- Country: Algeria
- Province: El Oued Province
- Capital: Robbah

Population (2008)
  - Total: 40,719
- Time zone: UTC+1 (CET)

Robbah is a district in El Oued Province, Algeria. As of the 2008 census, it has a population of 40,719.

Robbah District is situated 10 kilometres (6.2 mi) south of the capital of the wilaya, El Oued. Robbah is a major town in the district. It is surrounded by some small villages such as El Khobna, Nakhla, El Aquila and El Ogla. These villages are widely known for agriculture and animal breeding. Most people in this district are Arabs, coming from the Arab peninsula.

== Communes ==
Robbah District consists of three communes:

- Robbah
- Nakhla
- El Ogla
