= Magrane, Algeria =

Magrane ﻣﻘﺮن
- Commune and town
- Location of Magrane commune within El Oued Province

- Location of Magrane within Algeria
- Coordinates: 33°35′N 6°57′E
- Country: Algeria
- Province: El Oued Province
- District: Magrane District
- Elevation: 46 m (151 ft)

Population (2008)
  - Total: 24,577
- Time zone: UTC+1 (CET)

Magrane (Arabic: ﻣﻘﺮن) is a town and commune, and capital of Magrane District, in El Oued Province, Algeria. According to the 2008 census it has a population of 24,577, up from 20,102 in 1998, with an annual growth rate of 2.1%.

== Climate ==
Magrane has a hot desert climate (Köppen climate classification BWh), with very hot summers and mild winters. Rainfall is light and sporadic, and summers are particularly dry.

== Education ==
3.9% of the population has a tertiary education, and another 11.1% has completed secondary education. The overall literacy rate is 77.8%, and is 84.2% among males and 70.9% among females.

== Localities ==
The commune of Magrane is composed of nine localities:

- Magrane
- Hamadine
- Menanaa
- Oum Zbed
- Bellila
- Layaaïcha
- Gottaï
- Ladhaya
- Lekhsime
