= El Oued District =

- District
- Location of El Oued District in El Oued Province
- Coordinates: 33°27′N 7°11′E
- Country: Algeria
- Province: El Oued Province
- Capital: El Oued

Population (2008)
  - Total: 144,775
- Time zone: UTC+1 (CET)

El Oued District is a district of El Oued Province, Algeria. As of the 2008 census, it has a population of 144,775.

== Communes ==
El Oued District consists of two communes:

- El Oued
- Kouinine
