= Guemar Airport =

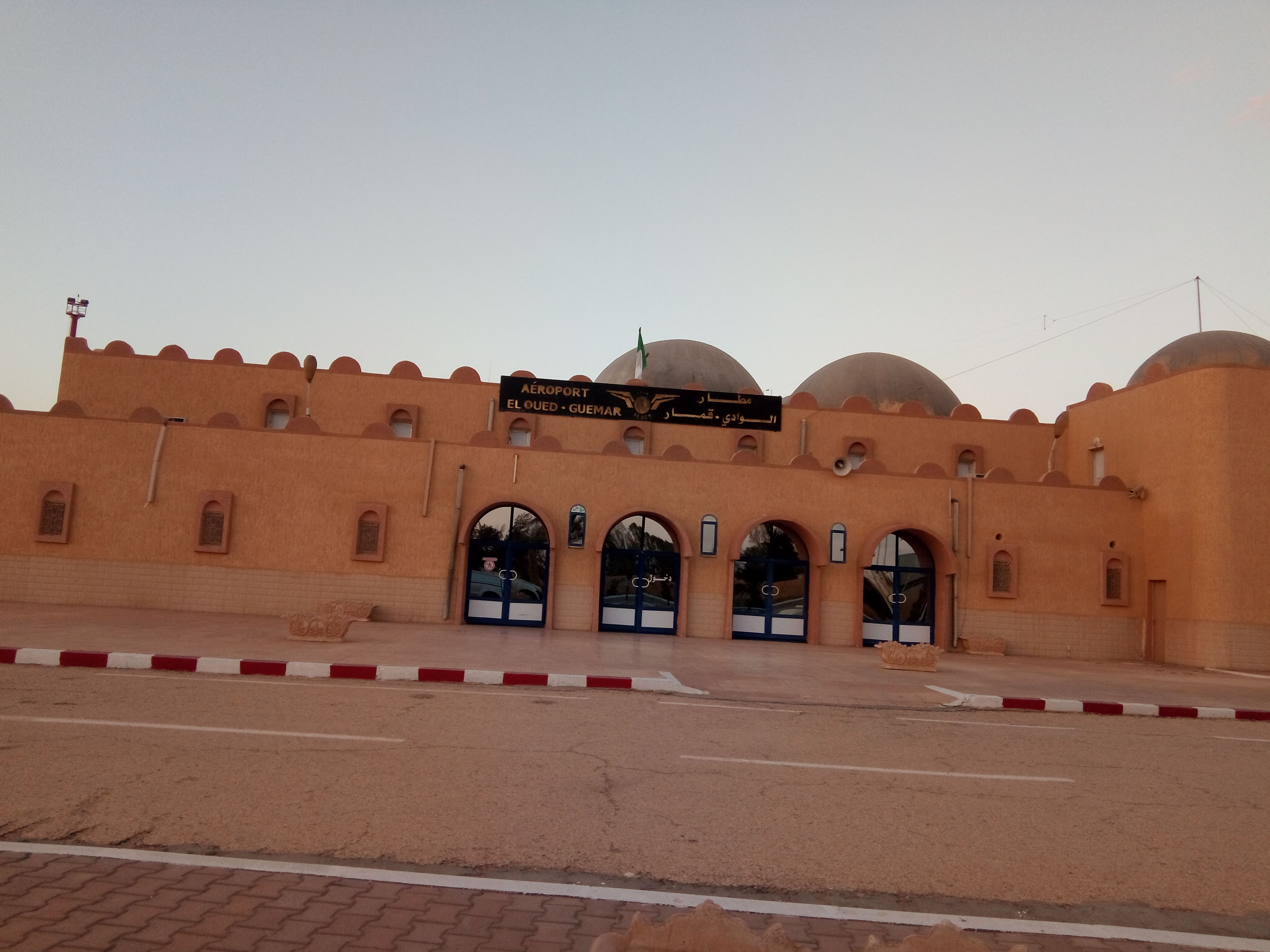
- IATA: ELU; ICAO: DAUO

Summary
- Operator: Government
- Serves: El Oued, Algeria
- Location: Guemar, Algeria
- Elevation AMSL: 62 m (203 ft)
- Coordinates: 33°30′46″N 6°46′57″E

Map
- Location of airport in Algeria

Runways
Direction	Length		Surface
Direction	m	ft	Surface
13/31	3,000	9,843	Asphalt
02/20	2,000	6,562	Asphalt
- Source： Algerian AIP Landings.com

Guemar Airport is the airport for El Oued, Algeria (IATA: ELU, ICAO: DAUO). Located near the community of Guemar, it lies about 20 kilometres north of El Oued.

Opened to civil aviation since 1955. The airport has two runways 1) Runway 13/31 is 3000 x 45 2) Runway 02/20 is 2000 x 30
