= Guemar District =

- District
- Location of Guemar District in El Oued Province
- Coordinates: 33°30′N 6°50′E
- Country: Algeria
- Province: El Oued Province
- Capital: Guemar

Population (2008)
  - Total: 99,592
- Time zone: UTC+1 (CET)

Guemar District is a district of El Oued Province, Algeria. As of the 2008 census, it has a population of 99,592.

== Communes ==
Bayadha District consists of three communes:

- Guemar
- Ourmes
- Taghzout
