= Aïn Cheikh =

- Village
- Location within Algeria
- Coordinates: 33°52′43″N 5°59′2″E
- Country: Algeria
- Province: El M'Ghair Province
- District: El M'Ghair District
- Commune: Sidi Khellil
- Elevation: 1 m (3.3 ft)
- Time zone: UTC+1 (CET)

Aïn Cheikh is a village in the commune of Sidi Khellil, in El M'Ghair District, El M'Ghair Province, Algeria. The village is located to the east of the N3 highway about 9 kilometres (5.6 mi) southeast of El M'Ghair.
