= El M'Ghair =

El M'Ghair اﻟﻤﻐﻴﺮ
- Commune and town
- Location of El M'Ghair commune within El M'Ghair Province

- Location of El M'Ghair within Algeria
- Coordinates: 33°57′2″N 5°55′27″E
- Country: Algeria
- Province: El M'Ghair Province
- District: El M'Ghair District
- Elevation: 2 m (6.6 ft)

Population (2008)
  - Total: 49,793
- Time zone: UTC+1 (CET)

El M'Ghair (Arabic: اﻟﻤﻐﻴﺮ), also called El Meghaïer or Mhraïer, is a town and commune, and capital of El M'Ghair District and El M'Ghair Province, Algeria. According to the 1998 census it has a population of 49,793, up from 40,228 in 1998, and is the second largest town in the province after Djamaa. Its annual population growth rate is 2.2%.

== Geography ==
El M'Ghair lies southwest of Chott Felrhir, a large endorheic salt lake. Between the town and the lake there is an extensive palm plantation.

== Climate ==
El M'Ghair has a hot desert climate (Köppen climate classification BWh), with very hot summers and mild winters, and very little precipitation throughout the year.

Climate data for El M'Ghair
Month	Jan	Feb	Mar	Apr	May	Jun	Jul	Aug	Sep	Oct	Nov	Dec	Year
Mean daily maximum °C (°F)	16.9 (62.4)	19.4 (66.9)	23.5 (74.3)	28.0 (82.4)	33.3 (91.9)	38.0 (100.4)	41.5 (106.7)	40.7 (105.3)	35.4 (95.7)	28.9 (84.0)	22.1 (71.8)	17.6 (63.7)	28.8 (83.8)
Daily mean °C (°F)	10.9 (51.6)	13.3 (55.9)	16.8 (62.2)	20.8 (69.4)	25.9 (78.6)	30.8 (87.4)	33.8 (92.8)	33.3 (91.9)	28.7 (83.7)	22.5 (72.5)	16.2 (61.2)	11.9 (53.4)	22.1 (71.7)
Mean daily minimum °C (°F)	5.0 (41.0)	7.2 (45.0)	10.1 (50.2)	13.7 (56.7)	18.5 (65.3)	23.7 (74.7)	26.1 (79.0)	25.9 (78.6)	22.1 (71.8)	16.2 (61.2)	10.3 (50.5)	6.2 (43.2)	15.4 (59.8)
Average precipitation mm (inches)	8 (0.3)	5 (0.2)	12 (0.5)	9 (0.4)	7 (0.3)	1 (0.0)	0 (0)	2 (0.1)	9 (0.4)	12 (0.5)	12 (0.5)	10 (0.4)	87 (3.6)
Source: climate-data.org

== Transportation ==
El M'Ghair has a station on the Biskra-Touggourt railway line, which passes by the east side of the city. The N3 highway, which also connects Biskra to the north with Touggourt to the south, also passes through the city on the west side.

== Education ==
5.4% of the population has a tertiary education, and another 18.0% has completed secondary education. The overall literacy rate is 77.4%, and is 83.4% among males and 73.4% among females.

== Notable buildings ==
There are two mosques in the town; Mosque Akbar in the centre of the city and Mosque Atik to the west near the highway.

== Localities ==
The commune of El M'Ghair is composed of four localities:

- M'Gaïer
- Dendouga
- N'Sigha
- Zérig
