= Hassi Khelifa District =

- District
- Location of Hassi Khelifa District in El Oued Province
- Coordinates: 33°35′N 7°0′E
- Country: Algeria
- Province: El Oued Province
- Capital: Hassi Khelifa

Population (2008)
  - Total: 40,041
- Time zone: UTC+1 (CET)

Hassi Khelifa District is a district of El Oued Province, Algeria. As of the 2008 census, it has a population of 40,041.

== Communes ==
Hassi Khelifa District consists of two communes:

- Hassi Khelifa
- Trifaoui
