= Debila =

Debila اﻟﺪﺑﻴﻠﺔ
- Commune and town
- Location of Debila commune within El Oued Province

- Location of Debila within Algeria
- Coordinates: 33°30′23″N 6°56′17″E
- Country: Algeria
- Province: El Oued Province
- District: Debila District
- Elevation: 58 m (190 ft)

Population (2008)
  - Total: 25,158
- Time zone: UTC+1 (CET)

Debila (Arabic: اﻟﺪﺑﻴﻠﺔ) is a town, commune, and also the capital of Debila District. It is in El Oued Province, Algeria. According to the 2008 census, it had a population of 25,158, up from 20,088 in 1998, and an annual growth rate of 2.3%.

== Climate ==
Debila has a hot desert climate (Köppen climate classification BWh), with very hot summers and mild winters. Rainfall is light and sporadic, and summers are particularly dry.

== Transportation ==
Debila lies on the N16 highway, 20 kilometres (12 mi) north of El Oued on the way to Tebessa, and the Tunisian border by the N48. From El Oued the N16 continues to Touggourt, and the N48 leads north towards Biskra.

== Education ==
6.5% of the population has a tertiary education, and another 16.1% has completed secondary education. The overall literacy rate is 74.9%, and is 81.8% among males and 67.8% among females.

== Localities ==
The commune of Debila is composed of six localities:

- Débila
- Akfadou
- Drimini
- Djedeïda
- Chenaïba
- Djamaa Mida
