= Robbah =

Robbah رﺑﺎح
- Commune and town
- Location of Robbah commune within El Oued Province

- Location of Robbah within Algeria
- Coordinates: 33°16′52″N 6°54′39″E
- Country: Algeria
- Province: El Oued Province
- District: Robbah District
- Elevation: 87 m (285 ft)

Population (2008)
  - Total: 21,965
- Time zone: UTC+1 (CET)

Robbah (Arabic: رﺑﺎح) is a town and commune, and capital of Robbah District, in El Oued Province, Algeria. According to the 2008 census it has a population of 21,965, up from 17,243 in 1998, and an annual growth rate of 2.5%. The town lies about 10 kilometres (6.2 mi) southeast of the provincial capital El Oued and forms a part of its larger urban area.

== Climate ==
Robbah has a hot desert climate (Köppen climate classification BWh), with very hot summers and mild winters. Rainfall is light and sporadic, and summers are particularly dry.

== Education ==
7.2% of the population has a tertiary education, and another 16.4% has completed secondary education. The overall literacy rate is 79.6%, and is 87.3% among males and 71.6% among females.

== Localities ==
The commune of Robbah is composed of four localities:

- Robbah
- Débidibi
- Beghazlia
- Guédachi
