= Molly McGrann =

American poet

- Born: United States
- Education: Skidmore College; New York University (MFA)
- Occupations: Literary Editor; Novelist; Poet
- Writing career
- Period: 1998–present

Molly McGrann is an American literary critic, poet, and novelist. She is an alumna of Skidmore College and New York University. She lives in England.

== Biography ==
McGrann graduated from Skidmore College in 1995, and received an MFA in Creative Writing from New York University. She is a literary critic and the author of two novels.

In December 1998, McGrann married the Radiohead bassist Colin Greenwood in Oxford, England. They live in a village in Oxfordshire with their three sons, Jesse, Asa and Henry.

== Writing ==
McGrann has worked as a reviewer for the Times Literary Supplement and as a contributing editor for The Paris Review. She has also had poems published in various literary magazines including TriQuarterly and Arion. She is a London Editor of A Public Space, a quarterly literary magazine, founded in 2005 by Brigid Hughes, former Executive Editor of The Paris Review.

Her first novel, 360 Flip, looked at the tensions lying below the surface of the "American Dream" in a 60s Levittown-style suburb, through the eyes of a disillusioned young poet growing up there in the 1950s. It was dedicated to her husband.

Exurbia, McGrann's second novel, set in Los Angeles in the mid 80s during the Reagan era, is about the mentally ill living in the margins of society. It follows an insecure thirteen-year-old girl suffering from bipolar disorder, Lise, and the parallel story of Ed Valencia, as their lives become entangled with the violent world of L.A.'s homeless gangs. It was dedicated to her parents.

== Works ==
=== Fiction ===
- 360 Flip (2004)
- Exurbia (2007)
- The Ladies of the House (2015)

=== Poetry ===
- "From Less Than Spring, a long poem of conditions". TriQuarterly. September 22, 1999. Archived from the original on May 16, 2011 – via HighBeam Research.
- Hermaphroditus (2002)
