= Magrane District =

- District
- Location of Magrane District in El Oued Province
- Coordinates: 33°35′N 6°57′E
- Country: Algeria
- Province: El Oued Province
- Capital: Magrane

Population (2008)
  - Total: 36,812
- Time zone: UTC+1 (CET)

Magrane District is a district of El Oued Province, Algeria. As of the 2008 census, it has a population of 36,812.

== Communes ==
Magrane District consists of two communes:

- Magrane
- Sidi Aoun
