= Bayadha District =

- District
- Location of Bayadha District in El Oued Province
- Coordinates: 33°20′N 6°55′E
- Country: Algeria
- Province: El Oued Province
- Capital: Bayadha

Population (2008)
  - Total: 32,926
- Time zone: UTC+1 (CET)

Bayadha District is a district of El Oued Province, Algeria. As of the 2008 census, it has a population of 32,926.

== Communes ==
Bayadha District consists of one commune:

- Bayadha
