= Guemar =

Guemar ﻗﻤﺎر
- Commune and town
- Location of Guemar commune within El Oued Province

- Location of Guemar within Algeria
- Coordinates: 33°30′N 6°50′E
- Country: Algeria
- Province: El Oued Province
- District: Guemar District
- Elevation: 63 m (207 ft)

Population (2008)
  - Total: 39,168
- Time zone: UTC+1 (CET)

Guemar (Arabic: ﻗﻤﺎر) is a Saharan oasis town in Algeria near the Tunisian border, in the Oued Souf area of the El Oued Province, about 20 km north of El Oued. It includes a zaouia and a border post. According to the 2008 census it has a population of 39,168, up from 29,185 in 1998, with an annual growth rate of 3.0%.

== Climate ==
Guemar has a hot desert climate (Köppen climate classification BWh), with very hot summers and mild winters. Rainfall is light and sporadic, and summers are particularly dry.

== Transportation ==
Guemar lies on the N48 highway from El Oued to Still and then Biskra via the N3. The town is served by Guemar Airport.

== Education ==
8.5% of the population has a tertiary education (the highest in the province), and another 15.5% has completed secondary education. The overall literacy rate is 78.5%, and is 85.5% among males and 71.4% among females.

== Localities ==
The commune of Guemar is composed of 13 localities:

- Guemar
- Gharbia
- Erg Souari Ghamra
- El Houd
- Ghamra Sud
- Ghamra Centre
- Ghamra Nord
- Gour Debaa
- Miha Khalifa
- Demitha
- Miha Salah
- Djedeïda
- Mih Atla
