= El M'Ghair District =

- District
- Location of El M'Ghair District in former El Oued Province
- Coordinates: 33°57′N 5°55′E
- Country: Algeria
- Province: El M'Ghair Province
- Capital: El M'Ghair

Population (2008)
  - Total: 72,387
- Time zone: UTC+1 (CET)

El M'Ghair District (also written El Meghaier District) is a district of El M'Ghair Province, Algeria. As of the 2008 census, it has a population of 72,387.

== Communes ==
El M'Ghair District consists of four communes:

- El M'Ghair
- Oum Touyour
- Sidi Khellil
- Still
