= Reguiba District =

- District
- Location of Reguiba District in El Oued Province
- Coordinates: 33°34′N 6°43′E
- Country: Algeria
- Province: El Oued Province
- Capital: Reguiba

Population (2008)
  - Total: 45,539
- Time zone: UTC+1 (CET)

Reguiba District is a district of El Oued Province, Algeria. At the 2008 census, it had a population of 45,539.

== Communes ==
Reguiba District consists of two communes:

- Reguiba
- Hamraia
