= Debila District =

- District
- Location of Debila District within El Oued Province
- Coordinates: 33°31′N 6°57′E
- Country: Algeria
- Province: El Oued Province
- Capital: Debila

Population (2008)
  - Total: 47,913
- Time zone: UTC+1 (CET)

Debila District is a district of El Oued Province, Algeria. As of the 2008 census, it has a population of 47,913.

== Communes ==
Debila District consists of two communes:

- Debila
- Hassani Abdelkrim
