= Still, El M'Ghair =

Still ﺳﻄﻴﻞ
- Commune and town
- Location of Still commune within El M'Ghair Province

- Location of Still within Algeria
- Coordinates: 34°15′N 5°55′E
- Country: Algeria
- Province: El M'Ghair Province
- District: El M'Ghair District
- Elevation: 13 m (43 ft)

Population (2008)
  - Total: 4,978
- Time zone: UTC+1 (CET)

Still (Arabic: ﺳﻄﻴﻞ) (sometimes written Stile) is a town and commune in El M'Ghair District, El M'Ghair Province, Algeria. According to the 2008 census it has a population of 4,978, up from 3,545 in 1998, and an annual growth rate of 3.5%.

== Climate ==
Still has a hot desert climate (Köppen climate classification BWh), with very hot summers and mild winters. Rainfall is light and sporadic, and summers are particularly dry.

== Transportation ==
Still is on the N3 which connects Biskra in the north to Touggourt in the south. The N48 leaves the N3 just south of Still, leading southeast to El Oued.

== Education ==
3.6% of the population has a tertiary education, and another 14.7% has completed secondary education. The overall literacy rate is 69.0%, and is 77.3% among males and 60.2% among females.

== Localities ==
The commune of Still is composed of one locality: Home of CFL Bust QB Josh Struver

- Still
