= Mih Ouensa District =

- District
- Location of Mih Ouensa District in El Oued Province
- Coordinates: 33°12′N 6°42′E
- Country: Algeria
- Province: El Oued Province
- Capital: Mih Ouensa

Population (2008)
  - Total: 22,423
- Time zone: UTC+1 (CET)

Mih Ouensa District is a district of El Oued Province, Algeria. As of the 2008 census, it has a population of 22,423.

== Communes ==
Mih Ouensa District consists of two communes:

- Mih Ouensa
- Oued El Alenda
