= El Oued Province =

Province of Algeria

El Oued Province ولاية الوادي
- Province
- Map of Algeria highlighting El Oued
- Coordinates: 33°7′N 7°11′E
- Country: Algeria
- Capital: El Oued

Government
  - Wāli: Larbi Bahloul

Area
  - Total: 54,573 km^{2} (21,071 sq mi)

Population (2008)
  - Total: 673,934
  - Density: 12.349/km^{2} (31.984/sq mi)
- Time zone: UTC+01 (CET)
- Area Code: +213 (0) 32
- ISO 3166 code: DZ-39
- Districts: 12
- Municipalities: 30

El Oued (Arabic: ولاية الوادي, Berber languages: ⴻⵍ oⵓⴻⴷ) is a Saharan province of Algeria (n° 39) dominated by Oued Souf. It was named after its eponymous capital. Notable towns include El Oued itself and Guemar.

== Geography ==
=== Physical geography ===
El Oued Province lies in the Sahara desert in northeast Algeria. The mostly uninhabited southern half of the province is covered by the Grand Erg Oriental, a vast region of uninterrupted sand dunes. The northern half of the province is a mixture of sandy desert with scarce vegetation, scattered oases, and salt lakes. The most notable oases are the Oued Souf region, upon which the capital El Oued and neighbouring towns are built, as well as oases located near the towns of El M'Ghair and Djamaa, both of which support extensive palm plantations. Chott Melrhir, a large endorheic salt lake, lies in the north-central part of the province, while Chott Felrhir is a smaller salt lake to its southwest, near El M'Ghair. These salt lakes, and the surrounding areas, lie as much as 30 metres (98 ft) below sea level; nearby towns and villages including Hamraia, Méguibra, Dendouga and Aïn Cheikh are also below sea level.

=== Climate ===
El Oued Province experiences a hot desert climate. Winters are mild, with average temperatures around 11 °C (52 °F) in January, but summers are hot with average temperatures around 32 °C (90 °F), average maxima around 40 °C (104 °F) and the hottest days approaching 50 °C (122 °F). Precipitation is very low throughout the province, but somewhat more rain does fall in the north, particularly during the winter and adjacent months.

=== Neighbouring districts ===
El Oued Province is bordered to the northeast by Tébessa Province, to the north by Khenchela Province, to the northwest by Biskra Province, to the west by El M'Ghair Province to the south and southwest by Ouargla Province, to the southeast by Tunisia's Tataouine Governorate, and to the east by Tunisia's Tozeur and Kebili Governorates.

== History ==
The province was created from Biskra Province in 1984.

== Administrative divisions ==
The province is made up of 10 districts, which are divided into 22 communes or municipalities.

=== Districts ===
1. Bayadha
2. Debila
3. El Oued
4. Guemar
5. Hassi Khelifa
6. Magrane
7. Mih Ouensa
8. Reguiba
9. Robbah
10. Taleb Larbi

=== Communes ===
1. Bayadha
2. Ben Guecha
3. Debila
4. Douar El Ma
5. El Ogla
6. El Oued
7. Guemar
8. Hamraia
9. Hassani Abdelkrim
10. Hassi Khelifa
11. Kouinine
12. Magrane
13. Mih Ouensa
14. Nakhla
15. Oued El Alenda
16. Ourmes
17. Reguiba
18. Robbah
19. Sidi Aoun
20. Taghzout
21. Taleb Larbi
22. Trifaoui
