= El Oued =

El Oued اﻟﻮادي
- City
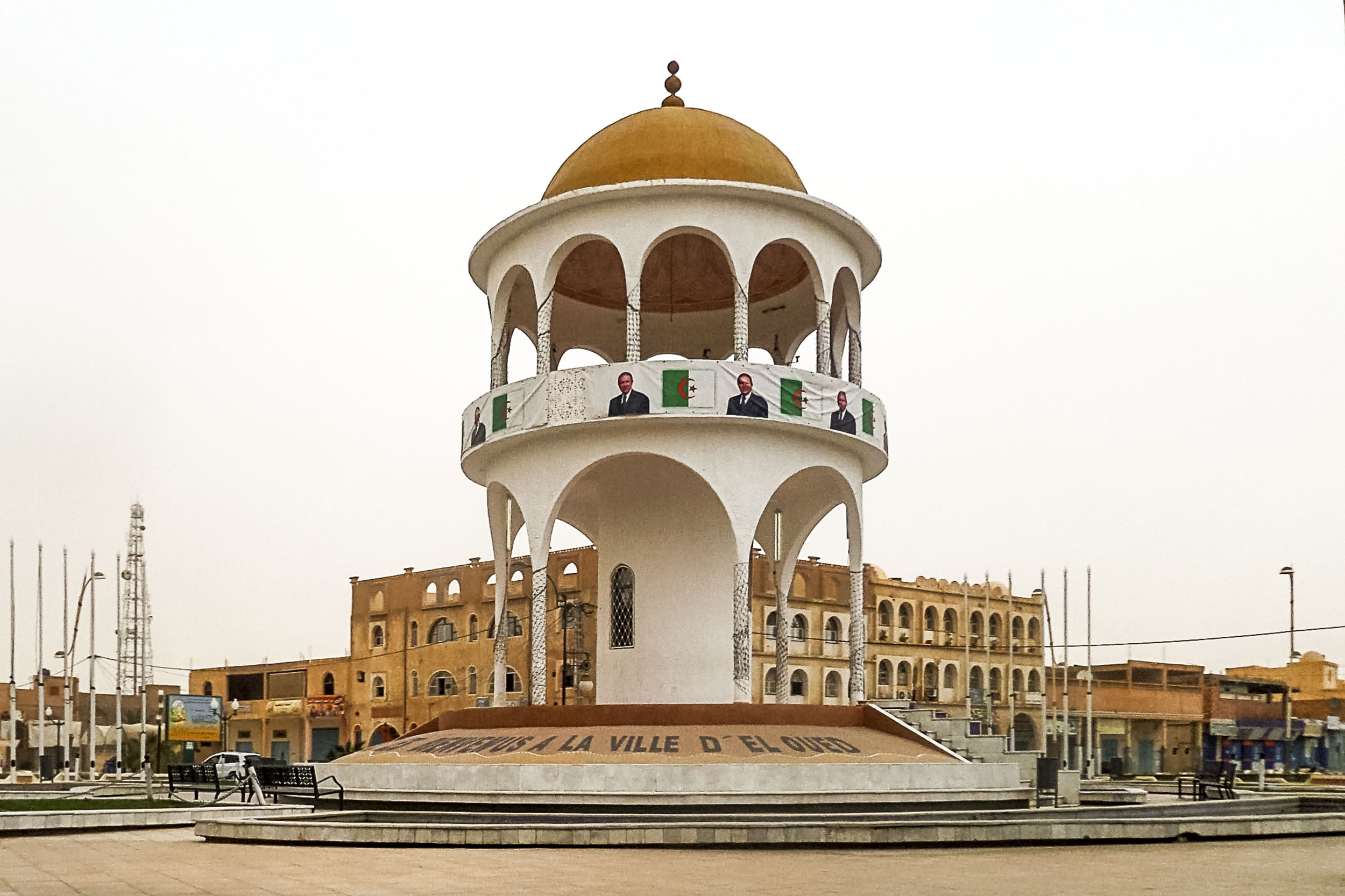

- Location of El Oued Commune within El Oued Province

- Location of El Oued within Algeria
- Coordinates: 33°21′40″N 6°51′38″E
- Country: Algeria
- Province: El Oued Province
- District: El Oued District

Area
  - Total: 77.0 km^{2} (29.7 sq mi)
- Elevation: 76 m (249 ft)

Population (2008)
  - Total: 134,699
  - Density: 1,750/km^{2} (4,530/sq mi)
- Time zone: UTC+1 (CET)

El Oued (Arabic: اﻟﻮادي, romanized: al-Wādī), Souf or Oued Souf is a city, and the capital of El Oued Province, in Algeria. The oasis town is watered by an underground river, hence its name is El Oued which enables date palm cultivation and the rare use (for the desert) of brick construction for housing. As most roofs are domed, it is known as the "City of a Thousand Domes".

El Oued is located 400 miles (640 km) south east of Algiers (the capital city of Algeria), near the Tunisian border. The population of El Oued was 134,699 as of the 2008 census, up from 105,256 in 1998, with a population growth rate of 2.5%.

== History ==
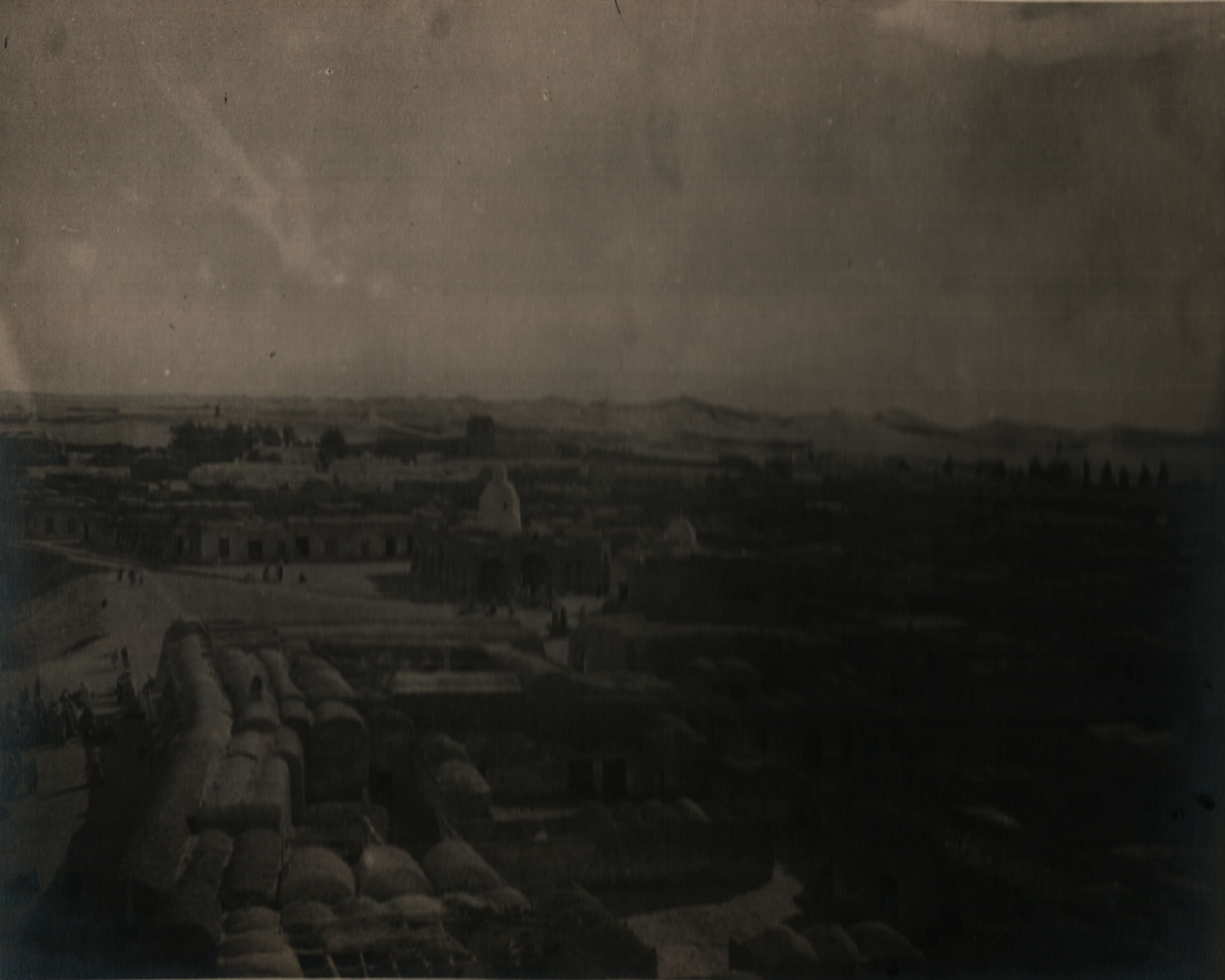
El Oued in January 1913

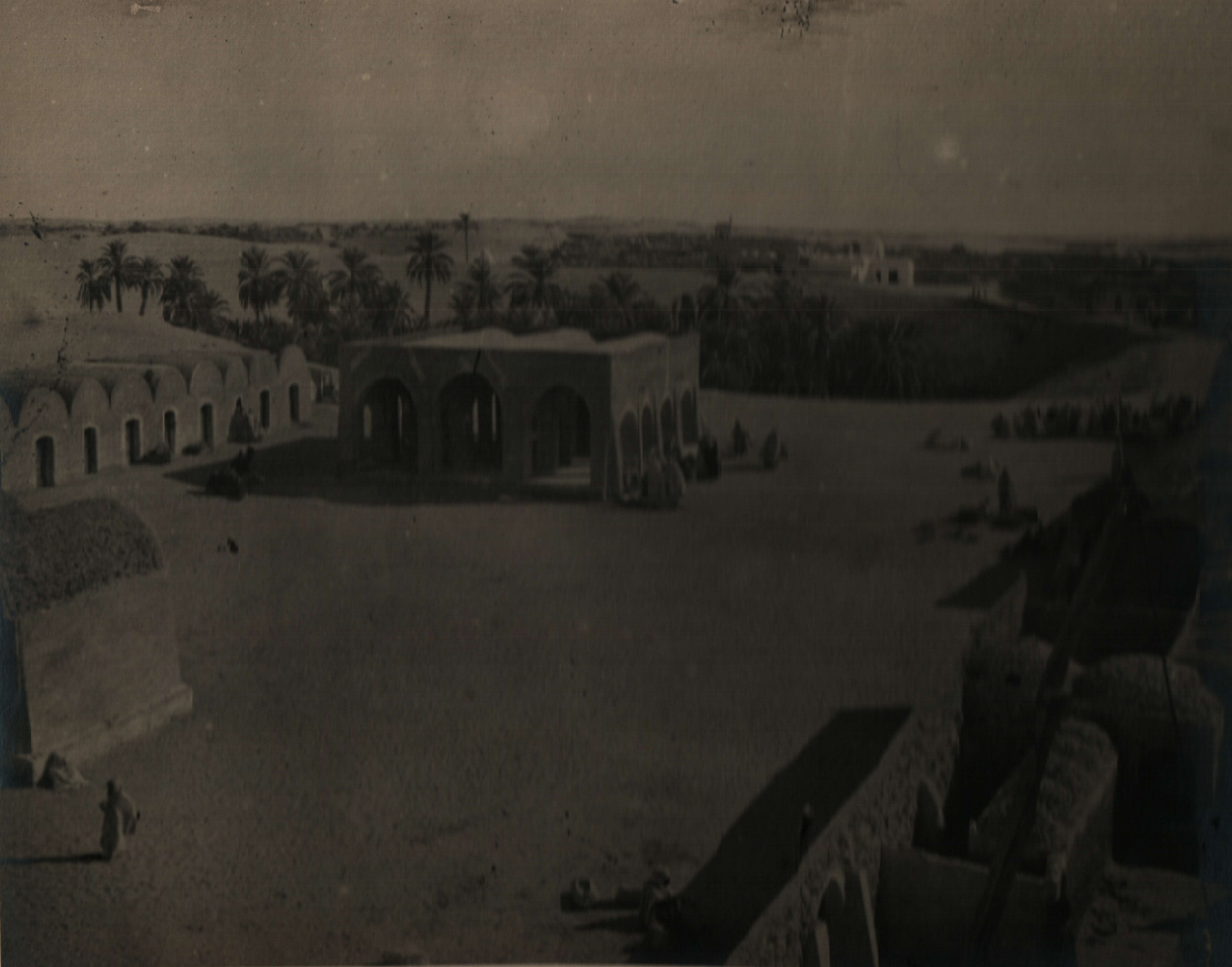
El Oued bazaar in January 1913

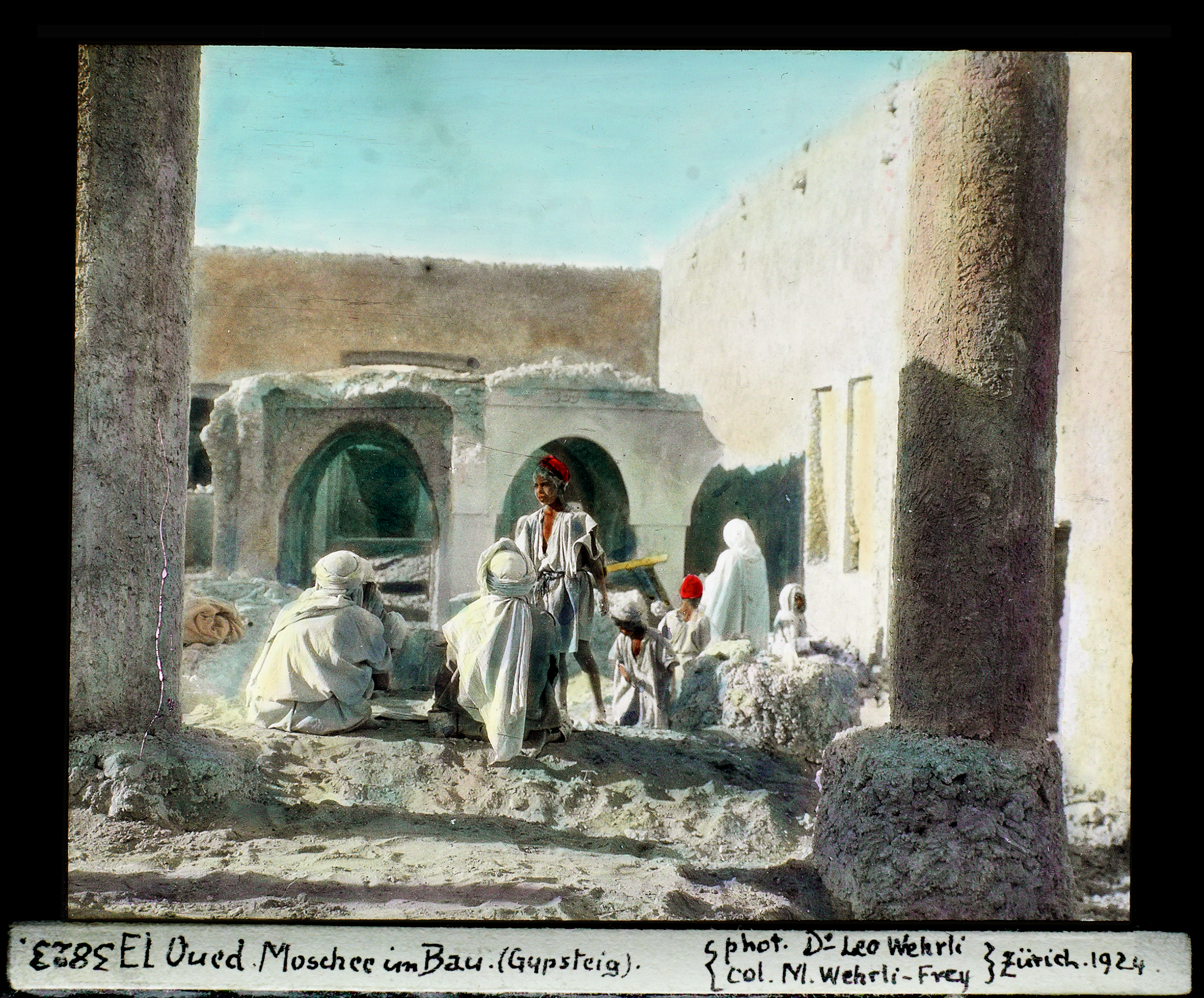
Inabitants of El Oued at the start of the 20th Century

In the 11th century, the Fatimids sent Banu Hilal to the Tripolitania, Tunisia and Constantine areas to fight against the Zirids.

== Culture ==
The inhabitants belong to Teroud tribe (Arabic: بنو طرود) living in and near Oued Souf area.

== Climate ==
El Oued has a hot desert climate (Köppen climate classification BWh), with very hot summers and mild winters. Rainfall is light and sporadic, and summers are particularly dry.

Climate data for El Oued (1991-2020)
Month	Jan	Feb	Mar	Apr	May	Jun	Jul	Aug	Sep	Oct	Nov	Dec	Year
Record high °C (°F)	29.4 (84.9)	35.5 (95.9)	40.0 (104.0)	42.8 (109.0)	45.6 (114.1)	48.7 (119.7)	49.7 (121.5)	48.8 (119.8)	46.0 (114.8)	40.6 (105.1)	34.8 (94.6)	28.2 (82.8)	49.7 (121.5)
Mean maximum °C (°F)	22.1 (71.8)	25.7 (78.3)	31.1 (88.0)	36.2 (97.2)	40.9 (105.6)	45.2 (113.4)	46.8 (116.2)	46.2 (115.2)	42.2 (108.0)	36.3 (97.3)	28.7 (83.7)	22.9 (73.2)	47.47 (117.45)
Mean daily maximum °C (°F)	16.9 (62.4)	19.6 (67.3)	23.5 (74.3)	27.6 (81.7)	32.9 (91.2)	37.9 (100.2)	40.9 (105.6)	40.6 (105.1)	35.3 (95.5)	29.6 (85.3)	22.5 (72.5)	17.7 (63.9)	28.8 (83.7)
Daily mean °C (°F)	11.2 (52.2)	13.4 (56.1)	17.0 (62.6)	20.9 (69.6)	25.8 (78.4)	30.7 (87.3)	33.5 (92.3)	33.4 (92.1)	28.9 (84.0)	23.4 (74.1)	16.7 (62.1)	12.2 (54.0)	22.3 (72.1)
Mean daily minimum °C (°F)	5.5 (41.9)	7.2 (45.0)	10.2 (50.4)	14.3 (57.7)	18.9 (66.0)	23.5 (74.3)	26.2 (79.2)	26.4 (79.5)	22.7 (72.9)	17.2 (63.0)	10.8 (51.4)	6.6 (43.9)	15.8 (60.4)
Mean minimum °C (°F)	1.2 (34.2)	2.5 (36.5)	4.7 (40.5)	8.9 (48.0)	13.2 (55.8)	18.5 (65.3)	22.6 (72.7)	22.8 (73.0)	17.8 (64.0)	11.3 (52.3)	5.2 (41.4)	2.2 (36.0)	0.16 (32.29)
Record low °C (°F)	−6.0 (21.2)	−2.0 (28.4)	−0.1 (31.8)	1.5 (34.7)	5.0 (41.0)	9.0 (48.2)	14.9 (58.8)	14.5 (58.1)	12.0 (53.6)	2.1 (35.8)	0.0 (32.0)	−2.2 (28.0)	−6.0 (21.2)
Average precipitation mm (inches)	19.0 (0.75)	9.9 (0.39)	11.1 (0.44)	20.3 (0.80)	6.7 (0.26)	13.9 (0.55)	0.5 (0.02)	3.6 (0.14)	16.7 (0.66)	10.1 (0.40)	13.8 (0.54)	8.6 (0.34)	134.2 (5.29)
Average precipitation days (≥ 1 mm)	3.7	2.6	3.4	3.1	2.5	2.6	1.8	1.9	3.9	2.9	2.7	3.3	34.4
Average relative humidity (%)	61	47	39	32	28	25	23	26	36	43	53	63	40
Average dew point °C (°F)	2.26 (36.07)	1.40 (34.52)	2.16 (35.89)	3.50 (38.30)	5.64 (42.15)	8.09 (46.56)	8.97 (48.15)	10.62 (51.12)	11.75 (53.15)	9.43 (48.97)	5.86 (42.55)	3.65 (38.57)	6.11 (43.00)
Mean monthly sunshine hours	232.5	238	275.9	300	344.1	357	387.5	365.8	306.0	282.1	243	235.6	3,567.5
Percentage possible sunshine	73.63	77.8	74.78	77.21	80.18	83.08	88.30	87.87	81.96	79.70	77.19	76.10	80.23
Average ultraviolet index	4	6	8	10	10	12	12	11	9	8	5	4	8
Source 1: NOAA
Source 2: climatebase.ru (extremes, humidity)

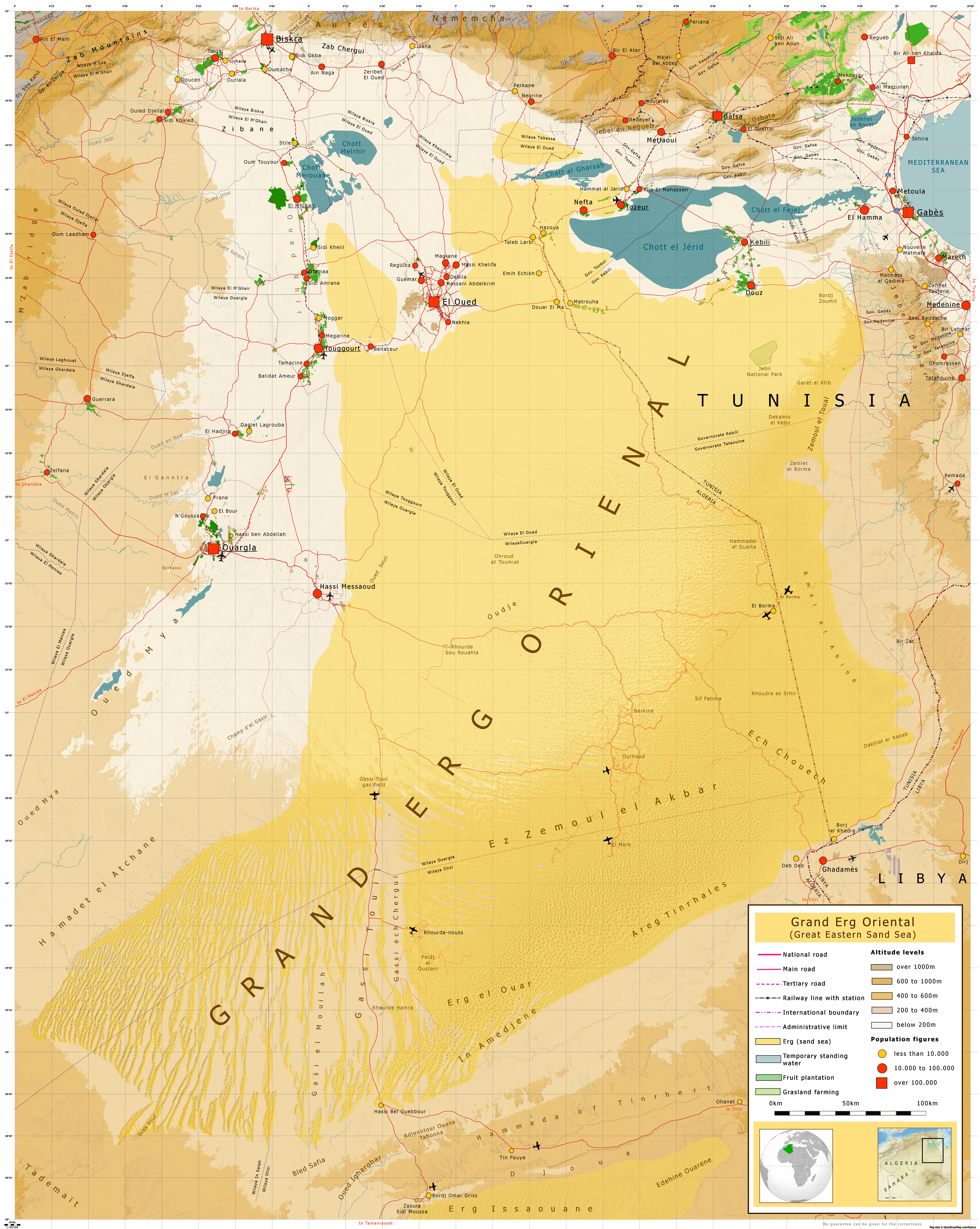
Grand Erg Oriental with El Oued at the top center

== Transportation ==
The N16 highway connects El Oued to Touggourt to the southwest and Tebessa to the northeast. The N48 connects El Oued to the town of Still to the north, from which the N3 may be used to reach Biskra.

El Oued lies about 20 kilometres (12 mi) south of Guemar Airport.

== Education ==
7.4% of the population has a tertiary education, and another 17.5% has completed secondary education. The overall literacy rate is 86.1% (second highest in the province), and is 91.2% among males (second highest in the province) and 80.6% among females (equal highest in the province).

== Localities ==
The commune of El Oued is composed of six localities:

- El Oued
- Mahda
- Legtouta
- Keraïma
- Oum Sahaouine
- Mih Bahi Sud
