= Bounoura District =

Bounoura District دائرة بونورة
- District
- Map of Algeria highlighting Ghardaïa Province

- Map of Ghardaïa Province highlighting Bounoura District
- Coordinates: 32°28′57″N 3°42′13″E
- Country: Algeria
- Province: Ghardaïa
- District seat: Bounoura

Area
  - Total: 1,560 km^{2} (600 sq mi)

Population (2005)
  - Total: 48,110
  - Density: 30.8/km^{2} (79.9/sq mi)
- Time zone: UTC+01 (CET)
- Municipalities: 2

Bounoura is a district in Ghardaïa Province, Algeria. It was named after its capital, Bounoura.

== Municipalities ==
The district is further divided into 2 municipalities:

- Bounoura
- El Atteuf
