= El Groune El Garaa =

El Groune El Garaa: ⵍⴳⵕⵓⵏ ⵍⴳⴰⵕⵄⴰ (Standard Moroccan Tamazight); الكرون الكرعة (Arabic)
- Rural commune and town
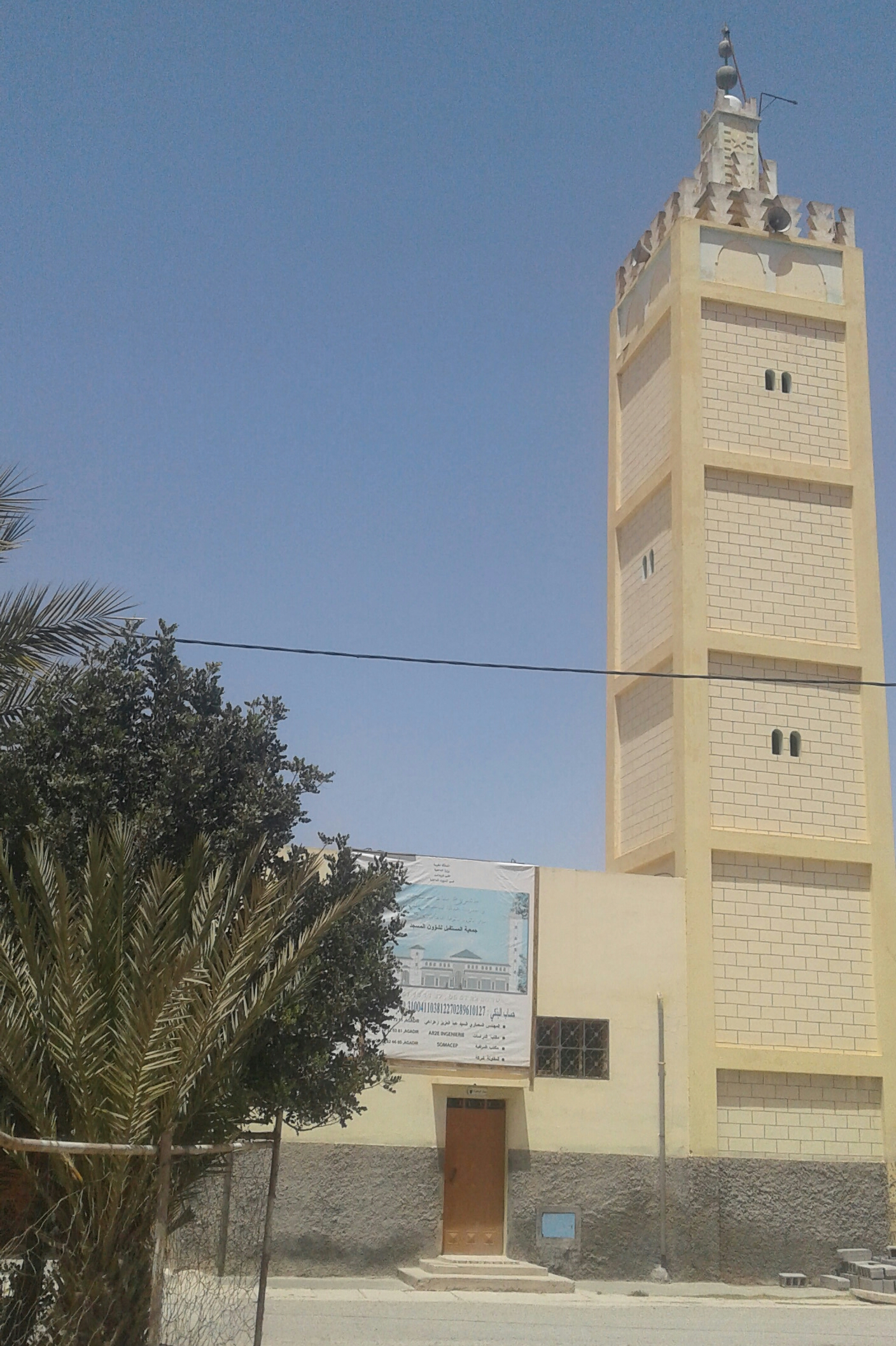
- The mosque of El Groune El Garaa
- Country: Morocco
- Region: Souss-Massa
- Province: Taroudant Province

Population (2004)
  - Total: 2,667
- Time zone: UTC+0 (GMT)

El Groune El Garaa (Standard Moroccan Tamazight: ⵍⴳⵕⵓⵏ ⵍⴳⴰⵕⵄⴰ, romanized: lgṛun lgaṛɛa; Arabic: الكرون الكرعة), is a village located in El Koudia El Beida commune, in Taroudant Province of the Souss-Massa region of Morocco. The village belongs to the commune of El Koudia El Beida, which includes 10 villages. Its population is estimated at 2,667 people, according to the official population and housing census of 2004.
