= Berber orthography =

Writing systems for the Berber languages

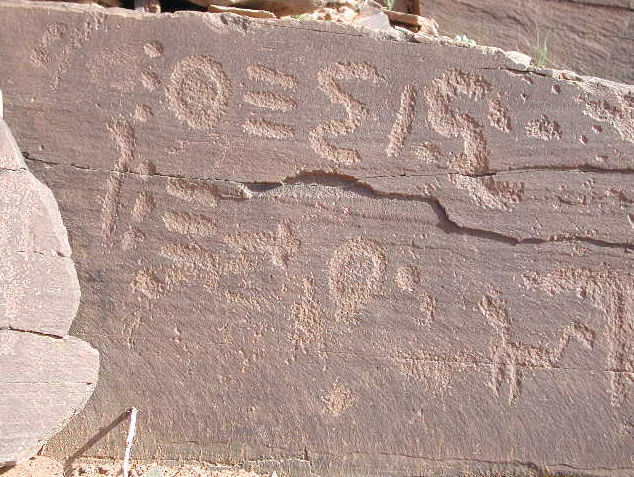
Ancient Libyco-Berber inscriptions in Zagora, Morocco

Amazigh orthography is the writing system(s) used to transcribe the Amazigh languages.

In antiquity, the Libyco-Berber script was utilized to write Amazigh languages. Early uses of the script have been found on rock art and in various sepulchres. Usage of this script, in the form of Tifinagh, has continued into the present day among the Tuareg people.

Following the spread of Islam, some Amazigh scholars utilized the Arabic script. Excluding among the Tuareg people, the Arabic script became the dominant form of Amazigh orthography.

The Berber Latin alphabet was developed following the introduction of the Latin script in the nineteenth century by the West. The nineteenth century also saw the development of Neo-Tifinagh, an adaptation of Tuareg Tifinagh for use with other Amazigh languages.

There are now three writing systems in use for Amazigh languages: Tifinagh, the Arabic script, and the Berber Latin alphabet. Different groups in North Africa have different preferences of writing system, often motivated by ideology and politics. With the exception of one text transcribed in Hebraic square alphabet, no other systems are known to have been used to transcribe the Amazigh languages.

== Tifinagh ==
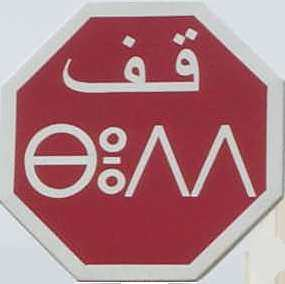
Bilingual stop sign erected in Nador, Arabic: qif and Berber: ⴱⴻⴷⴷ (Bedd), it was erected in 2003 by the Nador municipality, and was removed by the Moroccan police within 24 hours

Neo-Tifinagh, (Note: Linguists and historians tend to be specific in distinguishing between the millennia-old Berber abjad used by the Tuareg to a limited extent and found in some historical engravings and which is 'Tifinagh'; and the 'Neo-Tifinagh' alphabet which is based on the abjad but marks vowels and distinguishes more consonants. The Neo-Tifinagh script was developed and computerized in the 20th century mainly by Moroccan and Algerian researchers, some of whom were based in Europe. It has been used since the early 1970s in Berber publications, see Chaker (1996:4).) a resurrected version of an alphabetic script found in historical engravings, is the de jure writing system for Tamazight in Morocco. The script was made official by a Dahir of King Mohammed VI, based on the recommendation of IRCAM. It was recognized in the Unicode standard in June 2004.

Tifinagh was chosen to be official after consideration of its univocity (one sound per symbol, allowing regional variation), economy, consistency, and historicity. Significantly, Tifinagh avoids negative cultural connotations of the Latin and Arabic scripts.

Tifinagh is preferred by young people as a symbol of identity and has popular support. It has also been criticized for not being practical to implement, and for being Kabyle-centric and not historically authentic. Following the Tifinagh Dahir road signs were installed in the Riffian city of Nador in Arabic and Tifinagh, but these were removed by security forces in the middle of the night soon after.

The Moroccan state arrested and imprisoned people using this script during the 1980s and the 1990s, but now Morocco is the only country in which Tifinagh has official status.

== Latin ==
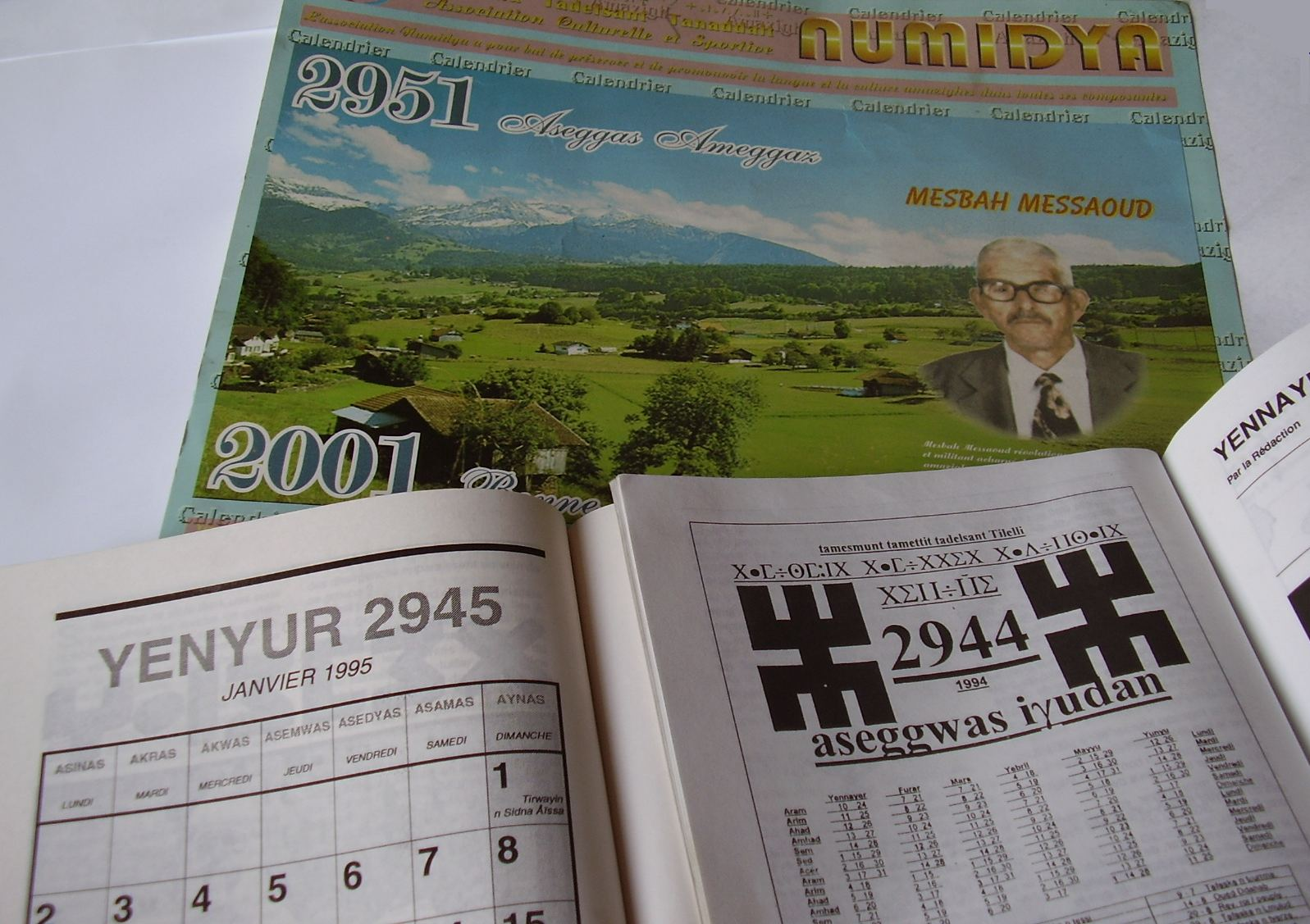
Calendars using the Berber Latin alphabet

The Latin script has its origins in French colonialism. French missionaries and linguists found the Arabic script inconvenient, so they adapted the Latin alphabet to various Berber languages and Arabic vernaculars. While the established body of literature in the Arabic script was a barrier to wider adoption of the Latin script, it caught on among the French-educated minority, particularly in Algeria.

Since independence, the Latin alphabet has been largely favored by the intelligentsia, especially in Kabylie where the Berberists are largely pro-Westernization and French-educated. A standard transcription for the Kabyle language was established in 1970, and most other Northern Berber dialects have to varying extents published literature in the Latin alphabet.

The Latin alphabet has been preferred among Amazigh linguists and researchers, and also has a great deal of established writing, including newspapers, periodicals, and magazines. The "overwhelming majority of theses and dissertations on Berber in Morocco and Algeria" are written using the Latin alphabet. Usage of the Latin alphabet for Berber is more popular in Algeria than Morocco, but prevalent in the Riffian area. It is backed by the Amazigh elite, but is vehemently opposed by the Moroccan pro-Arab establishment. The Latin script is far more ensconced in the Kabyle dialect than in Tamazight.

The orthography used in most modern printed works is the Institut national des langues et civilisations orientales (INALCO) standard, designed for phonemicity. Older systems from the colonial French era are still found in place names and personal names. The older colonial system showed marked influence from French, for instance writing /u, w/ as ⟨ou⟩ and /sˤ/ as ⟨ç⟩, and was inconsistent in marking many Berber sounds, for instance writing /ʕ/ as a circumflex over the vowel, and often leaving emphatics unmarked.

== Arabic ==
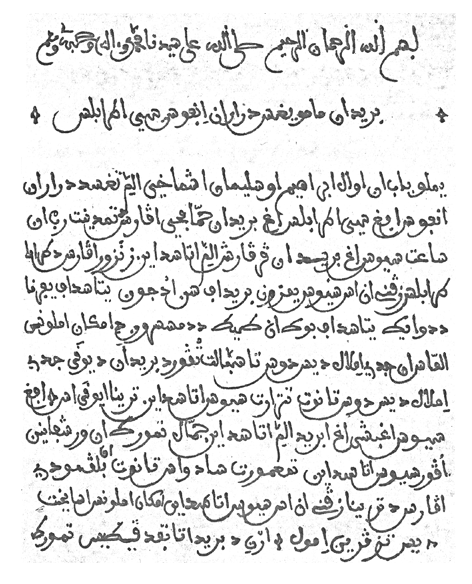
Document in Berber language of Jebel Nefousa – Libya

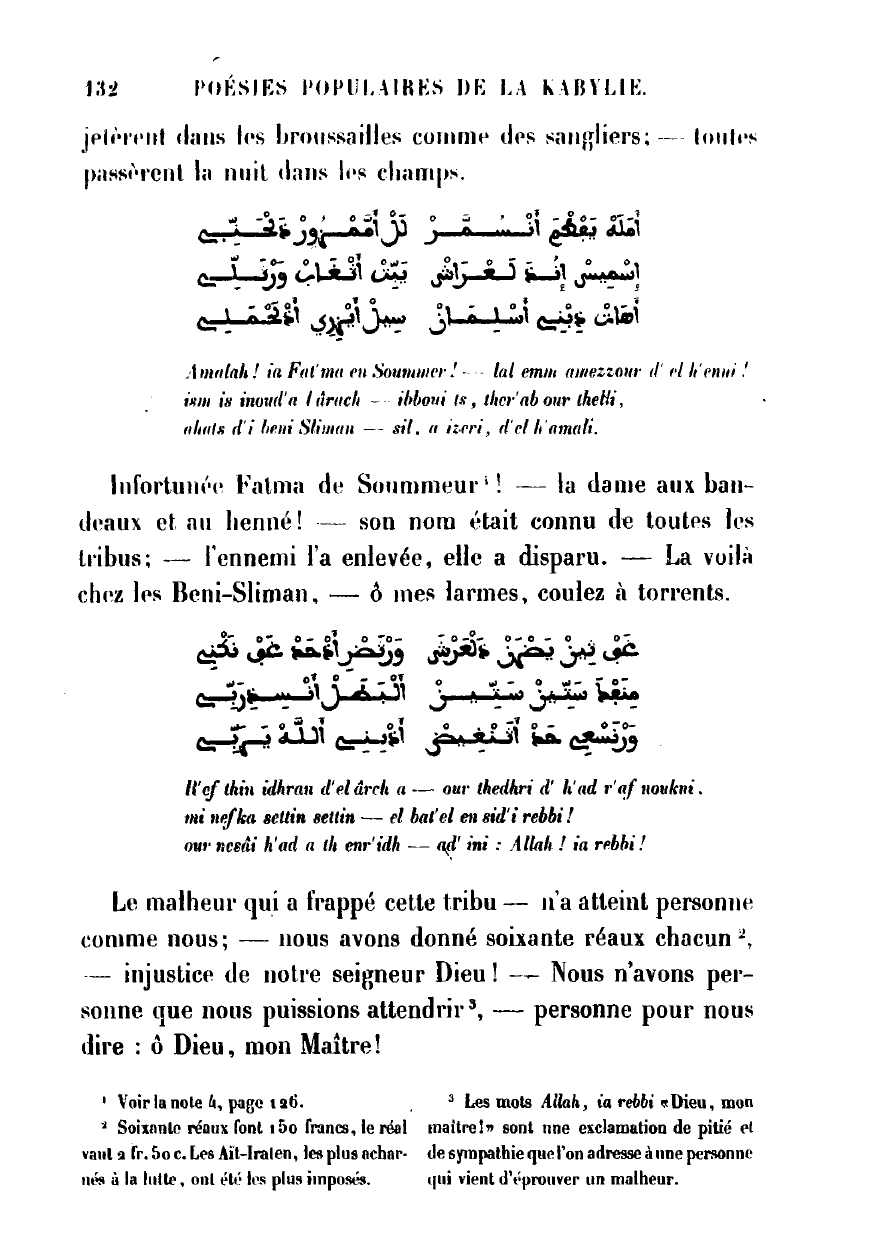
Berber language poetry in Arabic script with its translation in French

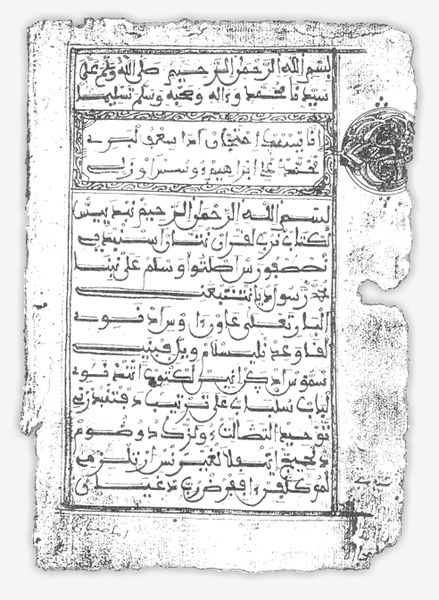
The first page of an 18th-century Sous Berber manuscript of Muḥammad Awzal's al-Ḥawḍ, part I (adapted from N. v.d. Boogert 1997 plate I)

Tifinagh is the traditional script for written Berber, but Latin remains the predominant orthography for literature aimed at the general public in North Africa. Some Tamazight newspapers, periodicals, and magazines are written in the Arabic script, although the Latin alphabet is preferred. The policies of some North African states have imposed the Arabic script over others suggested by Berber groups, which has been perceived as Arab colonialism replacing the prior French variety. Amazigh activists, however, eschew the Arabic script, which is generally unpopular among Berbers who believe it is symptomatic of the pan-Arabist views of North African governments.

Medieval orthography

A consistent orthography was used in the few Berber texts in existence from the eleventh to the fourteenth century CE. These were written in an older Berber language likely to be most closely related to Tashelhiyt. The consonant g was written with jīm (ج) or kāf (ك), ẓ with ṣād (ص) or sometimes zāy (ز), and ḍ with ṭāʼ (ط). Vowels a, i, u were written as orthographically long vowels ⟨ā⟩, ⟨ī⟩, ⟨ū⟩. Word-final wāw was usually accompanied by alif al-wiqāyah. The vowels signs fatḥah or kasrah represent a phonemic shwa /ə/ which was lost in the post-medieval language, e.g. tuwərmin ⟨tūwarmīn⟩ (تووَرمين) “joints, articulation”. Labialization may be represented by ḍammah, e.g. tagʷərsa ⟨tāgursā⟩ (تاكُرسا) “ploughshare”. Prepositions, possessive complements and the like are mostly written as separate words. The medieval texts display many archaisms in phonology, morphology and lexicon.

Traditional Tashelhiyt orthography

The way in which Tashelhiyt has been written in the Arabic script during the past centuries is very consistent, to the extent that it is possible to talk about “a conventionalized orthography”. This premodern orthography has remained virtually unchanged since at least the end of the 16th century, and is still used today in circles of traditional Islamic scholars (ṭṭlba).

The Maghrebi script style is always used. Distinctive features of Maghrebi script are: the different pointing of fāʼ and qāf; shaddah may be represented with a V-shaped symbol; waṣl is indicated by writing the final vowel of the preceding word a second time with the alif (with u represented by a bar through the middle of the alif), e.g. kullu n-nāsi ⟨kullu (u)l-nnāsi⟩ “all the people”.

In premodern Shilha orthography, two extra letters were added to the alphabet to represent consonants not represented by the Standard Arabic alphabet: a kāf with three dots ݣ for g, and ṣād with three dots ڞ for ẓ (dots may also be added underneath the letter). Consonants ṛ and ḷ, which bear a minimal functional load, are not distinguished in the spelling from r and l.

Texts are always fully vocalized, with a, i and u written with the vowel signs fatḥah, kasrah, and ḍammah. Consonants without a following phonemic vowel are always written with a sukūn. Gemination is indicated as usual with shaddah, but in Shilha spelling it may be combined with sukūn to represent a geminated consonant without following vowel (which never occurs in Standard Arabic). Labialization is generally not represented, e.g. tagʷrsa ⟨tagrsa⟩ “plough share”. The Arabic waṣl spellings are often “mirrored” and used to write word-initial vowels, e.g. ayyur ula tafukt ⟨ayyur(u) ulatafukt⟩ “the moon as well as the sun”.

Vowel length is not distinctive in Shilha, but orthographically long vowels may be used to indicate emphasized syllables in metric texts, e.g. lxálayiq ⟨lxālayiq⟩ “creatures” vs. standard Arabic orthography ⟨l-xalāʼiq⟩.

The Arabic letters ﺙ, ﺫ, ﻅ, representing the Arabic interdentals /θ, ð, ð̣/ may be used in etymological spellings of loanwords, but they are often replaced by ﺕ, ﺩ, ﺽ, in accordance with Shilha pronunciation, e.g. lḥadit “tradition” can be written as ⟨lḥadiθ⟩ (etymological) or as ⟨lḥadit⟩ (phonemic). Final /-a/ in both native Berber words and loan words is sometimes written with alif maqṣūrah, even if the Standard Arabic spelling does not use it, e.g. zzka “alms tax” written as ⟨zzká⟩ vs. standard ⟨z-zkā^{t}⟩. Final -t in words of Arabic origin is sometimes written with tāʼ marbūṭah, whether or not the original Arabic word was spelled with it, e.g. zzit “olive oil” written as ⟨zzi^{t}⟩. Nunation diacritics are sometimes used to write final -Vn in Shilha words, e.g. tumẓin “barley” ⟨tumẓin⟩ or ⟨tumẓ^{in}⟩. Native words starting with a vowel and a geminated consonant may sometimes be written as if they contain the Arabic definite article, e.g. azzar “hair” written as ⟨al-zzar⟩. Final -u or -w in Shilha words may be written with a following alif al-wiqāyah.

With respect to word divisions, the premodern orthography may be characterized as conjunctive (in contrast to most European orthographies, which are disjunctive). Thus, elements such as prepositions, preverbals, pronominal affixes, demonstrative and directional particles are written connected to a noun or verb form, e.g. ⟨urānɣiḍhir manīɣurikfis iblisī⟩ = ur anɣ iḍhir mani ɣ ur ikfis iblis-i “it is not apparent to us where Iblis has not sown [his depravity]”.

== Bibliography ==
- Abdel-Massih, Ernest T. (1971). A Course in Spoken Tamazight. Ann Arbor: University of Michigan. ISBN 0-932098-04-5.
- Boogert, N. van den (1989). "Some notes on Maghribi script" (PDF). Manuscripts of the Middle East. 4: 30–43.
- Boogert, N. van den (1997). The Berber Literary Tradition of the Sous. With an edition and translation of "The Ocean of Tears" by Muḥammad Awzal (d. 1749). De Goeje Fund, Vol. XXVII. Leiden: NINO. ISBN 90-6258-971-5.
- Boogert, N. van den (2000). "Medieval Berber orthography". In Chaker, S.; Zaborski, A. (eds.). Etudes berères et chamito-sémitiques, Mélanges offerts à Karl-G. Prasse. Paris and Louvain: Peeters. pp. 357–377. ISBN 978-90-429-0826-0.
- Ben-Layashi, Samir (2007). "Secularism in the Moroccan Amazigh Discourse" (PDF). The Journal of North African Studies. 12 (2). Routledge: 153–171. doi:10.1080/13629380701201741. ISSN 1362-9387. S2CID 143728476. Archived from the original (PDF) on September 23, 2010.
- Bouhjar, Aicha (2008). Amazigh Language Terminology in Morocco or Management of a 'Multidimensional' Variation (PDF). International Conference on Language Resources and Evaluation (LREC). Rabat: IRCAM.
- Brenzinger, Matthias (2007). Language Diversity Endangered. Berlin: Mouton de Gruyter. ISBN 978-3-11-017049-8.
- Chaker, Salem (1996). Tira n Tmaziɣt – propositions pour la notation usuelle a base latine du berbere (PDF). Problèmes en suspens de la notation usuelle à base latine du berbère (in French). Paris: INALCO. Archived from the original (PDF) on November 29, 2008.
- El Aissati, Abderrahman (2001). "Ethnic identity, language shift and The Amazigh voice in Morocco and Algeria" (PDF). Race, Gender & Class. 8 (3). Archived from the original (PDF) on December 17, 2020.
- Prasse, Karl G. (2000). Études berbères et chamito-sémitiques: mélanges offerts à Karl-G. Prasse (in French). Peeters Publishers. ISBN 90-429-0826-2.
- Souag, Lameen (2004). "Writing Berber Languages: a quick summary". L. Souag. Archived from the original on July 30, 2005.
