= Bani Teleb =

Bani Teleb: ⴱⵏⵉⵟⵉⵍⴱ (Standard Moroccan Tamazight); بني طيلب (Arabic)
- Rural commune and town
- Location within Morocco
- Coordinates: 30°21′44″N 9°07′08″W
- Country: Morocco
- Region: Souss-Massa
- Province: Taroudant Province

Population (2004)
  - Total: 1,985
- Time zone: UTC+0 (GMT)

Bani Teleb (Standard Moroccan Tamazight: ⴱⵏⵉⵟⵉⵍⴱ, romanized: bniṭilb; Arabic: بني طيلب), is a village located in El Koudia El Beida commune, in Taroudant Province of the Souss-Massa region of Morocco. The village belongs to the commune of El Koudia El Beida, which includes 10 villages. Its population is estimated at 1985 people, according to the official population and housing census of 2004.
