= Names of the Berber people =

Discussion of ethnonyms for the Imazighen

The indigenous population of the Maghreb region of North Africa have been referred to by various names throughout history. They are collectively known in English as Berbers, or by their endonym, Amazigh. The native plural form Imazighen is sometimes also used in English. While "Berber" is more widely known among English-speakers, its usage is a subject of debate, due to its historical background as an exonym and equivalence with the Arabic word for "barbarian." When speaking English, indigenous North Africans typically refer to themselves as "Amazigh."

The Numidian, Mauri and Libu populations of antiquity are typically understood to refer to approximately the same population as modern Amazigh or Berbers.

== Today ==
=== Berber ===
Tribal titles such as Barabara and Beraberata appear in Egyptian inscriptions of 1700 and 1300 BC, and the Berbers were most likely well known to the Egyptians in those times. Therefore the actual ethnic name may have become confused with Barbari, which was used by other empires in that era such as the Ancient Greeks.

In Archaic Greece, βάρβαροι (barbaroi) 'barbarians' was an onomatopoeic word for languages perceived as unintelligible, as well as for their speakers; bar-bar was an imitation of these languages. Around the beginning of Classical Greece, the term had come to be used for all and non-Greek speakers. Greek writers applied the term to North African tribes alongside other designations such as "Numidians" and specific tribal names. Among the oldest written attestations of the word Berber is its use as an ethnonym in a document from the 1st century AD Periplus of the Erythraean Sea.

The Greek barbaroi was borrowed as the Arabic word بربرة (barbara) 'to babble noisily, to jabber', which was used by conquering Arabs to describe indigenous North African peoples, due to the perceived oddness of their (non-Semitic) language. This usage was the first recorded to refer to indigenous North Africans as the "Berber" collective. Though "Berber" had been used in reference to East Africans as well, it was mostly applied to Maghreb tribes in conquest narratives, and this became the dominant usage of the term.

The English term "Berber" is derived from the Arabic word barbar, which means both "Berber" and "barbarian." Due to this shared meaning, as well as its historical background as an exonym, the term "Berber" is commonly viewed as a pejorative by indigenous North Africans today.

=== Amazigh ===
Amazigh (fem. Tamazight, pl. Imazighen) is the endonym for the indigenous people of North Africa, often referred to as "Berber" in English. "Amazigh" is also used in English, and its native plural "Imazighen" is sometimes used as well. Many Amazigh people prefer the term "Amazigh" over "Berber," as the latter has derogatory connotations. According to anthropologist Jane E. Goodman, using "Amazigh" signals a rejection of the pejorative associations of "Berber" and advocates a particular political vision for the Maghreb's future. The term is especially common in Morocco among speakers of Central Atlas Tamazight, Tarifit and Shilha, particularly since 1980. Its usage does not replace that for more specific ethnic groups, such as Kabyle or Chaoui.

Relatedly, the endonym of Berber languages is typically Tamazight, and in English, "Tamazight" and "Berber languages" are often used interchangeably. "Tamazight" may also be used for a specific language, such as Central Atlas Tamazight or Standard Moroccan Amazigh, depending on the context of its usage.

The word Amazigh derives from a name used by the Berbers in the ancient era. This name is found in Ancient Tifinagh inscriptions written as "MSK" and in Roman inscriptions it is written as "Masik" and "Mazix". It is also suggested that the 1945 poem “Kker a mmis umazigh” (“Rise up Son of Amazigh”) by Mohand Idir Aït Amrane was the first time it was used as a cultural claim.

==== Etymology ====
The name "Amazigh" is likely connected to the ancient Mazices, a Libyco-Berber people mentioned in classical sources. The medieval historian Ibn Khaldun traced the name to an ancestor called Mazigh.

According to the Berber author Leo Africanus, Amazigh meant 'free man'. Related words such as mmuzeɣ ('to be noble', 'generous') exist among the Imazighen of Central Morocco and tmuzeɣ ('to free oneself', 'revolt') exist among the Kabyles of Ouadhia. Further, Amazigh also has a cognate in the Tuareg word Amajegh, meaning 'noble'.

The linguist Salem Chaker suggests that the term potentially did not originally have an ethnic meaning but was a common noun from the root ZƔ, “to pitch a tent” which is attested in central Morocco. "Amazigh" would have thus meant "the one who pitches/lives in the tent” or “the nomad”.

== Historical ==
=== Libyans ===
Currently the people call themselves the Imazighan, but in the ancient era they were known as the Libyans. The Libyans referred to the indigenous population of North Africa which were distinguished by their lighter skin and other characteristics compared to the Subsaharans. The Ancient Greeks for example would refer to the Berbers as the Libyans.

=== Moors ===
Romans referred to the indigenous tribes of Mauretania as Mauri, or "Moors."

Indigenous North African tribes, along with other populations, were referred to as "Moors" by medieval Europeans.

The historical interchangeability between "Berbers" and "Moors" is a subject of academic inquiry.

== See also ==
- Berber people
- Berber language
