= Yennayer =

First month of the Berber year

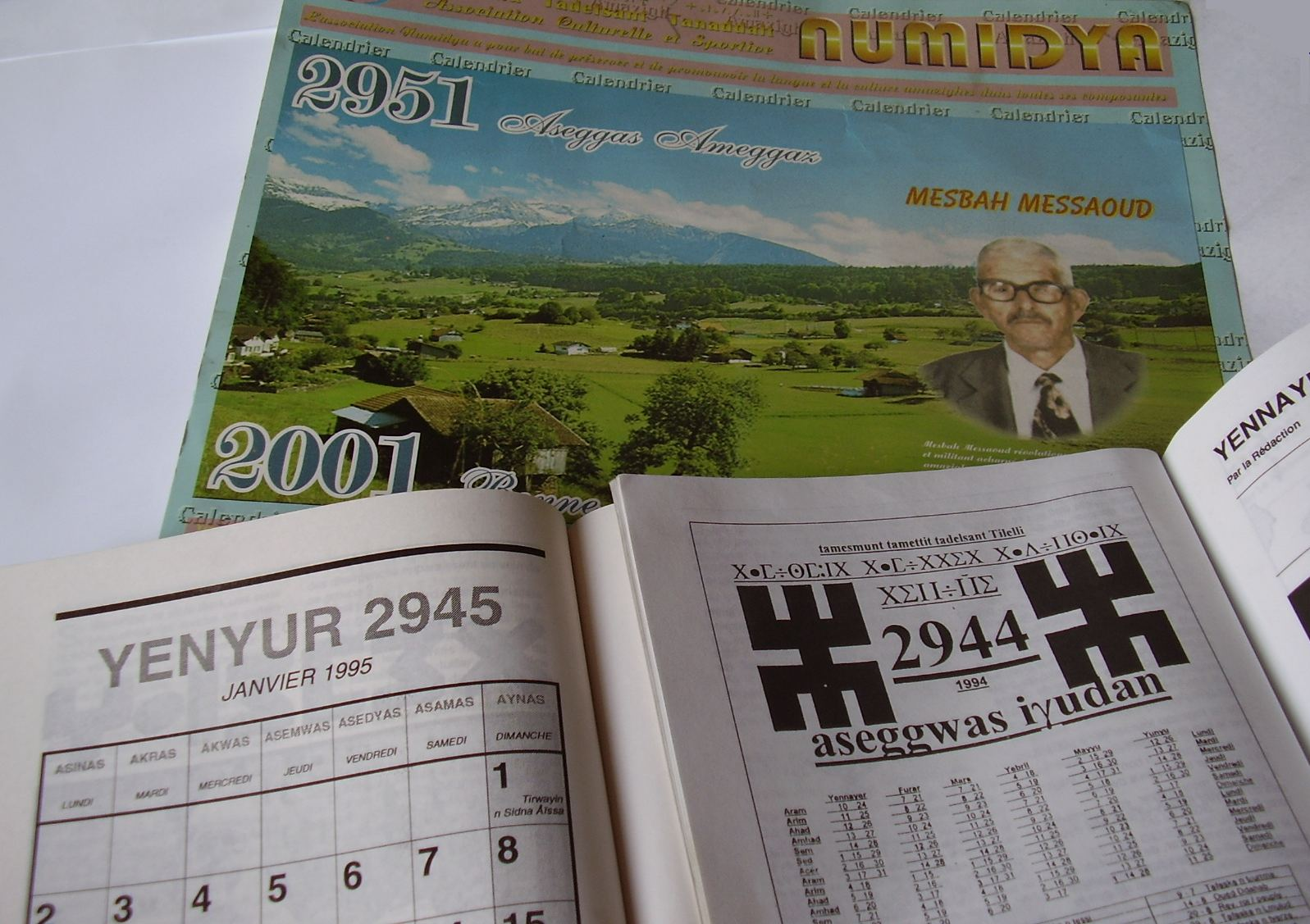
- Three Berber (Amazigh) calendars, all of them refer to the Shoshenq era (Gregorian + 950).
- Official name: Aseggwas Amaziɣ ⴰⵙⴳⴳⵯⴰⵙ ⴰⵎⴰⵣⵉⵖ
- Also called: Berber New Year
- Observed by: Algeria; Morocco; Tunisia; Libya; Egypt (Siwa Oasis)
- Type: Cultural
- Begins: 12 January
- Ends: 14 January
- Date: 12 January

Yennayer (Note: Arabic: ينّاير; Berber languages: Yennayer; Berber languages: ⵢⵏⵏⴰⵢⵔ or Berber languages: ⵉⴹ ⵏ ⵉⵏⵏⴰⵢⵔ) is the first month of the Berber (Amazigh) calendar. The first day of Yennayer corresponds to the first day of January in the Julian Calendar, which is shifted thirteen days compared to the Gregorian calendar, thus falling on 14 January every year. The Berber calendar was created in 1980 by Ammar Negadi, an Algerian scholar. He chose 943 BC (rounded off to 950), the year in which the Meshwesh Shoshenq I ascended to the throne of Egypt, as the first year of the Berber calendar.

There is some debate about the traditional date of Yennayer, with some cultural associations advocating for its celebration on the evening of 12 January, which is widespread in Algeria, Morocco, Libya, and the Canary Islands.

On 27 December 2017, Algerian President Abdelaziz Bouteflika officially recognized Yennayer as a public holiday to be celebrated on 12 January every year. The first official celebration of Yennayer as a public holiday in Algeria took place on 12 January 2018. On 3 May 2023, King Mohammed VI of Morocco declared the Berber New Year as a national public holiday in Morocco.

== Origins ==
The Berber Academy was established with the intention of recognizing Yennayer as the "Amazigh New Year," based on the longstanding tradition of North Africans celebrating the event each year. In 1980, Ammar Negadi proposed the creation of a Berber calendar.

== Names and etymology ==
Yennayer is said to be composed of two Berber words: yan, meaning "the number one," and ayyur, meaning "month" with yennayer signifying "the first month".

Yennayer has several popular names that can differ by region such as id seggas (Moroccan Arabic: إيض سڭاس) or haguza (Moroccan Arabic: حاڭوزة) in Morocco.

== Celebration ==
One of the most significant aspects of Yennayer is the preparation of a special, symbolic meal, which is hearty and distinct from everyday dishes. In Algeria, Yennayer is celebrated across various Amazigh regions, including the Kabyle, Chaoui, Mozabite, and Tuareg communities, each adding unique touches to the tradition.

Chaoui traditions: In the Chaoui region of the Aurès Mountains, Yennayer is marked with the preparation of trida (thin pastry sheets soaked in a flavorful meat sauce) or chakhchoukha, a dish of shredded flatbread mixed with meat and vegetables in a rich sauce. The Chaoui people also hold communal gatherings where families share meals and exchange blessings for prosperity and abundance in the new year.

Kabyle traditions: The Kabyle people prepare asfel, a dish made from the meat of a sacrificial animal, paired with couscous enriched with seasonal vegetables. They also prepare berkukes, a hearty dish with vegetables and grain-like pasta.

Mozabite and Tuareg contributions: Other regions, like the M'Zab Valley and the Sahara, bring their own flavors to the celebration, often including dates, traditional bread, and goat-based dishes.

In the Sous region of southern Morocco, participants enjoy dishes such as tagula, made of barley with smen and argan oil.

== Symbolism and rites ==
In addition to the special meal, Yennayer is a time for exchanging wishes of prosperity and longevity. The celebration is often marked by significant symbolic events, such as:

First haircuts: Families often commemorate Yennayer with the first haircut of young boys, symbolizing growth and renewal.

Marriage blessings: Marriages planned under the auspicious timing of Yennayer are believed to carry good omens.

Agricultural initiation rites: In rural areas, Berber children are sent to collect fruits and vegetables from the farm, connecting them with nature and symbolizing the promise of future harvests.

The rites performed during Yennayer are rich with symbolism, aiming to eliminate famine, augur change and prosperity, and warmly welcome the invisible forces that Berbers traditionally believed in.

== Bibliography ==
- Encyclopaedia Universalis. France S.A. 1989.
- Paul Couderc. Le calendrier. P.U.F. Que sais-je. n^{o} 203
- Jean Servier. Tradition et civilisation berbères. "Les portes de l’année". Éditions du Rocher. août 1985

== See also ==
- Berber calendar
- Mawsim
