= Ammar Negadi =

Algerian writer (1943 - 2008)

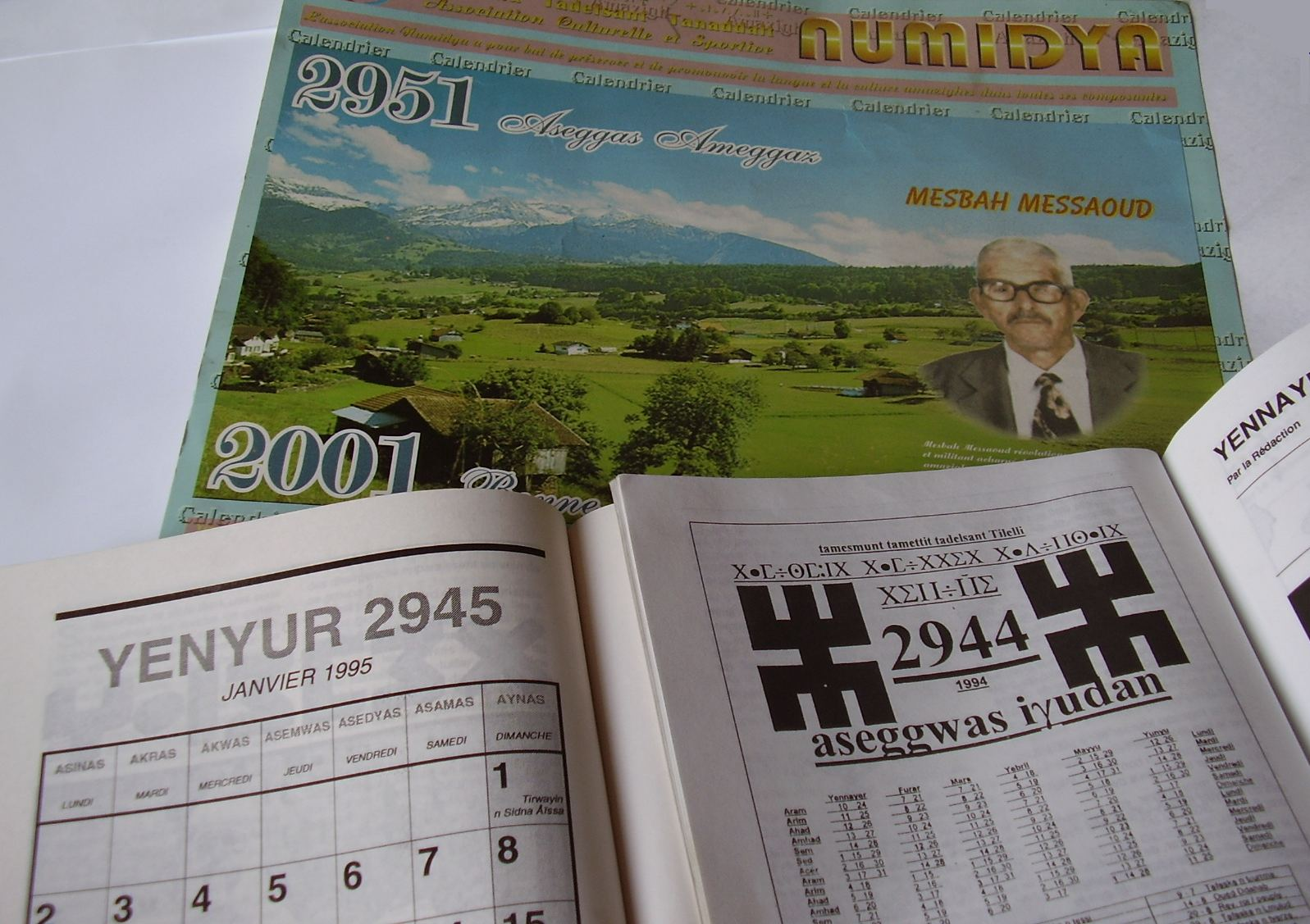
- Born: 1943
- Died: 1 December 2008 (aged 64–65)
- Occupation: Writer
- Writing career
- Period: 1967 – 2004
- Subject: Amazigh studies
- Notable work: Azaghen/Link publication

Ammar Negadi (1943 – 1 December 2008) was an Algerian Berber linguist and writer known for his fervent advocacy for the Tifinagh script.

== Biography ==
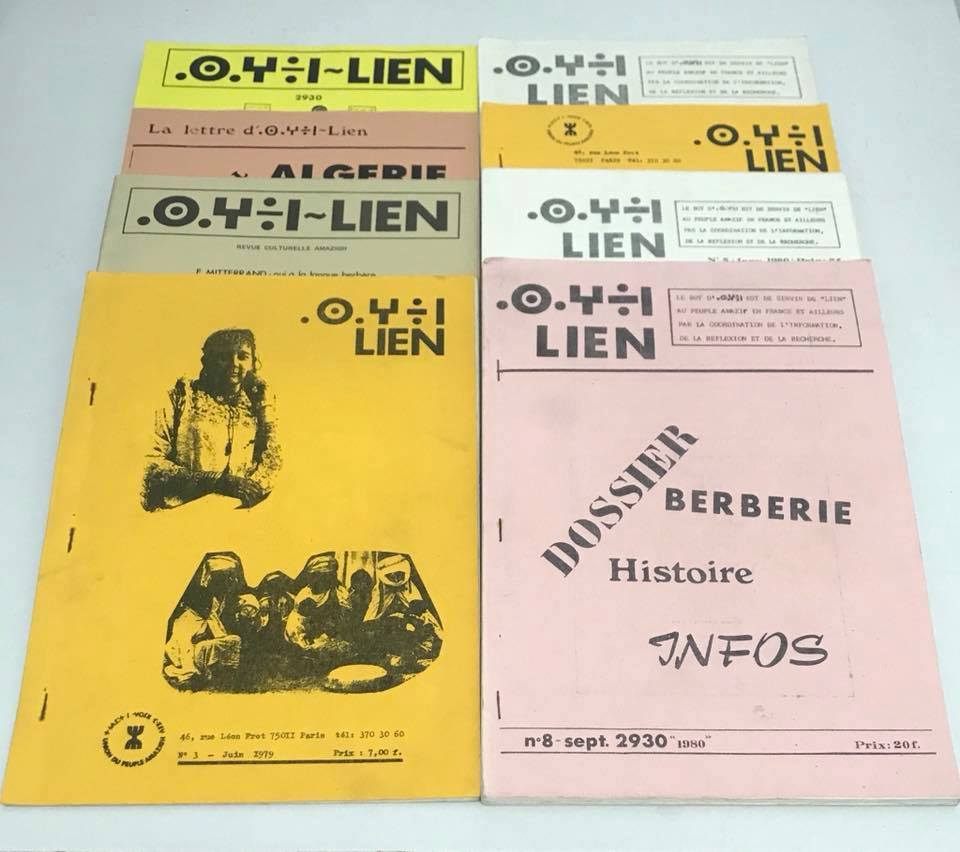
Azaghen/Link publications by Ammar Negadi - 1980

Born in 1943 in Bélezma, Merouana, in the Aurès region of Algeria, Negadi played a pivotal role in shaping the discourse and activism surrounding Amazigh rights, particularly during a time of cultural suppression and political adversity.

in the late 1960s Negadi moved to France and became actively involved with the Berber Academy. He was one of the few Chaoui members, and he quickly distinguished himself as a vocal advocate for Tifinagh revival and recognition.

in 1973, Mohand Arav Bessaoud vouched for him to chair the academy as secretary general. Negadi's tenure was marked by his prolific writings and advocacy efforts, Afterward he started distributing Tifinagh publications in the Aures region. However, in 1975, Negadi left the academy, citing 'infiltrations by agitators' as the reason.

In 1980, Negadi, alongside Professor Messaoud Nedjahi and other activists from the Aurès region, founded the association UPA (Union of the Amazigh People).

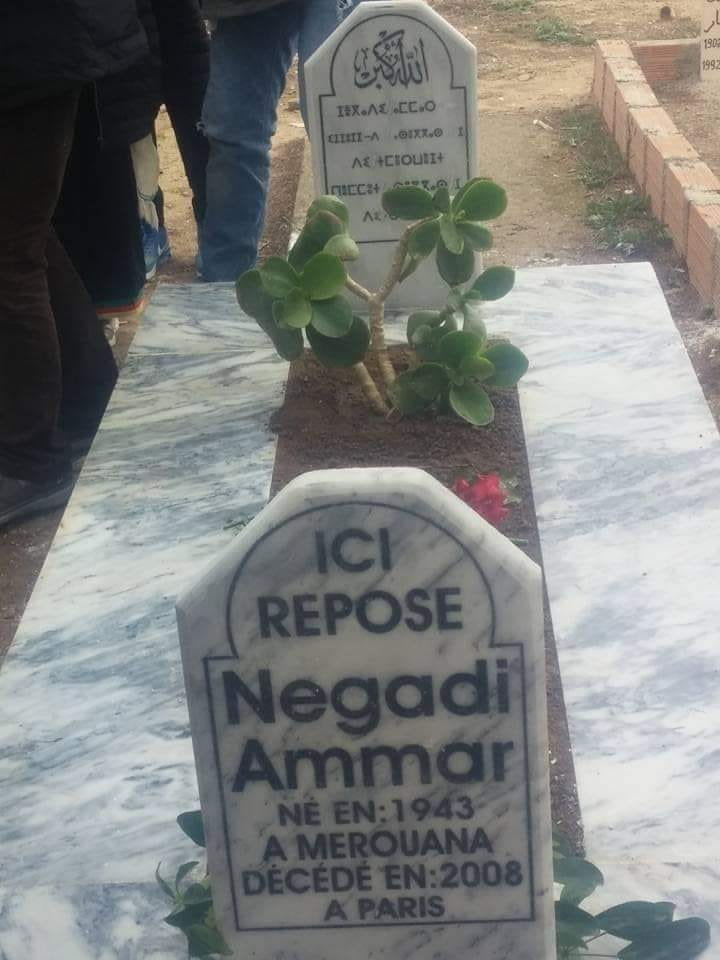
Ammar Negadi's grave - headstone written in Tifinagh script

This spin-off association continued to promote a standardized version of the Neo-Tifinagh script through its Azaghen/Link publication. By 1993, there were several sets of Neo-Tifinagh fonts in place.

Negadi is also credited with establishing a Berber calendar linked to an ancient event contrary to the traditional calendar that doesn't compute the years. This new calendar gained recognition and has been featured on Algerian currency since 2022. The calendar marks the beginning of Berber history, corresponding to the year Shoshenq was enthroned as Pharaoh of Egypt in 950 BC.

== Legacy ==
Ammar Negadi's legacy transcends his scholarly contributions; he is remembered as a dean among Amazigh activists in the Aurès, Following Negadi's passing on December 1, 2008, his body was repatriated to Algeria, where he was laid to rest in his hometown of Merouana. The funeral was attended by a multitude of activists from across the Aurès region, underscoring the profound respect and admiration he commanded within the Amazigh community.

In 2018, Ammar Negadi's final wish was still not fulfilled when over 3,000 books and documents his association had collected on Aures history had still not arrived at the University of Batna.
