= Tifinagh (Unicode block) =

- Range: U+2D30..U+2D7F (80 code points)
- Plane: BMP
- Scripts: Tifinagh
- Major alphabets: Tuareg; Berber
- Assigned: 59 code points
- Unused: 21 reserved code points

Unicode version history
- 4.1 (2005): 55 (+55)
- 6.0 (2010): 57 (+2)
- 6.1 (2012): 59 (+2)

Unicode documentation
- Code chart ∣ Web page

Tifinagh is a Unicode block containing characters of the Neo-Tifinagh alphabet, used for writing Northern Berber and Tuareg Berber in North Africa.

== Block ==
Tifinagh^{[1]}^{[2]} Official Unicode Consortium code chart (PDF)
	0	1	2	3	4	5	6	7	8	9	A	B	C	D	E	F
U+2D3x	ⴰ	ⴱ	ⴲ	ⴳ	ⴴ	ⴵ	ⴶ	ⴷ	ⴸ	ⴹ	ⴺ	ⴻ	ⴼ	ⴽ	ⴾ	ⴿ
U+2D4x	ⵀ	ⵁ	ⵂ	ⵃ	ⵄ	ⵅ	ⵆ	ⵇ	ⵈ	ⵉ	ⵊ	ⵋ	ⵌ	ⵍ	ⵎ	ⵏ
U+2D5x	ⵐ	ⵑ	ⵒ	ⵓ	ⵔ	ⵕ	ⵖ	ⵗ	ⵘ	ⵙ	ⵚ	ⵛ	ⵜ	ⵝ	ⵞ	ⵟ
U+2D6x	ⵠ	ⵡ	ⵢ	ⵣ	ⵤ	ⵥ	ⵦ	ⵧ								ⵯ
U+2D7x	⵰															⵿
Notes: 1. As of Unicode version 16.0; 2. Grey areas indicate non-assigned code points

== History ==
The following Unicode-related documents record the purpose and process of defining specific characters in the Tifinagh block:

Version	Final code points (Note: Proposed code points and characters names may differ from final code points and names)	Count	L2 ID	WG2 ID	Document
4.1	U+2D30..2D65, 2D6F	55	L2/98-219	N1757	Everson, Michael (1998-05-04), Encoding the Tifinagh script
4.1	U+2D30..2D65, 2D6F	55	L2/03-083		Mohammed, Madi (2003-02-07), Revised Proposal for encoding the Tifinagh Script in the UCS
4.1	U+2D30..2D65, 2D6F	55	L2/03-076		Mohammed, Madi (2003-02-28), Tifinagh Background Info: Discussion
4.1	U+2D30..2D65, 2D6F	55	L2/03-077		Mohammed, Madi (2003-02-28), Tifinagh Background Info: Examples
4.1	U+2D30..2D65, 2D6F	55	L2/03-078		Mohammed, Madi (2003-02-28), Tifinagh Background Info: Photographs
4.1	U+2D30..2D65, 2D6F	55	L2/03-110		Hunt, Geoffrey (2003-03-05), Comments on Tifinagh Proposal Documents L2/03-076-078, 03-083
4.1	U+2D30..2D65, 2D6F	55	L2/03-143		Savage, Andrew (2003-05-02), Tifinagh Unicode Propositions
4.1	U+2D30..2D65, 2D6F	55	L2/03-150		Savage, Andrew (2003-05-09), Request for Tifinagh Characters for Inclusion in the Unicode Font
4.1	U+2D30..2D65, 2D6F	55	L2/04-061		Andries, Patrick; Yergeau, François; LaBonté, Alain (2004-01-26), Proposal to add the Tifinagh script
4.1	U+2D30..2D65, 2D6F	55	L2/04-142R	N2739, N2739-1	Andries, Patrick (2004-06-06), Proposal to add the Tifinagh Script
4.1	U+2D30..2D65, 2D6F	55	L2/04-195		Andries, Patrick (2004-06-07), Projet de norme marocaine; Jeux de caractères, Alphabet tifinaghe
4.1	U+2D30..2D65, 2D6F	55	L2/04-274	N2828	Andries, Patrick (2004-06-22), Report of the ad-hoc committee on Tifinagh
4.1	U+2D30..2D65, 2D6F	55	L2/05-038	N2926	Suignard, Michel (2005-01-27), Disposition of comments on SC2 N 3760 (FPDAM text for Amendment 1 to ISO/IEC 10646:2003)
4.1	U+2D30..2D65, 2D6F	55	L2/05-058		Whistler, Ken (2005-02-03), "A. Tifinagh character name changes", WG2 Consent Docket, Part 1: Unicode 4.1 Issues
4.1	U+2D30..2D65, 2D6F	55	L2/05-026		Moore, Lisa (2005-05-16), "WG2 - Unicode 4.1 Consent Docket (B.1.16.1)", UTC #102 Minutes
6.0	U+2D70, 2D7F	2	L2/08-198		Priest, Lorna; Coblentz, Jon (2008-05-05), Proposal to encode a Tifinagh punctuation character and update TUS documentation
6.0	U+2D70, 2D7F	2	L2/08-198R2	N3482	Priest, Lorna A.; Coblentz, Jon; Savage, Andrew (2008-07-28), Proposal to encode additional Tifinagh characters
6.0	U+2D70, 2D7F	2	L2/08-161R2		Moore, Lisa (2008-11-05), "Tifinagh", UTC #115 Minutes
6.0	U+2D70, 2D7F	2	L2/08-412	N3553 (pdf, doc)	Umamaheswaran, V. S. (2008-11-05), "M53.24b", Unconfirmed minutes of WG 2 meeting 53
6.0	U+2D70, 2D7F	2	L2/11-112	N4069	Priest, Lorna A.; Coblentz, Jon (2011-04-20), Documenting a fallback glyph for Tifinagh Consonant Joiner
6.0	U+2D70, 2D7F	2	L2/11-116		Moore, Lisa (2011-05-17), "Consensus 127-C1", UTC #127 / L2 #224 Minutes, "Update glyph for U+2D7F TIFINAGH CONSONANT JOINER to show a dotted circle with 6 dots below within a dashed box."
6.0	U+2D70, 2D7F	2		N4103	"11.1.4 Glyph for Tifinagh Consonant Joiner", Unconfirmed minutes of WG 2 meeting 58, 2012-01-03
6.1	U+2D66..2D67	2	L2/10-096		Anderson, Paul (2010-04-15), Proposal to add two Tifinagh characters for vowels in Tuareg language variants
6.1	U+2D66..2D67	2	L2/10-147		Priest, Lorna; Coblentz, Jon (2010-04-27), Letter in support: L2/10-096 Proposal to add two Tifinagh characters
6.1	U+2D66..2D67	2	L2/10-108		Moore, Lisa (2010-05-19), "C.6", UTC #123 / L2 #220 Minutes
6.1	U+2D66..2D67	2	L2/10-270	N3870	Anderson, Paul (2010-07-30), Proposal to add two Tifinagh characters for vowels in Tuareg language variants
6.1	U+2D66..2D67	2		N3903 (pdf, doc)	"M57.02g", Unconfirmed minutes of WG2 meeting 57, 2011-03-31
