= Berber calendar =

Agricultural calendar traditionally used by Berbers

Today
- Sunday
- Gregorian calendar: 23 August 2026
- Berber calendar: 10 Ɣuct 2976

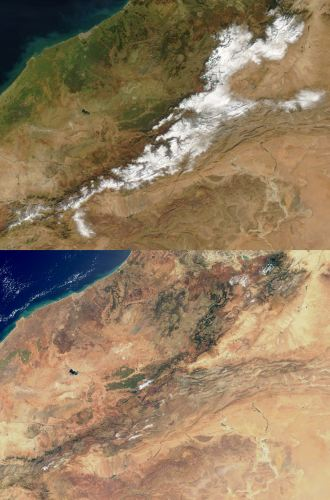
Seasons in North Africa: Atlas Mountains in January and April

The Berber calendar (Berber languages: ⵜⴰⵙⵡⴰⵙⵜ ⵜⴰⵎⴰⵣⵉⵖⵜ, romanized: taswast tamaziɣt) is the agricultural calendar traditionally used by Berbers (Amazigh, plural Imazighen). The calendar is utilized to regulate the seasonal agricultural works.

The current Berber calendar is a legacy of the Roman province of Mauretania Caesariensis and the Roman province of Africa, as it is a surviving form of the Julian calendar. The latter calendar was used in Europe before the adoption of the Gregorian calendar, with month names derived from Latin. Berber populations previously used various indigenous calendars, such as that of the indigenous Guanches of the Canary Islands. However, relatively little is known of these ancient calendrical systems.

== Differences between calendars ==
The agricultural Berber calendar still in use is almost certainly derived from the Julian calendar, introduced in the Roman province of Africa at the time of Roman domination. The names of the months of this calendar are derived from the corresponding Latin names and traces of the Roman calendar denominations of Kalends, Nones and Ides exist: El Qabisi, an Islamic jurisconsult by Kairawan who lived in the 11th century, condemned the custom of celebrating "pagans'" festivals and cited, among traditional habits of North Africa, that of observing the Qalandas ("Kalends") of January (1 January, i.e. the Julian New Year's Day). The length of the year and of the individual months is the same as in the Julian calendar: three years of 365 days followed by a leap year of 366, without exceptions, and 30- and 31-day months, except for the second one that has 28 days. The only slight discrepancy lies in that the extra day in leap years is not usually added at the end of February, but at the end of the year. This means that the beginning of the year (the first day of yennayer) corresponds to the 14th day of January in the Gregorian calendar, which coincides with the offset accumulated during the centuries between astronomical dates and the Julian calendar.

=== Months ===
There are standard forms for the names of the Amazigh (Berber) calendar. The table below also provides the forms used in Morocco, Algeria, Libya and Tunisia .

Month	Riffian (north Morocco)	Shilha (south Morocco)	Shawiya (Algeria)	Kabyle (Algeria)	Mzab (Algeria)	Moroccan Arabic	Tunisian Arabic	Libyan Arabic
January	yennayer	innayr	yennar	(Ye)nnayer	yennar	yanayer	yenna(ye)r	yannayer
February	yebrayer	brayr	furar	Furar	furar	febrayer	fura(ye)r	febrayer
March	mares	marṣ	meɣres	Meɣres	maraṣ	mars	marsu	mars
April	yebrir	ibrir	brir	(Ye)brir	yebrir	abril	abril	ibril
May	may	mayyu(h)	mayu	Mayyu	mayu	mey	mayu	mayu
June	yunyu	yunyu(h)	yunyu	Yunyu	yunyu	yunyu	yunyu	yunyu
July	yulyuz	yulyuz	yulyu	Yulyu(z)	yulyuz	yulyuz	yulyu	yulyu
August	ɣuct	ɣuct	ɣuct	Ɣuct	ɣucet	ɣuct	awussu	aɣustus
September	cutembir (c=sh)	cutambir	ctember	Ctembeṛ	ctember	cutanbir	ctamber	september
October	ktuber	kṭubr	tuber	(k)Tubeṛ	tuber	uktuber	uktuber / ktubru	uktuber
November	nwambir	nuwambir	numbir	Wambeṛ (Nunembeṛ)	unembir	nwanbir	nufember	nuvamber
December	dujembir	dujambir	dujamber	Du- (Bu-)ǧembeṛ	uğembir	dujanbir	dejember	december

In addition, some of the month names in Maltese are of Berber origin, specifically January (jannar), February (frar), May (mejju), and August (awwissu), with the others deriving from Italian. Berber and Italian month names are different enough that it is possible to easily determine the source language of each Maltese month name.

== Seasons and Festivals ==
In addition to the subdivision by months, within the traditional agricultural calendar there are other partitions, by "seasons" or by "strong periods", characterized by particular festivals and celebrations.

Not all the four seasons have retained a Berber denomination: the words for spring and autumn are used almost everywhere, more sparingly the winter and, among northern Berbers, the Berber name for the autumn has been preserved only in Jebel Nafusa (Libya).

- Spring tafsut (Ar. er-rbiʿ) – Begins on 15 furar (28 February)
- Summer anebdu (Ar. es-sif) – Begins on 17 mayu (30 May)
- Autumn amwal / aməwan ( (Ar. le-xrif) – Begins on 17 ghusht (30 August)
- Winter tagrest (Ar. esh-shita) - Begins on 16 numbír (29 November)

An interesting element is the existing opposition between two 40-day terms, one representing the allegedly coldest part of winter ("The nights", llyali) and one the hottest period of summer ("The Dog Days", ssmaym, awussu).

=== Llyali ===
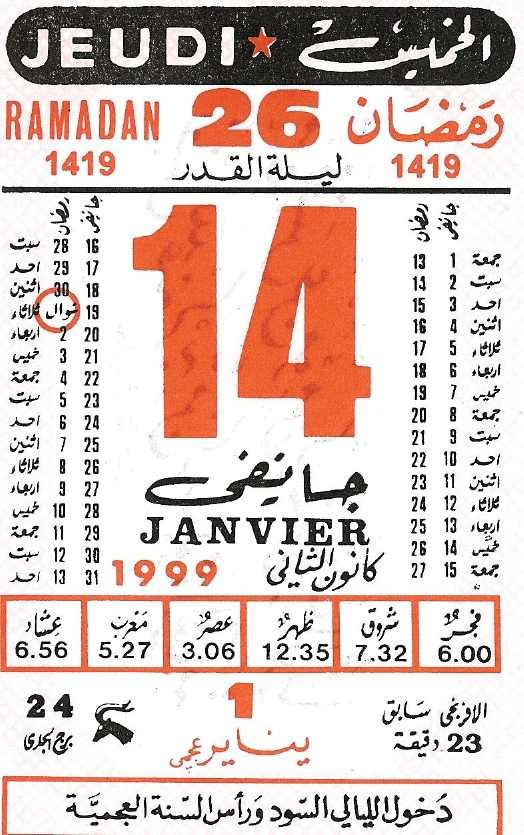
A page from a Tunisian calendar, showing the correspondence of 1 Yennayer ʿajmi (in red on bottom) with 14 January of the Gregorian calendar. The writing on the bottom signals that it is ʿajmi New Year's Day and that al-lyali al-sud ("the black nights") are beginning.

The coldest period is made up by 20 "white nights" (Berber: iḍan imellalen, Arabic: al-lyali al-biḍ), from 12 to 31 dujamber (Gregorian dates: 25 December - 13 January), and 20 "black nights" (Berber: iḍan tiberkanin/isṭṭafen, Arabic al-lyali al-sud), beginning on the first day of yennayer, corresponding to the Gregorian 14 January.

=== Yennayer ===
The first day of the year is celebrated in various ways in the different parts of North Africa. A widespread tradition is a meal with particular foods, which vary from region to region (such as a couscous with seven vegetables). In some regions, it is marked by the sacrifice of an animal (usually a chicken). In January 2018, Algeria declared Yennayer a national holiday – a landmark policy considering how the Amazigh are marginalized in Northern Africa.

A characteristic trait of this festivity, which often blurs with the Islamic Day of Ashura, is the presence, in many regions, of ritual invocations with formulas like bennayu, babiyyanu, bu-ini, etc. Such expressions, according to many scholars, may be derived from the ancient bonus annus (happy new year) wishes.

A curious aspect of the Yennayer celebrations concerns the date of New Year's Day. Though once this anniversary fell everywhere on 14 January, because of a likely mistake introduced by some Berber cultural associations very active in recovering customs on the verge of extinction, at present in a wide part of Algeria it is common opinion that the date of "Berber New Year's Day" is 12 January and not the 14th. Previously the celebration at the 12, two days before the traditional one, it had been explicitly signaled in the city of Oran.

=== El Azara ===
El Azara (Arabic: العزارة) is the period of the year extending, according to the Berber calendar, from 3 to 13 February and known by a climate sometimes hot, sometimes cold.

=== Lḥusum/Imbarken ===
Before the cold ends completely and spring begins fully, there is a period of the year that is very feared. It consists of ten days straddling the months of furar and mars (the last five of the former and the first five of the latter), and it is characterised by strong winds. It is said that, during this term, one should suspend many activities (agricultural and artisan), should not marry nor go out during the night, leaving instead full scope to mysterious powers, which in that period are particularly active and celebrate their weddings. Due to a linguistic taboo, in Djerba these creatures are called imbarken, i.e. "the blessed ones", whence this period takes its name.

Jamrat el Ma (Arabic: جمرة الماء), "embers of the sea", 27 February, is marked by a rise in sea temperature.

Jamrat el Trab (Arabic: جمرة التراب), "land embers" in English, is the period from 6 to 10 March and known to be marked by a mixture of heavy rain and sunny weather. The term jamrat (literally 'coal') is in reference to the warm state of the earth during this period .

=== Ssmaym ===
Like the strong winter cold, the Dog Days also last 40 days, from 12 yulyuz (25 July) to 20 ghusht (2 September). The apical moment of the period is the first of ghusht "August" (also the name awussu, widespread in Tunisia and Libya, seems to date back to Latin augustus). On this date, particular rites are performed, which manifestly derive from pre-Islamic, and even pre-Christian, traditions. They consist, in particular, of bonfires (which in many locations take place around the summer solstice: a custom already condemned as Pagan by St. Augustine), or water rituals, like those, common in the coastal towns of Tunisia and Tripolitania, that provide to dive in the seawaters for three nights, in order to preserve one's health. In these ceremonies, whole families used to enter the water, bringing with them even their pets. Though the rite has been revisited in an Islamic frame (in those nights, the water of the Zamzam Well, in Mecca, would spill over, and in the sea there would be beneficial sweet water waves), many call this celebration "the nights of the error". It was in fact usual that, in order to achieve fertility and prosperity, men and women copulated among the waves.

=== Iweǧǧiben ===
Another important period for the agricultural calendar is that of the ploughing. In this context, a date considered fundamental is the 17th of (k)tuber, in which one may start ploughing his fields. In Arabic, this period is called ḥertadem, that is "Adam's ploughing", because in that date the common ancestor of humanity is said to have begun his agricultural works.

== Influences from the Islamic calendar ==
Following centuries-long contacts with the Arab-Islamic culture, the celebrations linked to the Julian calendar have been sometimes integrated into the Islamic calendar, leading to the suppression of some traditional holidays or to the creation of duplicates.

The most evident example are the celebrations for the new year, which in many cases have been transferred to the first Islamic month, i.e. Muḥarram, and more precisely to the ʿĀshūrā’, which falls on the 10th day of that month. This holiday has an important mournful meaning in the Shia Islam, but it is substantially ignored among Sunnis. Many studies have shown the relationships between the joyful celebration of this holiday in North Africa and the ancient New Year's Day celebrations.

Arabic and Berber names of the Islamic months

	Arabic name	Berber name
1	Muḥàrram	babiyannu (Ouargla) ʿashura' (Djerba)
2	Sàfar	u deffer ʿashura'
3	Rabiʿ al-awwal	elmilud
4	Rabiʿ al-thani	u deffer elmilud
5	Jumada al-awwal	melghes (Djerba)
6	Jumada al-thani	asgenfu n twessarin "the rest (the waiting) of the old women" (Ouargla) sh-shaher n Fadma (Djerba)
7	Rajab	twessarin "the old women"
8	shaʿaban	asgenfu n remdan "the rest (the waiting) of Ramadan" (Ouargla)
9	Ramadan	sh-shaher n uzum "the month of the fasting" (Djerba)
10	Shawwal	tfaska tameshkunt "the little holiday" (Djerba)
11	dhu al-qaʿida	u jar-asneth "that between the two (holidays)" (Djerba)
12	Dhu al-Hijjah	tfaska tameqqart "the big holiday" (Djerba)

== Older calendars ==
The Berber months
Name	Meaning
tayyuret tezwaret	The first small moon
tayyuret tegg^{w}erat	The last small moon
yardut	?
sinwa	?
tasra tezwaret	The first herd
tasra tegg^{w}erat	The last herd
awdayeɣet yezwaren	The first antelope babies
awdayeɣet yegg^{w}eran	The last antelope babies
awzimet yezwaren	The first gazelle babies
awzimet yegg^{w}eran	The last gazelle babies
ayssi / aysi	?
nim	?

Not much is known about the division of time among the ancient Berbers. Some elements of a pre-Islamic, and almost certainly a pre-Roman calendar, emerge from some medieval writings, analyzed by Nico van den Boogert. Some correspondences with the traditional Tuareg calendar suggest that in antiquity there existed, with some degree of diffusion, a Berber time computation, organized on native bases.

There are not enough elements to reconstruct this calendar fully, but known characteristics include many month names' appearing in couples (in the Tuareg world, even in triplets), which suggests a time division different from the present one, made up of months of about 30 days.

Some further information, although difficult to specify and correlate with the situation in the rest of North Africa, may be deduced from what is known about time computation among the Guanches of the Canary Islands. According to a 17th-century manuscript by Tomás Marín de Cubas, they

computed their year, called Acano, by lunations of 29 days (suns) beginning from the new moon. It began in summer, when the sun enters in Cancer, on June 21: at the first conjunction (at the first new moon after the Summer solstice) they celebrated nine festival days for the crop.

The same manuscript states (although somewhat obscurely) that graphical-pictorical records of such calendarial events (tara) were made on different supports, and on this basis some modern scholars identified alleged descriptions of astronomical events connected to annual cycles in a series of geometric paintings in some caves of Gran Canaria island, but the results of these studies are for now highly speculative.

The name of only one month is known in the native language, handed down as Beñesmet. It seems it was the second month of the year, corresponding to August. Such a name, in case it was made up by something like *wen "that of" + (e)smet (or (e)zmet?), may correspond, in the list of medieval Berber month names, with the ninth and tenth months, awzimet (properly aw "baby of" + zimet "gazelle"). But data are too scarce for this hypothesis to be deepened.

== Computation of the years ==
The traditional Berber calendar was not linked to an era with respect to which years were calculated. Where traditional ways to compute the years have been preserved (Tuareg civilization), years are not expressed with numbers but each of them has a name characterizing it.

Starting from the 1960s, however, on the initiative of the Académie Berbère of Paris, some Berbers have begun computing the years starting from 950 BC, the approximate date of the rising into power of the first Libyan Pharaoh in Egypt, Shoshenq I, whom they identified as the first prominent Berber in history (he is recorded as being of Libyan origin). For example, the Gregorian year 2026 corresponds to the 2976th year of the Berber calendar.

This innovation has been adopted with conviction by many supporters of the Berber culture and is now a part of the cultural heritage of this people, fully integrated in the system of traditional customs related to the North-African calendar.

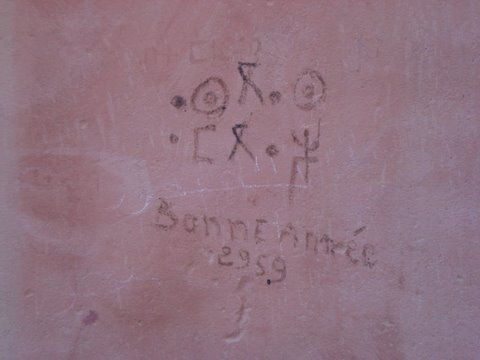
Photo taken on 31 December 2007 near Tafraout (Morocco), with the writings aseggas ameggaz ("good year") in Tifinagh and bonne année 2959 ("good year 2959") in French. Note the 1-year mistake, as 2959 corresponds to the Gregorian year 2009.

== Bibliography ==
- "Il calendario degli uomini liberi", Africa, Epicentro (Ferrara), year V, no. 16 (January/February 2000), pp. 30–33 (in attachment: a Berber calendar for 2000)
- Achab, Ramdane (1996). La néologie lexicale berbère: 1945-1995. M.S. — Ussun amazigh (in French). Vol. 9. Paris - Louvain: Peeters Publishers. ISBN 978-9068318104.
- Saïd Bouterfa, Yannayer - Taburt u swgas, ou le symbole de Janus, Alger, El-Musk, 2002 – ISBN 9961-928-04-0
- Gioia Chiauzzi, Cicli calendariali nel Magreb, 2 vols., Naples (Istituto Universitario Orientale), 1988
- Jeannine Drouin, "Calendriers berbères", in: S. Chaker & A. Zaborski (eds.), Études berbères et chamito-sémitiques. Mélanges offerts à K.-G. Prasse, Paris-Louvain, Peeters, 2000, ISBN 90-429-0826-2, pp. 113–128
- Henri Genevois, Le calendrier agraire et sa composition, "Le Fichier Périodique" no. 125, 1975
- Henri Genevois, Le rituel agraire, "Le Fichier Périodique" 127, 1975, pp. 1–48
- Mohand Akli Haddadou, Almanach berbère - assegwes Imazighen, Algiers (Editions INAS) 2002 – ISBN 9961-762-05-3
- H. R. Idris, "Fêtes chrétiennes célébrées en Ifrîqiya à l'époque ziride", in Revue Africaine 98 (1954), pp. 261–276
- Emile Laoust, Mots et choses berbères, Paris 1920
- Umberto Paradisi, "I tre giorni di Awussu a Zuara (Tripolitania)", AION n.s. 14 (1964), pp. 415–9
- Serra, Luigi (1990). "Awussu". Encyclopédie Berbère (in French). Vol. 8. Aix-en-Provence: Editions Edisud. pp. 1198–1200. ISBN 9782857444619.
- Jean Servier, Les portes de l'Année. Rites et symboles. L'Algérie dans la tradition méditerranéenne, Paris, R. Laffont, 1962 (new edition: Monaco, Le Rocher, 1985 ISBN 2268003698)
- Nouh-Mefnoune, Ahmed; Abdessalam, Brahim (2011). Dictionnaire mozabite-français (in French)
