= Tuareg in Burkina Faso =

Total population
- 1,500,000

Languages
- Tuareg languages (some knowledge of French)

Religion
- Sunni Islam

Tuareg in Burkina Faso are Burkina Faso citizens of Tuareg descent or persons of Tuareg descent residing in Burkina Faso. Ethnic Tuareg in Burkina Faso are believed to number around 1,500,000.

== See also ==
- Tuareg
