= Standard Moroccan Amazigh =

Standardized national variety of Berber used in Morocco

- Standard Moroccan Tamazight
- ⵜⴰⵎⴰⵣⵉⵖⵜ ⵜⴰⵏⴰⵡⴰⵢⵜ tamaziɣt tanawayt
- Native to: Morocco
- Date: 2011
- Language family: Afro-Asiatic: Berber; Northern; Standard Moroccan Amazigh
- Writing system: Tifinagh

Official status
- Official language in: Morocco
- Regulated by: Royal Institute of Amazigh Culture

Language codes
- ISO 639-2: zgh
- ISO 639-3: zgh
- Glottolog: stan1324

- Person: Amaziɣ (male); Tamaziɣt (female)
- People: Imaziɣen (males or males and females); Timaziɣin (females)
- Language: Tamaziɣt

Standard Moroccan Amazigh, (Note: ⵜⴰⵎⴰⵣⵉⵖⵜ ⵜⴰⵏⴰⵡⴰⵢⵜ, tamaziɣt tanawayt Arabic: الأمازيغية المعيارية المغربية) also known as Standard Moroccan Tamazight or Standard Moroccan Berber, is a standardized language developed by the Royal Institute of Amazigh Culture (IRCAM) in Morocco by combining features of Tashelhit, Central Atlas Tamazight, and Tarifit, the three major Amazigh languages in Morocco. It has been an official language of Morocco since 2011.

Standard Moroccan Amazigh is typically referred to as Tamazight, Amazigh, or Berber, although these terms can also be used to refer to any other Amazigh language, or to Amazigh languages as a whole, including those outside Morocco.

== History ==
As of 2024, 24.8 percent of Moroccans spoke Tamazight, referring to either Tashelhit, Central Atlas Tamazight, or Tarifit, as a native language. Following the independence of Morocco in 1956, Amazigh activists began calling for greater inclusion of Tamazight in official and public contexts. Cultural associations also began demanding the standardization of Tamazight in the 1980s.

In 2001, the creation of IRCAM, and its role in teaching Tamazight in the classroom, was announced. This development required the standardization of Tamazight writing and the creation of dictionaries, textbooks, and teaching materials. This was followed in 2003 by the introduction of Amazigh-language teaching in 120 schools and the adoption of Tifinagh as the official script. In 2004, the script gained international recognition. In 2008, the Royal Institute issued a grammar reference book and approved plans for an Amazigh-language television channel, which began broadcasting in 2009.

In 2011, the Moroccan constitution was amended to include Tamazight as an official language.

In November 2023, Standard Moroccan Amazigh Wikipedia (zgh) was officially accepted and launched as an independent Wikipedia project.

== Development ==
To develop Standard Moroccan Amazigh, IRCAM analyzed written sources of Tashelhit, Central Atlas Tamazight, and Tarifit. In this process, 3584 verbs were added to the standardized vocabulary. Words and syntactic structures with identical meanings across languages were added as synonyms; for example, both taddart, the Central Atlas Tamazight word for house, and tigammi, the Tashelhit word for house, mean "house" in Standard Moroccan Amazigh.

To add words not found in any of Tashelhit, Central Atlas Tamazight, or Tarifit, IRCAM borrowed from Amazigh languages from outside Morocco when possible, and otherwise derived a new word from the existing Tamazight lexicon.

=== Orthography ===
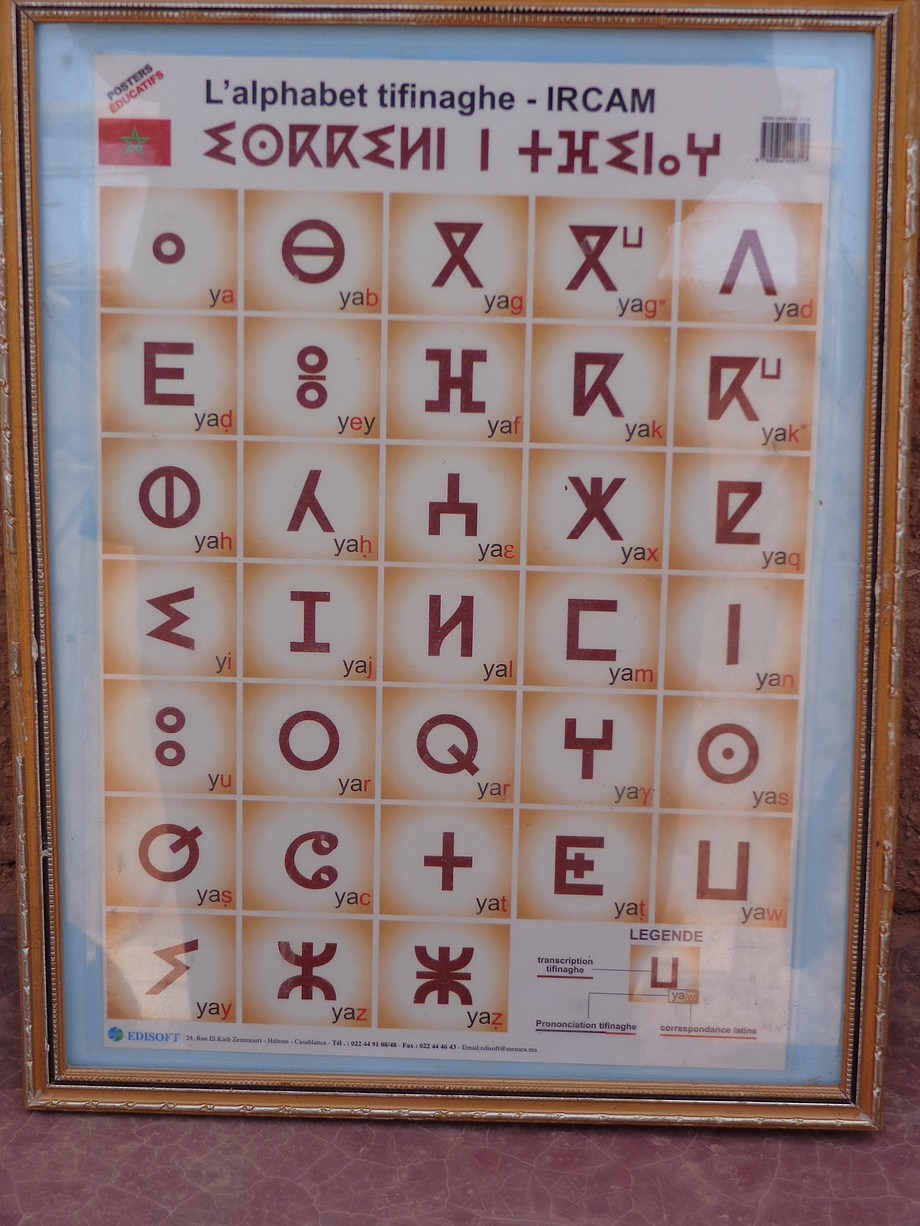
IRCAM Neo Tifinagh alphabet

Tamazight has typically been written in the Arabic script, the Berber Latin alphabet, or Tifinagh. As part of the standardization process, in 2003, IRCAM chose Tifinagh, referring to Neo-Tifinagh, as Standard Moroccan Amazigh's orthography. The decision was controversial both inside and outside the deciding committee, having been made for political, rather than practical, reasons; most Moroccan speakers of Tamazight do not use Tifinagh.

The version of Neo-Tifinagh used by IRCAM is slightly different from other versions. As of 2016, the use of Tifinagh has been restricted primarily to public signage and other culturally conspicuous uses; it is not widely used in education or media.

== Criticism ==
The 2003 adoption of Tifinagh was met with widespread criticism, particularly among Amazigh activists, who find the choice impractical and limiting in the promotion of Tamazight. Most Moroccan speakers of Amazigh use the Latin alphabet, rather than Tifinagh, and the Latin alphabet is the official script used for Amazigh languages outside of Morocco. As a result, the adoption of Tifinagh is seen as limiting both within Morocco, and in connecting Morocco with broader Amazigh culture in North Africa, with the decision's harshest critics viewing it as an intentional ploy by the government. Linguist Salem Chaker argued that the decision was "dangerous" and intended to "[drive] this transitional period of Amazigh writing and teaching into a sure dead end." However, most non-activists opposed the official adoption of the Latin alphabet for Amazigh, and a 2011 survey found that 45.5% of respondents agreed that Tifinagh was the most appropriate script for writing Tamazight.

In practice, while all three languages are used in primary school textbooks, Tashelhit otherwise appears to be the main basis of the standard used in Amazigh-language materials produced by the Royal Institute of Amazigh Culture, supplemented by numerous puristic neologisms. This has led some critics to argue that Morocco's official "language policy" is marginalizing the northern and eastern Berber languages of Morocco, and tacitly making all the Berber languages of Morocco 'non-standard', particularly those whose speakers do not identify with any of the three major languages used by IRCAM, such as Iznasen in the far northeast, Senhaja-Ktama in the north, Eastern Atlas Tamazight in central Morocco, Figuig, and Southeastern Berber.

== See also ==
- Libyco-Berber alphabet
- 2011 Moroccan constitutional referendum
- Languages of Morocco
- Standard Algerian Amazigh
- Berber Languages
