= El Koudia El Beida =

- Rural commune and town
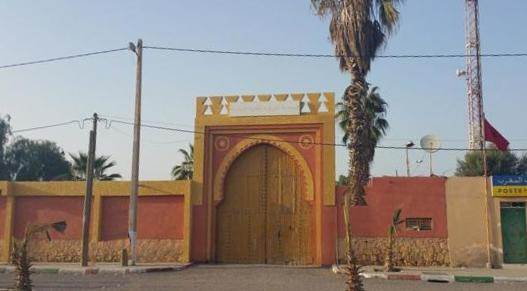
- Interactive map of El Koudia El Beida
- Country: Morocco
- Region: Souss-Massa-Drâa
- Province: Taroudant Province

Population (2004)
  - Total: 19,989
- Time zone: UTC+0 (GMT)

El Koudia El Beida is a small town and rural commune in Taroudant Province of the Souss-Massa-Drâa region of Morocco. At the time of the 2004 census, the commune had a total population of 19,989 people living in 3085 households.
