= Moroccan Dahir =

Royal decree in Morocco

A Dahir (Arabic: ظهير, romanized: Ẓahīr) is a decree made by the king of Morocco.

== Examples ==
Date	Monarch	Motive
1698	Ismail Ibn Sharif	Allowing the Franciscans to establish a mission in Meknes to care for captive Christians
4 June 1864	Muhammad IV	Promoting free trade with foreign countries
November 1892	Hassan I	Establishing the first domestic organized postal service
February 1907	Abdelaziz	Establishing the monopolistic powers in issuing currency the Moroccan state bank
12 August 1913	Yusef bin Hassan	Criminal proceedings
11 March 1915	Yusef bin Hassan	Education
17 November 1915	Yusef bin Hassan	Creation of the 5-branch Seal of Solomon Flag of Morocco.
8 November 1919	Yusef bin Hassan	Creation of Compagnie de Transports au Maroc
1 November 1926	Yusef bin Hassan	Bibliothèque Générale et Archives (the Moroccan national library) becomes a public establishment.
16 May 1930	Mohammed V	Berber justice (known as Berber Dahir)
26 April 1956	Mohammed V	Establishment of the Ministry of Foreign Affairs.
16 May 1956	Mohammed V	Establishment of the General Directorate for National Security (State police)
16 July 1957	Mohammed V	Trade unions
6 September 1958	Mohammed V	Moroccan nationality code
21 July 1959	Mohammed V	Founding and organization of Moroccan universities.
23 June 1960	Mohammed V	Organization of communes
24 October 1962	Hassan II	Agricultural chambers (modified on 26 August 1992)
12 September 1963	Hassan II	Organization of prefectures and provinces
13 November 1963	Hassan II	Education
16 June 1971	Hassan II	Organization of regions of Morocco
30 September 1976	Hassan II	New communal organization
2 April 1997	Hassan II	Decentralization, reorganization of the 16 regions of Morocco
17 October 2001	Mohammed VI	N°1-01-299: Creation of the Royal Institute of Amazigh Culture
3 October 2002	Mohammed VI	The communal chart
10 April 2004	Mohammed VI	Creation of the Equity and Reconciliation Commission
