= Libyco-Berber alphabet =

Abjad writing system

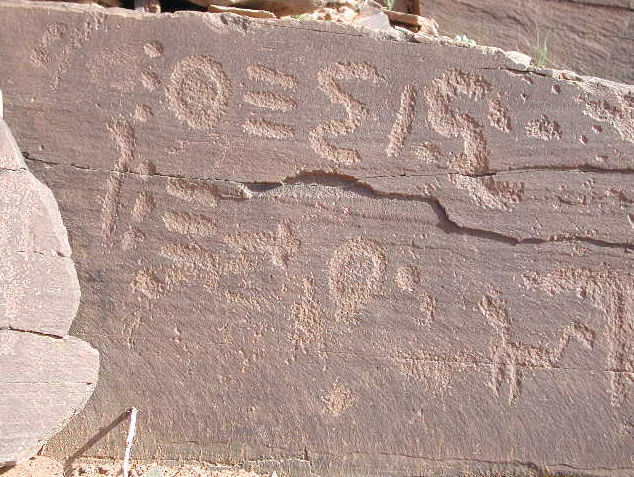
- Script type: Abjad
- Period: Sometime during the first millennium BC to the 4th-7th century AD
- Direction: Various, but usually bottom-to-top or right-to-left
- Languages: Berber languages ? Guanche ? Garamantian

Related scripts
- Parent systems: Egyptian hieroglyphs: Proto-Sinaitic script; Phoenician alphabet ?; Libyco-Berber alphabet
- Child systems: Tifinagh (Tuareg Tifinagh)

The Libyco-Berber alphabet is an abjad writing system that was used during the first millennium BC by various Berber peoples of North Africa and the Canary Islands, to write ancient varieties of the Berber language (possibly Numidian language).

The use of the Libyco-Berber alphabet died out in northern areas during or after the reign of the Roman Empire and Byzantine Empire, but it spread south into the Sahara desert and evolved there into the Tuareg Tifinagh alphabet used by the Tuareg Berbers to this day.

It is also known as the Numidian script or the Old Libyan script, the point being to avoid an assumption that Numidian has any continuity with any surviving modern Berber language.

== Origin ==
The origin of the Libyco-Berber script is still debated by academic researchers. The leading theories regarding its origins posit it as being either a heavily modified version of the Phoenician alphabet, or a local invention influenced by the latter, with the most supported view being that it derived from a local prototype conceptually inspired by a Phoenician or archaic Semitic model. Other unlikely explanations include Greek, Punic or South Arabian influences.

One of the oldest known variants of the script is found in inscriptions in Dugga dating from Numidian times.

== Description ==
Before, during, and after the existence of the ancient Berber kingdoms of Numidia (northern Algeria, 202 BC–40 BC) and Mauretania (northern Morocco, 3rd century BC – 44 AD) many inscriptions were engraved using the Libyco-Berber script, although the overwhelming majority of the found ones were simple funerary scripts, with rock art, cave art, graffiti, and even a few official governmental and possibly religious inscriptions have been found.

The Libyco-Berber script was a pure abjad; it had no distinct vowels. However, it had equivalents for "w" and "y", and "h" was possibly used as an "a" too. Gemination was not marked. The writing was usually from the bottom to the top, although right-to-left, and even other orders, were also found. The letters took different forms when written vertically than when they were written horizontally. The letters were highly geometrical.

Libyco-Berber inventory (compared to equivalent Tifinagh letters by sound):
Transliteration	E. Libyco-Berber (Dougga)	Tifinagh (Ahaggar)	Neo-Tifinagh	Comparable
b		ⵀ	ⴱ	𓉐 𐤁 ܒ ب
g		ⴳ	ⴳ	𐤂
d		ⴷ,ⴸ	ⴷ	𓉿 𐤃 𐪈 𐩨 Δ
h		ⵂ	ⵀ	𐤄 𐌄 𐤇 ࠇ
w		ⵓ	ⵡ	𐤅 𐌅 Ϝ Ⴅ ወ
z^{1}		ⵋ	ⵊ	𐤆 𐪘 ዘ 𐌆
ṭ		ⵟ	ⵟ	𐤈 ܛ
y		ⵉ	ⵢ	𓂝 𐡉 ی
k		ⴾ	ⴽ	𓂧 𐤊 K
l		ⵍ	ⵍ	𓌅 𐤋 𐡋 ל
m		ⵎ	ⵎ	𐡌 𐪃
n	LB vertical N	ⵏ	ⵏ	𐤍 𐡍
s^{1}	LB vertical N		ⵚ	𐤎 ξ ס
f		ⴼ	ⴼ	𐤐 Π
s^{2}		ⵙ	ⵙ	𓇑 𐤑 Ϻ 𐌎
q/ɣ?	?	ⵗ/ⵈ	ⵖ/ⵇ	𓊃 𐤒 𐩤
r		ⵔ	ⵔ	𓁶 𐤓 𐪇 ܪ ረ
s^{3}		ⵛ	ⵛ	𐤔 𐡔 𐪆 Ϲ
t		ⵜ	ⵜ	𓏴 𐤕 ተ
z^{2}	LB vertical Z	ⵣ	ⵣ	𐤆 𐌆 ⵋ
s^{4}				
z^{3}		ⵌ	ⵥ	𐤔 𐡔

== Variations ==
There are multiple variants of the Libyco-Berber script; some studies divide these varieties into eastern and western, while others have identified more than 25 "dialects" grouped in 5 different families.

The eastern variant was used in what is now Constantine and the Aurès regions of Algeria and in Tunisia, and to an extent Kabylia. It is the best-deciphered variant, due to the discovery of several Numidian bilingual inscriptions in Libyco-Berber and Punic (notably so-called KAI 100 and 101 at Dougga in Tunisia). Since 1843, 22 letters out of the 24 have been deciphered.

The Western variant was used along the Mediterranean coast from Kabylia to the Canary Islands. It used 13 supplementary letters. As of 2002, much of the Western variant has yet to be deciphered. Western variant signs have also been observed to be used in combination with possible pictograms of animals.

== Inscriptions ==
The Libyco-Berber script is found in thousands of stone inscriptions and engravings throughout Morocco, northern Algeria, Tunisia, northern Libya and the Canary Islands, with inscriptions of the later (transitional) Saharan variant in rocky outcrops in Mali and Niger.

Apart from thousands of small inscriptions, some of the best known and significant Libyco-Berber inscriptions are in the Massinissa Temple (discovered in 1904) and the Prince Ateban Mausoleum in Dougga / Thugga (TBGG), northern Tunisia. Other significant Libyco-Berber inscription are the Azib N'Ikkis and the Oukaimeden, both found in the High-Atlas Mountains of Morocco.

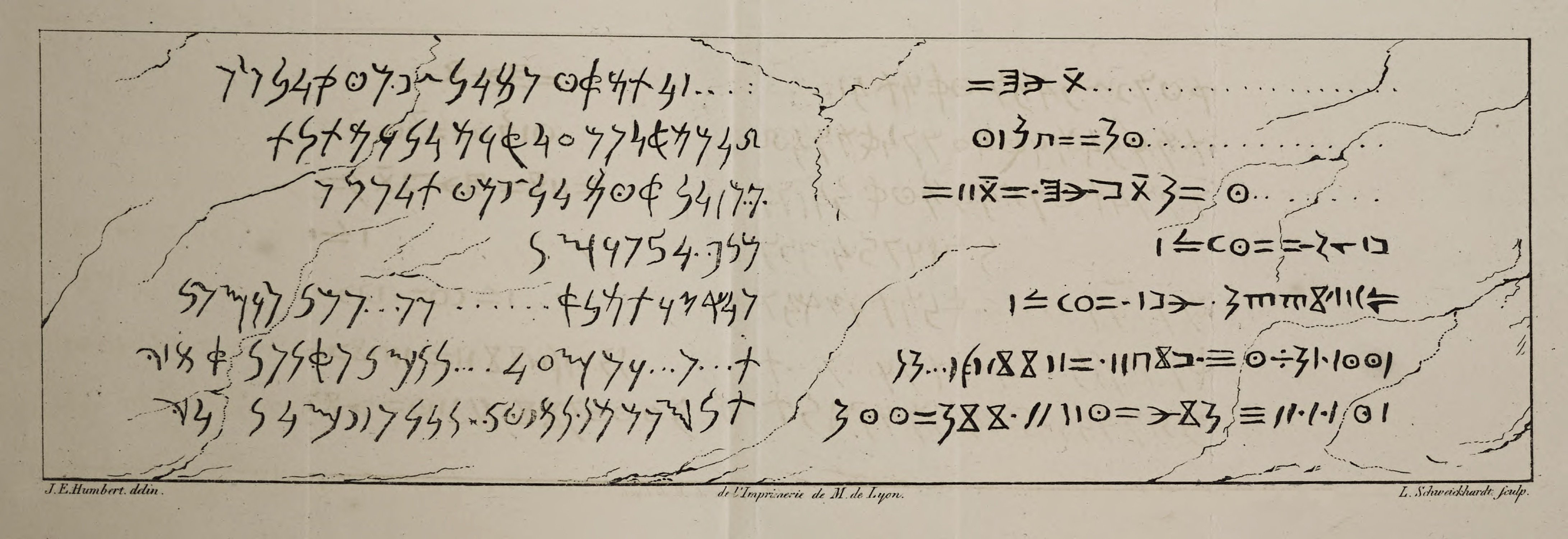
The first published sketch of the bilingual (Left: Punic. Right: Libyco-Berber) Ateban Mausoleum inscription of Dougga, Tunisia (Jean Emile Humbert)

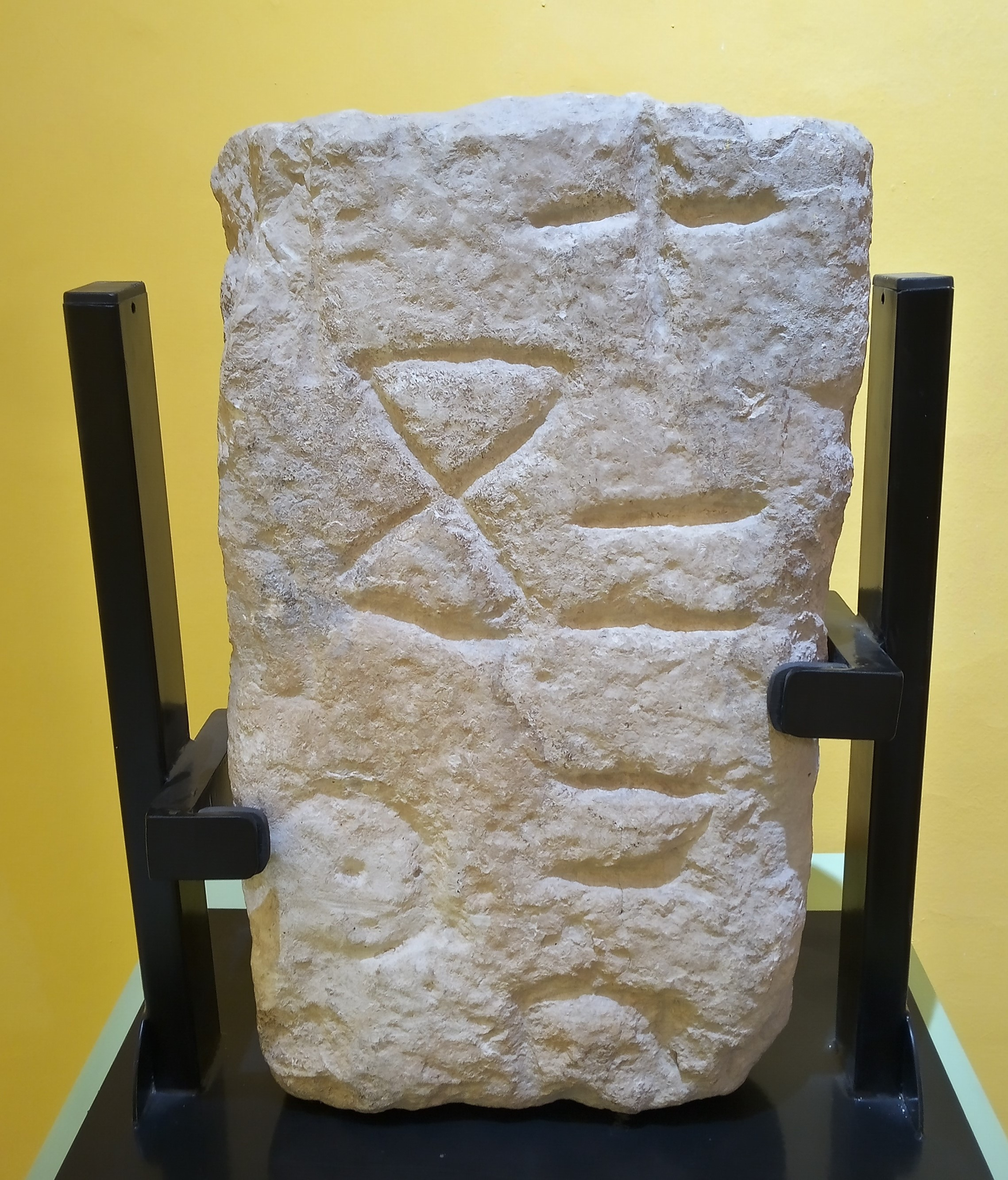
Vertical Libyco-berber "Eastern" alphabet on a funerary stele found in Sidi Ali Bahloul, Jedilane-Rouha region, Tunisia (Sbeitla's archeological museum)

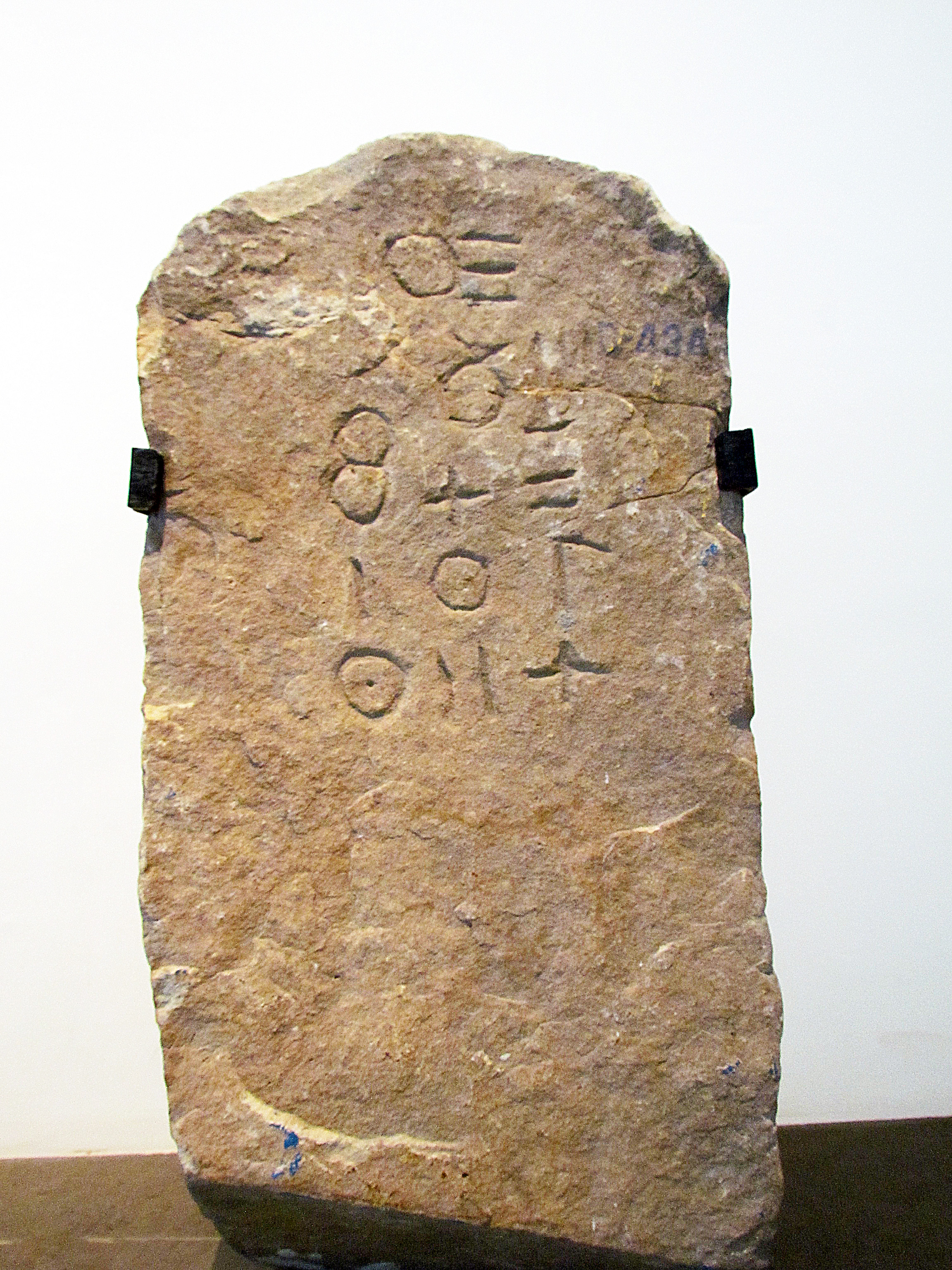
Numidian stela in Bardo National Museum (Tunis)

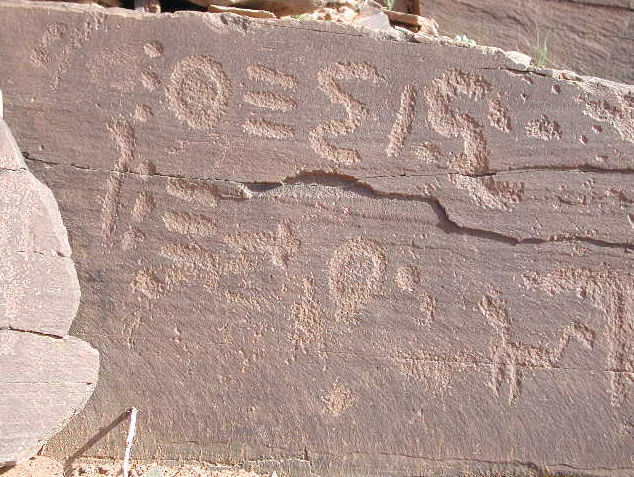
Writing on mountain along Wadi Draa in Fum ash-Shanna, Tinzouline, Zagora Province, Morocco
