= Petimezas =

Petimezas or Petmezas (Greek: Πετ[ι]μεζάς) is the name of a notable family of Greek armatoloi from the region of Kalavryta who played a significant role in the Greek War of Independence.

Notable members include:

- Anagnostis Petimezas (1765–1822), Greek revolutionary leader
- Athanasios Petimezas (1767–1804), Greek armatolos
- Konstantinos Petimezas (1764–1824), Greek revolutionary leader
- Nikolaos Petimezas (1790–1865), Greek revolutionary leader
- Vasileios Petimezas (1785–1872), Greek revolutionary leader and politician

== Sources ==
- Doganis, Th. (1930). Μεγάλη Στρατιωτικὴ καὶ Ναυτικὴ Ἐγκυκλοπαιδεία. Tόμος Πέμπτος: Νάβα–Σαρακηνοί [Great Military and Naval Encyclopaedia. Volume V: Nave–Saracens] (in Greek). Athens: Ἔκδοσις Μεγάλης Στρατιωτικῆς καὶ Ναυτικῆς Ἐγκυκλοπαιδείας. pp. 314–315. OCLC 31255024.
