= Battle of Mega Spilaio =

1827 battle

- Part of the Greek War of Independence
Date	24 June 1827
Location	Mega Spilaio Monastery, Kalavryta, Achaea, Morea Eyalet, Ottoman Empire
Result	Greek victory

Belligerents
Greek revolutionaries	Ottoman Empire

Commanders and leaders
Nikolaos Petimezas; Photakos; Gerasimos Torolos and other chieftains	Ibrahim Pasha of Egypt; Deli Ahmed

Strength
800	6,000

Casualties and losses
1 dead and a few wounded	More than 300 dead and wounded

The Battle of Mega Spilaio of Achaia was a military episode of the Greek War of Independence, an event that took place during the campaign of Ibrahim of Egypt against the Christian populations of the Peloponnese in the summer of 1827 - a critical year for the revolution. The outcome of the battle was positive for Greek weapons and led to the withdrawal of the Turkish-Egyptian troops from the wider area of Kalavryta.

== History ==
Since early 1827, Ibrahim had been conducting a campaign throughout the northwestern Peloponnese, with the aim of obtaining the inhabitants' declaration of submission (prayer cards). The Egyptian marshal had this time adopted a milder tactic compared to his previous operations, during which he resorted to extensive massacres, looting, arson, captivity and destruction of infrastructure, in order to ensure the disappearance of any revolutionary hotbed. The declarations of submission of the population (proskim charters) were sent to Constantinople to be presented by the Sultan to the Great Powers (who were preparing an agreement to end the bloodshed and impose the independence of Greece), as proof that the Greek revolution had been defeated and that there was no longer any issue to be resolved. By mid-year, more and more provinces had agreed to submit in order to avoid the massacre, while the only chieftain who had still managed to resist Ibrahim's plan was Kolokotronis. Without the official support of the Greek administration, the "Old Man of Morea" had succeeded in developing a wide resistance network and with a combination of threats ("fire and axe to the pilgrims"), admonitions, exhortations and recourse to the patriotic pride of the populations, he kept the revolutionary activity active.

== The battle ==
On 17 June 1827, Ibrahim arrived in the Kalavryta region with 13,000 troops, along with Nenekos at the head of 2,000 "pilgrims" and camped at the "Salmaina" position, near the village of Vysoka (now Skepasto). His aim was to capture the Monastery of the Mega Spilaio, in which many civilians had found refuge. The fathers of the Monastery, realizing the danger, asked for help from Kolokotronis who was in Corinth. As soon as he received the message from the prisoners, Kolokotronis hurried to order N. Petmezas to head to the Monastery with 600 fighters, while he sent his personal adjutant Photakos to assist him with another 100 men.

The above forces were joined, in addition, by the bodies of Gennaios, Plapoutas, Petmezas and Panagos Notaras. The defenders were also reinforced by 100 monks led by Gerasimos Torolos, former abbot of the Monastery, as well as the men of Nikolaos Fragakis and Andreas Sardelianos, the latter being killed during the conflict. On 19 June, the Egyptian commander-in-chief sent a letter to the leadership of the Monastery, in which, offering significant rewards, he requested the submission of the monks, who, as expected, refused. On 21 June, Ibrahim was forced to send a second letter to the Great Cave, trying with threats to "bring to mind" the monks. The letter was as follows:

"Your Excellency, the Abbot and other priests and monks of Mega Spilaio.

I note that we have been with our most high master, Ibrahim Pasha, in the plain of Kalavryta for four days now and we have great orders and preparations for the siege of the monastery of Mega Spilaio. And as we expect that the terrain and the bombs and enough equipment will come to us soon and after one or two days we will throw our troops around the siege of the monastery, in these places I therefore declare to you that you should be sad that your monastery does not suffer and fall into ruin and that which in the past did not fall into ruin, does not suffer and fall into ruin: and now, moreover, the most unknown (the uneducated) from your word they came and worshiped our master and saved their villages and so many people and their lives and their property. Well, you are more knowledgeable than them in your word and you will think about everything better. I am not writing to you above, you will also be informed from the letter of my friend Photila, he will advise you himself. Leader, if you want to think, this movement of the Romans will not come to a head. Well, like a wise man where you are, think deeply that you will not find a good end and you will be defeated. You will know that what I write to you, I write with the definition of our most high master and you will respond to me in what I write to you.

Sami Effendi. Segneztip Effendi

21 June 1827

The next day, the monks, after deliberating, responded with a letter that they sent the following:

"Your Excellency, Commander of the Ottoman Chariots, greetings.

We have received your letter and seen what you write, we know that you have been in the plain of Kalavryta for many days and that you have all the means of war. It is impossible for us to worship, because we have sworn to our faith, either to be freed or to die fighting, and according to our faith, the sacred oath of our homeland cannot be broken. However, we advise you to go and fight in other places, because if you come here to fight us and defeat us, it is not a great evil, because you will defeat the priests, but if you are defeated, which we inevitably hope for, with the power of God, because we have a strong position and it will be a disgrace to you and then the Greeks will take heart and will chase you everywhere. We also advise you, do as a wise man what is in your best interest, we also have letters from the council and from the commander-in-chief Theodore Kolokotron, that in any case he will send us much help, soldiers and food and that either we will be freed quickly or we will die according to the sacred oath of our Fatherland.

DAMASKINOS

The abbot and with me priests and monks on 22 June 1827, Mega Spilaion"

After this decisive response from the fathers of the Monastery, what everyone was waiting for happened. On 24 June, Ibrahim launched a fierce attack against the Monastery with a very strong force of 6,000 men consisting of 4,000 Ottomans under Deli Ahmed of Patras and 2,000 Greek "worshippers" under the traitor Nenekos. After several hours of fighting and while night had already fallen, not managing to break the resistance of the Greeks who were fighting passionately inside and outside the Monastery, the Turkish-Egyptians were forced to retreat and head for Tripolitsa, their base, leaving behind at least 300 dead.

== Sources ==
- Dionisios Kokkinos, The Greek Revolution, volume 6, Melissa Publications, Athens 1974, pp. 125-6: "Into the Mega Spilaio"
