= Vasileios Petimezas (1785–1872) =

Greek politician

Lieutenant General Vasileios Petimezas
- Βασίλειος Πετ[ι]μεζάς
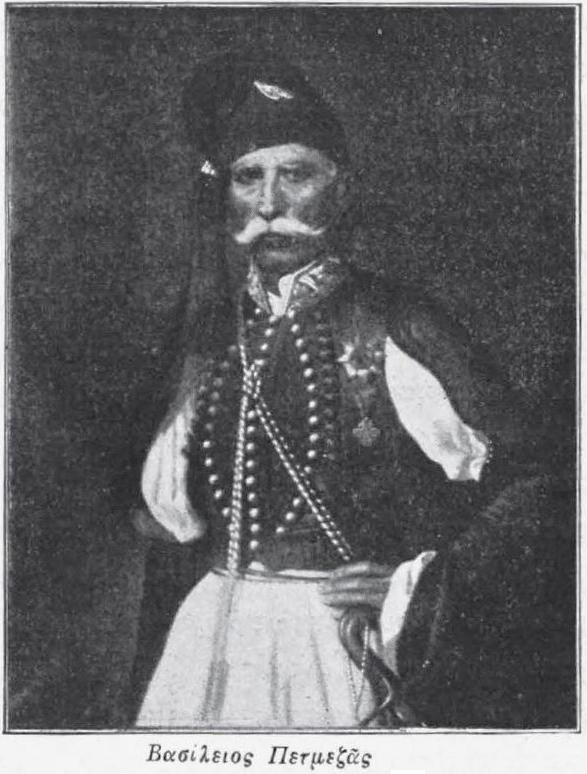
- Petmezas in Royal Phalanx uniform
- Born: c. 1785; Soudena, Morea Eyalet, Ottoman Empire (now Greece)
- Died: 1872; Kingdom of Greece
- Relatives: Athanasios Petimezas (father); Nikolaos Petimezas (brother)
- Military career
- Allegiance: United Kingdom; First Hellenic Republic; Kingdom of Greece
- Branch: British Army; Hellenic Army
- Rank: Lieutenant General
- Unit: 1st Regiment Greek Light Infantry
- Conflicts: Napoleonic Wars; Adriatic Campaign; Siege of Santa Maura; War of the Sixth Coalition; Siege of Genoa; Greek War of Independence; Battle of Dervenakia
- Other work: Representative to the Greek national assemblies Member of Parliament

Vasileios Petimezas or Petmezas (Greek: Βασίλειος Πετ[ι]μεζάς, c. 1785–1872) was a Greek revolutionary leader during the Greek War of Independence, politician and general.

== Life ==
Vasileios Petimezas was born in about 1785 as the son of Athanasios Petimezas. He hailed from the important armatolos clan of the Petimezas or Petmezas from the village of Soudena, near Kalavryta.

After his father was murdered in 1804 he fled to British-held Zakynthos, and enrolled in the British-sponsored Greek light infantry units there, along with his brother Nikolaos.

He returned to the Peloponnese at the outbreak of the Greek War of Independence, and fought in several battles at Kalavryta, Levidi, Corinth, Argos, Akrata, and Trikorfa, as well as the campaign against Mustafa Pasha Bushatli. In 1826, with 600 men, he and his brother NIkolaos occupied Mega Spilaio and drove back the attacks of Ibrahim Pasha of Egypt.

He was elected representative to the Greek national assemblies, and later as MP to the Hellenic Parliament.

He reached the rank of lieutenant general.

He died in 1872.

== Sources ==
- Doganis, Th. (1930). Μεγάλη Στρατιωτικὴ καὶ Ναυτικὴ Ἐγκυκλοπαιδεία. Tόμος Πέμπτος: Νάβα–Σαρακηνοί [Great Military and Naval Encyclopaedia. Volume V: Nave–Saracens] (in Greek). Athens: Ἔκδοσις Μεγάλης Στρατιωτικῆς καὶ Ναυτικῆς Ἐγκυκλοπαιδείας. pp. 314–315. OCLC 31255024.
