= Punic-Libyan bilinguals =

Two important ancient inscriptions from Dougga, Tunisia

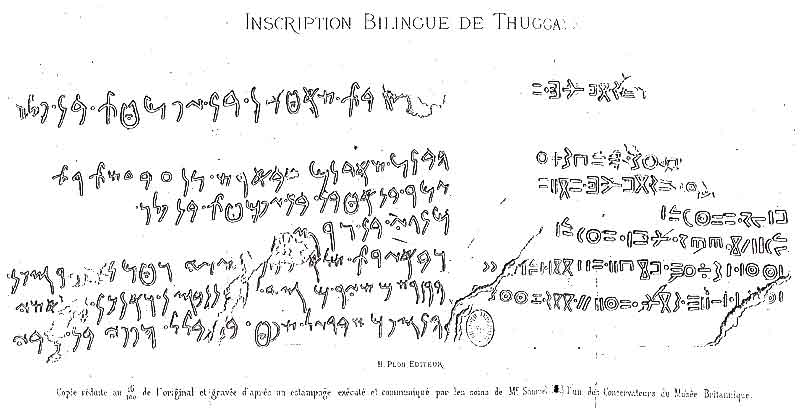
- The first known bilingual inscription of Dougga
- Material: Limestone
- Size: 69 cm high and 207 cm wide
- Writing: Libyco-Berber and Phoenician scripts
- Created: 146 BC
- Present location: British Museum, London
- Identification: 1852,0305.1-2
- Culture: Numidia

The Punic-Libyan bilingual inscriptions are two important ancient bilingual inscriptions dated to the 2nd century BC.

The first, the Cenotaph Inscription, was transcribed in 1631 by Thomas D'Arcos and later played a significant role in deciphering the Libyco-Berber script, in which the Numidian language (Old Libyan) was written. The language is however still not fully understood. The inscription was part of the Libyco-Punic Mausoleum (Mausoleum of Ateban) at Dougga in Tunisia, before it was removed in the mid nineteenth century and taken to London, where it is now in the British Museum's ancient Middle Eastern collection.

The second inscription, the Temple Inscription, is longer than the first, and was discovered in 1904 in the Temple of Jupiter at Dougga. It is currently at the Bardo Museum in Tunis, with casts in the archives of the Louvre and the British Museum.

The Libyan inscriptions are the first two, and the longest two, published in Jean-Baptiste Chabot's 1940 work Recueil des Inscriptions Libyques (known as RIL), as RIL 1 and RIL2. The Punic inscriptions are known as KAI 100 and KAI 101 in the Kanaanäische und Aramäische Inschriften.

== Cenotaph (Ateban) inscription ==
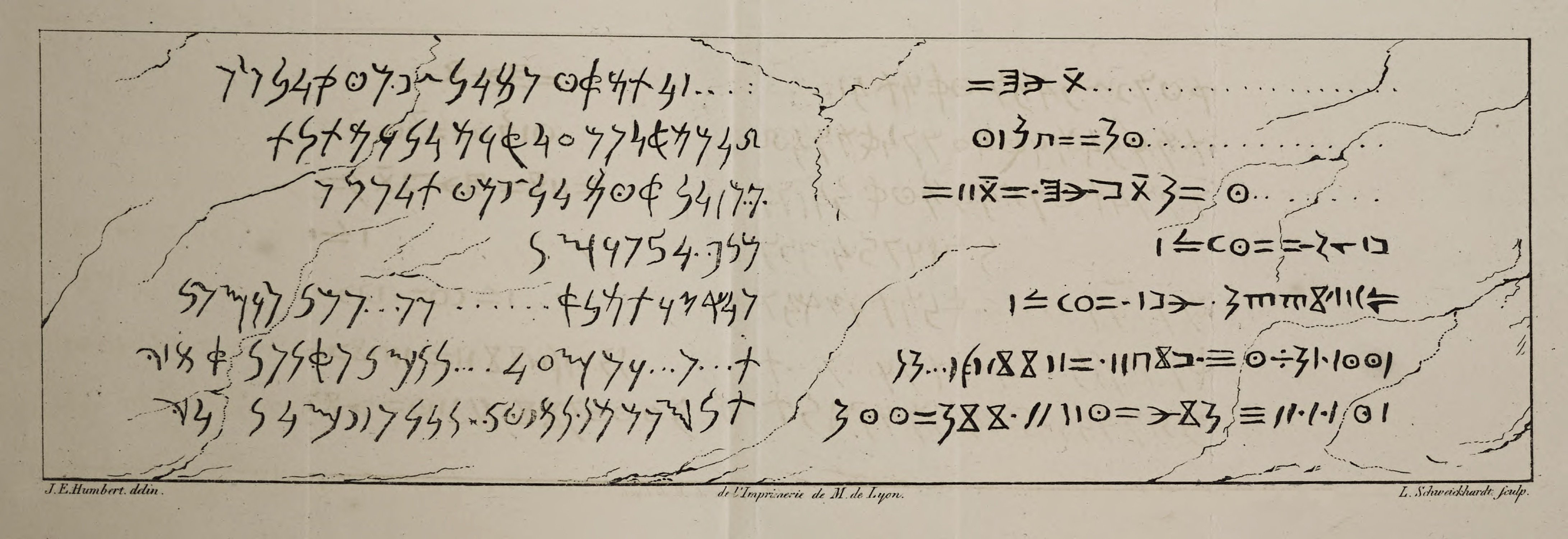
The first published sketch of the inscription (Jean Emile Humbert, 1817)

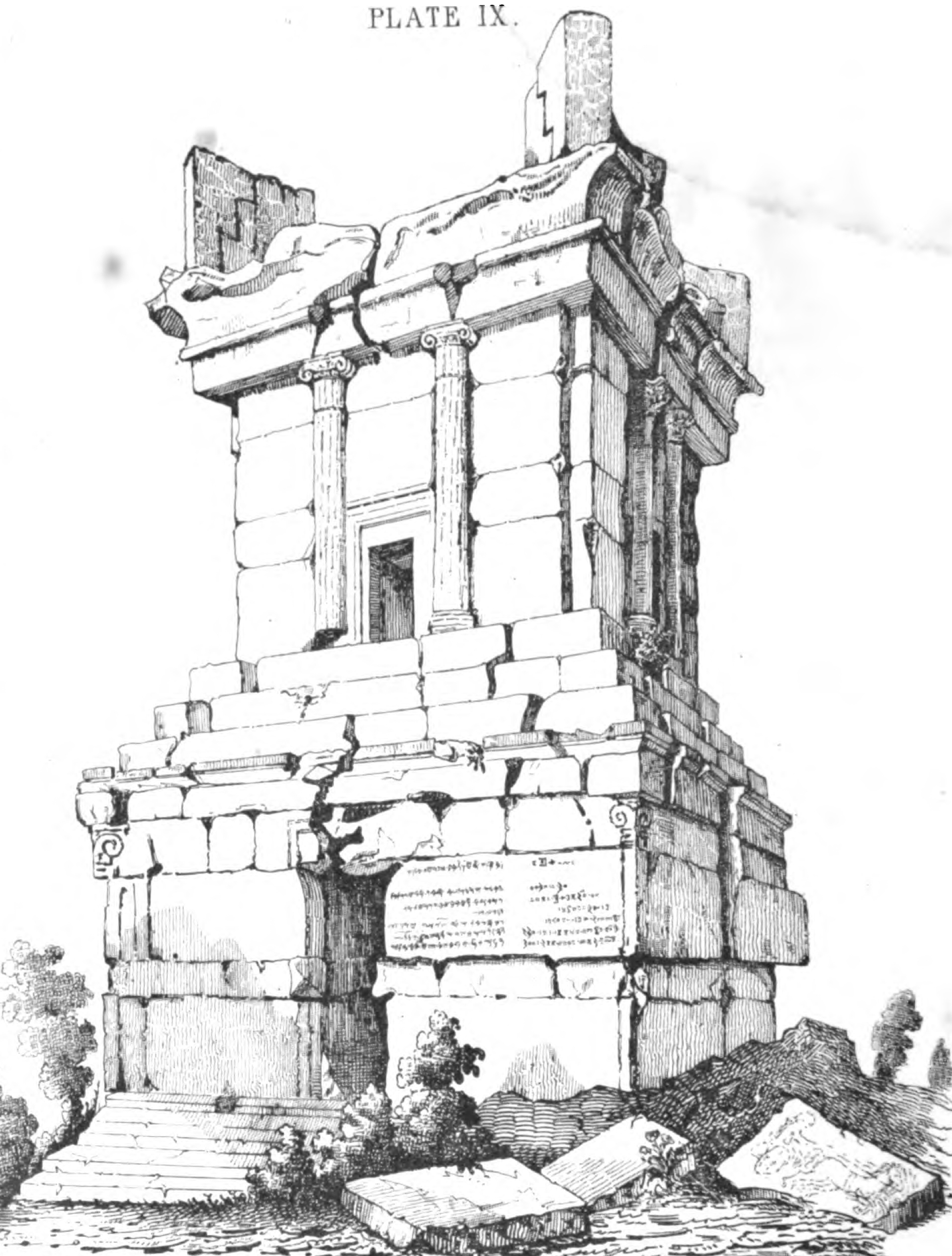
Punico-Libyan Monument at Dugga before the removal of the inscription

=== Discovery ===
It was noted by traveller Thomas d'Arcos in 1631 in his correspondence with Nicolas-Claude Fabri de Peiresc; however this was not published at the time and was unknown to the explorers in the early 19th century. It was rediscovered in 1815 by Count Borgia, and published by Friedrich Münter in 1821, Jean Emile Humbert in 1821, and Hendrik Arent Hamaker in 1828. Munter wrote that: "On the right side it is Punic, or Mauritanian, because I find letters that seem alien to the Punic Alphabet, as far as we know it up to now; on the left are the letters of which a sample is given here. The right side is best preserved."

In 1842, Sir Thomas Reade, the British consul in Tunis, ordered the removal of this inscription from the Mausoleum, which in the process seriously damaged the monument. Recognising the importance of the bilingual inscription in decoding the Libyan language, Reade had it dispatched to London for the 'benefit of science'. Reade demolished the entire wall in which the inscription was embedded, leaving the stone blocks that framed it litter the ground around the mausoleum. Two of Reade's compatriots, Bruce and Catherwood, had taken accurate drawings of the building prior to the removal, although Catherwood described it as Phoenician.

=== Description ===
The Mausoleum of Ateban was built in the second century BC by the inhabitants of Dougga in remembrance of an important prince or dignitary of Numidia. Some have conjectured that it was built for Massinissa, King of Numidia. A limestone frieze with bilingual script was installed on the podium of the mausoleum. The left half of the inscription was engraved in the Punic language, the other half in the Numidian language. The bilingual nature of the inscription made it possible for scholars to decode the ancient Libyco-Berber script, which was written right-to-left.

=== Translation ===
A modern translation of the inscription indicates that the tomb was dedicated to Ateban, the son of Iepmatath, the son of Palu. Other names cited in the inscription, both Punic and Libyan names (and even possibly a Syrian or Jewish name), refer to the monument's architect and the representatives of different professions involved in its construction.

== Temple (Massinissa) inscription ==
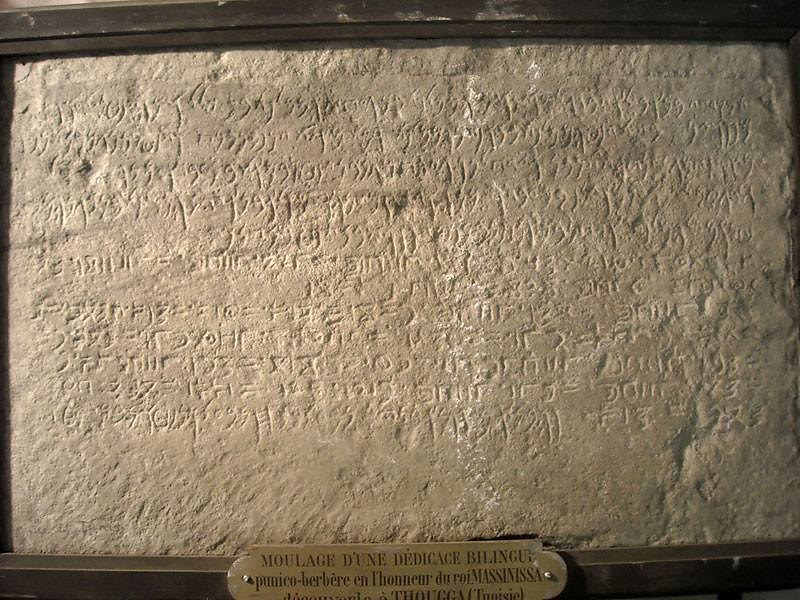
Louvre cast of the Dougga Temple bilingual (AO 4611)

The Temple Inscription was discovered in 1904 during the excavations led by Eugène Sadoux in the Temple of Jupiter at Dougga. It is currently at the Bardo Museum in Tunis, with casts in the archives of the Louvre (ID AO 4611) and the British Museum (ID BM C-2).

It is a dedicatory inscription of the temple, which it states was erected in honor of Massinissa, known for his involvement in the Second Punic War from Livy's History of Rome.

== See also ==
- Rosetta Stone
- Zanata Stone
- Libyco-Punic Mausoleum of Dougga
