= Nikolaos Petimezas =

Greek revolutionary leader (1790–1865)

Lieutenant General Nikolaos Petmezas
- Νικόλαος Πετ[ι]μεζάς
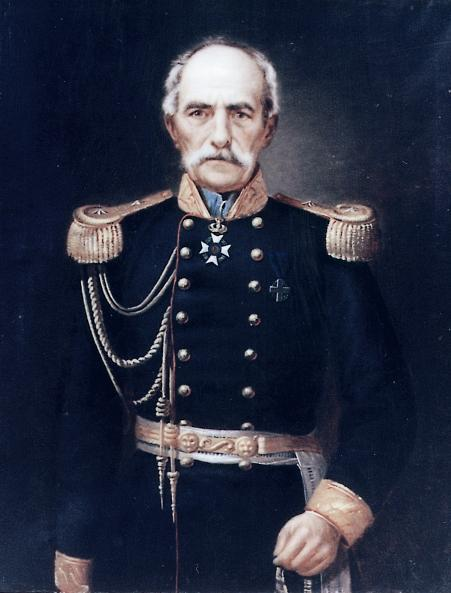
- A portrait of Nikolaos Petmezas
- Born: Soudena, Morea Eyalet, Ottoman Empire (now Greece)
- Relatives: Athanasios Petimezas (father); Vasileios Petimezas (brother)
- Military career
- Allegiance: United Kingdom; First Hellenic Republic; Kingdom of Greece
- Branch: British Army; Hellenic Army
- Rank: Lieutenant General
- Unit: 1st Regiment Greek Light Infantry
- Conflicts: Napoleonic Wars; Adriatic Campaign; Siege of Santa Maura; War of the Sixth Coalition; Siege of Genoa; Greek War of Independence; Battle of Dervenakia; Battle of Phaleron
- Awards: Commander of the Order of the Redeemer

Nikolaos Petimezas or Petmezas (Greek: Νικόλαος Πετ[ι]μεζάς, 1790–1865) was a Greek revolutionary leader during the Greek War of Independence, politician and officer of the Hellenic Gendarmerie.

== Life ==
Nikolaos Petimezas hailed from the important armatolos clan of the Petimezas or Petmezas from the village of Soudena, near Kalavryta. He was born in 1790 as the son of Athanasios Petimezas.

After his father was murdered in 1804 he fled to British-held Zakynthos, and enrolled in the British-sponsored Greek light infantry units there, along with his brother Vasileios.

He returned to the Peloponnese at the outbreak of the Greek War of Independence, and fought in several battles at Kalavryta, Levidi, Corinth, Argos, and Akrata. In 1826, with 600 men, he and his brother occupied Mega Spilaio and drove back the attacks of Ibrahim Pasha of Egypt. He then fought in Attica under Georgios Karaiskakis against Reşid Mehmed Pasha. He reached the rank of lieutenant general.

He died in Kalavryta in 1865.

== Sources ==
- Doganis, Th. (1930). Μεγάλη Στρατιωτικὴ καὶ Ναυτικὴ Ἐγκυκλοπαιδεία. Tόμος Πέμπτος: Νάβα–Σαρακηνοί [Great Military and Naval Encyclopaedia. Volume V: Nave–Saracens] (in Greek). Athens: Ἔκδοσις Μεγάλης Στρατιωτικῆς καὶ Ναυτικῆς Ἐγκυκλοπαιδείας. pp. 314–315. OCLC 31255024.
