= Anagnostis Petimezas =

Greek revolutionary leader

Anagnostis Petimezas Αναγνώστης Πετιμεζάς
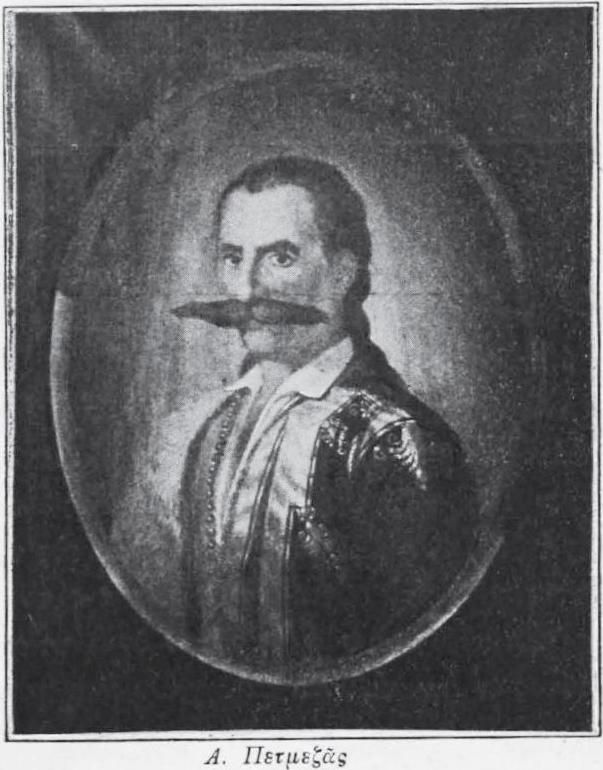
- Born: 1765; Soudena near Kalavryta (now Greece)
- Died: 1822 (aged 56–57); Corinth, Greece
- Occupation: Greek revolutionary leader

Anagnostis Petimezas (Greek: Αναγνώστης Πετιμεζάς, 1765–1822) was a Greek revolutionary leader during the Greek War of Independence.

== Biography ==
He was born in 1765 in Soudena near Kalavryta and was descended from the Petmezades family. He was the son of Sotiris, brother of Athanasios who was killed in Vyoska, Kalavryta in 1769. After his uncle's death, he fled to Zakynthos with his other uncle, Konstantinos Petimezas, where he served in the Greek battalions organized by the Russians in the Ionian Islands.

He participated in the declaration of the Revolution at Agia Lavra and took part in the battles of Kalavryta, Acrocorinth, and Tripoli under the command of Kolokotronis. He also fought in the Battle of Dervenakia.

He was assassinated with his son Sotiris in a Turkish ambush at Vasiliko near Sikyona and Corinth in 1822 as he was on his way to fight against Dramali Pasha.
