= Major Jacob Henniker =

Royal Navy rear-admiral

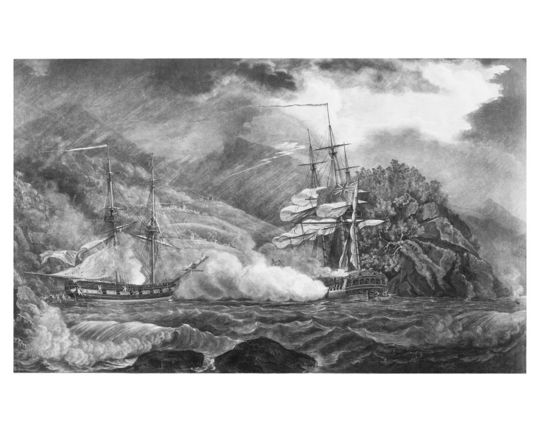
HMS Mermaid at battle

Admiral Major Jacob Henniker (1780–1843) was a 19th-century Royal Navy commander.

== Life ==
He was born on 19 August 1780 and christened "Major Jacob" after his father, Major Henniker (1755–1789). His mother was Mary Phoenix. He appears to be the great nephew of John Henniker, 1st Baron Henniker who was forefather of the Henniker-Major baronets. Due to his aristocratic connections he is referred to as the Honourable Major Jacob Henniker, but some sources confused by both his first name and this designation wrongly claim he was an "honorary major" (as Hon. Major would standardly infer).

He joined the Royal Navy as a lieutenant in July 1799. In April 1802 he was promoted to Commander but not until September 1804 was he given his own ship, the 16-gun HMS Albacore. The ship operated in the English Channel guarding against French invasion (a true fear at that time) and was in the fleet of Admiral Saumarez based in Guernsey. While in command of Albacore he came to public acclaim for the capture of five armed luggers off the coast of France on 4 October 1804.

On 22 January 1806 he was promoted to post captain and given command of the infamous HMS Mermaid in place of Commander Askew Pafford Hollis. His duties involved patrolling the Iberian coast. He was replaced in 1811 by William Henry Percy. Mermaid went on to play a role in the Siege of Trieste.

He died on 5 June 1843 in Hartfield in Sussex. His tomb was sculpted by Thomas Gaffin.

== Family ==
In April 1829 (aged 48) he married his cousin Ann Eliza Henniker. They had at least seven children, including a daughter, Anna Cassandra, and a son, Frederick Henniker (1842-1908).
