= Richard Church (general) =

Military officer (1784–1873)

General Sir Richard Church GCH CB
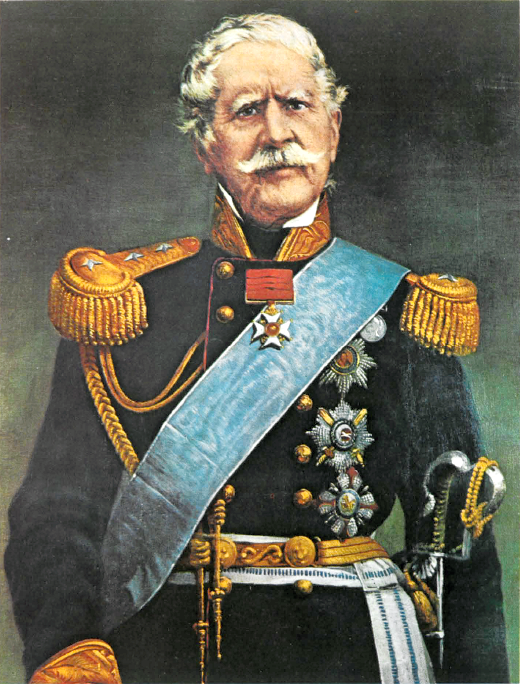
- Church as a general in the Hellenic Army

Member of the Greek Senate
- In office 1844–1845
- Monarch: Otto

Personal details
- Born: 23 February 1784 Cork, Kingdom of Ireland (now Republic of Ireland)
- Died: 20 March 1873 (aged 89) Athens, Kingdom of Greece
- Resting place: First Cemetery of Athens
- Spouse: Marie-Anne Wilmot
- Relations: Richard William Church (nephew)
- Awards: Order of the Bath; Grand Knight Cross of the Royal Guelphic Order; Grand Cross of the Order of the Redeemer

Military service
- Allegiance: United Kingdom; Kingdom of the Two Sicilies; First Hellenic Republic; Kingdom of Greece
- Branch/service: British Army; Hellenic Army
- Years of service: 1800–1829; 1833–1854
- Rank: Lieutenant-Colonel (British Army); Lieutenant General (Sicilian Army); General (Hellenic Army)
- Unit: Somerset Light Infantry; Royal Corsican Rangers; 1st Regiment Greek Light Infantry; 2nd Regiment Greek Light Infantry
- Battles/wars: French Revolutionary Wars: War of the Second Coalition; French campaign in Egypt and Syria; Battle of Abukir; Napoleonic Wars; War of the Third Coalition; Invasion of Naples; Battle of Maida; Adriatic Campaign; Siege of Santa Maura (WIA); Greek War of Independence; Second Siege of the Acropolis

General Sir Richard Church CB GCH (Greek: Ριχάρδος/Ρίτσαρντ Τσούρτς/Τσωρτς; 23 February 1784 – 20 March 1873) (Note: For the date of death see relevant Section of the article explaining the discrepancy of sources) was an Anglo-Irish military officer in the British Army and commander of the Greek forces during the last stages of the Greek War of Independence after 1827. After Greek independence, he became a general in the Hellenic Army and a member of the Greek Senate.

== Early life and career ==
He was the second son of Matthew Church, an Anglo-Irish, Quaker merchant in the North Mall area of Cork, Ireland, and Anne Dearman, an English woman originally from Braithwaite, Yorkshire. At the age of 16, he ran away from home and enlisted in the British Army. For this violation of its principles he was disowned by the Society of Friends, but his father bought him a commission, dated 3 July 1800, in the 13th (Somersetshire) Light Infantry. He served in the demonstration against Ferrol, Spain, and in the expedition to Egypt under Sir Ralph Abercromby in 1801, where he took part in the Battle of Abukir and the taking of Alexandria. After the expulsion of the French from Egypt, he returned home, but he was posted back to the Mediterranean in 1805 among the forces sent to defend the island of Sicily. He accompanied the expedition which landed in Calabria and fought a successful battle against the French at the Battle of Maida on 4 July 1806. Church was present on this occasion as captain of a recently raised company of Royal Corsican Rangers. His zeal attracted the notice of his superiors, and he had begun to show his capacity for managing and drilling foreign levies. His Corsicans formed part of the garrison of Capri from October 1806 till the island was taken by an expedition directed against it by Joachim Murat, in September 1808, at the very beginning of his reign as king of Naples. Church, who had distinguished himself in the defence, returned to Malta after the capitulation.

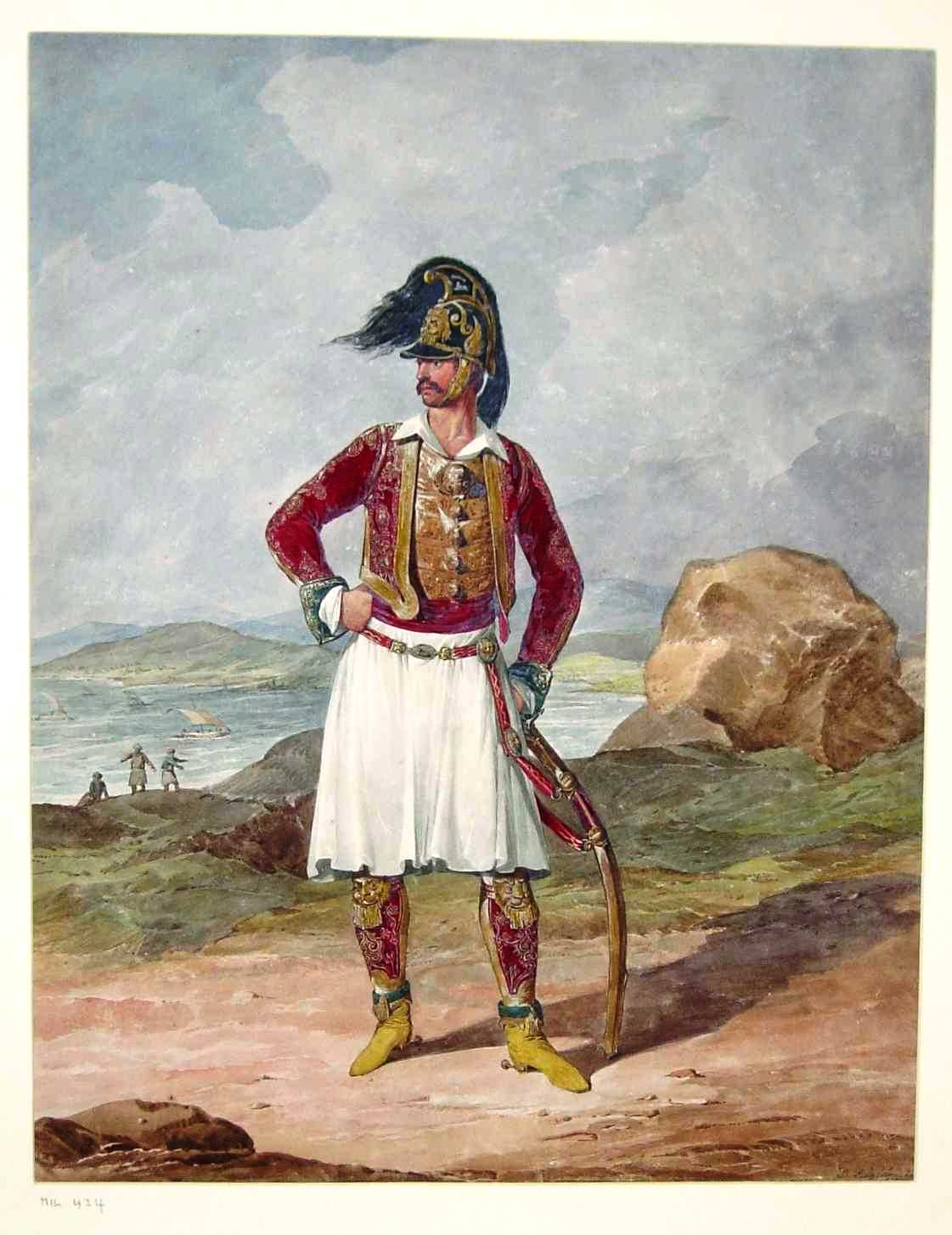
Richard Church as a major in the uniform of the 1st Regiment Greek Light Infantry, 1813

In the summer of 1809 he sailed with the expedition sent to occupy the French-occupied Ionian Islands. Here he increased the reputation he had already gained by forming a Greek regiment in British pay. On 9 September 1809 he took the position of Major in the 1st Regiment Greek Light Infantry. On 19 November 1812 he became Lieutenant-Colonel of the unit, by then renamed The Duke of York's Greek Light Infantry Regiment (1811 – 24 February 1816). Having got the experience of managing foreign troops, he commanded the regiments made up from Greeks he recruited himself in 1813, when he formed a second regiment composed of 454 Greeks (2nd Regiment Greek Light Infantry) to occupy Paxoi islands. These regiments included many of the men who were afterwards among the leaders of the Greeks in the War of Independence including Theodoros Kolokotronis, with whom he kept a friendship and correspondence. Church commanded this regiment at the taking of the island of Santa Maura (Lefkada), on which occasion his left arm was shattered by a bullet.

During his slow recovery he travelled in northern Greece, in Macedonia, and to Constantinople. In the years of the fall of Napoleon (1813 and 1814) he was present as British military representative with the Austrian troops until the campaign which terminated in the expulsion of Murat from Naples. He drew up a report on the Ionian Islands for the congress of Vienna, in which he argued in support, not only of the retention of the islands under the British flag, but of the permanent occupation by Britain of Parga and of other formerly Venetian coastal towns on the mainland, then in the possession of Ali Pasha of Yanina. The peace and the disbanding of his Greek regiment left him without employment, though his reputation was high at the war office, and his services were recognized by being appointed as a Companion of the Order of the Bath.

In 1817, he entered the service of King Ferdinand of Naples as lieutenant-general, with a commission to suppress the brigandage then rampant in Apulia. Ample powers were given him, and he attained a full measure of success. In 1820 he was appointed governor of Palermo and commander-in-chief of the troops in Sicily. The revolution which broke out in that year led to the termination of his services in Naples. He escaped from violence in Sicily with some difficulty. At Naples he was imprisoned and put on his trial by the government, but was acquitted and released in January 1821; and in 1822 King George IV made him a Knight Commander of the Royal Guelphic Order. He was further promoted to Knight Grand Cross by William IV in 1837.

== Role in the Greek War of Independence ==
The rising of the Greeks against the Turks, which began at this time, had his full sympathy from the first. But for some years he had to act only as the friend of the insurgents in England. In 1827 he took the honourable but unfortunate step of accepting the commandership-in-chief of the Greek army. At the point of anarchy and indiscipline to which they had now fallen, the Greeks could no longer form an efficient army, and could look for salvation only to foreign intervention. Sir Richard Church, who landed in March, was sworn archistrategos on 15 April 1827. But he could not secure loyal co-operation or obedience. The rout of his army in an attempt to relieve the acropolis of Athens, then besieged by the Ottomans, proved that it was incapable of conducting regular operations. The acropolis capitulated, and Sir Richard turned to partisan warfare in western Greece.

After the Battle of Navarino, and during the Kapodistrias period, he was placed commander-in-chief of the Greek regular forces in Central Greece, together with Demetrios Ypsilantis.

Church, however, surrendered his commission, as a protest against the unfriendly government of Capodistrias, on 25 August 1829. He lived for the rest of his life in Greece.

== Role in independent Greece ==
His activity had beneficial results and led to a rectification in 1832, in a sense favourable to Greece, of the frontier drawn by the Great Powers in the London Protocol (1830) (see his Observations on an Eligible Line of Frontier for Greece, London, 1830).

Under King Otto, he occupied senior military positions. On 3 October 1833, he was promoted to lieutenant general in the Hellenic Army, and in January 1835 became commander of the forces in Continental Greece. On 10 June 1835 he was appointed head of the Secretariat of State for Military Affairs (Army Minister), becoming Inspector-General of the Army on 28 October 1836. In 1844–45 he was a senator. He was promoted to full general—the grade being established for the first time for this purpose in the Hellenic Army—in February 1854, and died at Athens in 1873.

== Family ==
Sir Richard Church married Marie-Anne, daughter of Sir Robert Wilmot, 2nd Baronet of Osmaston in Worthing, on 17 Aug 1826 (Note: There are also references such as the 1911 Encyclopædia Britannica which mention that his wife was "Elizabeth Augusta Wilmot-Horton, who survived him till 1878". However there are secondary as well as primary sources which confirm that he married Marie-Anne, daughter of Sir Robert Wilmot, 2nd Baronet of Osmaston.)

He was the uncle of English churchman and writer Richard William Church.

== Death ==
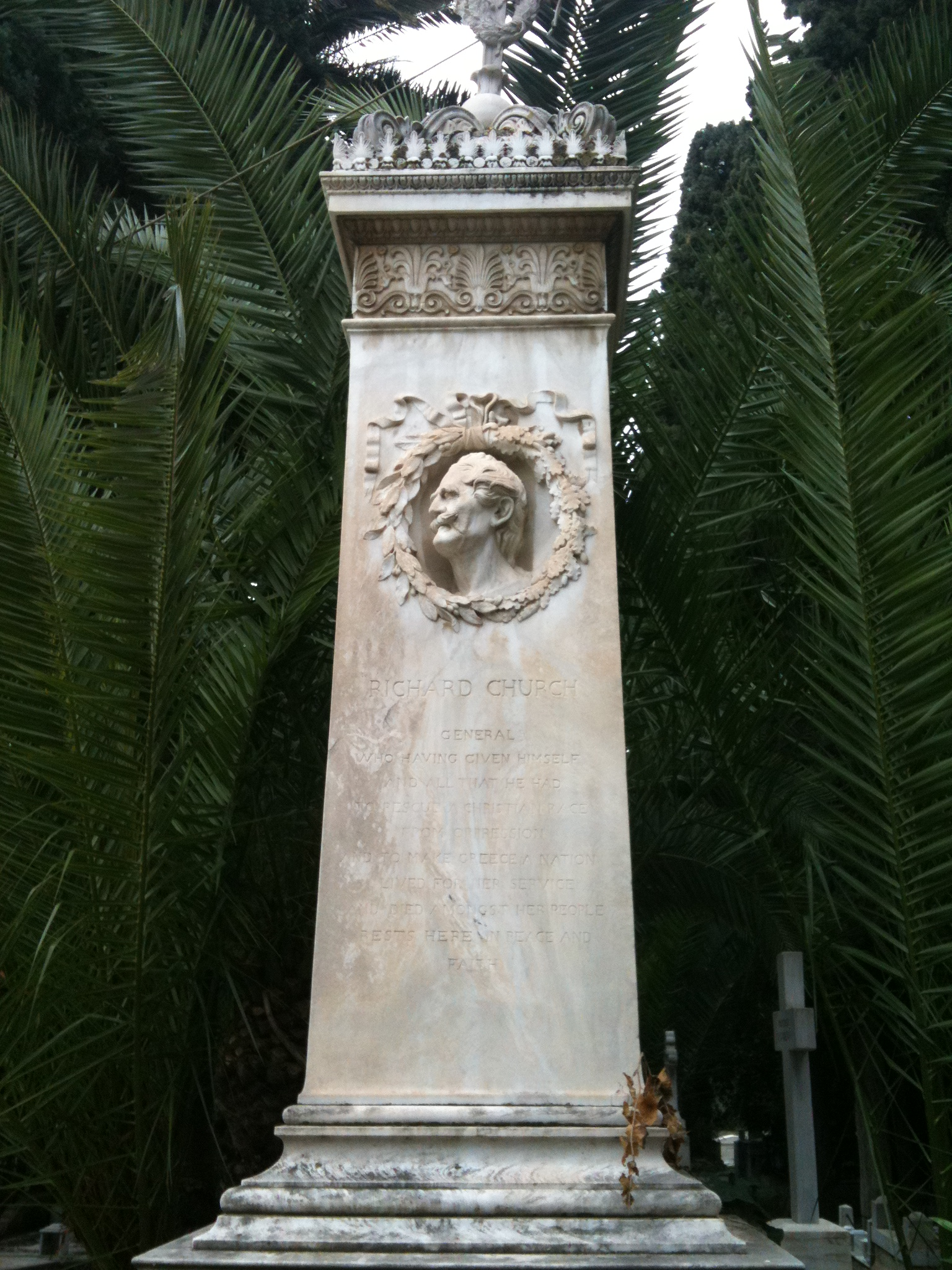
Grave of Sir Richard Church, Athens.

He died after an illness on Thursday, 20 March [O.S. 8 March] 1873 and he was buried at the First Cemetery of Athens at public expense on 27 March [O.S. 15 March]. (Note: Primary and secondary sources indicate that his date of death was 8 March [N.S. 20 March] 1873, while the Encyclopædia Britannica and the Oxford Dictionary of National Biography give 30 March as the date of death.) The funeral took place after a delay in waiting for his nephew, who was expected to come from England.

The funeral service took place in the Anglican Church in Filellinon Street in the presence of King George I and a large numbers of official guests. The funeral monument is at the First Cemetery of Athens, opposite the Church of St. Lazarus, and it has an inscription in English on the front ("Richard Church, General, who having given himself and all he had, to rescue a Christian race from oppression, and to make Greece a nation, lived for her service, and died among her people, rests here in peace and faith") and Greek on the back. On 15 March, the Minister of Justice, Panagiotis Chalkiopoulos, gave the funeral speech in Greek, while John Gennadius gave a speech in English.
