= Thomas Gaffin =

Irish sculptor (1819–1869)

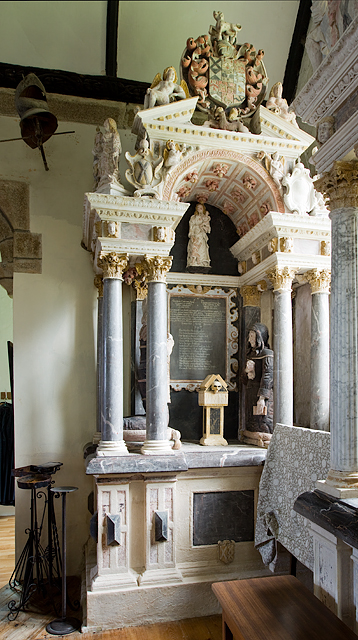
Monument to Sir William Coryton in St Mellion

Thomas Gaffin (1819–1869) was a 19th-century sculptor of Irish descent.

== Life ==
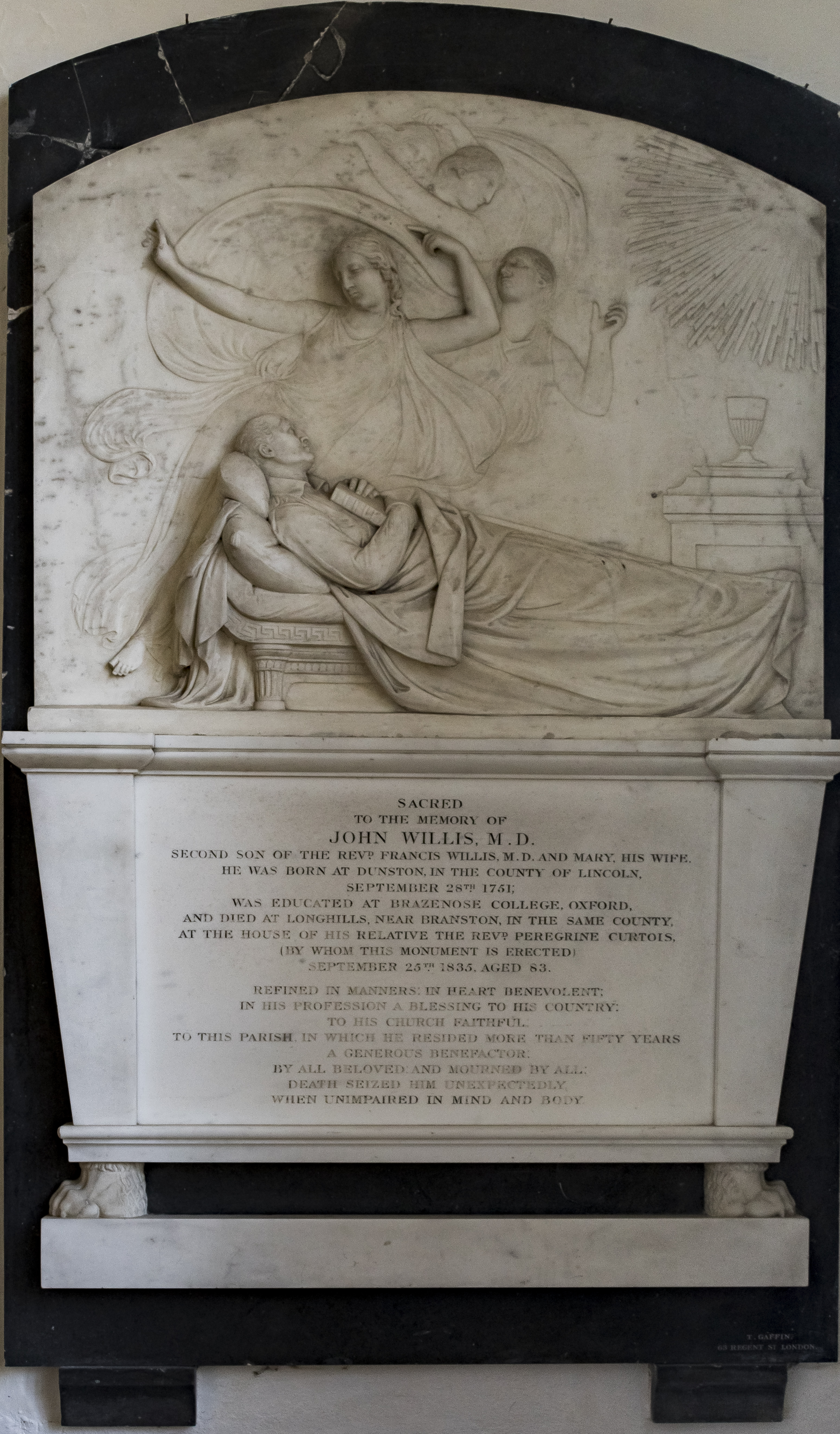
Monument to John Willis in St Thomas à Becket church, Greatford

He was born in Swinford, County Mayo in Ireland, the son of Edward Gaffin (1780–1855), a sculptor and stonemason. The family left Ireland and moved to London around 1800. He specialised in ornate graves for the rich and famous; most of his work is in the south of England.

From 1841 to 1860 he lived at 17 Kensington Place and from then until his death lived at 6 Bessborough Place. He had offices at 63 Regent Street. He died on 24 October 1869 and is buried in Kensal Green Cemetery. His will left £16000.

The Gaffin family operated a successful monumental masonry business in London, which continued under the name Gaffin & Co. into the early 20th century. The firm produced large numbers of funerary monuments and memorial tablets, many made from black and white marble. Among the works associated with Thomas Gaffin is a memorial to Charlotte Angerstein, dated 1863, in the Church of Ireland church at Castleblayney, County Monaghan. The family business was continued by his son Edward Gaffin, who died in 1871.

== Works ==
- Monument to Sir Richard Neave at South Weald (1814)
- Monument to the Duke of Richmond in Chichester Cathedral (1819)
- Monument to Sophia St John at Coltishall (1827)
- Monument to Jemima Harvey at Langley Marish (1827)
- Monument to William Torriano at Stanstead Mountfitchet (1828)
- Monument to Pownoll Pellew, 2nd Viscount Exmouth at Christow (1833)
- Monument to Sarah Winfield at Tyringham (1834)
- Monument to John Monck in St Mary's Church in Reading (1834)
- Monument to John Willis in Greatford (1834)
- Monument to William Coryton in St Mellion (1836)
- Monument to James Digby in Bourne, Lincolnshire (1836)
- Monument to the Hon. Emily Wingfield at Adlestrop (1837)
- Monument to Lady Sarah Wandesford at Ulcombe (1838)
- Monument to Caroline Dashwood in Stanford-on-Soar (1840)
- Monument to Rear Admiral Major Jacob Henniker in Hartfield (1843)
- Monument to Herbert Barrett Curteis MP in Wartling (1847)
- Monument to Lord Clyde in Westminster Abbey (1863)
- Monument to Sophia Charlotte Hennis in Exeter Cathedral
- Monument to Edmund Beynham at Carshalton Parish Church
- Monument to Sir Thomas Reade at Congleton (1849)
- Monument to Sir Joseph Bazalgette Sr. in Wimbledon Parish Church (1849)
- Memorial to Lt. George Ross Caldwell at Kew Church
