= Siege of Genoa (1814) =

1814 conflict in the Napoleonic Wars

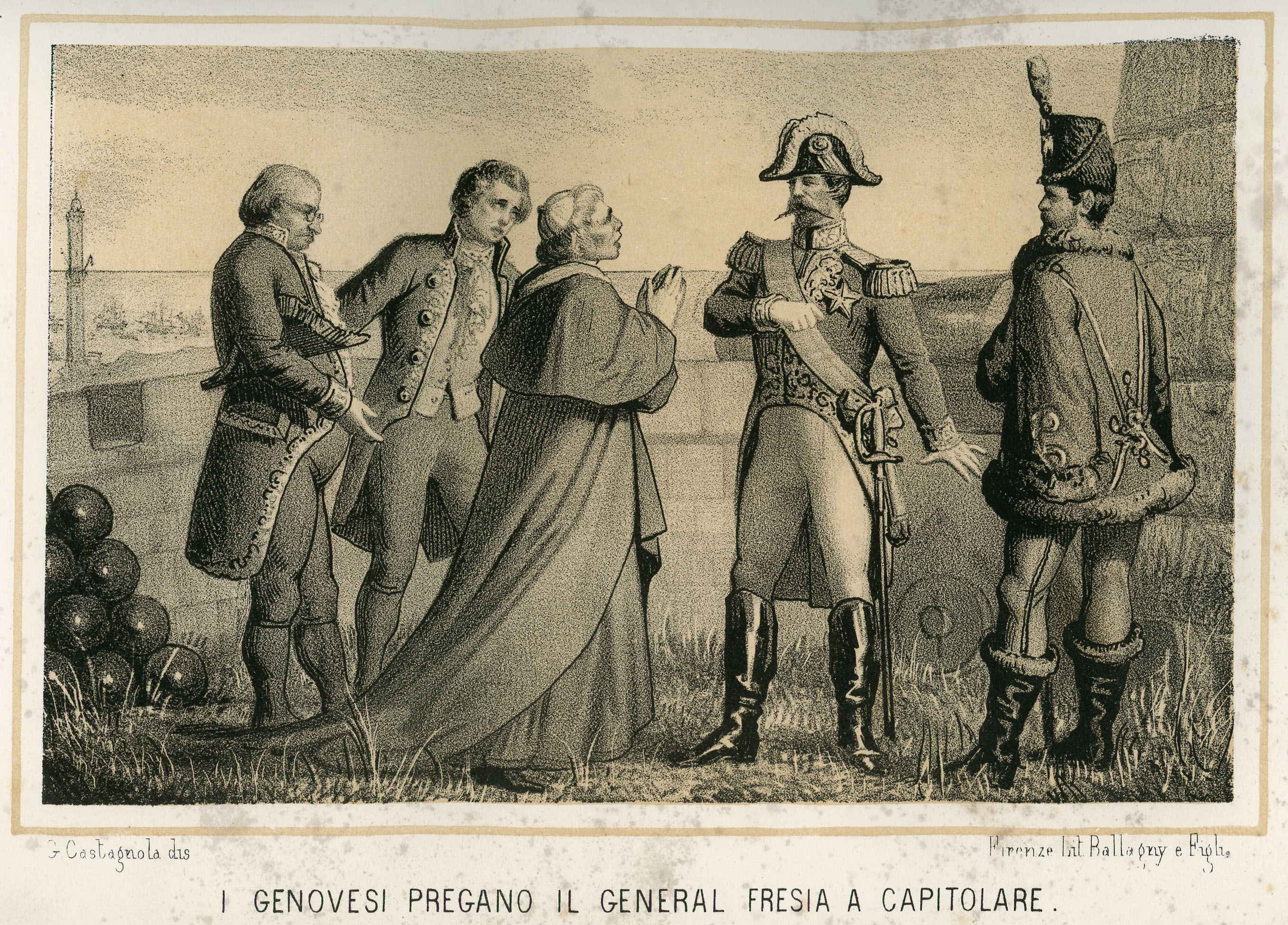
- The Genoese entreat General Fresia to capitulate by Gabriele Castagnola, 1864
Date	13–18 April 1814
Location	Genoa, Gênes, French Empire
Result	Coalition victory

Belligerents
United Kingdom; Kingdom of Sicily; Genoese civilians Kingdom of Sardinia	French Empire

Commanders and leaders
William Bentinck	Maurizio Ignazio Fresia; Jean Pégot (WIA); Jean-Pierre Piat

Strength
16,000–18,000 soldiers 7 frigates 12–15 brigantines	A few thousand soldiers

The siege of Genoa on 13–18 April 1814 was the capture of the port city of Genoa from the First French Empire by a British–Sicilian army, during the War of the Sixth Coalition. The Anglo-Sicilian forces, commanded by Lieutenant General Lord William Bentinck, laid siege to the Ligurian capital, while the Austrians invaded Lombardy in the Italian campaign of 1813–1814. The Republic of Genoa was restored but soon abolished, at the behest of the Congress of Vienna, and ceded to the Kingdom of Sardinia.

== Historical context ==
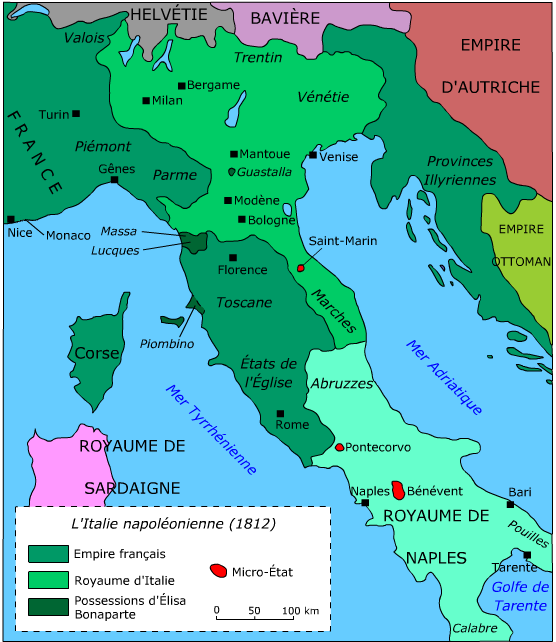
Italy in 1812, in its political-territorial order at the time of the invasion of the anti-French coalition in 1813-1814

Setting sail from Sicily on 30 January 1814, William Bentinck initially made his way to Naples. There he reluctantly signed an armistice with Joachim Murat, whom he personally detested as a man whose "whole life had been a crime", yet whom Britain found it expedient to detach from his brother-in-law, Napoleon, by guaranteeing his Kingdom of Naples in return for an alliance. Having instructed the forces under his command in Sicily to make a landing at Livorno, Bentinck then travelled north, with a day's stop in Rome, to join them. The disembarkation at Livorno began on the 9 March and took three days to complete, Murat's Neapolitans already having occupied the port beforehand.

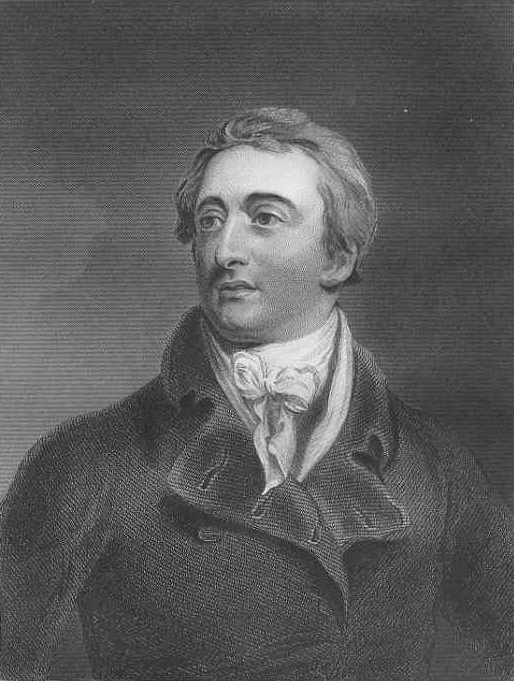
William Bentinck

Napoleon's sister Elisa, though having now abandoned her Grand Duchy of Tuscany, had nevertheless not given up completely in attempting to salvage something out of the collapse of her brother's Empire. Having obtained from Murat - husband of her sister Caroline - the guarantee that he would obtain the consent of the Coalition he had just joined to her retention of the Principality of Lucca and Piombino in return for having rendered up Tuscany without a fight, she had, by the time of Bentinck's appearance at Livorno, retired to Lucca. Upon hearing of his landing, she sent a delegation to gain assurances that Murat's pact would be respected. Bentinck replied that it would not. If she did not depart immediately, he said, she would be arrested. With 2,000 British troops dispatched towards the city to carry out this threat, the heavily pregnant Elisa had no choice but to abandon the last of her territories and flee north, where she eventually fell into allied hands at Bologna.

Elisa left Lucca on March 13. The next day, Bentinck issued a proclamation from Livorno calling on the Italian nation to rise up in a liberation movement. He declared:

"Italians!
Great Britain has landed her troops on your shores; she holds out her hand to you to free you from the iron yoke of Buonaparte...hesitate no longer...assert your rights and your liberty. Call us, and we will hasten to you, and then, our forces joined, will effect that Italy may become what in the best times she was.

In thus attempting to bring about his long-nurtured dream of an independent Italian nation-state in the north and centre (he did not consider Neapolitans and Sicilians to be "Italian"), Bentinck was quite publicly repudiating the policy of his own Government - which was intending to largely restore the status quo ante bellum in Italy; with Austria in possession of Lombardy and the King of Sardinia re-established in Piedmont. For the next month, Bentinck was therefore operating as effectively an independent actor representative of Britain only, as Rosselli says, in the widest sense: in that he held himself to be furthering Britain's true interests, regardless of whether the current Government recognised them or not.

Ordering his troops north to besiege Genoa, Bentinck himself now headed to Reggio Emilia for a conference with Murat. At this conference on the 15th, he brazenly demanded that Tuscany be handed over to himself and evacuated by the Neapolitan forces then in possession of it. It was necessary, he argued, that Tuscany be under British jurisdiction, as otherwise he would have no logistical base from which to conduct future operations - to which Murat replied that it was the same argument on his side which dictated his own necessary possession of it. Suddenly threatening to turn his forces against Naples itself and restore the former Bourbon king Ferdinand IV if Murat did not give way, Bentinck was quickly reprimanded in a firm note from Castlereagh reminding him that he was instructed to co-operate in every way with Murat and Austria. At which he reluctantly withdrew his bid for Tuscany - which he had likely been hoping to turn into the nucleus of a free Italian state under his own aegis - and left for Genoa. There had, in any case, been no discernible response from the Tuscans to Bentinck's proclamation, while in Genoa he would find a welcoming audience at last.

Bentinck had been ordered to take and occupy Genoa in the name of the king of Sardinia, Victor Emmanuel I.

== Course of the battle ==
=== The Coalition approaches Genoa ===
Maurizio Ignazio Fresia

On 9 April, General Jean Pégot, sent to Genoa by the Viceroy of Italy Eugène de Beauharnais, was commissioned by General Maurizio Ignazio Fresia, commander of the garrison of the Ligurian capital since February, to replace General Jean Victor Rouyer. On the same day, Recco was again heavily bombarded by the Coalition; the next day the fire was renewed and the French ships were forced to evacuate.

On the evening of the 9th, General Pégot, having learned that an Austrian detachment of the corps of Laval Nugent von Westmeath had joined the insurgents at Val Fontanabuona, and seeing that the British continued to fire on Recco and Sori, decided to leave his position, overnight. The retreat took place in good order, and on the morning of the 10th Pégot occupied the position of Monte Fasce.

The Coalition had nine ships of the line and three or four frigates in front of Genoa, as well as a large number of transports. The French saw them move towards Savona, which made them fear for a moment a landing on the beach, which stretched from Sampierdarena to Arenzano; this beach was manned only by three detachments of the 102nd Infantry Regiment, stationed in Arenzano, Voltri and Sestri Ponente.

On the 12th the Coalition attacked Pégot in the position of Monte Fasce. They fought all day, but the general, finding it impossible to resist, withdrew during the night; he went to occupy the position of Sturla, on the heights of Albaro, with the right to the sea, covered by a battery of 4 artillery pieces, and the left to Fort Richelieu.

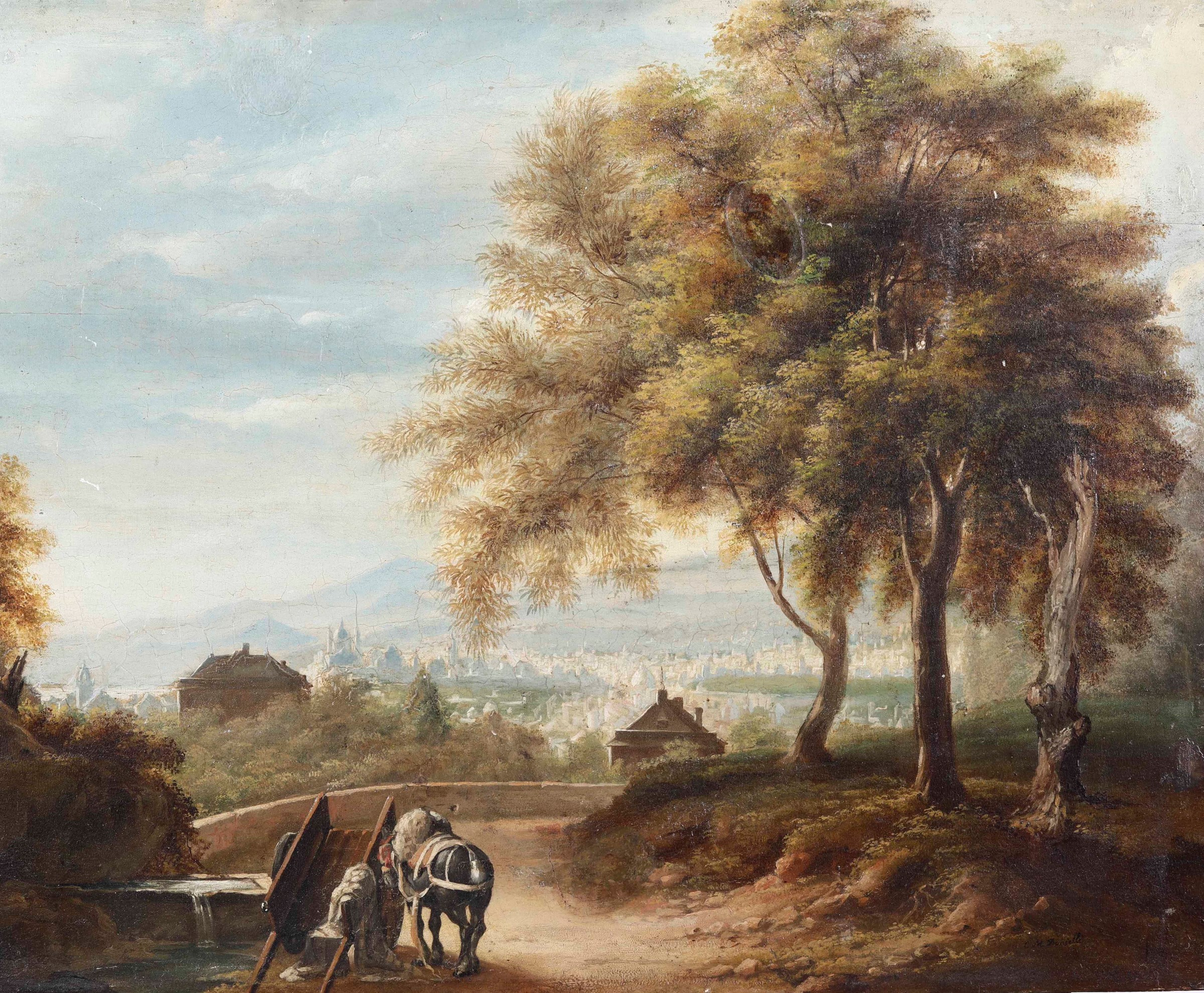
View of Genoa from the Albaro hill in a painting by Michele Cesare Danielli.

=== Siege ===
Coalition forces arrived near the walls of Genoa on 13 April. Bentinck was the commander of the British troops and commander in chief while the Sicilians were under General Vito Nunziante. The confrontation focused mainly on Sturla and Albaro, where the British were preparing a general attack.

That day the allies landed at Nervi with infantry, artillery and cavalry, and attacked the position of Sturla. At the beginning of the action, the gunners of the Sturla battery bombarded them but then abandoned the position. Pégot brought them back and ordered to open fire again. The general was wounded in the clash. General Jean-Pierre Piat, who was nearby, replaced him. The fighting lasted all day on the heights of Albaro, and in the evening the Coalition howitzers succeeded in destroying the battery of Sturla.During the night the French position was corrected, linking it to the battery of the Torre dell'Amore. The gunners of this battery, abandoned their posts, were replaced by line gunners.

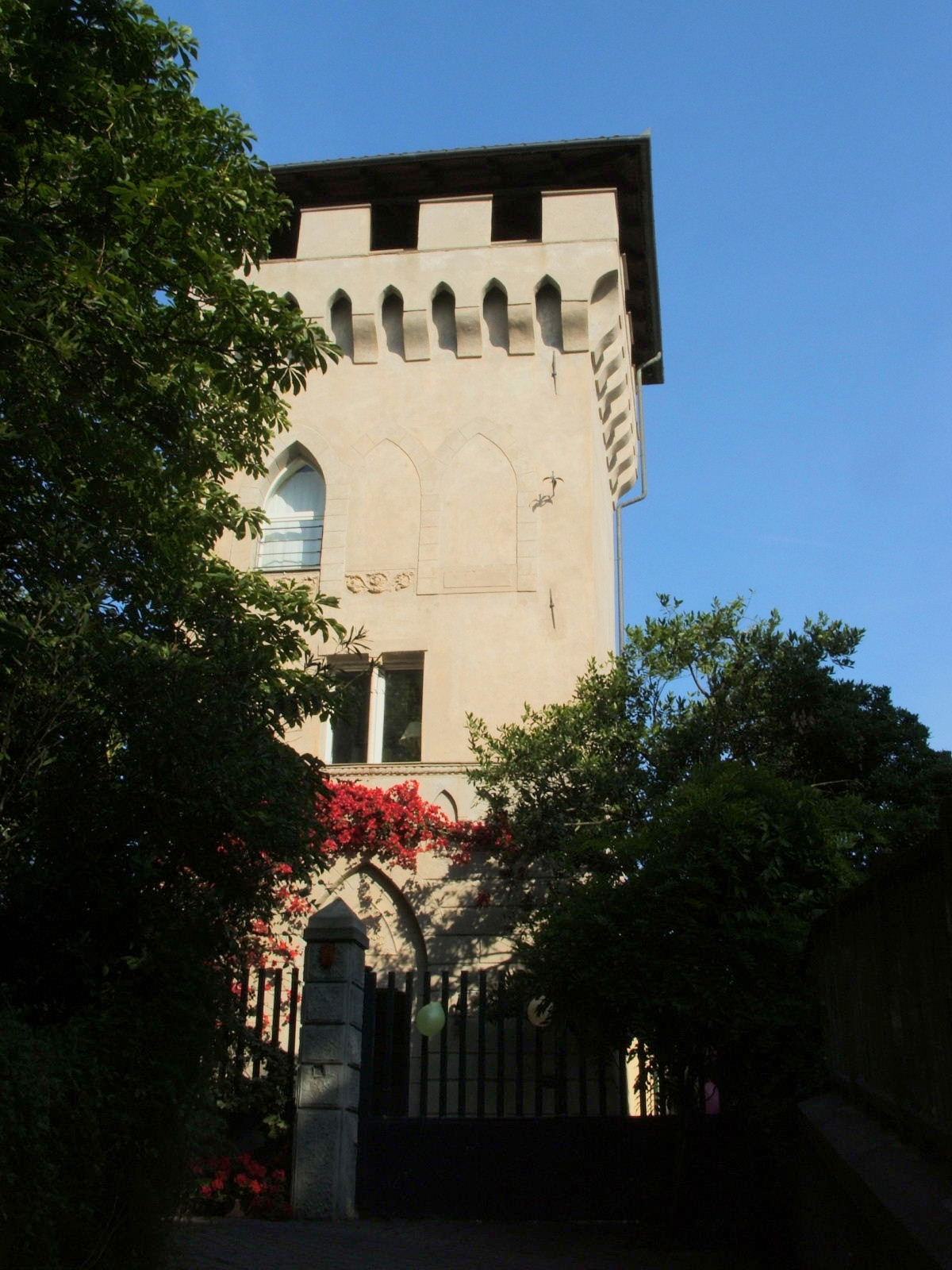
The Torre dell'Amore

On the 14th the British renewed their attack on Albaro's position. Bentinck was there in person. The British general had announced to the Genoese, through an emissary, that he would be inside the city the next day; he counted on the superiority of his strength. This information sparked some demonstrations in the city, and General Fresia considered it his duty to invite the municipality to deploy the National Guard, although there was already some disorder in this body. But there was no other way to keep the peace.

On the 17th, at two in the morning, the British carried out a feint attack between Sestri Ponente and Sampierdarena, with fire support from the artillery. At five in the morning they opened fire on the French battery positioned to the left of Sturla. The Coalition approached the French ships from the coast and attacked with all their forces, amounting to more than 15,000 men, the positions of San Martino and San Francesco. The French troops were forced to evacuate their positions, as well as the plateau between the Richelieu, Santa Tecla and Sperone forts.

The batteries of the Torre dell'Amore, taken from behind, were removed, and the Coalition bombarded the city. This induced the Genoese to rebel against the French. The mayor and archbishop Giuseppe Spina went to Fresia to urge him to capitulate. The general allowed the municipality to send a delegation to Bentinck to urge him to suspend the bombardment. Bentinck refused any proposal and demanded that the city be handed over, after the capitulation of the forts Santa Tecla and Richelieu. The French troops then withdrew, in good order, behind the Bisagno (river) river, and the British did not pass San Martino d'Albaro.

The civil unrest in the city increased during the day and night of the 17th, without the National Guard bothering to calm it down. The garrison of Genoa capitulated the next day. Also on the 18th, around noon, Bentinck sent Lieutenant General Robert Henry MacFarlane to hasten the surrender, threatening, if refused, to restart the attacks and bombings. The day was spent in negotiations and the next night the evacuation convention was signed. Thus, on April 20, the British entered the city. Fresia was able to leave Genoa with military honours.

== Aftermath ==
When the city surrendered to him on 18 April 1814, he instead proclaimed - contrary to the intentions of the Coalition - the restoration of the Republic of Genoa and the repeal of all laws passed since 1797, much to the enthusiasm of the Genoese population. At the same time, he dispatched an expeditionary force to Corsica to attempt to revive the Anglo-Corsican Kingdom of 1794–1796 and gain for Britain another useful base in the Mediterranean. In Genoa meanwhile, on the 24th, he received representations from the provisional government in Milan beseeching Britain's support for the maintenance of an independent Kingdom of Italy rather than the restoration of Austrian rule over Lombardy. With Napoleon's abdication of both the French and Italian thrones on 11 April, the government in Milan was in search of a new sovereign who would better bolster their chances of survival and, in seeking to bind Britain to their cause, the suggestion was put to Bentinck that Prince Adolphus, Duke of Cambridge, the seventh son of George III, would be a welcome candidate. Though Bentinck recommended they might look to Archduke Francis of Este as a more realistic candidate in order to mollify the Austrians. In this regard, the Piedmontese general Vittorio Amedeo Sallier della Torre, commander of the Italian Levy of the British army, created a draft of the Constitution in which, looking forward to the union of Piedmont, Liguria and Lombardy, he hoped for a charter that would guarantee a liberal government, although he was a staunch reactionary.

With Napoleon's double abdication on the 11 April however - though the news took time to cross the Alps - Bentinck's capacity to influence events on the ground while, with the war against the Emperor still raging, all was still to a great extent up in the air, largely came to an end. As did his Government's motive for toleration. His erratic behaviour over the recent months had led the Prime Minister Lord Liverpool to brand him simply "mad", and his scope of authority was sharply reduced; though he was not finally dismissed from his grand post as Commander-in-Chief in the Mediterranean until April the following year.

== Order of battle ==
=== Coalition ===
Bentinck's force was embarked as follows for the campaign in February 1814:
Lieutenant-General Lord William Bentinck (Commander of the force)

Lieutenant-Colonel John Lemoine (Commander, Royal Artillery)
Lieutenant-Colonel Thomas Kenah (Deputy Adjutant General)
Major Thomas Reade (Deputy Quartermaster General)
Captain William Tylden (Commander, Royal Engineers)

Division	Regiment	Men
1st Division; Major-General Henry Montresor	1st Battalion, 21st Regiment of Foot	1,204
1st Division; Major-General Henry Montresor	1st Battalion, 62nd Regiment of Foot	1,027
1st Division; Major-General Henry Montresor	3rd Line Battalion, King's German Legion	1,001
1st Division; Major-General Henry Montresor	6th Line Battalion, King's German Legion	971
1st Division; Major-General Henry Montresor	8th Line Battalion, King's German Legion (split)	105
1st Division; Major-General Henry Montresor	1st Greek Light Infantry	250
1st Division; Major-General Henry Montresor	1st Italian Infantry Regiment - it:Italian Levy	1,220
1st Division; Major-General Henry Montresor	3rd Italian Infantry Regiment - Italian Levy	1,220
1st Division; Major-General Henry Montresor	Calabrian Free Corps	618
1st Division; Major-General Henry Montresor	2nd Sicilian Cavalry Regiment (split)	125
1st Division; Major-General Henry Montresor	2nd Sicilian Infantry Regiment	1,186
2nd Division; Lieutenant-General Robert MacFarlane
2nd Division; Lieutenant-General Robert MacFarlane	2nd Battalion, 14th Regiment of Foot	1,140
2nd Division; Lieutenant-General Robert MacFarlane	1st Battalion, 31st Regiment of Foot	713
2nd Division; Lieutenant-General Robert MacFarlane	8th Line Battalion, King's German Legion (split)	881
2nd Division; Lieutenant-General Robert MacFarlane	2nd Sicilian Cavalry Regiment (split)	287
2nd Division; Lieutenant-General Robert MacFarlane	Sicilian Grenadiers	827
2nd Division; Lieutenant-General Robert MacFarlane	3rd Sicilian Infantry Regiment	1,222
2nd Division; Lieutenant-General Robert MacFarlane	4th Sicilian Infantry Regiment	1,222

== Bibliography ==
- Boulger, Demetrius Charles (1897). Rulers of India: Lord William Bentinck. Oxford Clarendon Press. ISBN 978-1-164-16873-7.
- Burnham, Robert; McGuigan, Ron (2010). The British Army against Napoleon. Barnsley, South Yorkshire: Frontline Books. ISBN 978-1-84832-562-3.
- Chartrand, René (2000). Émigré and Foreign Troops in British Service (2): 1803–1815. Men-at-Arms 335. Illustrated by Patrice Courcelle. Oxford: Osprey Publishing. ISBN 978-1-85-532859-4.
- Fortescue, John (1920). A History of the British Army. Vol. 10. London: MacMillan and Co.
- Gregory, Desmond (1988). Sicily: The Insecure Base: A History of the British Occupation of Sicily, 1806-1815. London: Fairleigh Dickinson University Press. ISBN 978-0-83-863306-9.
- Gregory, Desmond (2001). Napoleon's Italy. London: Fairleigh Dickinson University Press. ISBN 978-0-83-863884-2.
- Ilari, Virgilio; Crociari, Piero (2015) [2010]. L'Armata a di Lord Bentinck 1812-1816 (in Italian). Soldiershop. ISBN 978-8-89-915819-4 – via www.mondadoristore.it.
- Nafziger, George F.; Gioannini, Marco (2002). The defense of the Napoleonic kingdom of Northern Italy, 1813-1814. Westport, Conn.: Praeger. ISBN 978-0-313-07531-5.
- Rath, Reuben John (1941). The Fall of the Napoleonic Kingdom of Italy, 1814. New York: Columbia University Press. OCLC 981109145.
- Rosselli, John (1974). Lord William Bentinck: The Making of a Liberal Imperialist, 1774-1839. Berkeley: University of California Press. ISBN 978-0-52-002299-7.
- Schneid, Frederick C. (2002). Napoleon's Italian Campaigns: 1805–1815. Westport, Conn.: Praeger. ISBN 978-0-27-596875-5.
- Vignolle, Martin (1817). Précis historique des opérations militaires de l'Armée d'Italie en 1813 et 1814, par le Chef de l'État-Major-Général de cette armée (M. de V.) (in French). Paris: Chez Barrois l'aîné, Libraire – via Gallica.

== Related items ==
- Fall of the Kingdom of Italy
- 1st Regiment Greek Light Infantry
- Siege of Genoa (1800)
- it:Cattura di La Spezia
- it:John Rosselli
- it:Italian Levy
- it:Calabrian Free Corps
