= Konstantinos Petimezas =

Greek Revolutionary Leader

Konstantinos Petimezas Κωνσταντίνος Πετιμεζάς
- Born: c. 1764; Soudena near Kalavryta (now Greece)
- Died: 1824; Corinth, Greece
- Occupation: Greek revolutionary leader

Konstantinos Petimezas (Greek: Κωνσταντίνος Πετιμεζάς) (c. 1764–1824) was a Greek revolutionary leader during the Greek War of Independence and a soldier.

He was born in about 1764 in Soudena near Kalavryta. He had a brother Anagnostis and was descended from the historic Petmezades family. He left after his father was assassinated in 1804 to Zakynthos and became a Russian army officer. He entered the Filiki Etaireia and took part of the Siege of Tripoli, Battle of Levidi, Battle of Nafplio, and the Siege of Patras. He took part in the national council of Astros. In the civil war, he teamed up with Theodoros Kolokotronis.

He died in 1824.
