= Libyco-Punic Mausoleum of Dougga =

Ancient mausoleum in Tunisia

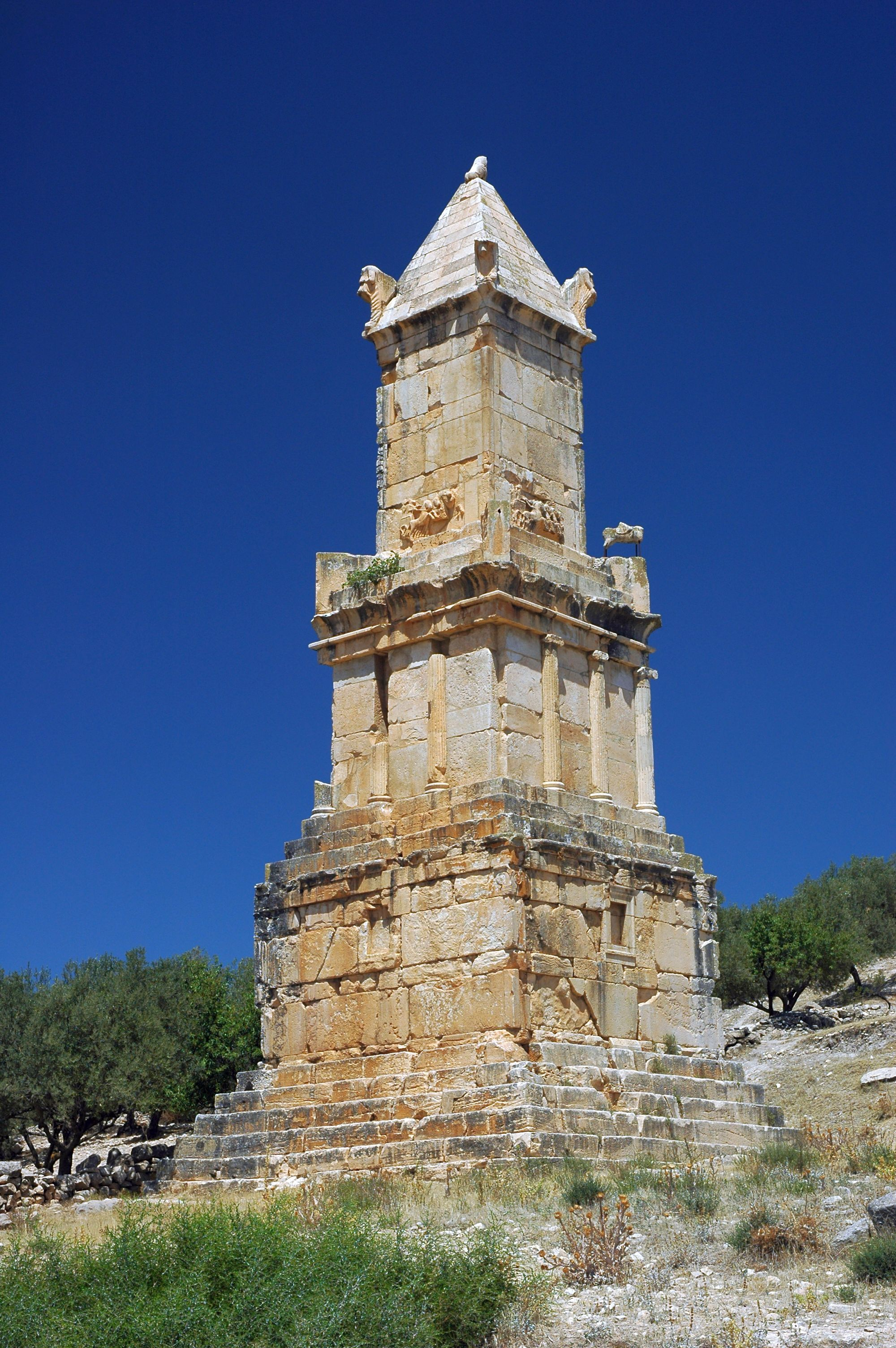
- Interactive map of Libyco-Punic Mausoleum of Dougga
- Location: Dougga, Tunisia
- Coordinates: 36.420162°N 9.220131°E
- Type: Royal Numidian Architecture
- Completion date: 2nd century BC
- Dedicated to: Atban, son of Iepmatah son of Palu

The Libyco-Punic Mausoleum of Dougga (Mausoleum of Atban) is an ancient mausoleum located in Dougga, Tunisia. It is one of three examples of the royal architecture of Numidia, which is in a good state of preservation and dates to the second century BC. It was restored by the government of French Tunisia between 1908 and 1910.

As part of the site of Dougga, the mausoleum is listed by UNESCO as a World Heritage Site. On 17 January 2012, the Tunisian government proposed it be included in a future classification of the royal mausoleums of Numidia and Mauretania and other pre-Islamic funerary monuments.

== History ==
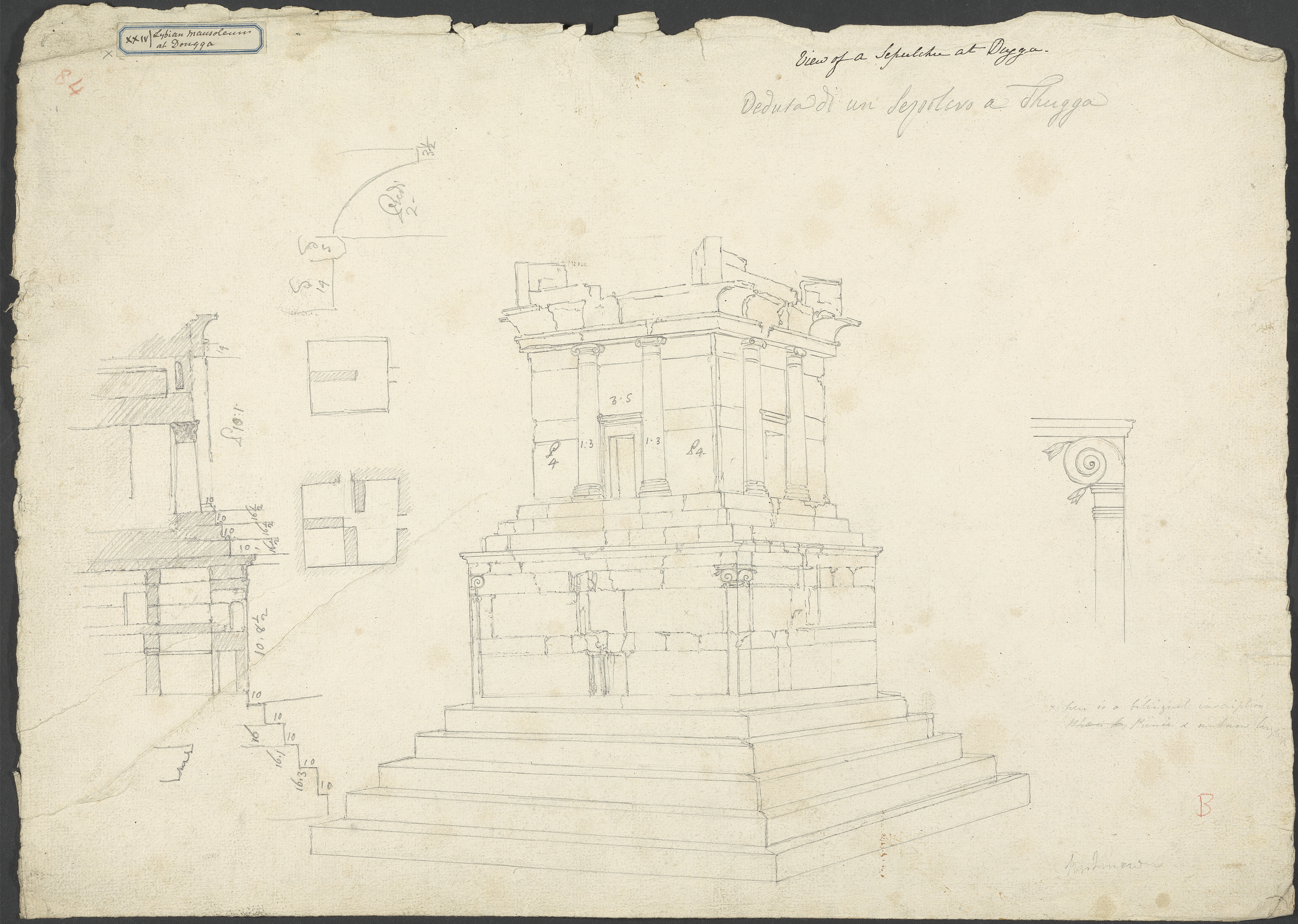
James Bruce's sketch

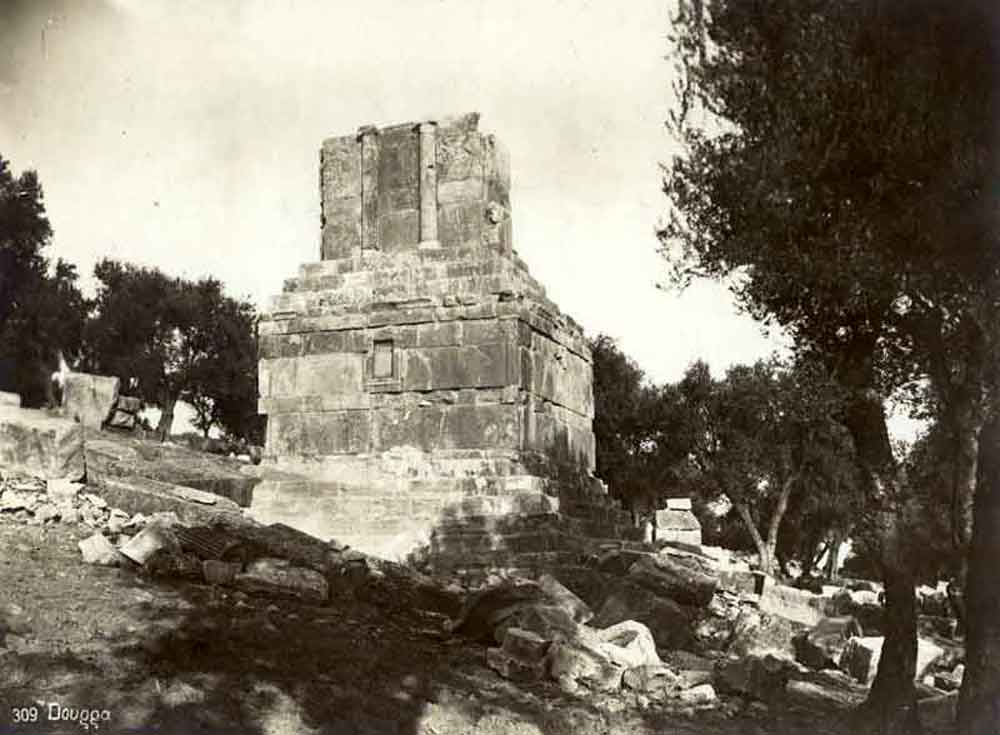
Libyco-Punic mausoleum before its renovation

The first Westerners to visit the site of Dougga arrived in the seventeenth century, becoming more frequent throughout the nineteenth century. The mausoleum was described by several of these tourists and was the object of early architectural studies at the end of the period.

In 1842, Thomas Reade, the British consul in Tunis, seriously damaged the monument in the process of removing the royal inscription which decorated it. The current state of monument is the result of a reconstruction of the pieces strewn through the surrounding area, carried out with Tunisian support by the French archaeologist Louis Poinssot between 1908 and 1910.

== Description ==
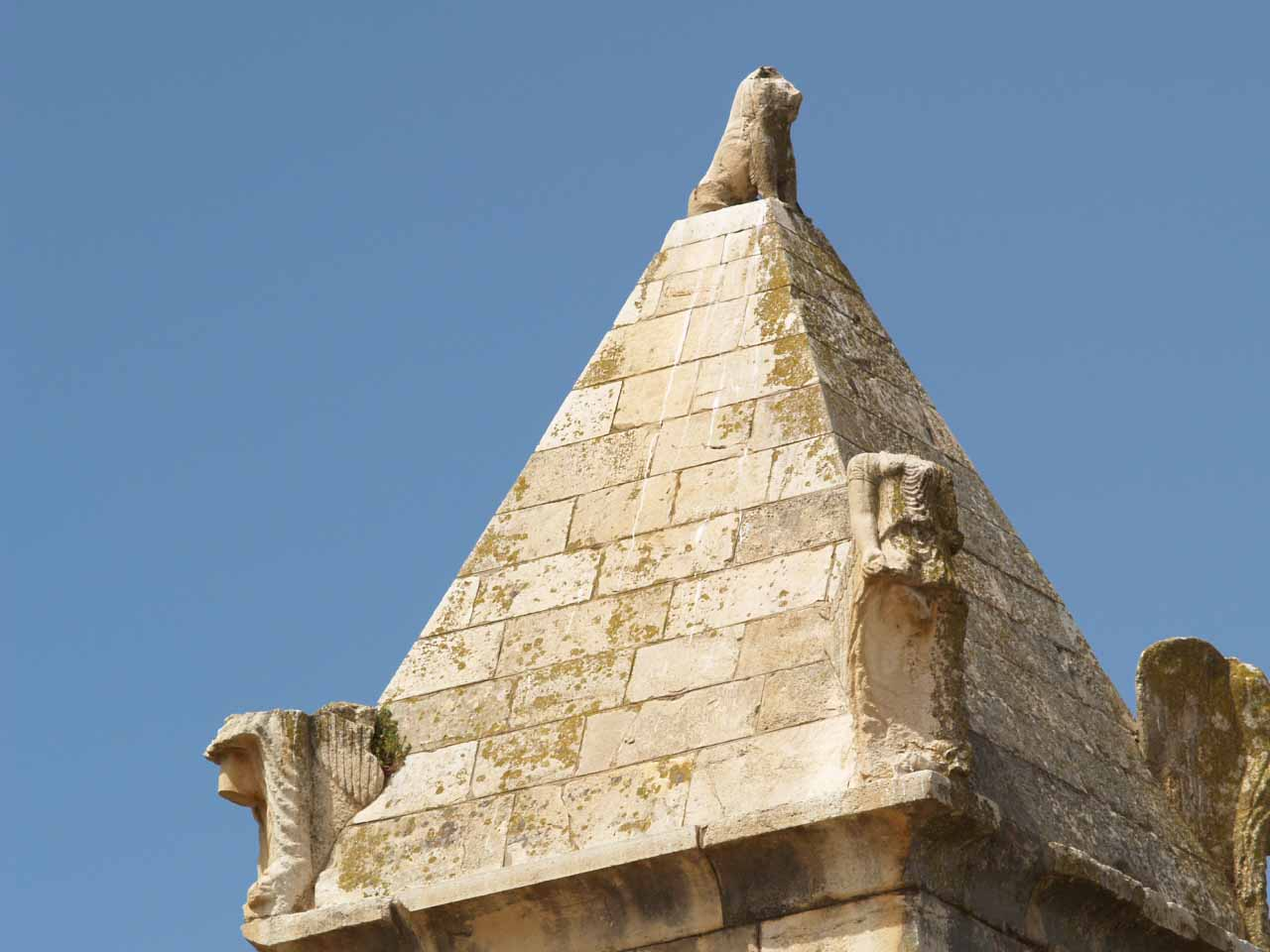
Detail of the sculptures on the upper level

The 21 m high mausoleum is divided into three levels, atop a five-step pedestal.

On the north face of the podium, the first of the three levels, an opening covered by a slab leads to the funerary chamber. The mausoleum's other faces are decorated with false openings, the corners with Aeolic pilasters.

The sepulchre's second level consists of a colonnade in the form of a shrine (naiskos). The engaged columns on each side are of the ionic order. The third and final level is the most richly decorated: in addition to pilasters on the corners similar to those on the first level, it is capped by a pyramid. Sculptural elements have survived: griffons are perched on the corners and a quadriga on one of the faces of the upper level.

== Bilingual Punic and Libyan inscription ==
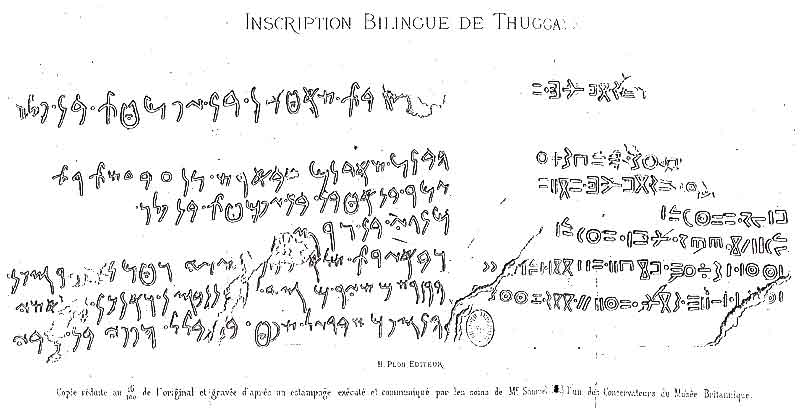
The bilingual Punic-Libyan Inscription of Dougga

The bilingual Numidian and Punic-Libyan Inscription now in the British Museum enabled the Numidian alphabet to be deciphered:

Here is the tomb of Atban, son of Iepmatah, son of Palu: the stoneworkrs were Aborsh son of Abdashtart Mengy son of Oursken, Zamar son of Atban son of Iepmatah son of Palu, and among the members of his house were Zezy, Temen and Oursken; the carpenters were Mesdel son of Nenpsen and Anken son of Ashy; the metalworkers were Shepet son of Bilel and Pepy son of Beby.

== Interpretation ==
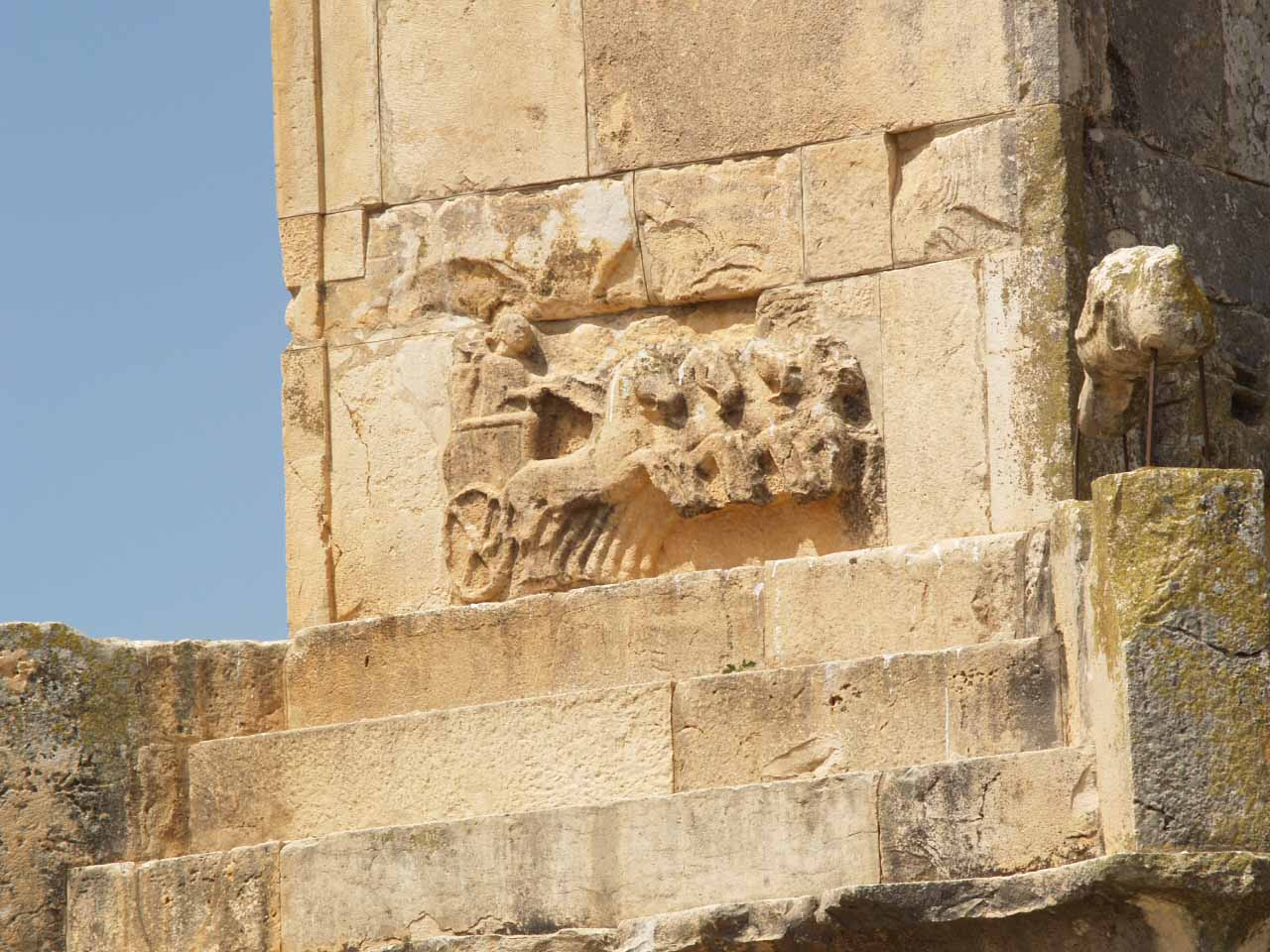
Detail of the upper frieze

The Libyo-Punic Mausoleum has often been connected with the funerary monuments of Asia Minor and necropolises of Alexandria of the third and second centuries BC.

On account of the inscription, the tomb is considered to be dedicated to Atban son of Iepmatah son of Palu. It has recently been determined that the inscription, which is located beside one of the false doors of the podium, was not unique. Another inscription, irreparably damaged, would have enumerated the titulary of the tomb's occupant.

According to recent studies, the names mentioned on the surviving inscription are merely the monument's builders: the architect and the various head artisans. The monument would have been built by the citizens of the city for a Numidian prince. It is thought to have possibly been a tomb or cenotaph intended for Massinissa.

== See also ==
- Royal Mausoleum of Mauretania
- Madghacen
- El Khroub
- Numidia
- Ancient Carthage

== Bibliography ==
- Gabriel Camps, « Dougga », Encyclopédie berbère, tome XVI, éd. Edisud, Aix-en-Provence, 1992, pp. 2522–2527 ISBN 2857445814
- Gabriel Camps, Les Berbères, mémoire et identité, coll. Babel, éd. Actes Sud / Leméac, Arles / Montréal, 2007 ISBN 9782742769223
- Pierre Gros, L'architecture romaine du début du III^{e} siècle av. J.-C. à la fin du Haut-Empire, tome 2 « Maisons, palais, villas et tombeaux », éd. Picard, Paris, 2001 ISBN 2708405330
- Mustapha Khanoussi, Dougga, éd. Agence de mise en valeur du patrimoine et de promotion culturelle, Tunis, 2008 ISBN 9789973954336
- Edward Lipinski [sous la dir. de], Dictionnaire de la civilisation phénicienne et punique, éd. Brépols, Paris, 1992 ISBN 2503500331
- Louis Poinssot, « La restauration du mausolée de Dougga », CRAI, vol. 54, 9, 1910, pp. 780–787 (online)
- Jan-Willem Salomoson & Claude Poinssot, « Le mausolée libyco-punique de Dougga et les papiers du comte Borgia », CRAI, vol. 103, 2, 1959, pp. 141–149 (online)
- Hédi Slim & Nicolas Fauqué, La Tunisie antique. De Hannibal à saint Augustin, éd. Mengès, Paris, 2001 ISBN 285620421X
