= Thomas Reade (British Army officer) =

English army officer and consul in Tunis (1782–1849)

Sir Thomas Reade
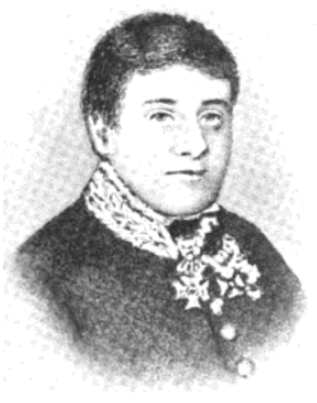
- Born: 1782
- Died: 1 August 1849 (aged 66–67) Tunis, Tunisia
- Allegiance: United Kingdom
- Branch: British Army
- Service years: 1799–1849
- Rank: Colonel
- Conflicts: French Revolutionary Wars; Anglo-Russian Invasion of Holland; Ferrol Expedition; Egypt Campaign; Napoleonic Wars; Peninsular War; Siege of Genoa
- Awards: Order of Saint Ferdinand and of Merit
- Spouse: Agnes Clogg (m. 1824)

Colonel Sir Thomas Reade (1782 – 1 August 1849) was a British Army officer during the Napoleonic Wars, known also as a collector.

In 1799, at the age of sixteen, he ran away from home to enlist in the Army and participated in campaigns in Holland, Egypt and America, as well as postings across Europe. Major Reade served as Deputy Quartermaster General at the 1814 Siege of Genoa. He was knighted in 1815. When Napoleon was defeated and exiled to Saint Helena, Reade was one of his principal guards.

He married Agnes Clogg on 8 September 1824.

He was appointed consul general in Tunis on 10 May 1836. On 29 April 1841, he convinced Ahmad I ibn Mustafa, the bey (ruler) of Tunis, to abolish the slave trade.

Reade was also a scholar and antiquarian and collected a range of artefacts, much of which are held in the British Museum today.

In Tunis, Reade discovered the Reade Punic inscriptions, some of the earliest Carthaginian tombstones to be discovered. Later Reade was responsible for seriously damaging the Libyco-Punic Mausoleum of Dougga in 1842 for the purposes of stealing the monument's Libyco-Punic inscription. The team commissioned to remove the inscription did it in such a maladroit way that the two upper floors of the mausoleum collapsed as a result.

Reade died at his residence in Tunis on 1 August 1849. He is buried (or has a memorial) in Congleton Parish Church with a tomb sculpted by Thomas Gaffin.
