= 8th Line Battalion, King's German Legion =

Hanoverian unit in British service

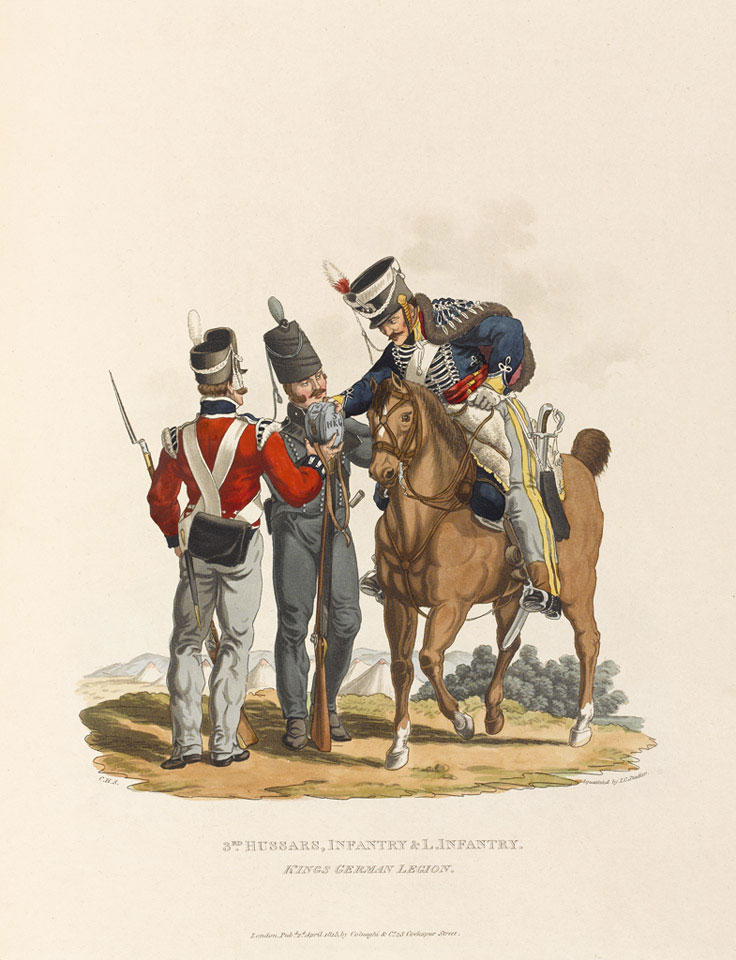
Troops of the King's German Legion, with a line infantryman on the left

The 8th Line Battalion of the King's German Legion was a Hanoverian unit in British service during the Napoleonic Wars.

== Chronology ==
The unit was raised during the year 1806 as the last out of eight line battalions that the Legion levied in total. It was only half completed when the British Expeditionary force withdrew from Hanover early 1806 and subsequently filled up as recruits became available.

The battalion was initially brigaded with the 7th Line Battalion of the Legion. It served from 1805 until 1816 in Ireland, Walcheren, Copenhagen, Sicily, Peninsula and Belgium. It took part in the Northern Italian campaign, resulting in the capture of Genoa in April 1814.

On 18 June 1815, during the Battle of Waterloo, the battalion was nearly wiped out during the fighting in the centre of Wellington's battle line and lost a flag.

== Uniforms and equipment ==
Uniform and Equipment of the Legion's Line battalions was of standard British pattern of the time. In accord it was repeatedly revised during the years from 1803 until 1815. In general it was composed of:

- Red uniform with dark blue cuffs and collar, laced with regimental lace
- Grey legwear
- White leather equipment with black leather pouch
- Brown Bess musket
- Stovepipe shako, later Belgic shako

The principal distinction from British units was that the backpack was of dark blue colour rather than black.

== Sources ==
- Nafziger, George F.; Gioannini, Marco (2002). The defense of the Napoleonic kingdom of Northern Italy, 1813-1814. Westport, Conn.: Praeger. ISBN 978-0-313-07531-5.

== General references ==
- Beamish, North Ludlow (1997a) [1832]. History of the King's German Legion. Vol. 1, Reprint. Naval and Military Press. ISBN 0-9522011-0-0.
- Beamish, North Ludlow (1997b) [1837]. History of the King's German Legion. Vol. 2, Reprint. Naval and Military Press. ISBN 0-9522011-0-0. OL 23440828M.
- Chappell, Mike (2000a). The King's German Legion (1) 1803–1812. Botley, Oxford: Osprey Publishing. ISBN 1-85532-996-4.
- Chappell, Mike (2000b). The King's German Legion (2) 1812–1816. Botley, Oxford: Osprey Publishing. ISBN 1-85532-997-2.
