= Robert Henry MacFarlane =

British Army officer (1771–1843)

General Sir Robert Henry MacFarlane, GCH, KCB, (19 April 1771 – 6 June 1843) was a British Army officer during the Napoleonic Wars.

== Biography ==
He was born in Calcutta, the son of Captain Robert MacFarlane, 9th of Gartartan.

He joined the British Army as an Ensign on 26 May 1780 and was promoted Lieutenant on 22 May 1793, Captain on 25 September 1793, Major on 12 November 1794, Lieutenant-Colonel on 19 September 1794, Colonel on 1 January 1800, Major-General on 25 April 1808, Lieutenant-General on 4 June 1813 and General 22 July 1830.

MacFarlane was "a gallant and highly distinguished officer", who accompanied the expedition to Copenhagen in 1807. He served subsequently in Sicily as second-in-command under Lord William Bentinck. In 1823 he was made Colonel of the 89th Regiment of Foot, transferring in 1837 to be Colonel of the 32nd (Cornwall) Regiment of Foot, a position he held until his death.

== Family ==
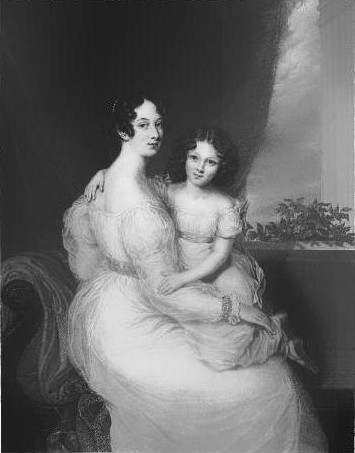
Lady Maria Gertrude MacFarlane, engraving from a painting by Derby.

On 10 February 1815, at Palermo, MacFarlane married Maria Gertrude, eldest daughter of G. Henry Vankemper, (a captain in the Dutch Navy and Consul of the Netherlands at Tripoli).

== Notes ==
Military offices
Preceded by Sir Samuel Venables Hinde	Colonel of the 32nd (Cornwall) Regiment of Foot; 1837–1843	Succeeded by Sir John Buchan
Preceded by Sir George Beckwith	Colonel of the 89th Regiment of Foot; 1823–1837	Succeeded by Sir Charles Bulkeley Egerton
