= Athanasios Petimezas =

Bust of Petimezas

Athanasios Petimezas or Petmezas (Greek: Αθανάσιος Πετ[ι]μεζάς, c. 1767–1804) was a leading Greek armatolos in the late Ottoman-era Peloponnese.

== Life ==
Athanasios Petimezas was born c. 1767 at Soudena near Kalavryta. As a child, possibly around the age of ten, he was taken by the Turks to Smyrna, with the intention to make him a Janissary. After six years, Petimezas was able to escape, secretly boarding a ship bound for his native Peloponnese. On the way, the ship was boarded by Tripolitanian corsairs, who took the crew captive to Tripoli. There Petimezas remained imprisoned for some time, until his winning a jumping contest resulted in being let free.

Once back in his home, Petimezas became a klepht, quickly coming to lead a large warband in attacks against the Ottomans in the northwest Peloponnese. To get rid of this menace, the local Ottoman administration awarded him the armatoliki of Kalavryta and its region; at the same time, they asked the pasha of the Morea to send them reinforcements against Petimezas and his men. To this end, the pasha set a trap: Muslims from the village of Lalas were to raid the region of Kalavryta as bandits, obliging Petimezas to march against them. The pasha would then send troops, ostensibly to his assistance, but with the real purpose of eliminating him. Petimezas became aware of this plan, and moved first, by attacking and eliminating the Lalaians at Sirbani.

After that, he resumed his attacks against the local Turks, and in 1785 he joined the union of armatoloi of the Peloponnese initiated by Zacharias Barbitsiotis. Petimezas became the union's deputy leader, after Theodoros Kolokotronis. In 1796, while Petimezas was at Mani, the Ottomans attacked and killed his brothers Ioannis and Antonios, and his cousins Stefos and Dimitrios, with some of their men, near Mega Spilaion. This attack was apparently instigated by a Greek rival, Sotirios Charalambis of Zarouchla; upon his return from Mani, Petimezas attacked Caharalmbis' tower house and killed its inhabitants, torching the tower as he left. In the aftermath, he again resumed his attacks against the Turks, reportedly killing about a hundred of them, before he was forced to flee to Amfissa to escape pursuit.

In 1800, he was able to return, as the Ottomans again awarded him the armatoliki of Kalavryta and Vostitsa. Nevertheless, as he remained a dangerous opponent, on 11 June 1804, the Turks, aided by another rival, Asimakis Skaltsas, attacked Petimezas at his tower house in Soudena. Petimezas resisted for some time, but was killed by his servant, who had been bribed by the Ottomans.

== Family ==
His sons Vasileios and Nikolaos fled to British-held Zakynthos, and later became important leaders in the Greek War of Independence. Other branches of the Petimezas family also played a role in the War of Independence, and provided several generals of the independent Greek state.

== Sources ==
- Doganis, Th. (1930). Μεγάλη Στρατιωτικὴ καὶ Ναυτικὴ Ἐγκυκλοπαιδεία. Tόμος Πέμπτος: Νάβα–Σαρακηνοί [Great Military and Naval Encyclopaedia. Volume V: Nave–Saracens] (in Greek). Athens: Ἔκδοσις Μεγάλης Στρατιωτικῆς καὶ Ναυτικῆς Ἐγκυκλοπαιδείας. pp. 314–315. OCLC 31255024.
