= 1st Regiment Greek Light Infantry =

1st Greek Light Infantry Regiment
- Active: 1810–16
- Disbanded: 1816
- Country: United States of the Ionian Islands
- Allegiance: United Kingdom
- Branch: British Army
- Type: Light infantry
- Role: Expeditionary warfare
- Size: 1-2 battalions
- Garrison/HQ: Zakynthos, United States of the Ionian Islands
- Patron: Prince Frederick, Duke of York and Albany
- Engagements: Napoleonic Wars; Adriatic Campaign; Siege of Santa Maura; War of the Sixth Coalition; Siege of Genoa

Commanders
- First Commander: Richard Church
- Notable commanders: Theodoros Kolokotronis

The 1st Regiment Greek Light Infantry (1810–12) was a light infantry regiment, founded as a local establishment in British service consisting mostly of Greek and Albanian enlisted men and Greek and British officers that served during the Napoleonic Wars. Later it became a regular British Army regiment as the 1st Greek Light Infantry ("The Duke of York's") (1812–16). It had no official association with the modern state of Greece or the Filiki Eteria or any Greek War of Independence groups; however, several future leaders of the War of Independence fought in its ranks, as did a number of rank-and-file klephts and armatoloi.

== Background ==
The British Army during the Napoleonic Wars was small (~40,000 troops) at the outset compared to those of other European countries like France and Prussia. The British Army used foreign volunteers, such as French Royalists, Germans, Greeks and Corsicans to supplement its forces. In 1813 one fifth of the army, 52,000 men, were such volunteers. The British Army in 1813 contained over 250,000 men.

Meanwhile, the Ottoman Empire, which ruled the majority of Greek-speaking areas at the time, participated in on-again, off-again alliances with France under Napoleon. Many Greeks fleeing Ottoman persecution or local disputes on the mainland ended up in the Ionian Islands, which were beyond the reach of Ottoman authorities. When Britain became the enemy of the Ottoman Empire, it provided, if not an actual chance to fight for national liberation, at least a possibility of harming a foreign power that was increasingly viewed as hostile to the Modern Greek Enlightenment and under stress due to the rise of nationalism in the empire.

When Britain took over the Ionian Islands, it initially relied on small numbers of British and British-foreign troops along with the local volunteer militias, the largest of which was on Zakynthos (Zante), numbering some 2,000 men, with another approximately 2,000 dispersed over the other islands. These were armed at their own expense, and unpaid. They were drawn from the population of the islands and from mainland Greece and Albania, from men with varying levels of experience. A decision was taken to form an elite, paid unit from among the experienced troops, and to give them additional training.

== Service history ==
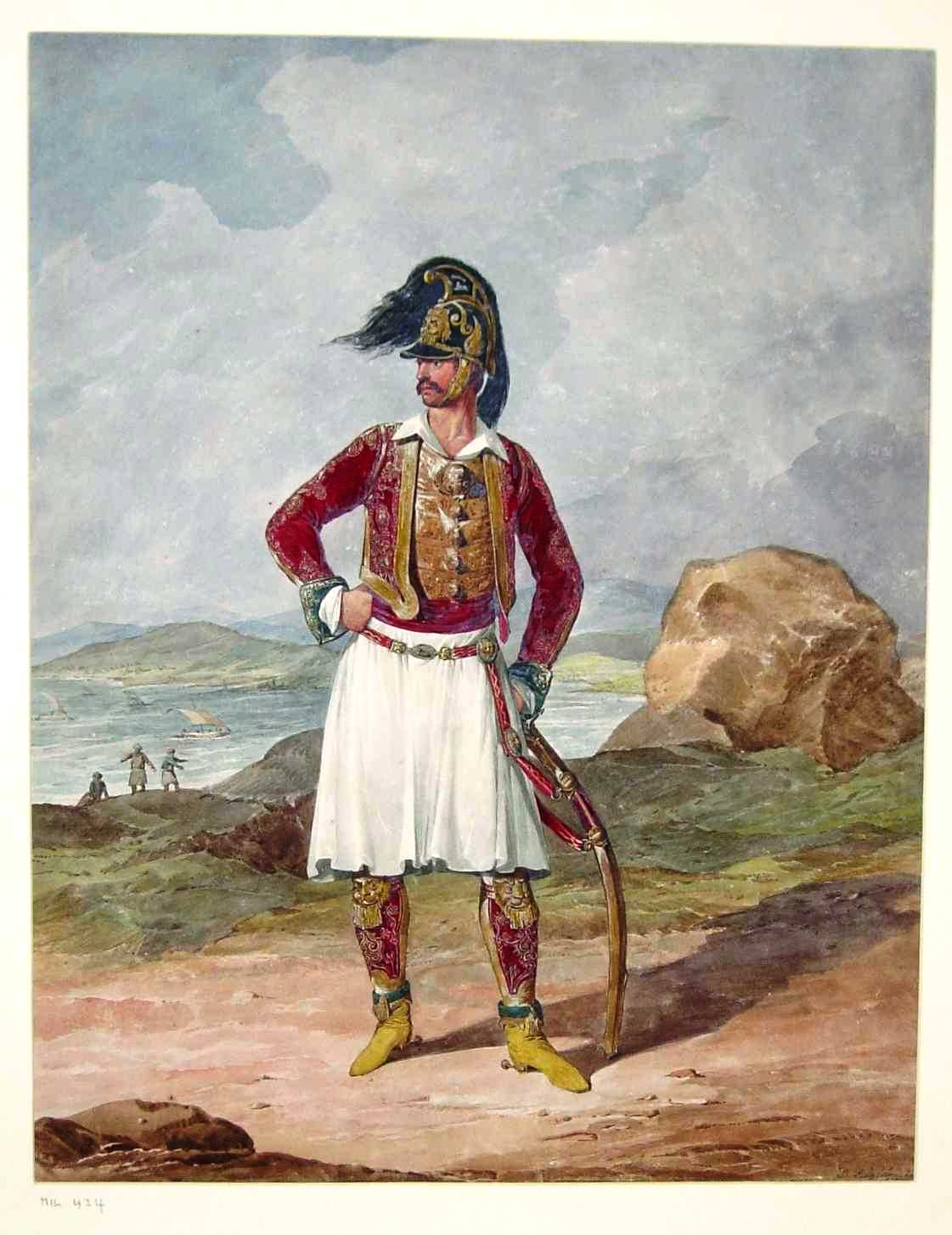
1813 portrait of Church as a regimental major

The regiment was raised in the Ionian Islands in March 1810 by then-Captain Richard Church who already had experience managing foreign (i.e. non-British) troops from his previous appointment in the Royal Corsican Rangers. At the outset, its authorized strength was one battalion of 800 men, its actual strength was 548 officers and men when it took part in its first action, the successful capture of Lefkada (then called Santa Maura due to still-lingering Venetian influence) from the French, but suffered high casualties. Later, it was moved to Zante (Zakynthos) which served as its base and reached its full authorized strength. In 1811, Church was promoted major, and Brigadier General Robert Oswald, late of the 35th Foot as colonel for the Greek Light Infantry Corps, which at that time consisted of only the nominal battalion-sized 1st Regiment. Recruitment began for the second regiment, in order to build up to the corps-level strength, after which Oswald was promoted brigadier for the corps.

The regiment was put on British establishment in 1812, becoming an official regiment of the British Army, and increased to an authorized strength of 1,129 men of all ranks. It was sent to suppress an insurrection in Montenegro in June of that year, but baulked at being sent to Sicily in 1813. On 22 May 1813 the unit was reviewed and found to be in a "very indifferent state, with no field officer present and company officers at a loss to discipline the men"; Church was badly wounded in the arm in the attack on Lefkada and did not return to the regiment after recuperating. Instead, he was promoted lieutenant colonel went on to become colonel commandant the 2nd Greek Light Infantry, and his second-in-command went with him. At least one replacement major was cashiered for an unspecified offence, and another transferred out. This led to the gazetting of Lt. Col. Henry Cuyler of the 85th Foot as colonel commandant of the regiment on 2 February 1813. A 250-man detachment took part in the British Siege of Genoa and La Spezia in the spring of 1814. The regiment disbanded in 1816.

== Organisation & administration ==
Officers were Greek, apart from British regimental staff. The day-to-day language of the regiment was Greek; however, in order to avoid confusion when the regiment or elements of the regiment were brigaded with other British units, English was used for all drill commands. This was generally the practice in all foreign units recruited by the British at the time. Elements of the regiment were often brigaded with other units, for instance, the assaults on Santa Maura, Genoa and La Spezzia also included elements of the Calabrian Free Corps.

== Uniforms and equipment ==
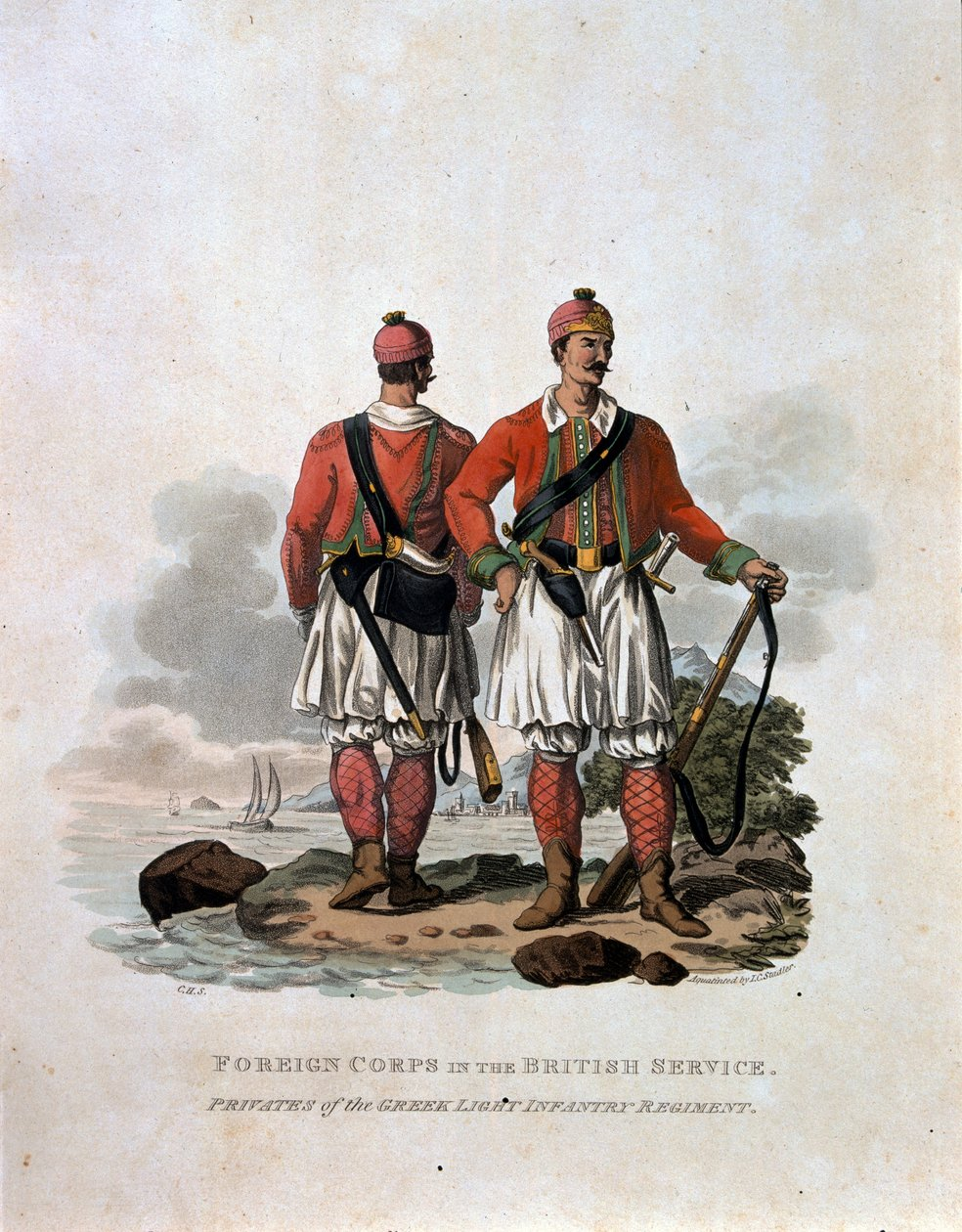
1812 illustration of two 2nd Regiment Greek Light Infantry soldiers. The uniforms of the 1st were similar, but had yellow instead of green facings and laced shoes instead of boots.

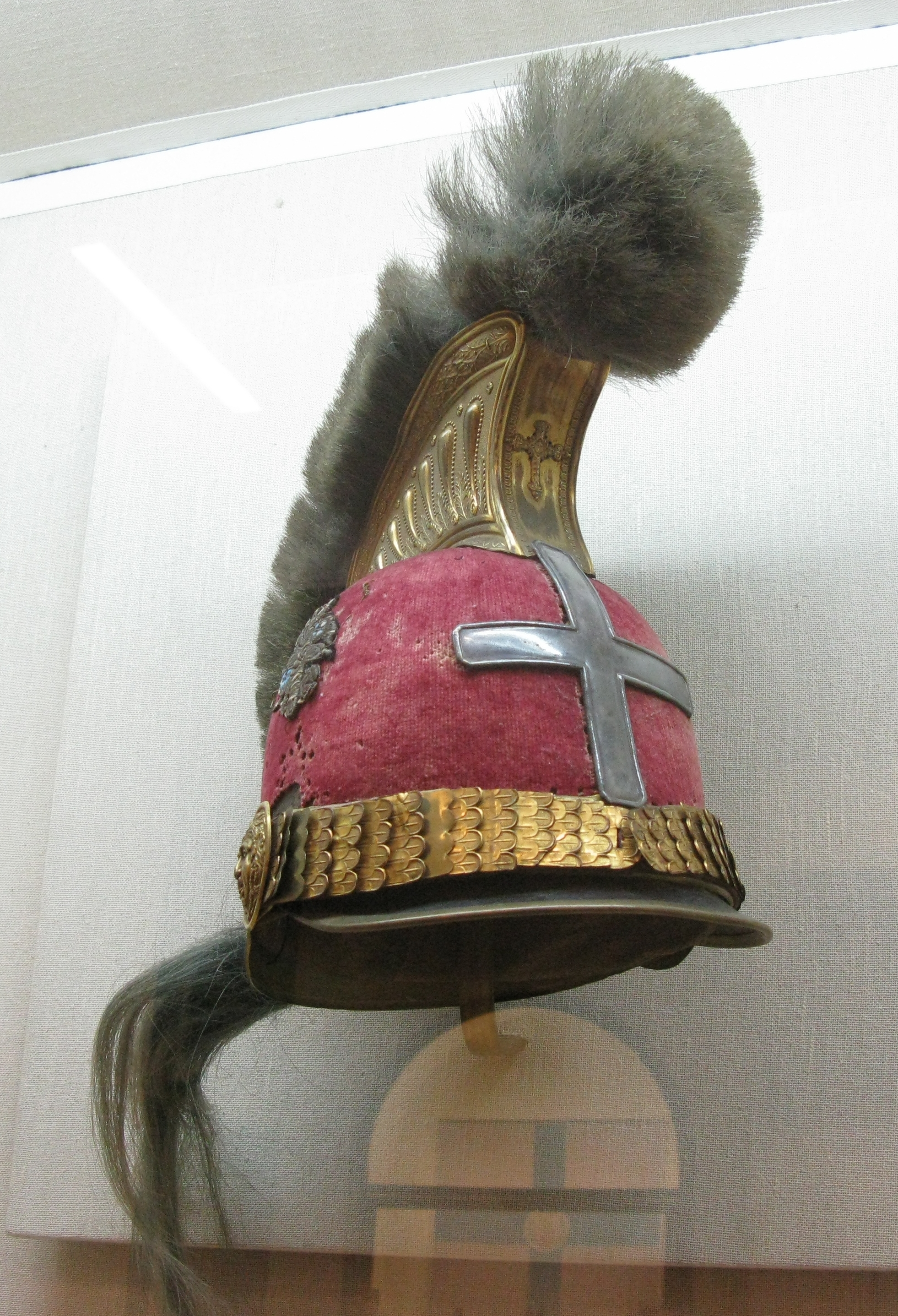
Theodoros Kolokotronis' regimental helmet; the cross is a later personal addition.

The men of the regiment were reported as wearing "Albanian dress" in 1810; their orders stated "clothing and accoutrements were to be made in the Albanian fashion". Enlisted men wore red jackets with yellow cuffs, facings, and trim; for the officers, these were gold and white, over a white shirt, foustanella, breeches and stockings. Headwear was usually a red cap (resembling a fez or small beret, like the fario of the Greek Evzones). In some contemporary prints, the officers and men are depicted wearing fillets (kefalodesmoi) instead of caps. Officers wore a crested red dragoon-style helmet, as depicted in the drawing of Richard Church and of later drawings of Greek War of Independence (after 1821) leader Theodoros Kolokotronis who continued to wear the helmet. Footwear consisted of what are described as "tied sandals" and in illustrations resemble the moccasin-like tsarouhia of the Evzones, only they lack pompoms and have extra lacing to keep them secure. Officers are depicted as wearing taller, higher-heeled three-quarter shoes or short boots. The troops refused to carry British knapsacks, only haversacks.

The regiment's soldiers were armed initially with sawed-off muskets, (Note: Probably kariofilia (Greek: καριοφίλια), klepht-style sawed-off musket carbines originally made by Italian gun-makers named Carolo e Figli ("Charles & Sons"), whence their Greek name. See καριοφίλι.) but gradually came to prefer British-issue muskets and by 1813 this is what they carried. They wore sword bayonets on waist belts instead of shoulder or cross-belts (this was also common among British light infantry and rifle units). Officers carried longer sabre-style weapons, just as their light infantry counterparts in Western European armies did. The men were supposed to be issued pistols, but it was "thought prudent" not to issue them to the men as they were, in the view of one historian 'always volatile', although officers carried. An 1812 print by Charles Hamilton Smith shows enlisted men of the 2nd Regiment Greek Light Infantry wearing pistols, another two by Goddard depict an enlisted man with a single pistol, possibly French pattern, and the other an officer of the 1st with a brace of pistols and enlisted man with one.

Kolokotronis sported a brace of engraved pistols and an ornate cavalry-style cuirass, which are now on display at the National Historical Museum, Athens. Richard Church was depicted wearing a similar helmet-and-cuirass outfit plus metal greaves and knee protectors with gilt lion's heads along with a braided version of the uniform of the 2nd Regiment Greek Light Infantry, in a painting now housed in the Royal Gallery. Both of these romanticized outfits imitating Ancient Greek styles were probably intended for ceremony and were not worn in their entirety in combat, although Kolokotronis did sometimes wear the helmet when he fought, even after the regiment disbanded. As officers, they both would have had the privilege of wearing pistols, and in Kolokotronis' career as a klepht, the carrying of more than one pistol would not have been uncommon. (Note: Nor was it unknown among British officers)

== See also ==
- Category:1st Regiment Greek Light Infantry officers
- Greek Legion (Septinsular Republic), a counterpart unit raised by the Russians
- Albanian Regiment (France), a counterpart unit raised by the French
- Royal Corsican Rangers
- Royal Sicilian Regiment
