= Siege of Santa Maura (1810) =

- Part of the Adriatic campaign of 1807–1814
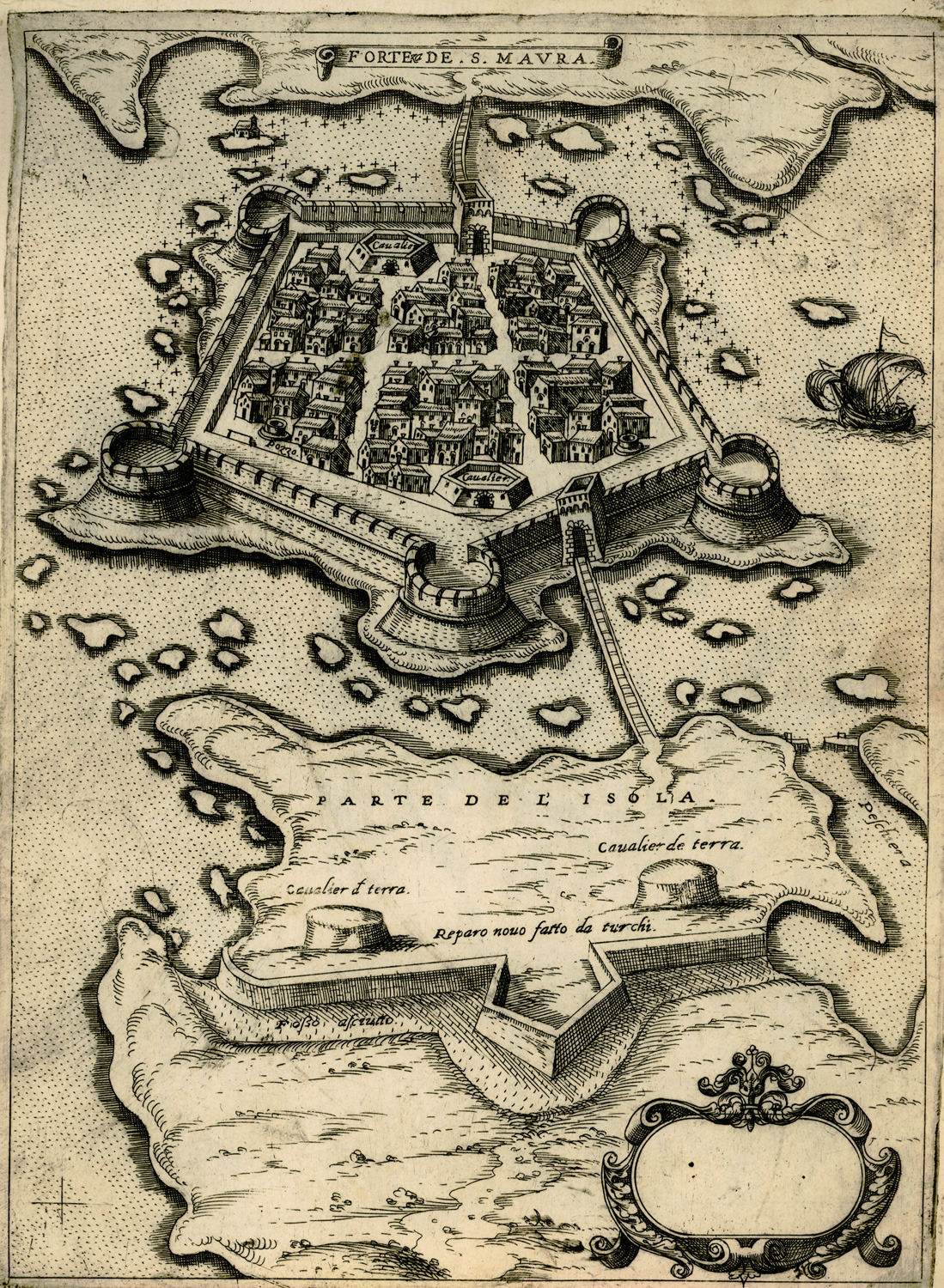
- 1574 engraving of the Castle of Santa Maura, the site of the siege
Date	March and April 1810
Location	Castle of Santa Maura, Lefkada 38°50′40″N 20°43′13″E
Result	British victory

Belligerents
United Kingdom	France

Commanders and leaders
Hudson Lowe; Richard Church; Theodoros Kolokotronis; Konstantis Petmezas	Louis Camus

Strength
4,000	836

The siege of Santa Maura in March and April 1810 was fought between the British and the French troops on the island of Lefkada (then known as Santa Maura). Santa Maura had belonged to the First French Empire since 1807, and was garrisoned by a mixed force of French regulars and men of the locally raised, Greco-Albanian Albanian Regiment. The British troops that landed on the island were also supported by Greek and Corsican volunteer troops. Mistrust of the Greco-Albanian troops by the French command, and the presence of Greeks in the British force, resulted in the defection of the Albanian Regiment's men to the British, hastening the surrender of the island.

== Background ==
The island of Santa Maura, along with the other Ionian Islands, fell under French rule in 1807, after the Treaty of Tilsit. In October 1809, the British attacked and captured the islands of Zakynthos (Zante), Cephalonia, Kythira (Cerigo), and Ithaca. These islands were defended by small garrisons, with a few dozen regular French soldiers and larger numbers of men of the locally raised Albanian Regiment (400 on Zakynthos, 145 on Cephalonia, 46 on Ithaca, and 27 on Kythira) on each island. These forces were completely inadequate to offer anything but a token resistance; the captured men were transferred to Italy as prisoners of war, but more than a few of the Albanian Regiment's men—up to about half in Zakynthos—simply scattered into the countryside and resumed their traditional guerrilla habits. Most of these escapees, as well as those taken prisoner, were soon induced to enter British service in what eventually became the 1st Regiment Greek Light Infantry. Over 70% of the Albanian Regiment's men on the four islands switched to the British, including most of the officers.

== British landing on Santa Maura ==
Before the landing of the main force, the British sent Lt. Colonel Hudson Lowe along with two Greek chieftains, Theodoros Kolokotronis and Konstantis Petmezas, to scout the situation on the island. Kolokotronis made contact with the local Greco-Albanian troops, and urged them to surrender, but the latter refused, citing their oath to fight with the French. After that, the British landed their main force, some 4,000 strong, comprising British and Sicilian troops as well as Greek and Corsican (Royal Corsican Rangers) volunteer detachments. The initial fighting was hard, but the British forces managed to overrun the French defences, capturing a number of gun batteries. In these battles, the Greeks under Kolokotronis and Richard Church distinguished themselves, and Church was wounded.

After these setbacks, the French commander, General Camus, retired with his French troops to the Castle of Santa Maura. Distrustful of the loyalties of the Albanian Regiment, he left its men outside the fortress. This decision not only left the lightly equipped men of the Albanian Regiment exposed to the elements, but Camus also refused to give shelter to their families in the fortress. As a result, the entire Albanian Regiment detachment of 823 men, apart from 13 men the French held as hostages, defected to the British. The British then proceeded to besiege the fortress, subjecting it to heavy bombardment, until the fortress surrendered.

== Sources ==
- Kallivretakis, Leonidas (2003). "Ένοπλα Ελληνικά σώματα στη δίνη των Ναπολεοντείων πολέμων (1798-1815)" [Greek armed corps in the throes of the Napoleonic wars (1798-1815)]. Ιστορία του Νέου Ελληνισμού 1770-2000, Τόμος 1: Η Οθωμανική κυριαρχία, 1770-1821 [History of Modern Hellenism 1770-2000, Volume 1: Ottoman rule, 1770-1821] (in Greek). Athens: Ellinika Grammata. pp. 185–200. hdl:10442/8780. ISBN 960-406-540-8.
- Moschonas, Nikolaos (1975). "Τα Ιόνια Νησιά κατά την περίοδο 1797-1821" [The Ionian Islands in the period 1797-1821]. In Christopoulos, Georgios A. & Bastias, Ioannis K. (eds.). Ιστορία του Ελληνικού Έθνους [History of the Greek Nation] (in Greek). Vol. ΙΑ: Ο Ελληνισμός υπό ξένη κυριαρχία (περίοδος 1669 - 1821), Τουρκοκρατία - Λατινοκρατία [Hellenism under Foreign Rule (Period 1669 - 1821), Turkocracy – Latinocracy]. Athens: Ekdotiki Athinon. pp. 382–402. ISBN 978-960-213-100-8.
- Pappas, Nicholas Charles (1991). Greeks in Russian Military Service in the Late 18th and Early 19th Centuries. Thessaloniki: Institute for Balkan Studies.
