= Lighthouse of Genoa =

Lanterna
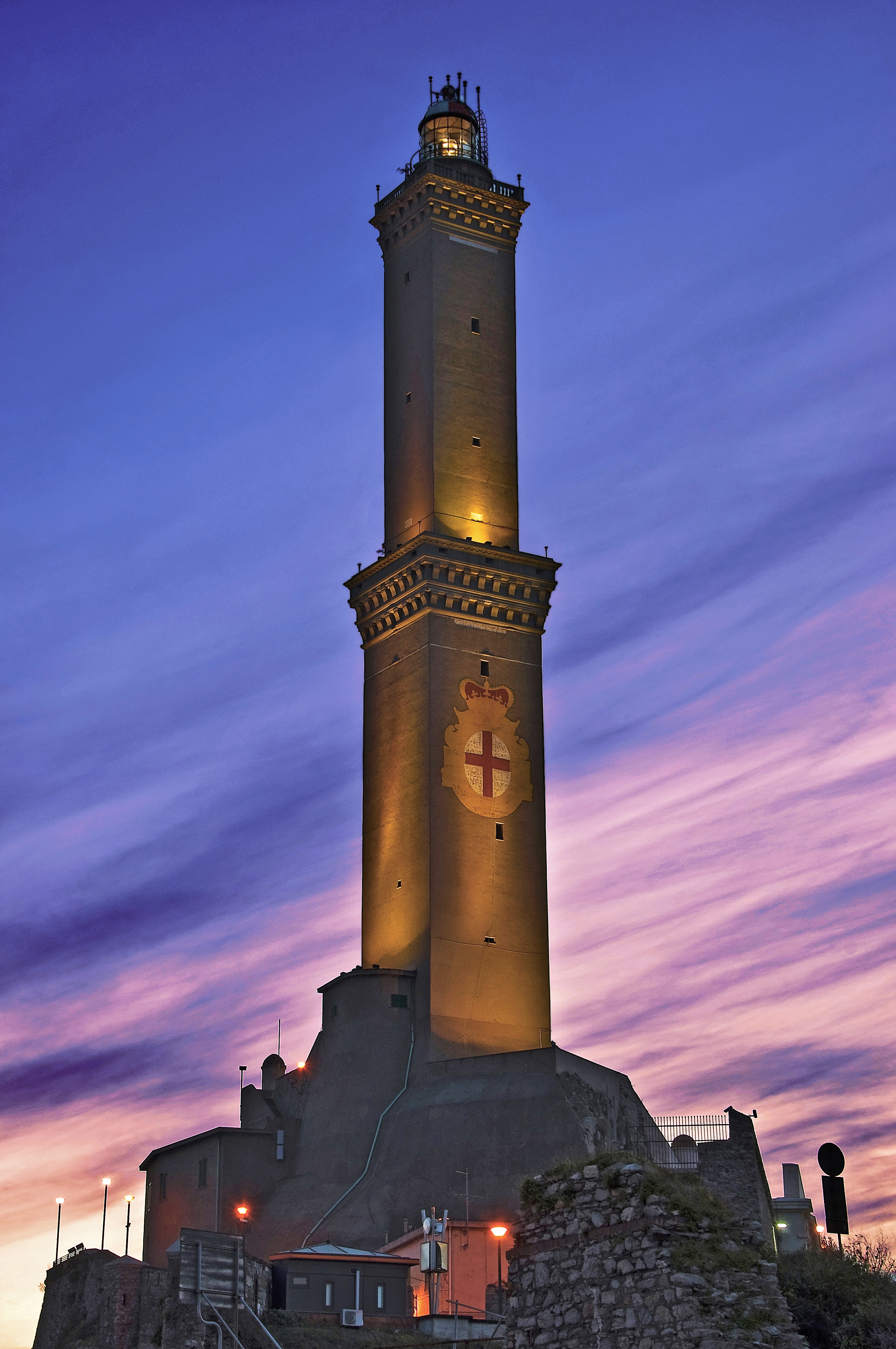
- Lighthouse of Genoa at sunset
- Location: Genoa, Liguria, Italy
- Coordinates: 44°24′16.44″N 8°54′17.00″E

Tower
- Constructed: 1128 (some sources 1161)
- Foundation: Natural emplaced
- Construction: Stone
- Automated: 1936
- Height: 76 m (249 ft)
- Shape: Two square prisms
- Markings: Unpainted, save for the city arms on the lower stage; lantern painted with red-and-white checkerboard pattern
- Operator: Marina Militare
- Heritage: Italian national heritage

Light
- First lit: 1543 (current tower)
- Focal height: 117 m (384 ft)
- Lens: Wood fire, later first order Fresnel lens
- Light source: electric power distribution
- Intensity: main: AL 1000 W reserve: LABI 100 W
- Range: main: 25 nautical miles (46 km; 29 mi) reserve: 18 nautical miles (33 km; 21 mi)
- Characteristic: two white flashes, separated by 5 s, every 20 s.
- Italy no.: 1569 E.F

The Lighthouse of Genoa (Italian: Lanterna di Genova; Ligurian: Lanterna de Zêna), often known as simply La Lanterna (Ligurian: a Lanterna), is the main light serving the Port of Genoa, the capital of Liguria, Italy. Besides being an important aid to night navigation in the vicinity, the tower serves as a symbol and a landmark for the city of Genoa. Rebuilt in its current shape in 1543 replacing the former lighthouse, it is the world's fourth oldest lighthouse, following the Tower of Hercules in A Coruña, Spain, Hook Head Lighthouse in Ireland, and Kõpu Lighthouse, on the island of Hiiumaa, Estonia. Built of masonry, at 76 m (249 ft), it is constructed in two square portions, each one capped by a terrace. The whole structure is crowned by a lantern from which the light is shone.

Between 1543 and the construction of the lighthouse on Île Vierge, France in 1902, it was also the tallest lighthouse in the world. It is now the world's fifth tallest lighthouse, the second tallest lighthouse built in traditional masonry after Île Vierge, and the tallest lighthouse of Italy and the whole Mediterranean Sea. When measured as a whole with the natural rock on which it stands, as it is commonly perceived and represented, its total height is 112 m (367 ft), which makes it the second tallest lighthouse in the world, the tallest in Europe, and the tallest in the world when only traditional lighthouses are considered.

== History of the tower ==
=== Location ===
The Lanterna is on the hill of San Benigno at some little distance from the Sampierdarena neighborhood. The cape on which the Lanterna stands was at one time a peninsula before the nearby coastline was filled in and reshaped. To the west, it marked the entrance to the original port of Genoa, today the Porto Antico. Over time, the hill on the cape assumed the name "Capo di Faro", or "Lighthouse Cape"; it is also sometimes referred to as the cape of San Benigno, after the convent that once stood there. Today, the hill is gone save for a small rise upon which the lighthouse stands; the rest of it was removed to provide infill for other areas of the city.

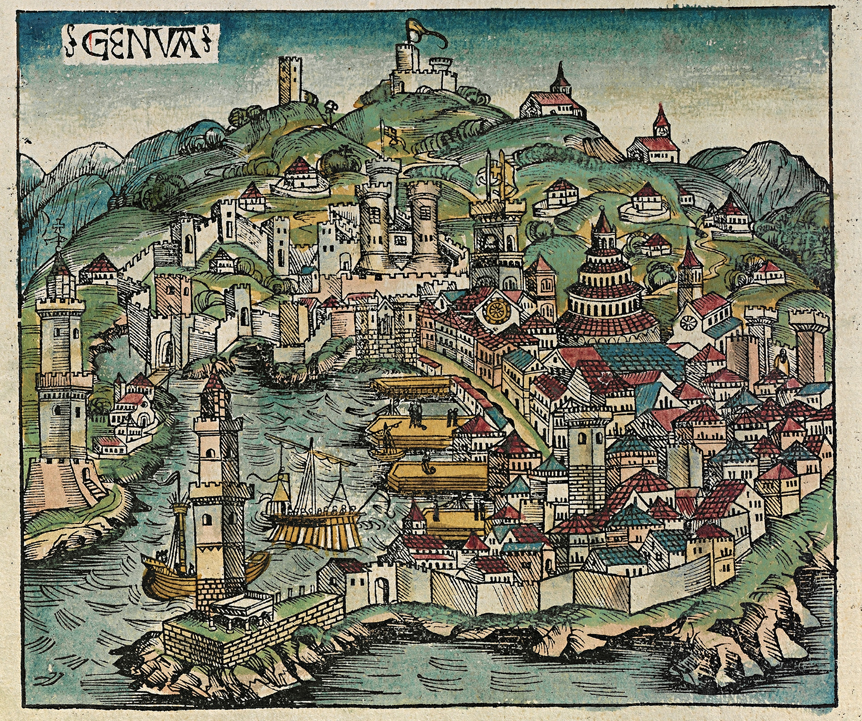
The city of Genoa in a woodcut from the Nuremberg Chronicle, 1493; the Lanterna can be seen in the left edge of the picture.

=== Medieval light ===
The first tower at this location, a structure formed of three crenellated towers, was built, most sources say, around 1128, although at least one states that it was built in 1161. At the time it sat close to the main coastal road, called the Via di Francia, which more recent documents describe as passing between it and the sea. When it was constructed the tower was fairly far from the city; it was only in the seventeenth century that it became part of the so-called "Cerchia Seicentesca", part of the seicento, the walls of Genoa. It has remained a part of the system until today.

Dried pieces of erica and juniper wood were used to fuel the signal fire in its early years; for upkeep, navigators who used the port were expected to pay a tax upon their approach to the city. The tower also played a part, early in its career, in the ongoing feud between the Guelphs and Ghibellines; during one battle, the Ghibellines damaged it considerably during an attempt to dislodge a group of Guelphs who had taken refuge inside. In 1318 and again in 1321, it was decided to dig a defensive trench around the tower, the better to protect it from damage in battle. In 1326 the first oil-based lantern, whose fire was fed by olive oil, was added to the structure, so that incoming vessels could better distinguish the signal fire upon approach. For the same reason, in 1340 the tower was painted with the coat of arms of the city, the better to serve as a distinctive daymark. In around 1400 the lighthouse was further converted for use as a prison; among the hostages therein accommodated were the king of Cyprus, James II, and his wife.

In 1405 the priests who were responsible for the upkeep of the lighthouse placed on its cupola a fish and a golden cross to serve as symbols of Christianity.

In 1449 one of the keepers of the lighthouse was listed as Antonio Colombo, uncle of explorer Christopher Columbus.

=== The reconstruction of 1543 ===
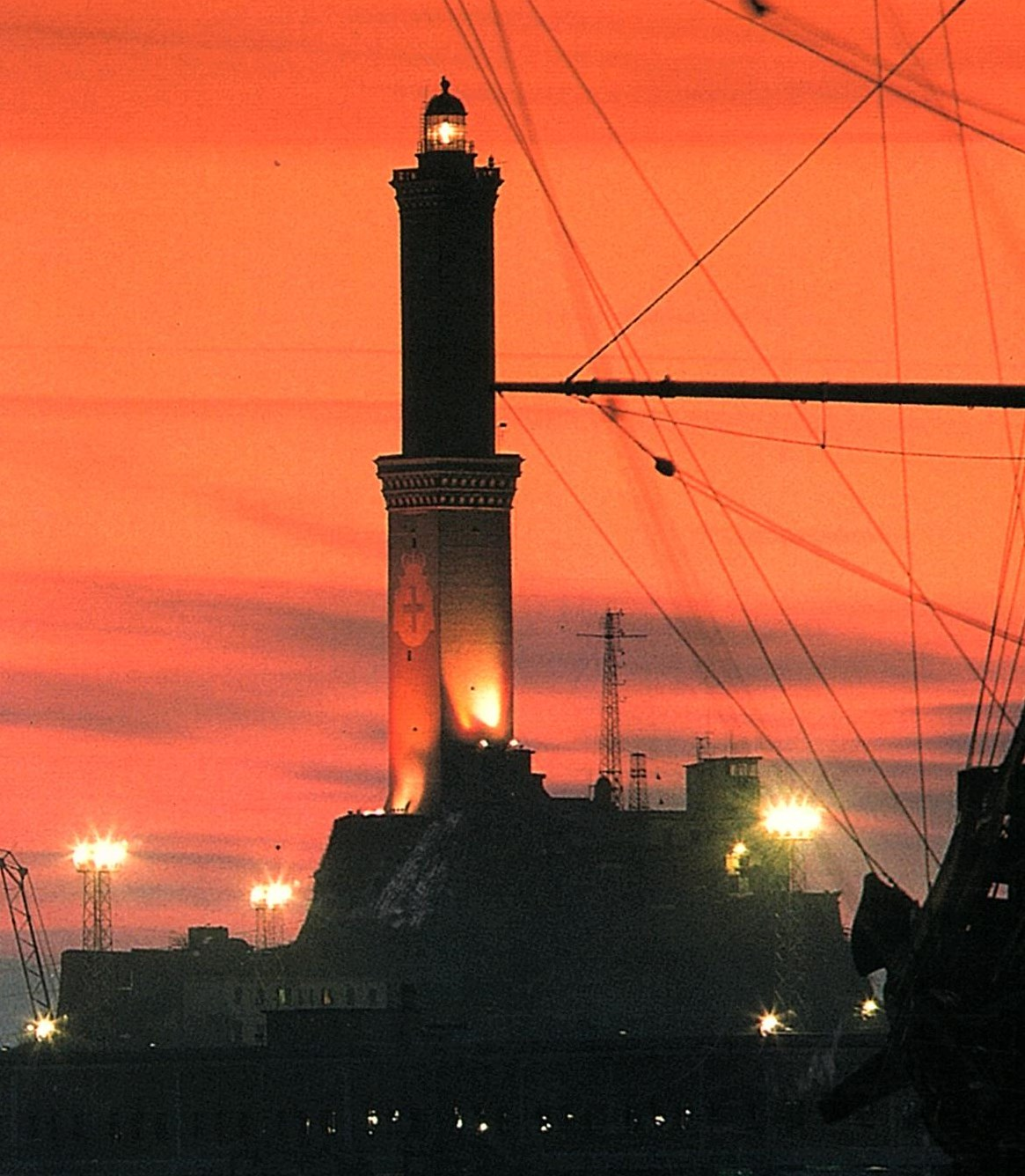
The Lanterna of Genoa

In 1528, when Genoa was under French military occupation, the Genoese admiral Andrea Doria attacked the harbor with thirteen galeas, regaining control of the city. During these events, the Lanterna was badly damaged by friendly fire. The lighthouse tower was reconstructed in the current Renaissance style by the Doge Andrea Centurione Pietrasanta in 1543, with the financial support from the Bank of Saint George.

=== Modern history ===
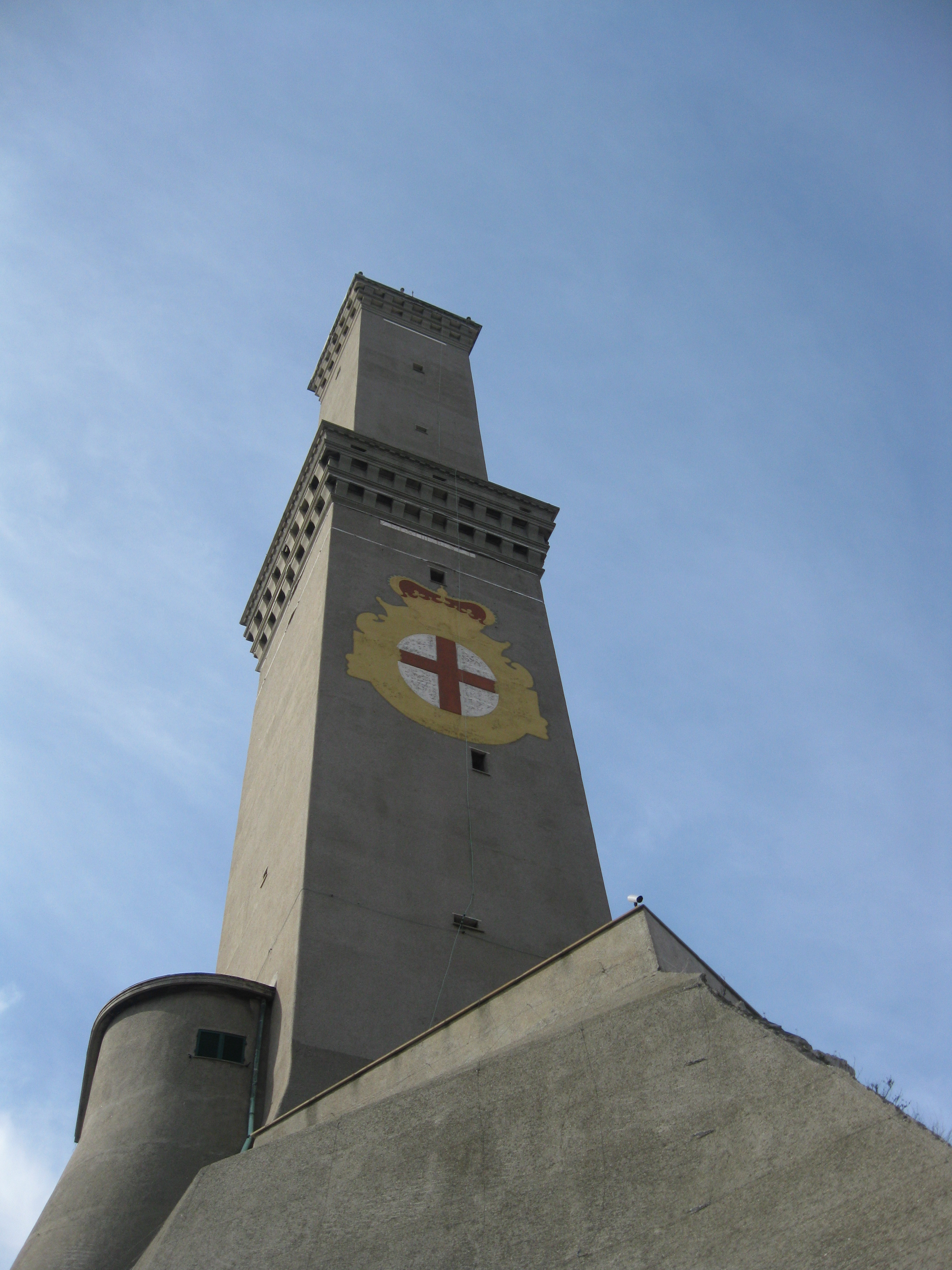
The Lanterna of Genoa

The tower was shelled during the bombardment of Genoa by the French in 1684; the windows which were damaged were replaced on the orders of Louis XIV in 1692. In 1778 construction began on a new lighting system designed to counteract damage done to the lighting apparatus over several centuries of use. In 1840 a rotating Fresnel lens was installed; the system was formally inaugurated in January 1841. It was modified up until the end of the century to increase its capability; the entire lighthouse was modernised again in 1913, but the electrification was poorly done, and had to be refitted in 1936. One last major restoration project, begun after American and British air attacks of World War II, was completed in 1956. It is also the symbol surrounding the Derby della Lanterna between two football clubs, Genoa C.F.C. and U.C. Sampdoria.

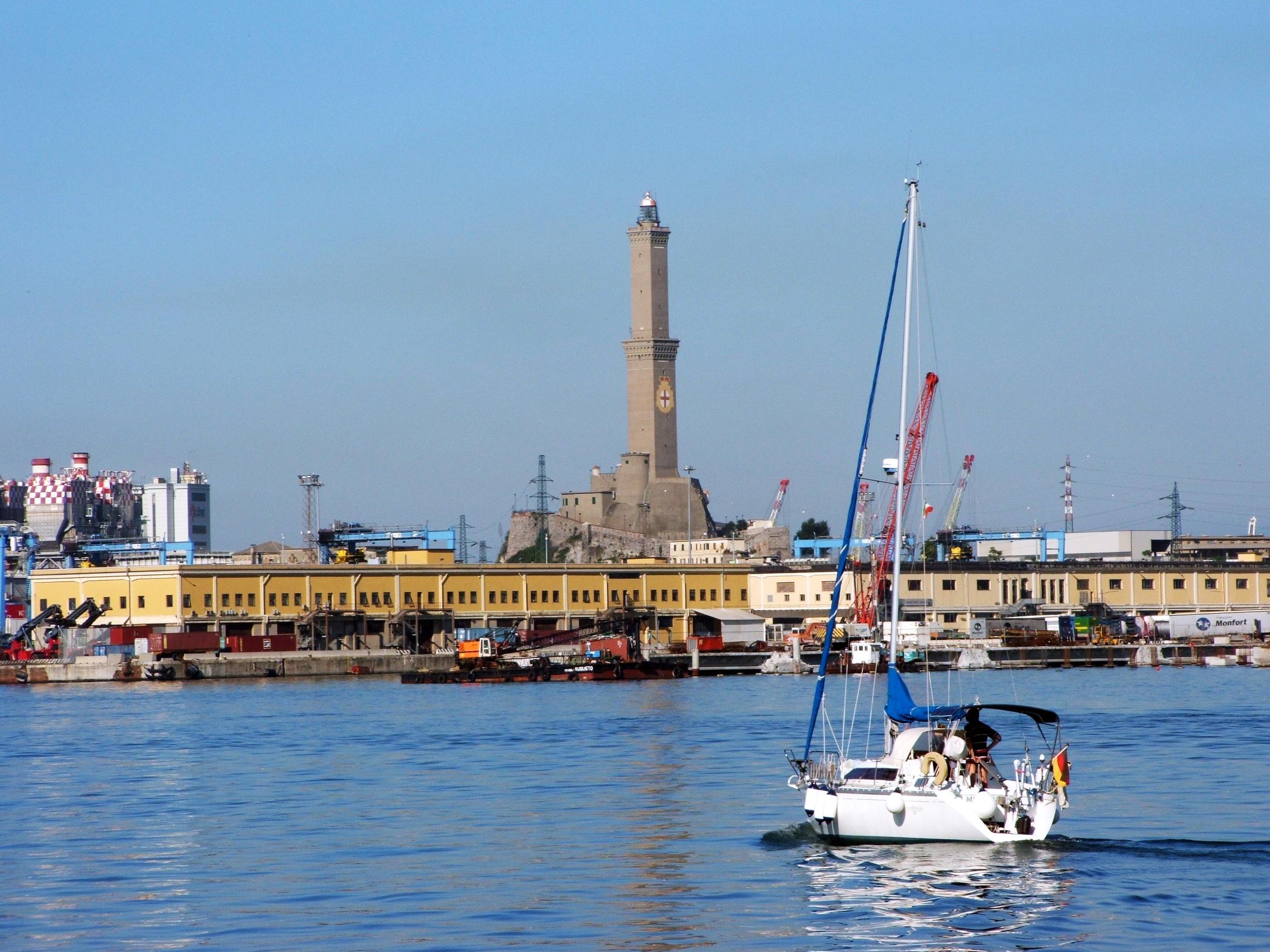
Panorama of the port with the Lanterna.

== Lanterna Museum ==
Adjacent to the tower is the Museo della Lanterna, which may be reached by a walk from the old city walls to the foot of the beacon at the via Milano. It is also accessible from the neighboring Genova-Ovest highway. Work on the facility was completed in 2004, and the museum was opened to the public in 2006; at the same time a new entry door was installed in the lighthouse. Further restoration involved replacement of some decorative elements on the attic of the tower and systematic paving, in stone, of the accessway. The city park to the north has also been rehabilitated.

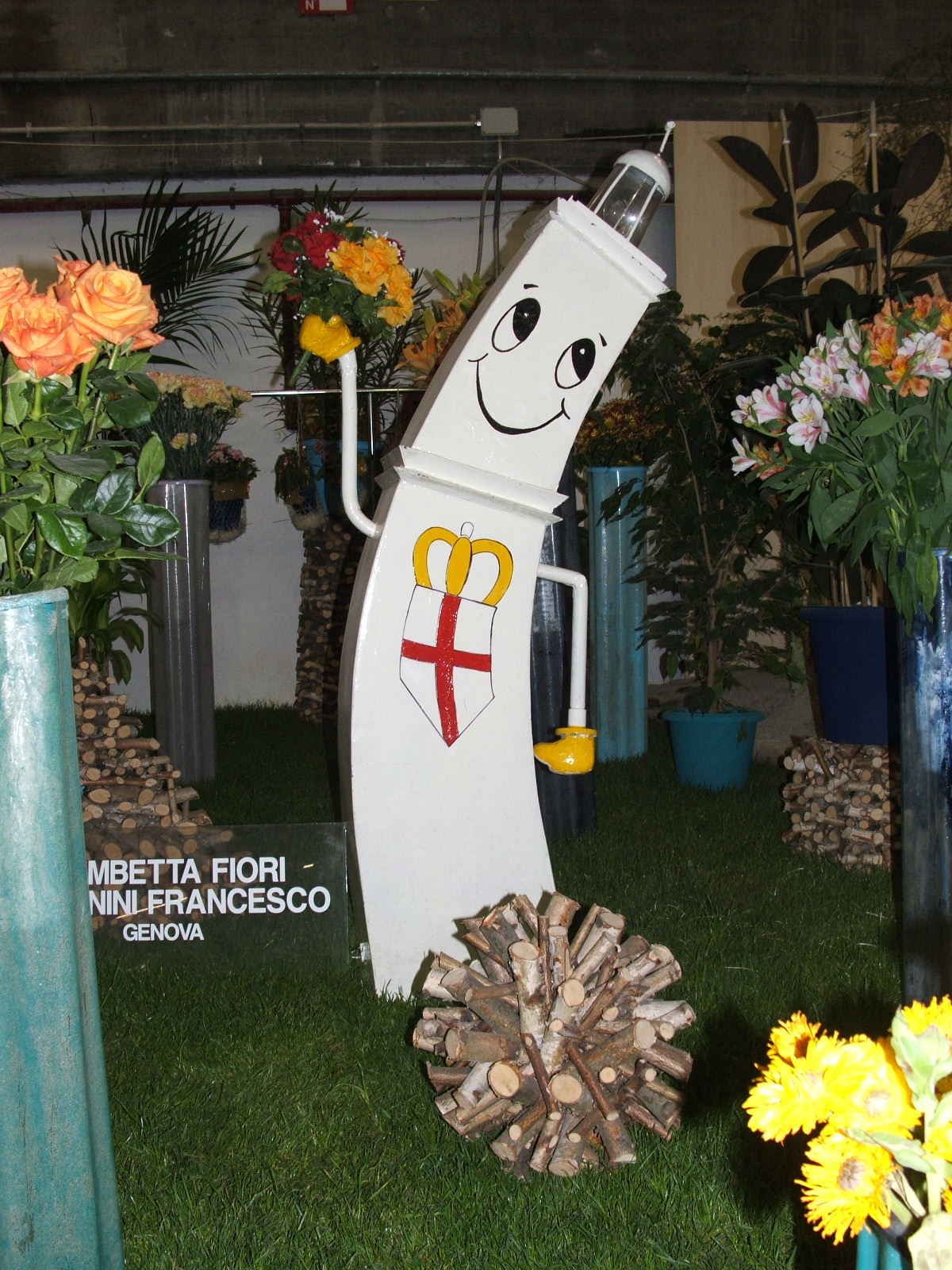
Stylized Lanterna at Euroflora 2006

The museum mainly covers the history of the city and the port, and contains a good deal of archival material. Some of the displays also cover the history of navigation and navigational aids in Genoa, and describe various signaling systems that have been used at sea. Part of a Fresnel lens, similar to that found in the lighthouse itself, is shown in such a manner as to display its inner workings. In addition to the permanent displays, temporary exhibits are also sometimes shown at the museum.

The tower has been struck by lightning several times in its career. The most serious occasion, in 1481, led to the death of one of its guardians. In 1602 lightning demolished a part of the crenellation on the top tower, and in 1603 another strike, again on the same tower, hit a decorative marble tablet with the text Jesus Christus rex venit in pace et Deus Homo factus est(Jesus Christ king came in peace, and God became Man). This tablet may still be seen today; it is mounted on the ground at the base of the top tower.

At one time the lighthouse worked in tandem with a smaller tower, posted at the other end of the harbor where the cotton warehouses in the Porto Antico now stand.

== Management ==
Management of the tower is under the authority of the Lighthouse Command Zone of the Marina Militare, and is directed from its center in La Spezia, which oversees all of the lighthouses in the region. The Marina Militare has been responsible for all lights on the Italian coast since 1910, and employs both military and civil technicians for the purpose.

== Image gallery ==
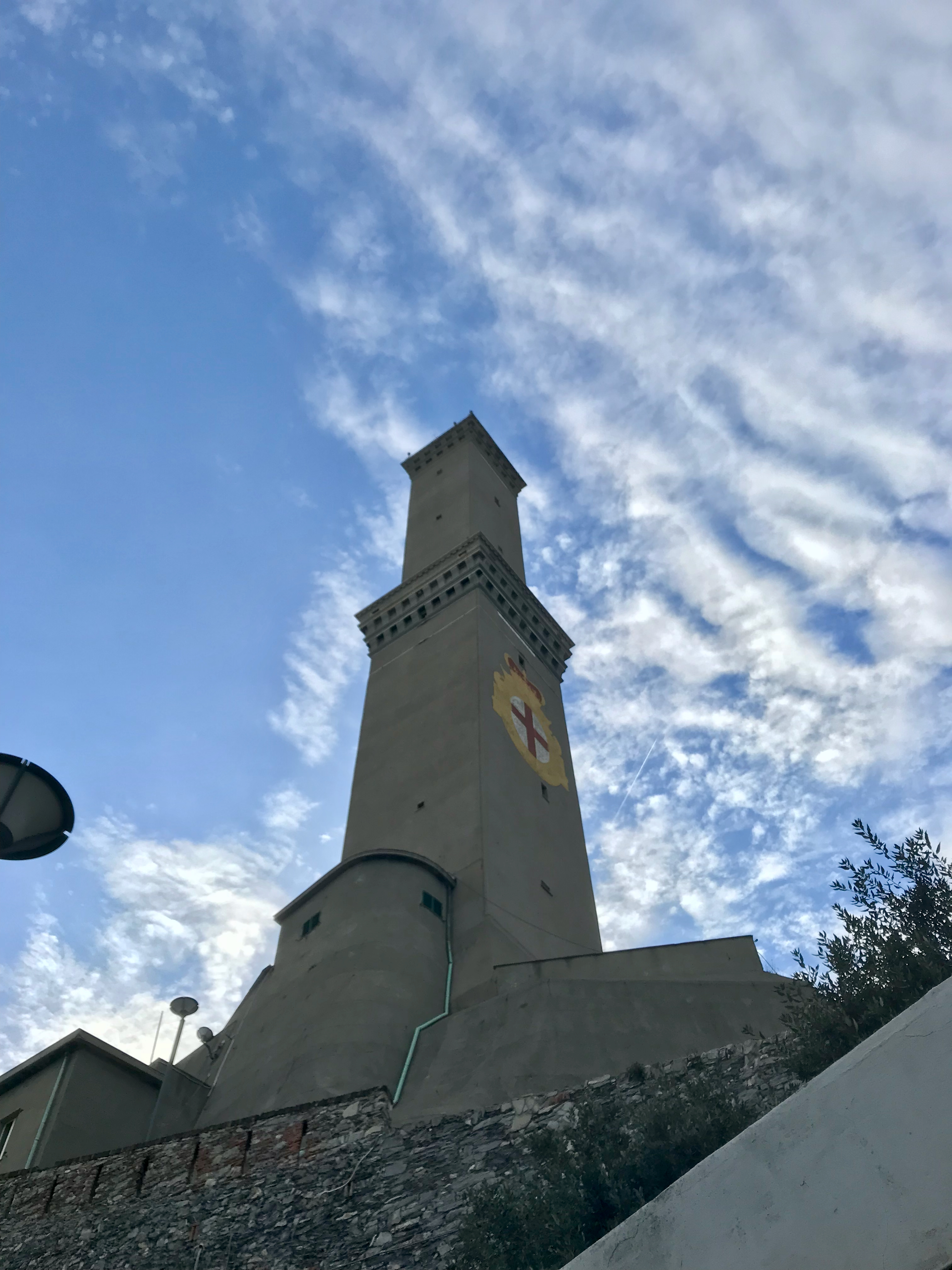
Lanterna photographed from the walkway below

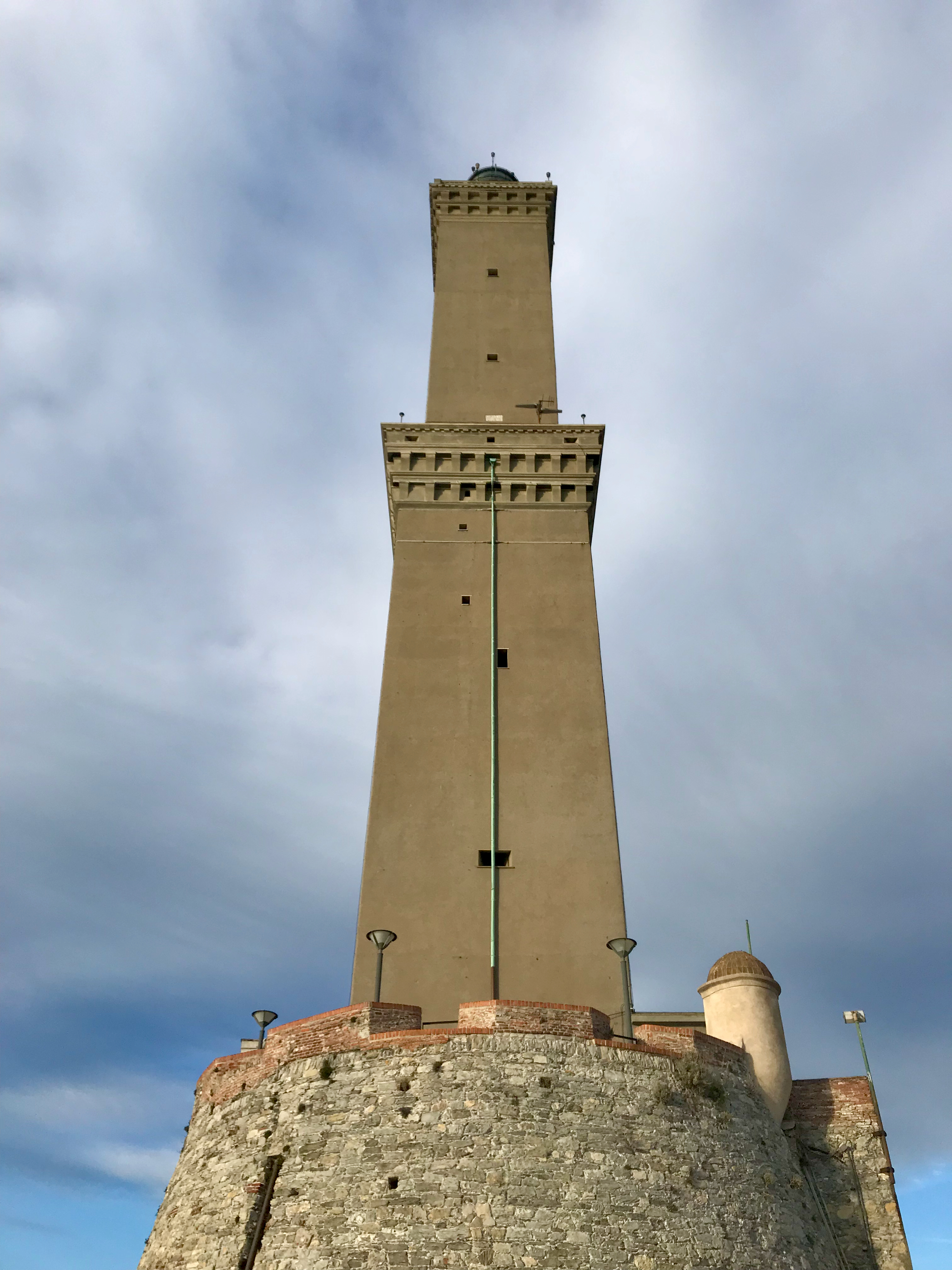
Lanterna photographed from the south side

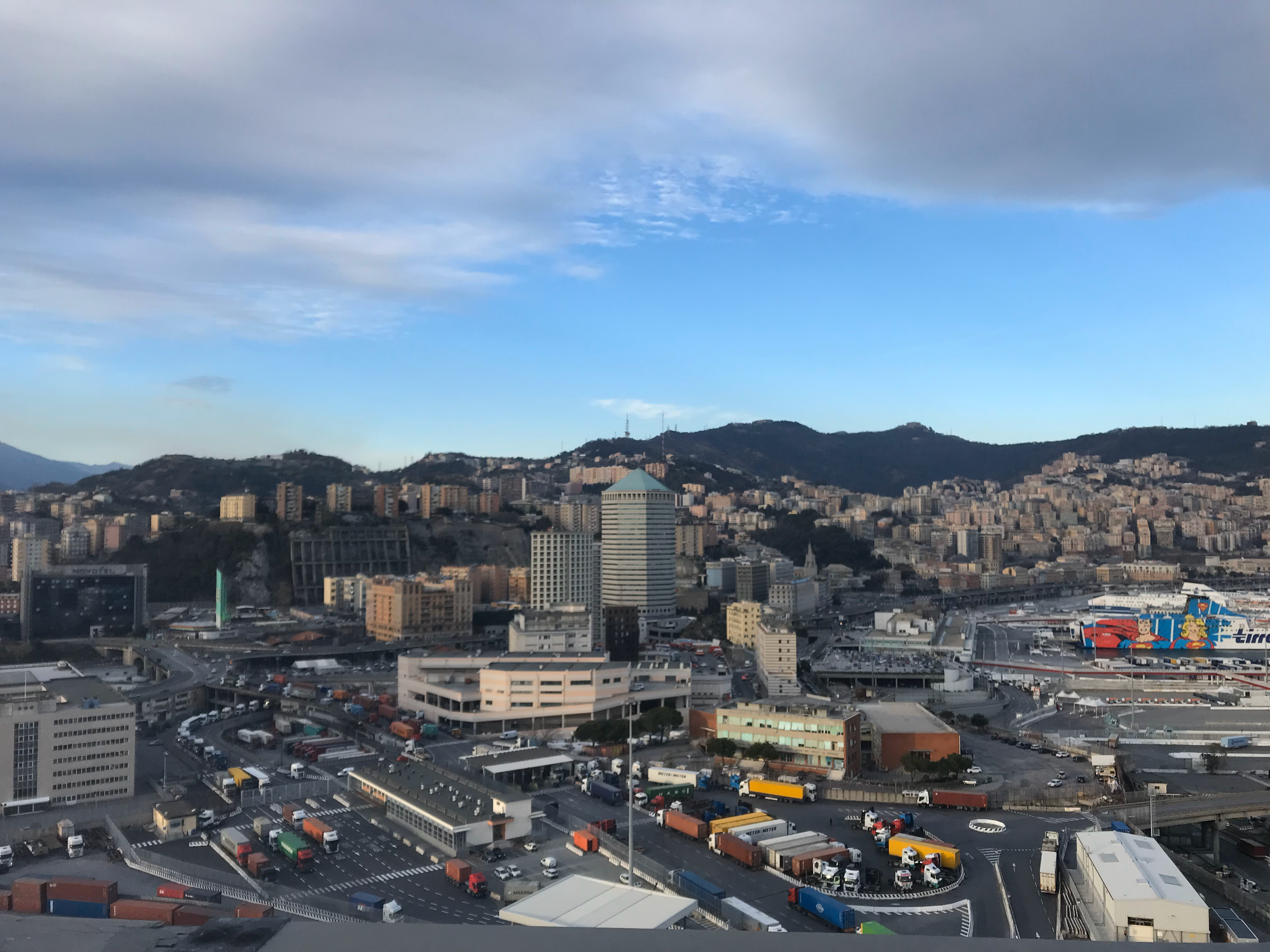
The view from Lanterna towards the north

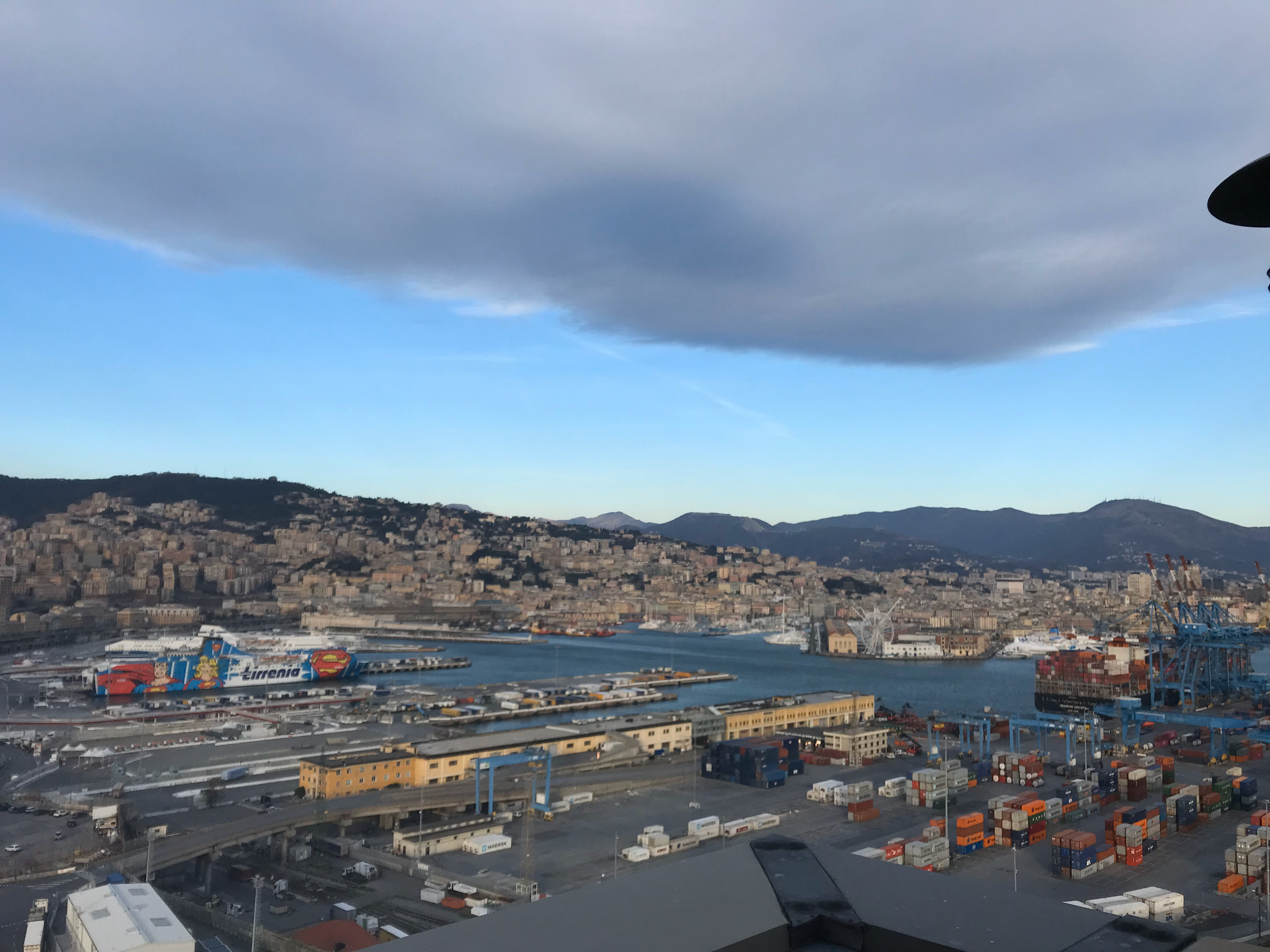
The view from Lanterna towards the northeast

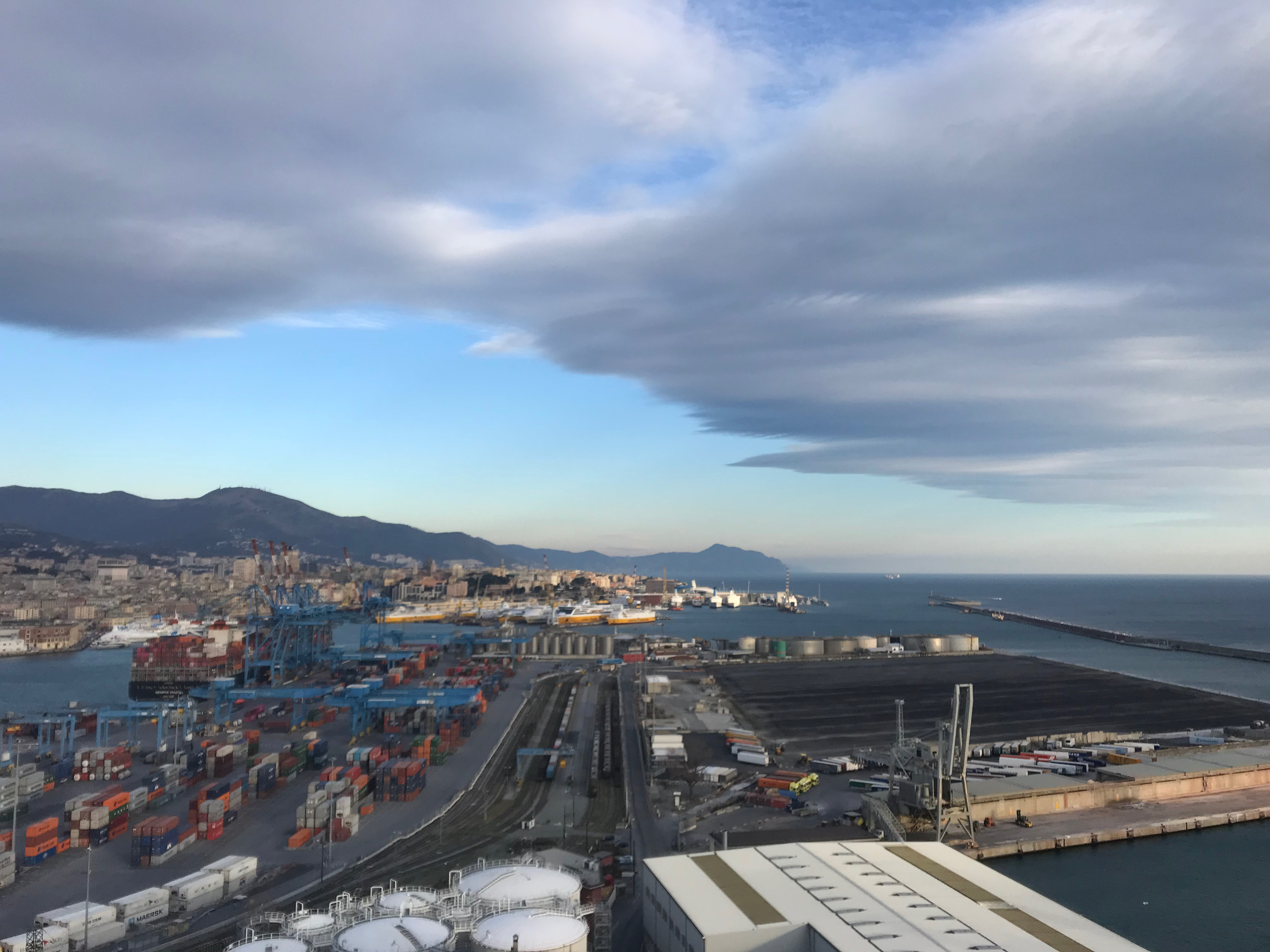
East view from the Genoa Lantern

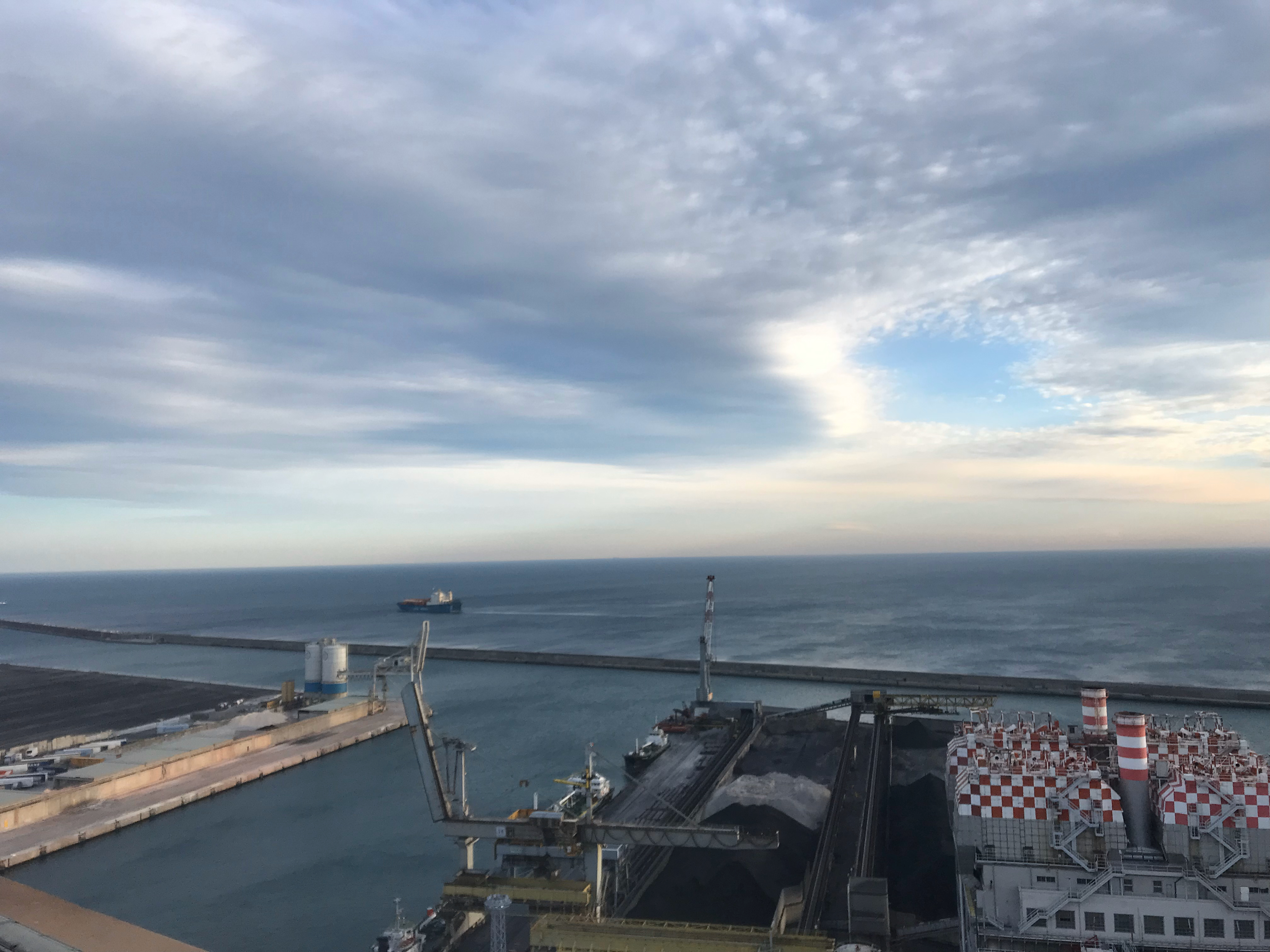
The view from the Lanterna towards the south

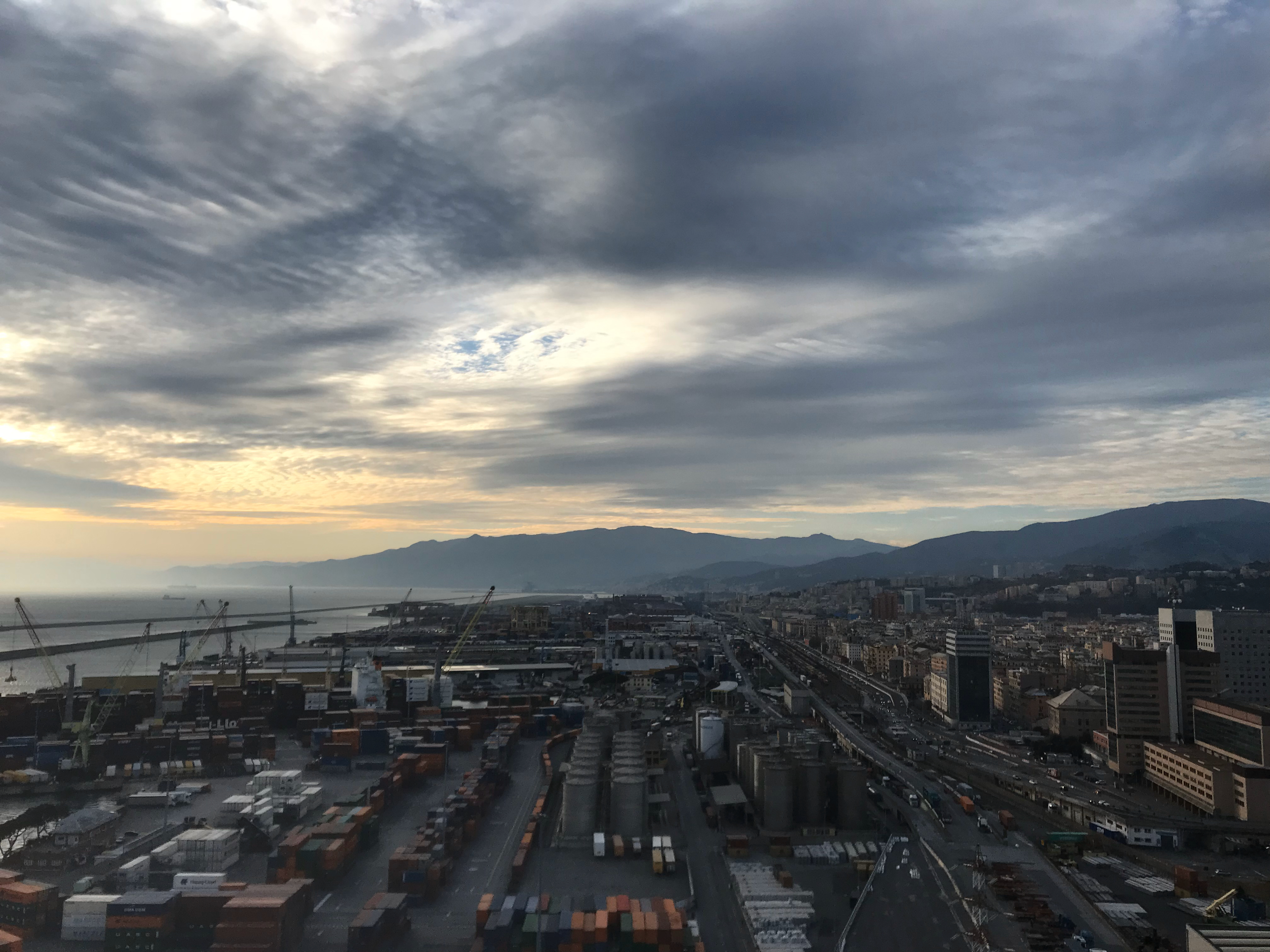
The view from the Lanterna to the west

== See also ==
- List of lighthouses in Italy
- List of tallest lighthouses in the world

== Bibliography ==
- La Lanterna, storie e leggende del Faro più famoso del mondo, Editrice Il Golfo, 2000.
