= Forte Sperone =

Abandoned fortification in Genoa, Italy

- Part of Walls of Genoa
- Genoa, Liguria in Italy
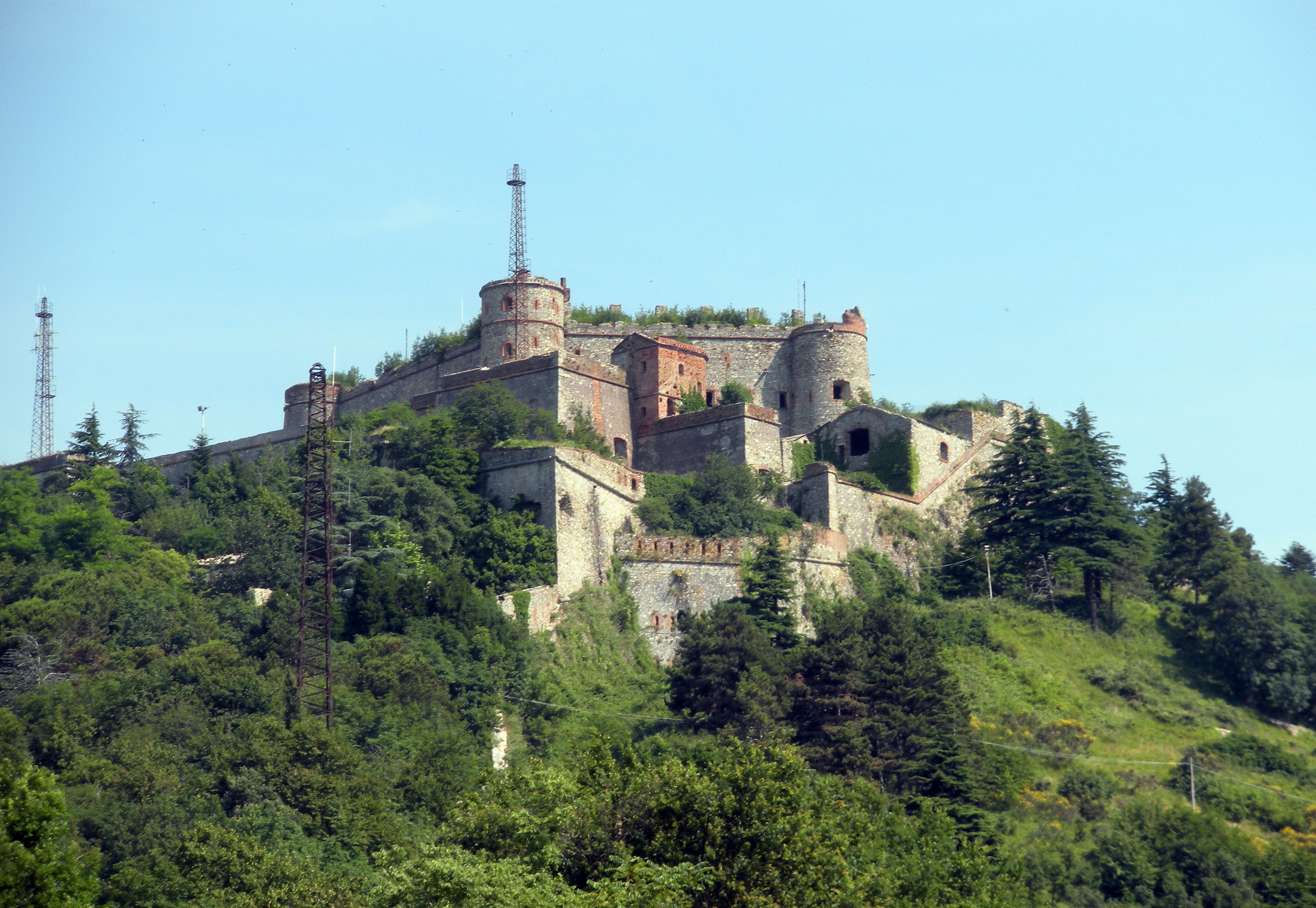
- Forte Sperone, Genoa

Site information
- Owner: Municipality of Genoa
- Open to the public: Yes

Location
- Coordinates: 44°26′26″N 8°55′50″E

Site history
- Built: 14th century
- In use: 1830
- Materials: Stone
- Fate: Abandoned

Forte Sperone is a fortification included in the "New Walls" built to defend the Italian city of Genoa, located on top of Mount Peralto. The union of two walls, one on the side of Val Polcevera and the other on the side of Val Bisagno, gives the fort the appearance of the bow of a ship, from which its name derives. Due to its dominant position, it was one of the most important structures of the fortifications of Genoa.

== Description ==
Forte Sperone has a complex structure, built on three distinct levels. The first level, which holds the main entrance, was designed to house warehouses, service rooms, and cisterns; on the second level were offices and rooms for officers and NCOs, and on the third level were rooms for soldiers. The structure normally sheltered a garrison of about 300 soldiers, which could reach 900 in case of need. The importance of the fort was evidenced by its artillery pieces: 18 cannons of various sizes, nine howitzers, and numerous smaller pieces.

== History ==
The presence of a Ghibelline fortress at the location, built initially of wood and then of stone, called "Bastia del Peralto", has been documented since 1319. In 1530, the Senate of the Republic of Genoa commissioned its reconstruction.

This structure was likely incorporated into the New Walls at the time of their construction (1629-1633). During the Austrian siege of 1747, an elevated structure was erected at the point where the walls joined, to increase the firepower of the bastion. After the end of the war, the construction of the actual fort began: with progressive extensions which lasted until 1830, the structure assumed the aspect that we can still observe today.

In the Napoleonic era, a "closing" curtain wall was designed facing the city, to defend the fort from any popular uprisings. This curtain, in which the monumental entrance portal was inserted, was built after 1815. The entrance portal, surmounted by a Savoy coat of arms in marble, is equipped with a drawbridge, still present with its lifting mechanism to this day.

In 1823, a special commission prepared the plans for a project, never carried out (probably due to the very high cost that it would have entailed), to integrate the three fortifications of Peralto (Castellaccio, Sperone, and Begato) into a single citadel.

During the uprisings of 1849, the fort was occupied for a short time by rioters, who abandoned it as events turned in favour of the royal army.

== Recent history ==
After the decommissioning of the Genoese fortifications, ordered in 1914, Croatian and Serbian prisoners of war were held in the fort during World War I. In 1918, the prison was administered by Francesco Calì, who had been a footballer and first captain of the Italian national football team.

From 1958 to 1981, the fort was used as a barracks for the Guardia di Finanza, and subsequently taken over by the Municipality of Genoa, which organized cultural events there in the summer.

== Image gallery ==
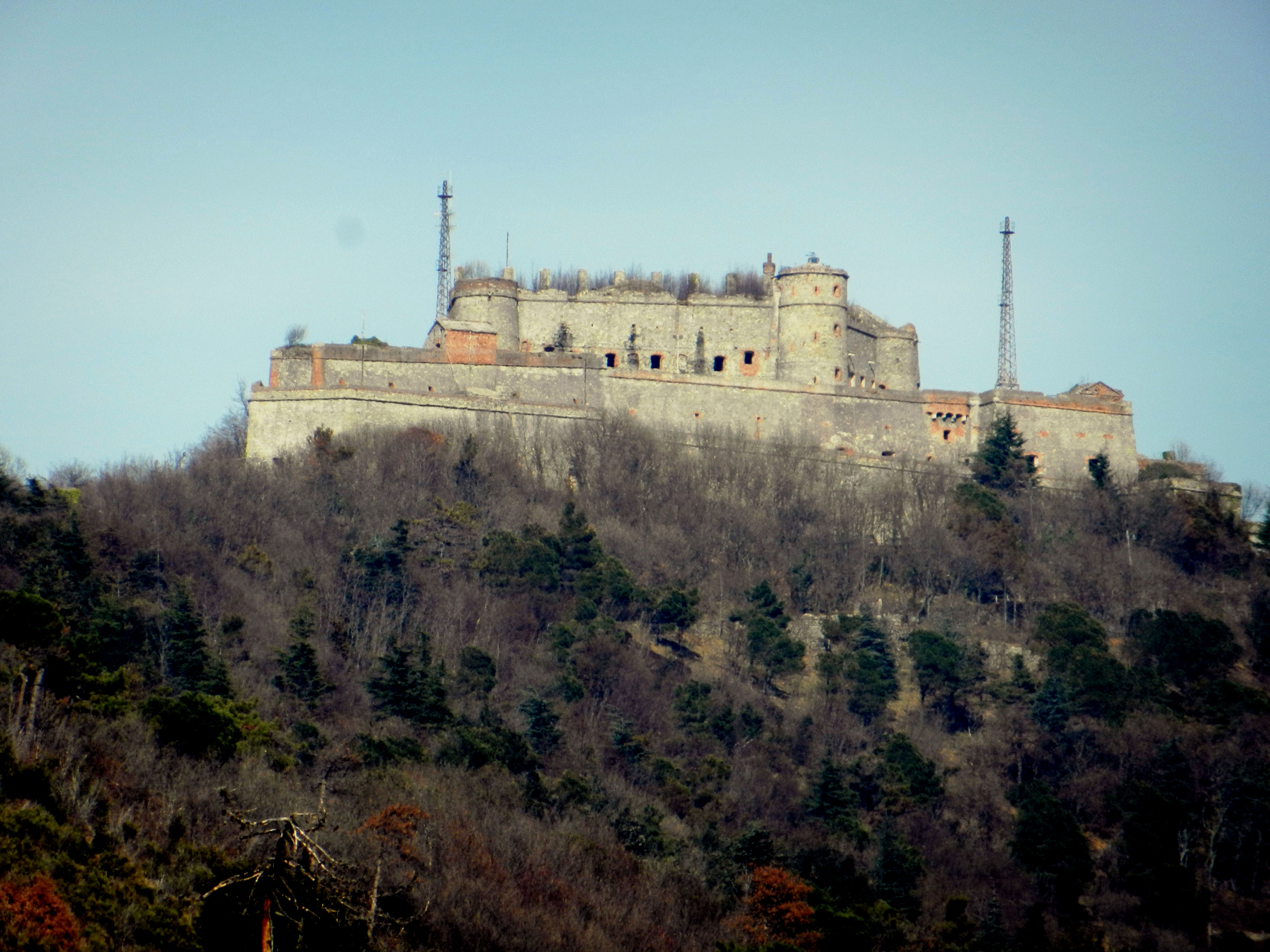
Forte Sperone seen from Begato walls (2012)

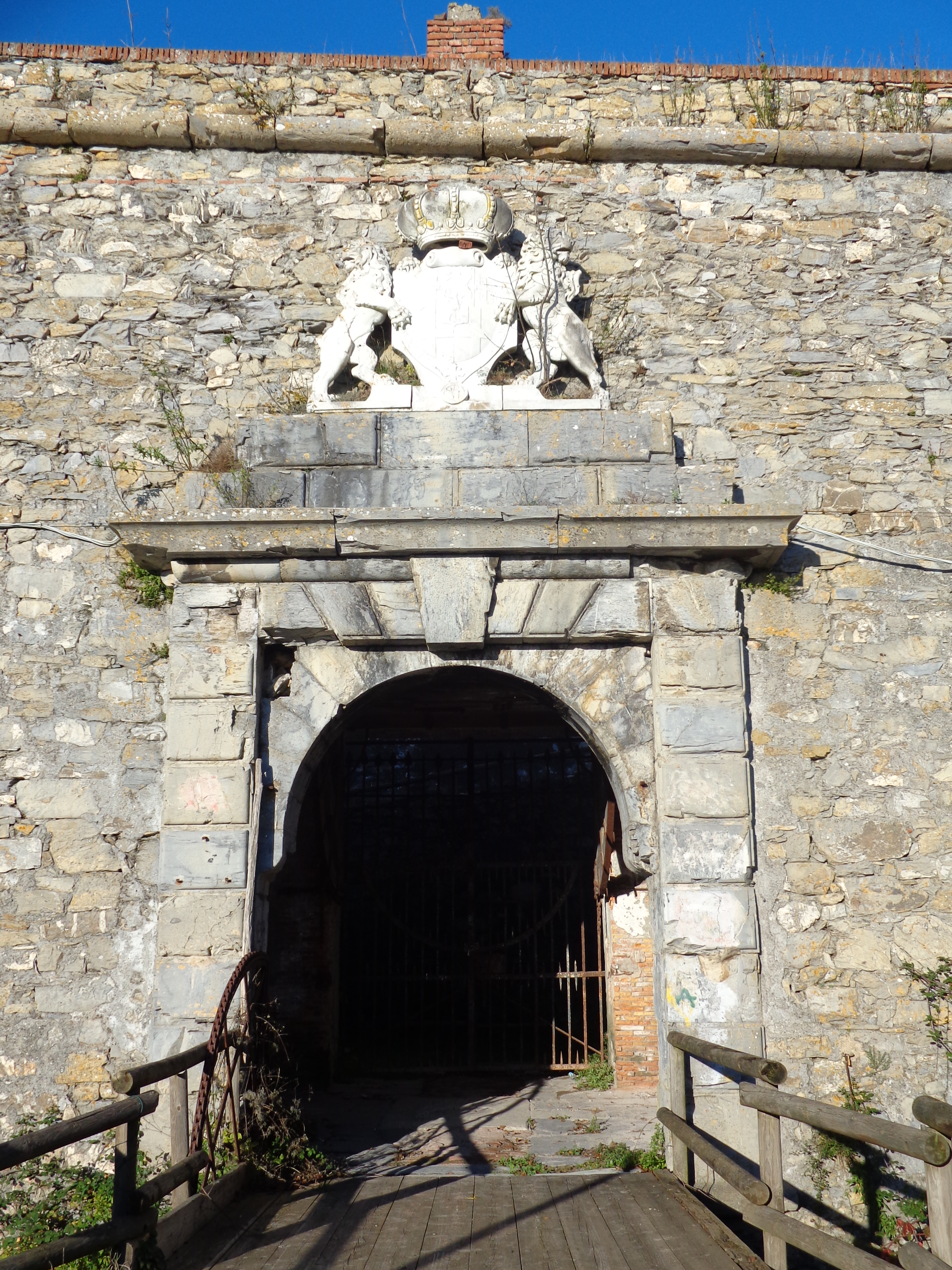
Main entrance to the fort (2013)

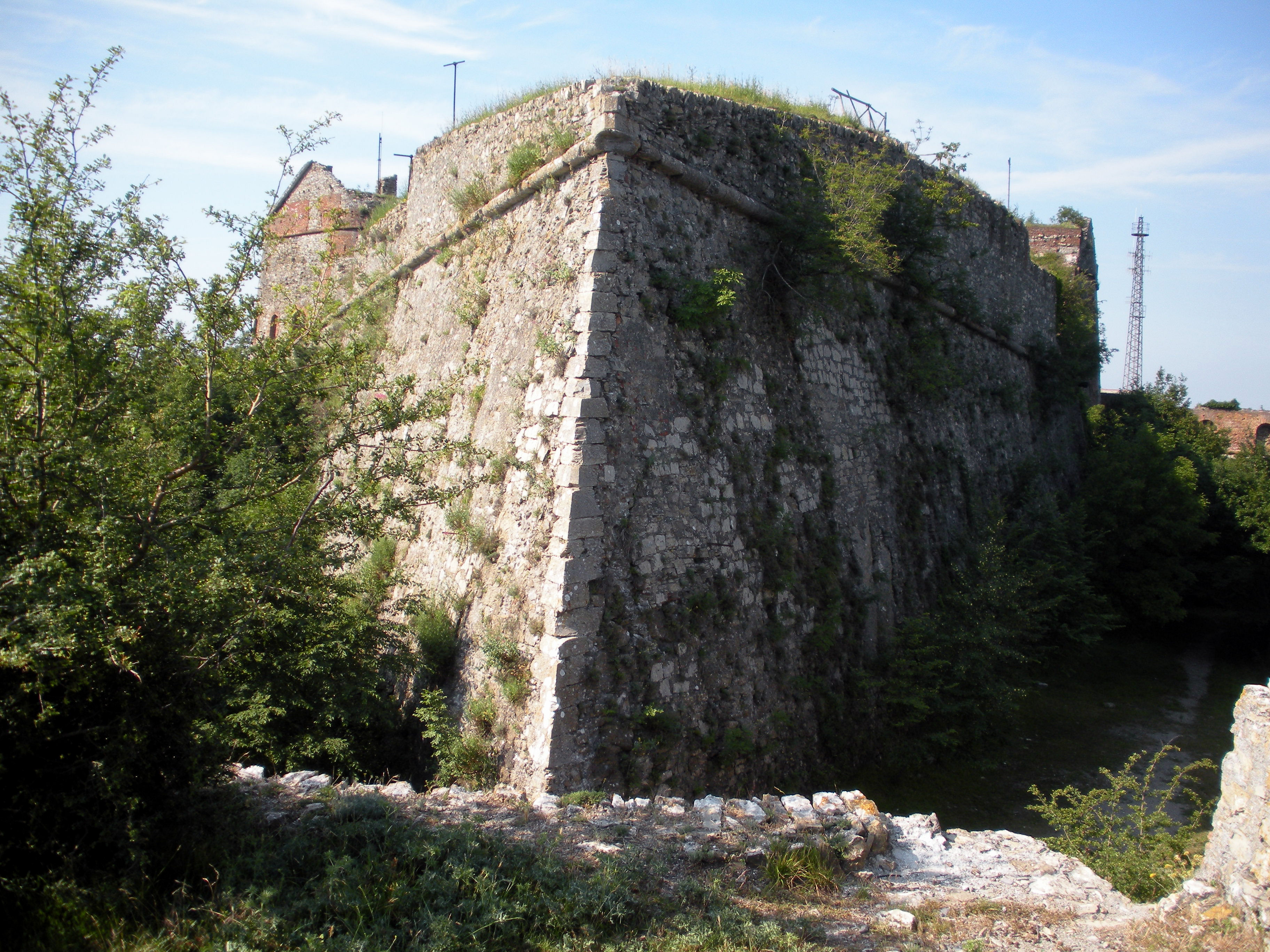
The abutment that gives the name to the fortress (2010)

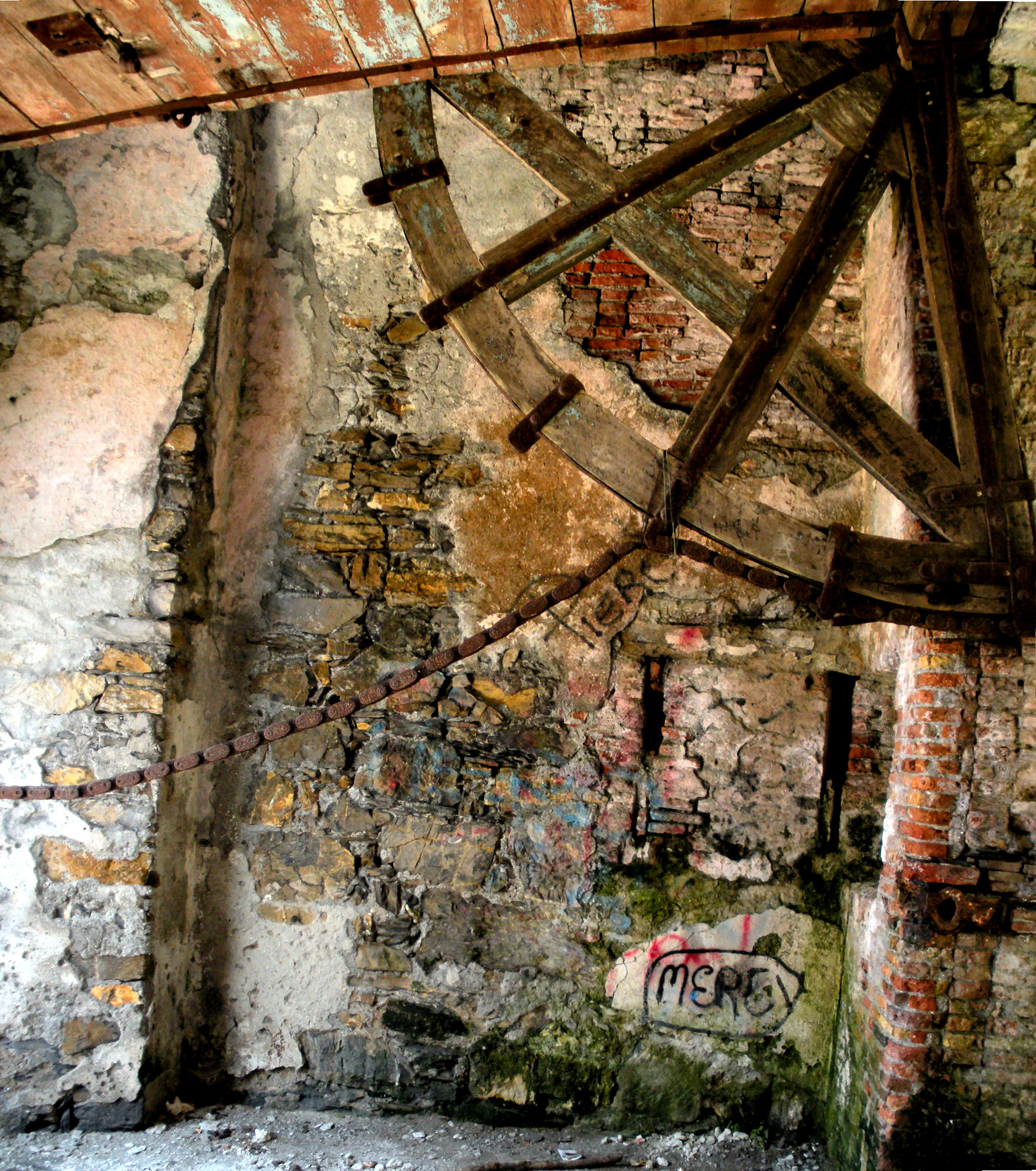
Drawbridge lifting mechanism (2010)
