= Walls of Genoa =

Series of walls surrounding the city of Genoa, Italy

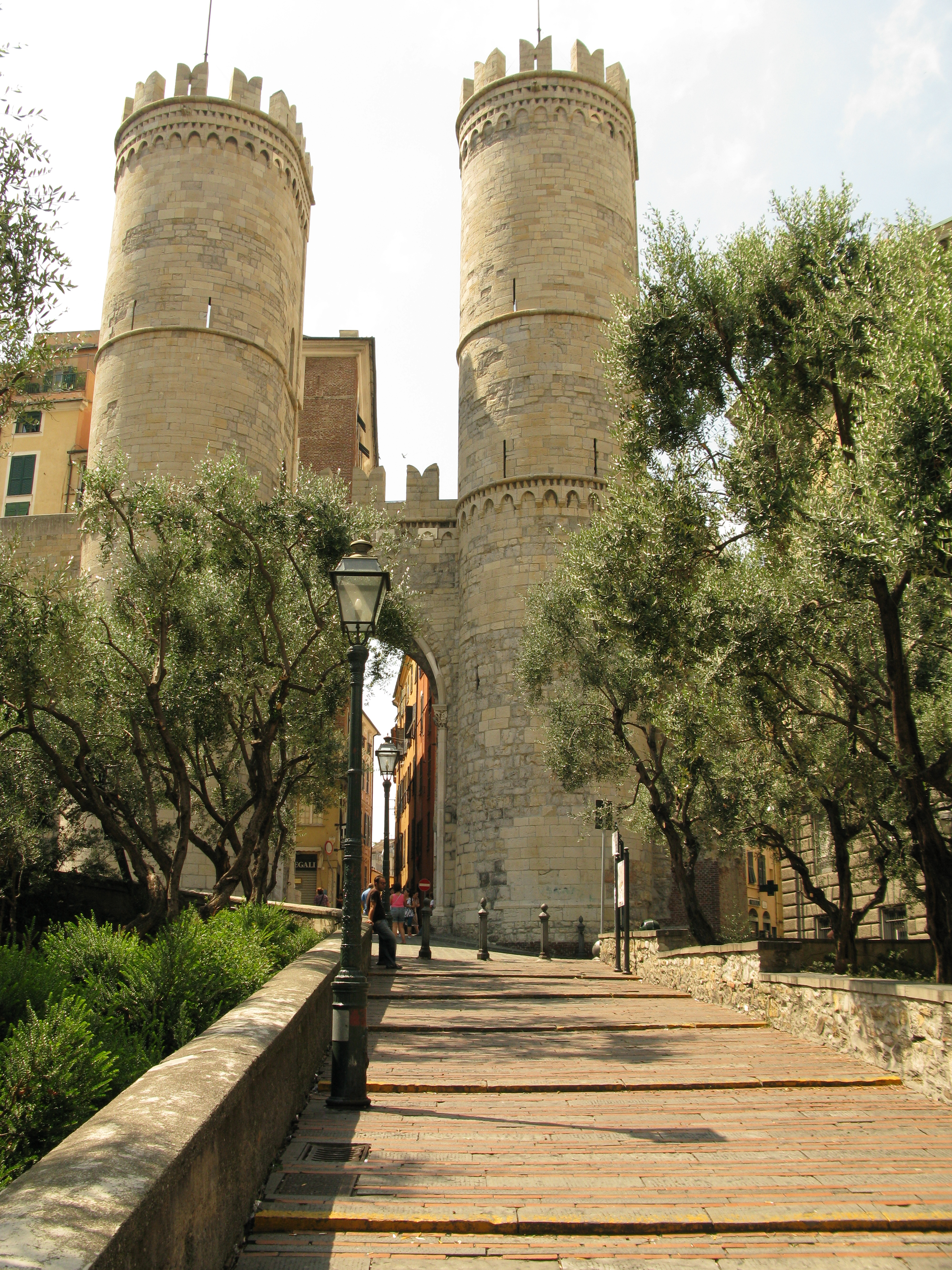
Porta Soprana is the best-known gate of the ancient walls of Genoa. After major restorations carried out between the 19th and 20th centuries, it has regained the appearance it supposedly had at the time of the construction of the so-called Barbarossa walls (1150 ca.).

The walls of Genoa (mura di Genova in Italian, miage de Zena in Ligurian) constitute in their whole the several circles of walls that protected and defended the city of Genoa, former capital of the republic of the same name. To this day, large portions of these walls remain, and Genoa has more and longer walls than any other city in Italy.

== Ancient walls ==
=== Ancient era and Middle Ages ===
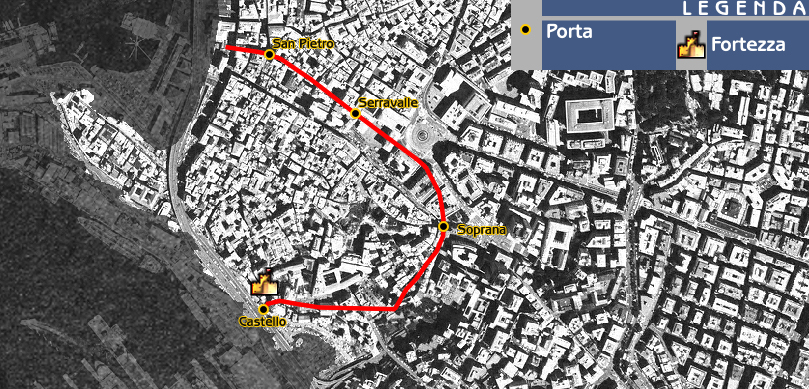
Map of the city walls at the end of 10th century

In Roman times the original centre of Genoa, on the Sarzano hill, may have been defended by a wall, but there is no archaeological or documentary evidence of its existence.

The first known city walls were built in the 9th century, when thanks to Berengar II of Italy, the city gained wide autonomy, with subsequent economic development and a population increase. The first walls, which included Sarzano hill, had three gates: the Serravalle gate, at the north side of the church of San Lorenzo, another on the hill of Saint Andrew, near the site of the future Porta Soprana, and another one at the end of “Via Canneto il curto”, near the church of San Peter.

The settlement enclosed by the walls and the coastline occupied about twenty-two hectares. Some small settlements (housing mainly workmen and artisans), which had grown around churches, monasteries, and feudal palaces, remained outside the walls.

=== Barbarossa walls ===
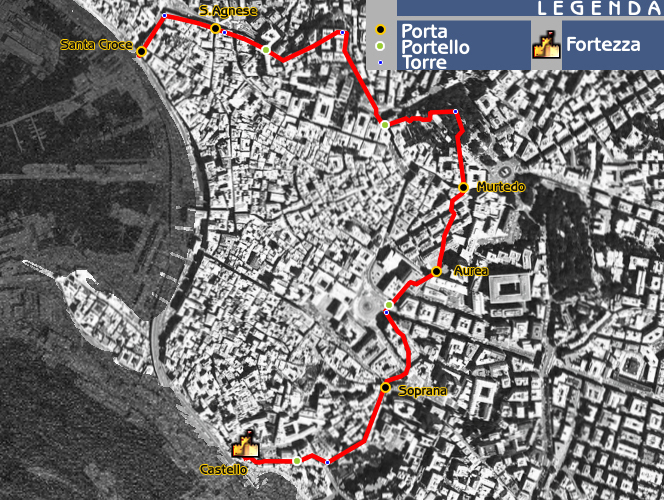
Map of the “Barbarossa walls”

In 1155, this defensive wall was extended to the northwest to include the new settlements outside the walls. The walls culminated on the top of St. Andrew hill, with Porta Soprana.

The new walls greatly expanded the area contained within, compared to the previous one, including an area of 55 hectares.

The construction of the walls dragged until 1163; in that year, the international political situation and particularly relations with emperor Frederick Barbarossa led to an acceleration of work, as attested to by Caffaro, and the work was completed in 53 days thanks to the effort of the entire population.

The three main gates had a monumental look, with high semicircular towers. Two of them survive to this day: “Porta Soprana” and “Porta dei Vacca”; the third one, Porta Aurea ("Golden Gate"), already partially demolished in the 18th century, was completely demolished in the second half of the 20th century. In the 13th century, the Old Pier peninsula, at the southern limit of the port, was also included inside the walls, thus completing the fortifications on the sea side of the city.

=== The 14th century expansion ===
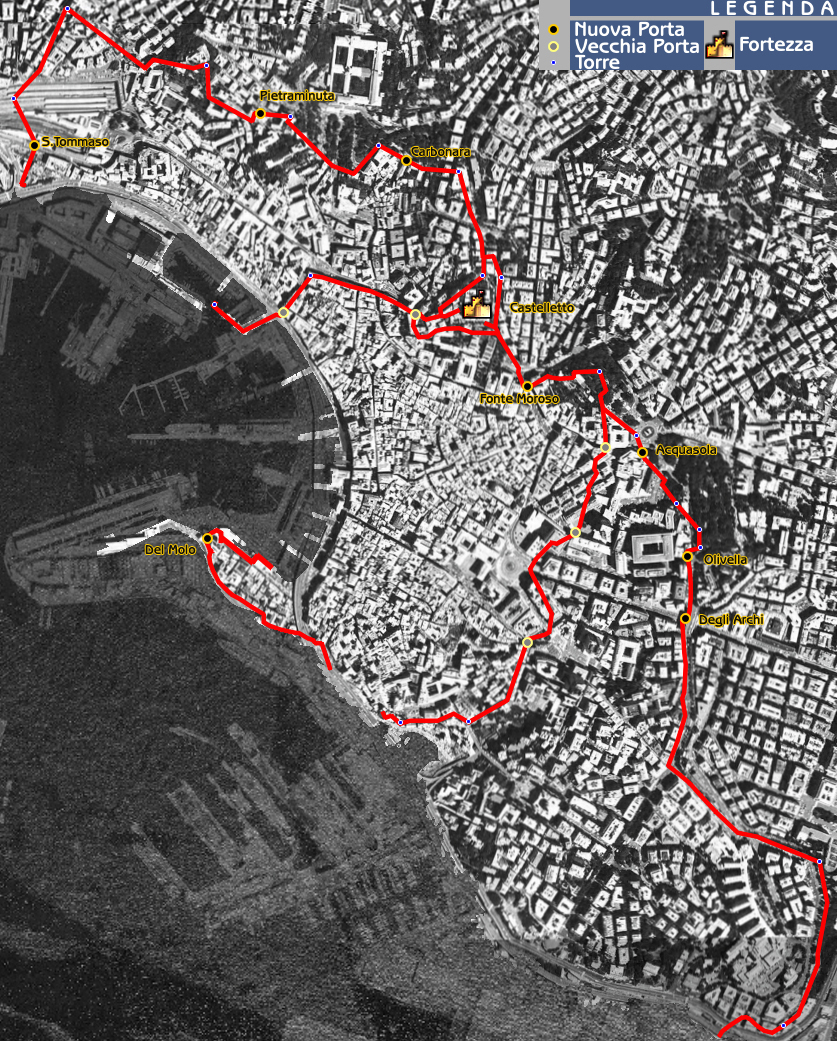
Map of the city walls in the 14th century

In the 14th century, urban expansion of the city, caused by the increase in commercial activity, led to a new extension of walls to encompass the new quarters which stood to the west and east of the original city centre.

Between 1320 and 1327, the east side of the walls was extended to include Carignano Hill, passing where now are the esplanade of Acquasola and the Monumental Bridge. This wall section had two gates: Porta dell'Acquasola and Porta degli Archi. Hence, the ancient walls, still visible, continue with the names of Mura of Santa Chiara, Mura del Prato, and Mura delle Cappuccine, ending with a cliff overlooking the sea.

From 1347 and 1350, another extension was built toward the west, from the fort of Castelletto to the new St. Thomas Gate, near the present Principe railway station. This stretch of walls included a series of towers and gates which no longer exist (Carbonara, Pietraminuta, St. George, the above-mentioned St. Thomas Gate, and another tower in the place where today stands Castello d'Albertis). After this enlargement, the city wall ran for 4,550 meters, containing an area of 155 hectares.

=== The walls in the 16th century ===
In the 16th century, the walls were no longer able to withstand an attack by modern firearms, so they were modified to create new Star forts.

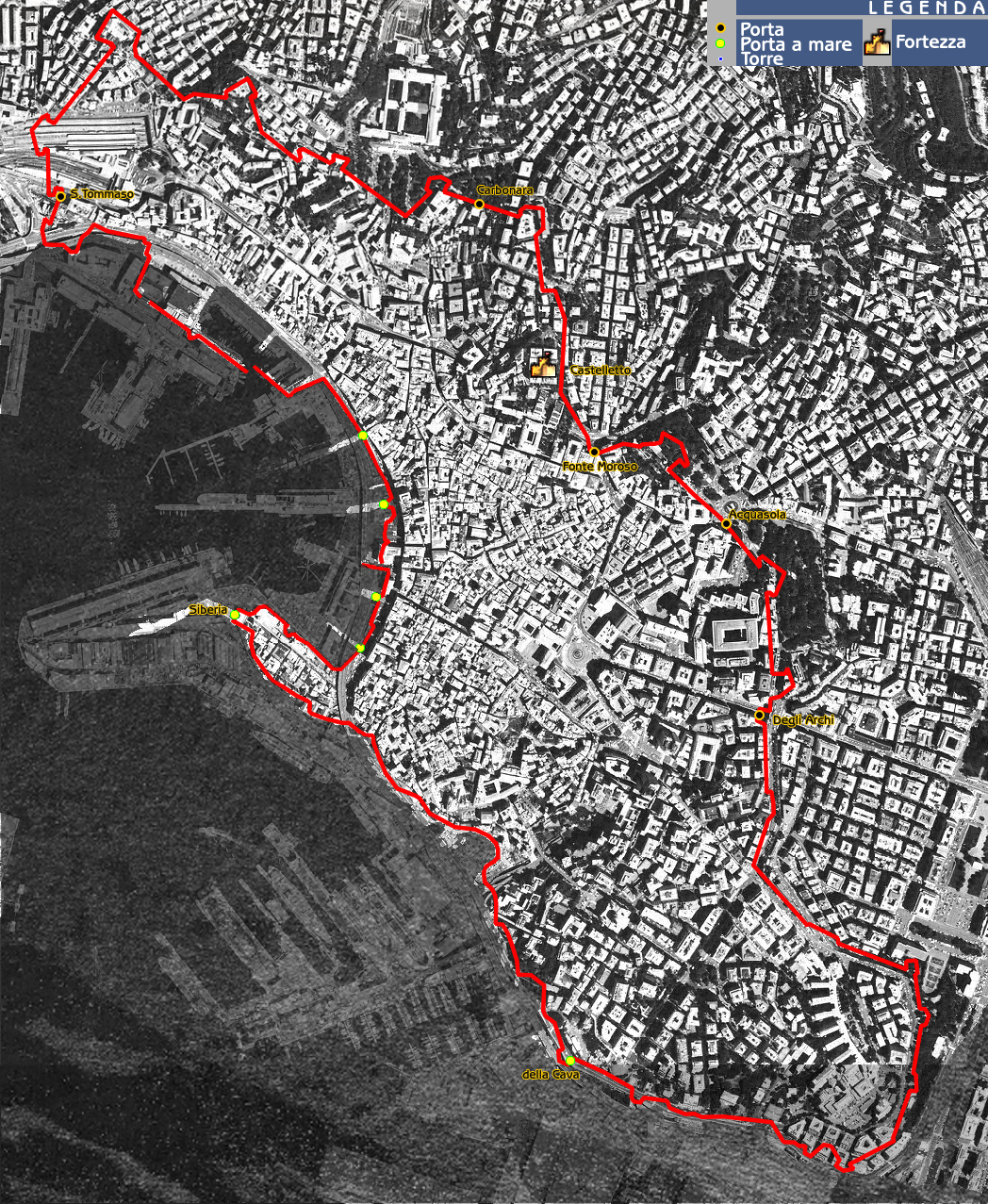
Map of the 16th-century walls with the new curtains and gates along the port area

In 1528, Andrea Doria placed the Republic of Genoa under the protection of the Spaniards. Fearing the possibility of new attacks by the French army, he promoted the modernization of the city walls, projected by Giovanni Maria Olgiati and carried out in the third decade of the 16th century. The “Barbarossa walls” and their 14th-century extensions were modernized by replacing the old square towers with triangular bastions and building new curtains with a counterscarp profile.

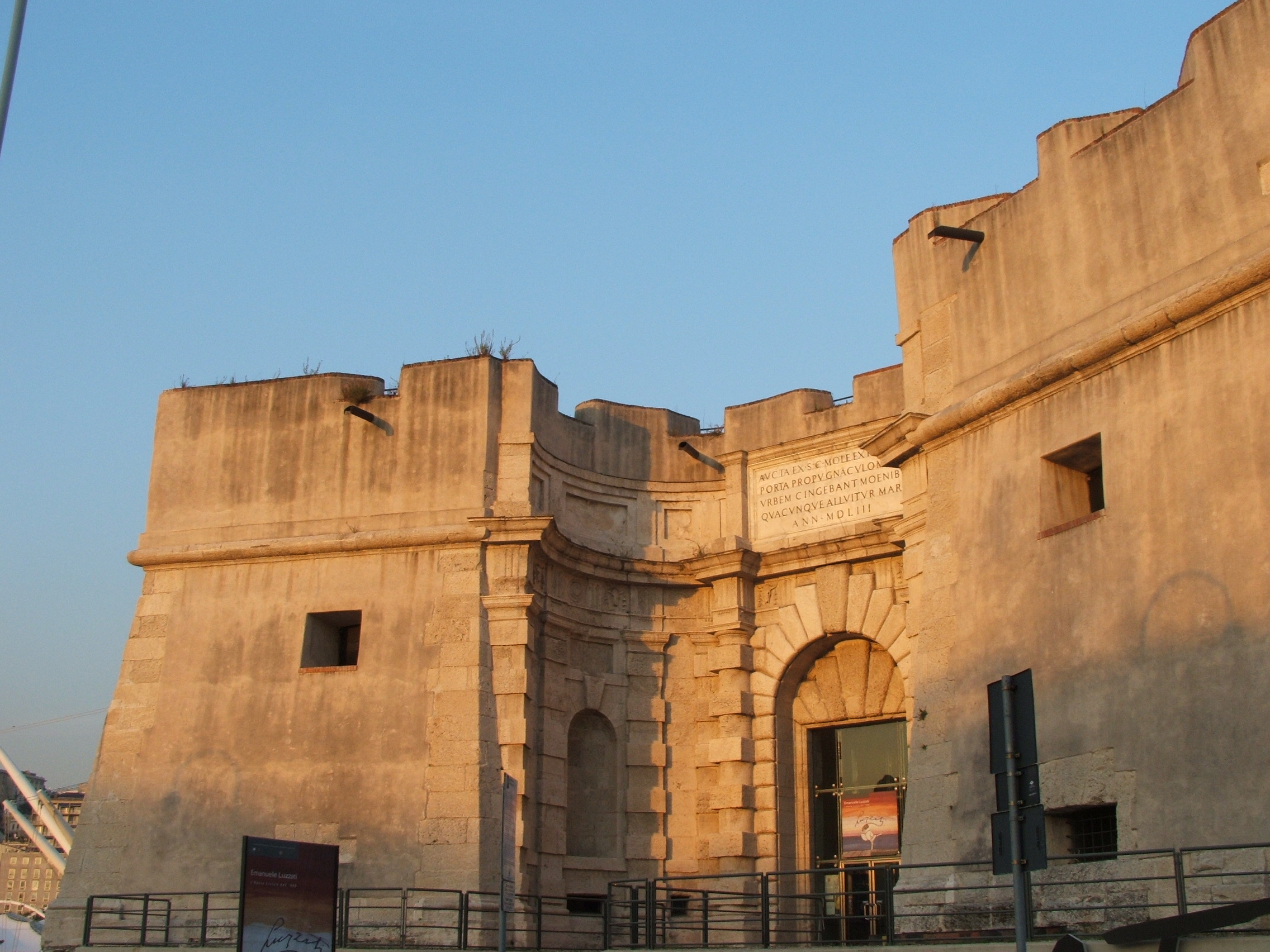
Porta Siberia, designed by Galeazzo Alessi.

A set of walls was also built along the sea, including the entire shoreline between the St. Thomas Gate and the Molo Vecchio (Old Pier). In this stretch of wall, new gates were created, one for each pier of the port. At the end of Molo Vecchio in the second half of the century, Galeazzo Alessi designed Porta Siberia, an example of Renaissance military architecture. From here, the walls are linked to those already existing on the sea side of Sarzano and Carignano hills, and they reach the mouth of Bisagno stream. Of the three main gates of the 16th-century walls, Porta Siberia and the Porta degli Archi (moved from the original location for the opening of Via XX Settembre) still stand today, while the St. Thomas Gate was demolished to build the Principe railway station.

== The Mura Nuove (New Walls) ==
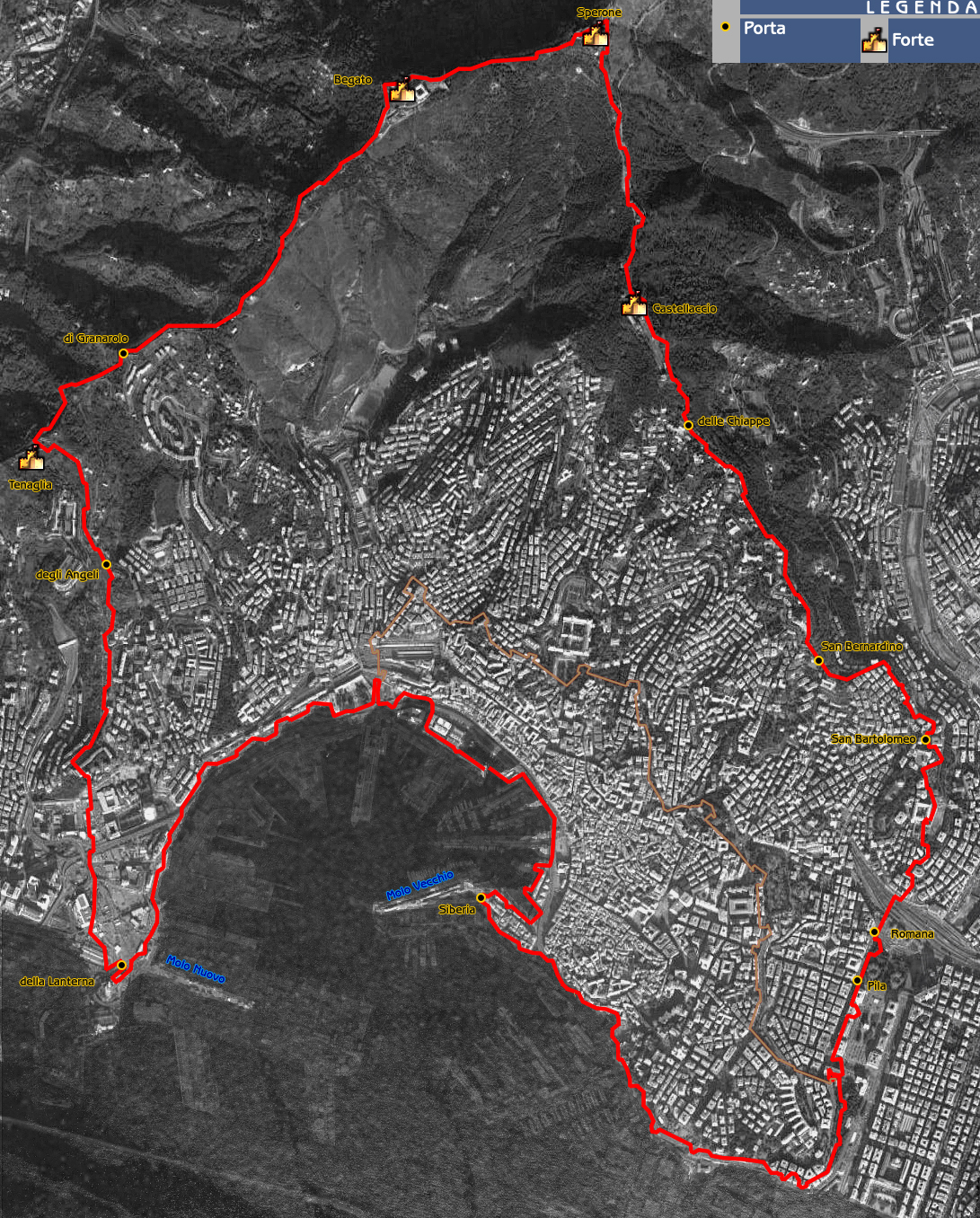
Map of Genoa with the New Walls

The “Mura Nuove” (New Walls) are the last and most imposing walls built along the ridge of the hills encircling downtown Genoa, and were built in the first half of the 17th century.

The view of Genoa from the sea is characterized by the line of New Walls with their fortifications, on the ridge of the hills, above the hilly quarters which grew after World War II; coming from the north, by train or car, the first visible structure is the mass of Fort Diamante, high on the mount on the left bank of the Val Polcevera, and the Fort Fratello Minore. Shortly after, on the ridge in the distance is Fort Begato, included in the line of bastions that rise up to the top of Mount Peralto, where sits Fort Sperone with its high walls.

The “New Walls”, the last and largest city walls, were built starting in 1626, after the repeated attempts of Charles Emmanuel I of Savoy to invade Genoa had convinced the government of the need for new and more powerful defensive walls.

Although this defensive wall had already been suggested in 1568, the government of Genoa began the work in 1626, following the failed attack on 10 May 1625 of a French-Piedmontese army at the Pertuso Pass (where, in memory of the event, was later built the Shrine of Nostra Signora della Vittoria, meaning "Our Lady of Victory").

In less than four years, between 1629 and 1633, an army of diggers, bricklayers, and stonemasons (eight hundred, according to some sources, even three thousand according to others), divided into twenty-eight teams, raised curtains and bastions along the two ridges overlooking the valleys of Polcevera and Bisagno.

The project was carried out by mathematicians Vincenzo Maculano and Giovanni Battista Baliani, a friend of Galileo Galilei. Supervision of the work was entrusted to Ansaldo De Mari with the cooperation of the Lombard architect Bartolomeo Bianco

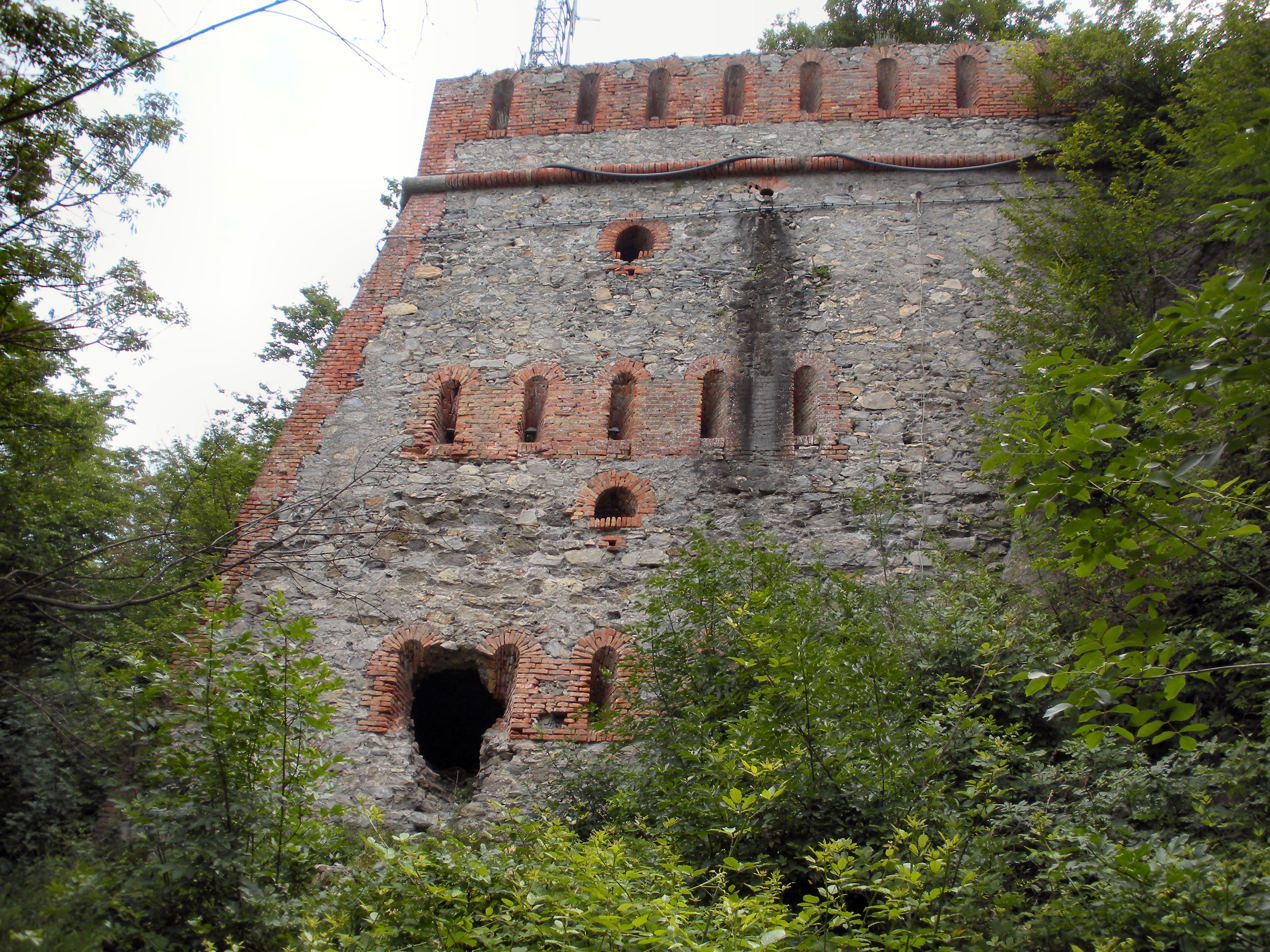
A bastion of the Begato walls

The “New Walls” extended for almost twenty kilometers, of which seven were along the coastline. Their construction caused the incorporation of the quarter of San Teodoro within the walls. The walls, seen from above, have a triangular shape, the vertices being Mount Peralto, the lighthouse, and the mouth of the Bisagno stream.

Fortifications beginning from the Lighthouse of Genoa climb Granarolo Hill then reach mount Peralto, where the curtains overlooking Val Polcevera and those overlooking Val Bisagno meet; then they descend the plain along the final stretch of the Bisagno, protected by powerful bastions known as “Fronti Basse”. The waterfront was completed to defend the coastline from the lighthouse up to the western limit of the old walls (St. Thomas Gate).

This structure was built on the hills even on steep slopes, in areas still sparsely populated today. This has contributed to their preservation, while the sections closest to the city were mostly demolished for the construction of new quarters and other infrastructure.

The length of the “New Walls” reached 19,560 meters, enclosing an area of 903 hectares (nearly five times the 197 hectares included in the ”old walls” until the 16th century).

=== The Eastern ridge ===
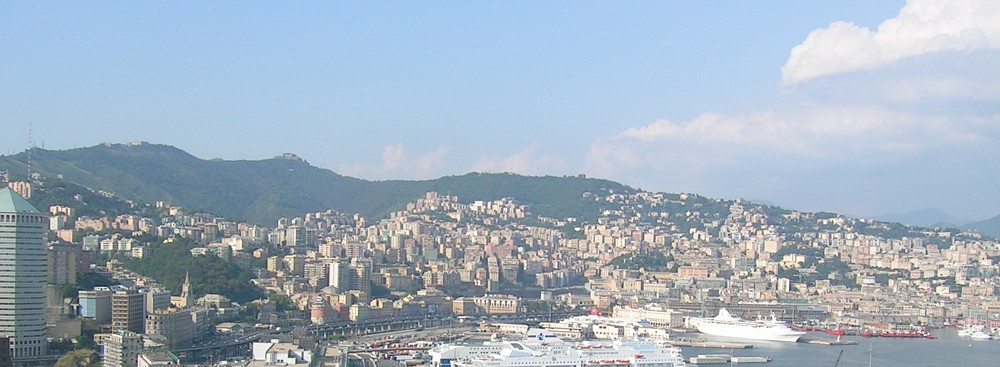
The Eastern ridge

From Fort Sperone, after a short stretch towards the southeast (Peralto Walls), the walls meet Fort Castellaccio and then different section of walls, named “Chiappe”, “Sant'Erasmo”, “San Bernardino”, and “Zerbino”, ending above Brignole railway station. The section of walls which used to stand here, named "Walls of Montesano", were demolished in the 19th century to allow construction of the railway station.

The city's urban expansion eastward in the last decades of the 19th century caused the demolition of one of the most powerful and evocative parts of the New Walls, the so-called “Fronti Basse”, a huge rampart that ran straight, with two large bastions in the plain on the right bank of the Bisagno. This large structure linked the New Walls with the “Sixteenth century walls” from the place where now stands the railway station, up to the “Walls of Prato”.

In the "Fronti Basse" there were two gates, the monumental Porta Pila (by Bartolomeo Bianco), at the end of Via Giulia (due to the completion of Via XX Settembre the gate was moved behind Brignole station), and "Porta Romana", at the end of Via San Vincenzo, where the ancient road to the east quarters began.

=== The Western ridge ===
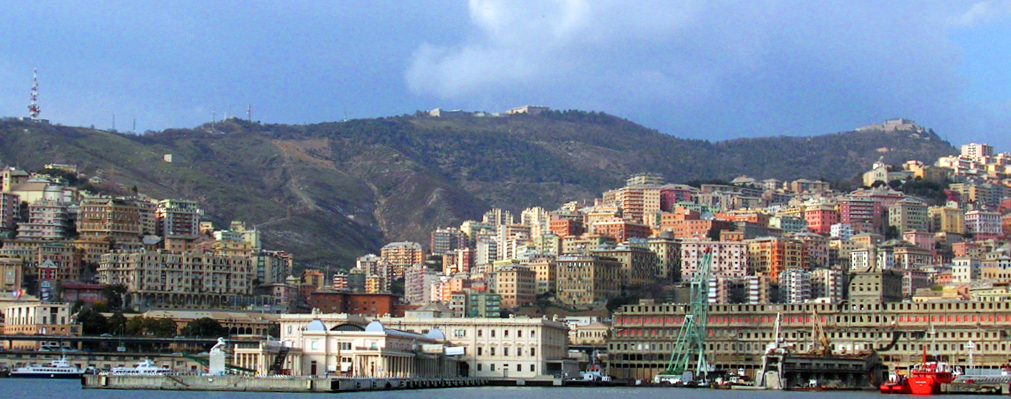
The Western ridge

From the top of Mount Peralto, where Fort Sperone sits, walls come down towards the southwest in a straight line to Fort Begato, then continue to fall along the panoramic road which runs along the curtain walk, taking first the name "Walls of Granarolo" near the gate of the same name, then “Walls of Monte Moro”. After Fort Tenaglia, the walls continue as "Walls of Porta Murata" to reach the “Angeli Gate” and the “Walls of Angeli”, where nowadays they stop abruptly due to the excavation, in the 1930s, of San Benigno Hill, an imposing rocky ridge where formerly stood the church and monastery of San Benigno, later turned into barracks. The “walls of San Benigno” ran along the ridge of this hill and went to the lighthouse of Lanterna and the Lanterna Gate.

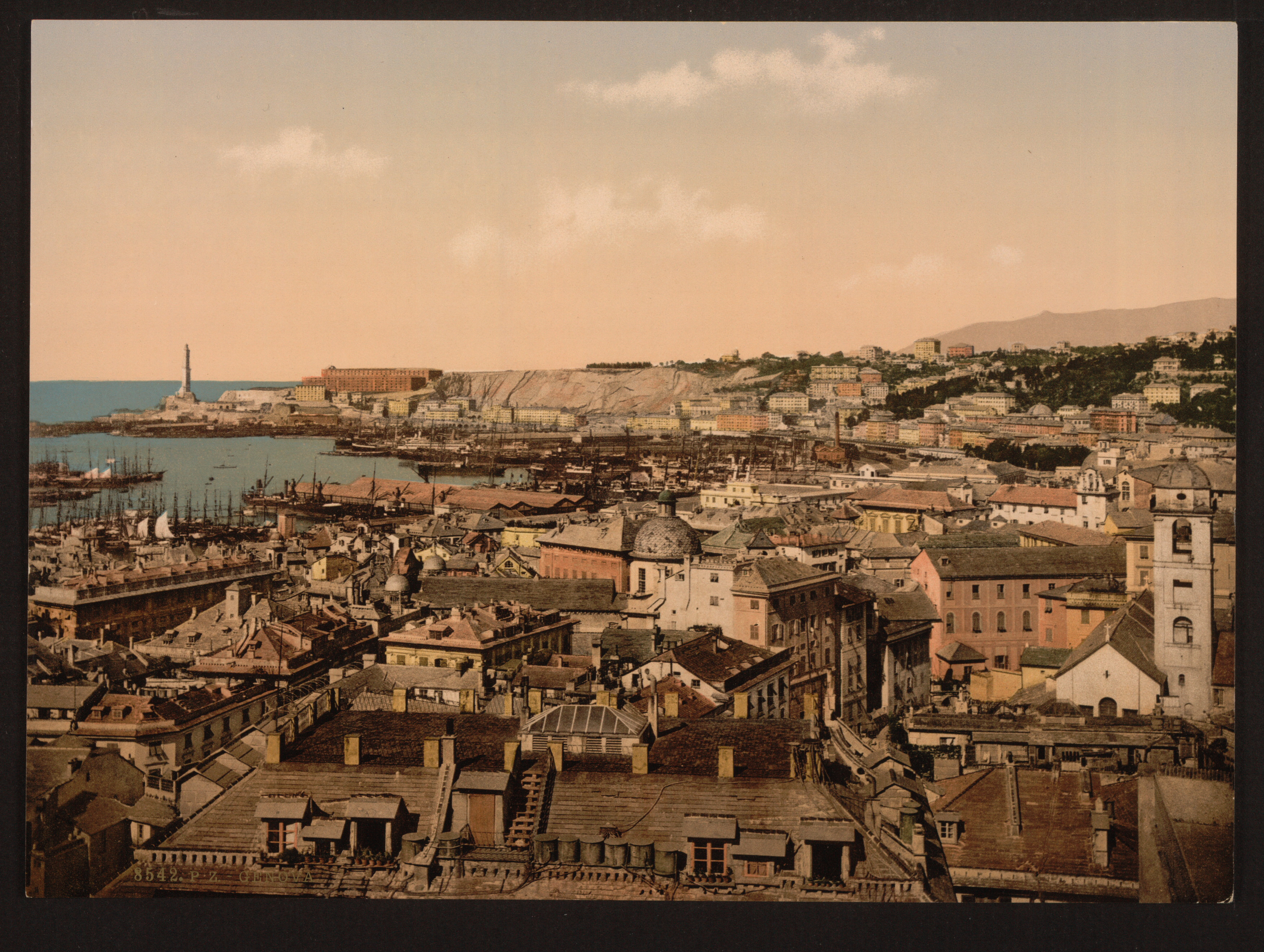
View of Genoa with San Benigno hill, its walls and barracks in an image from the 19th century

=== The waterfront ===
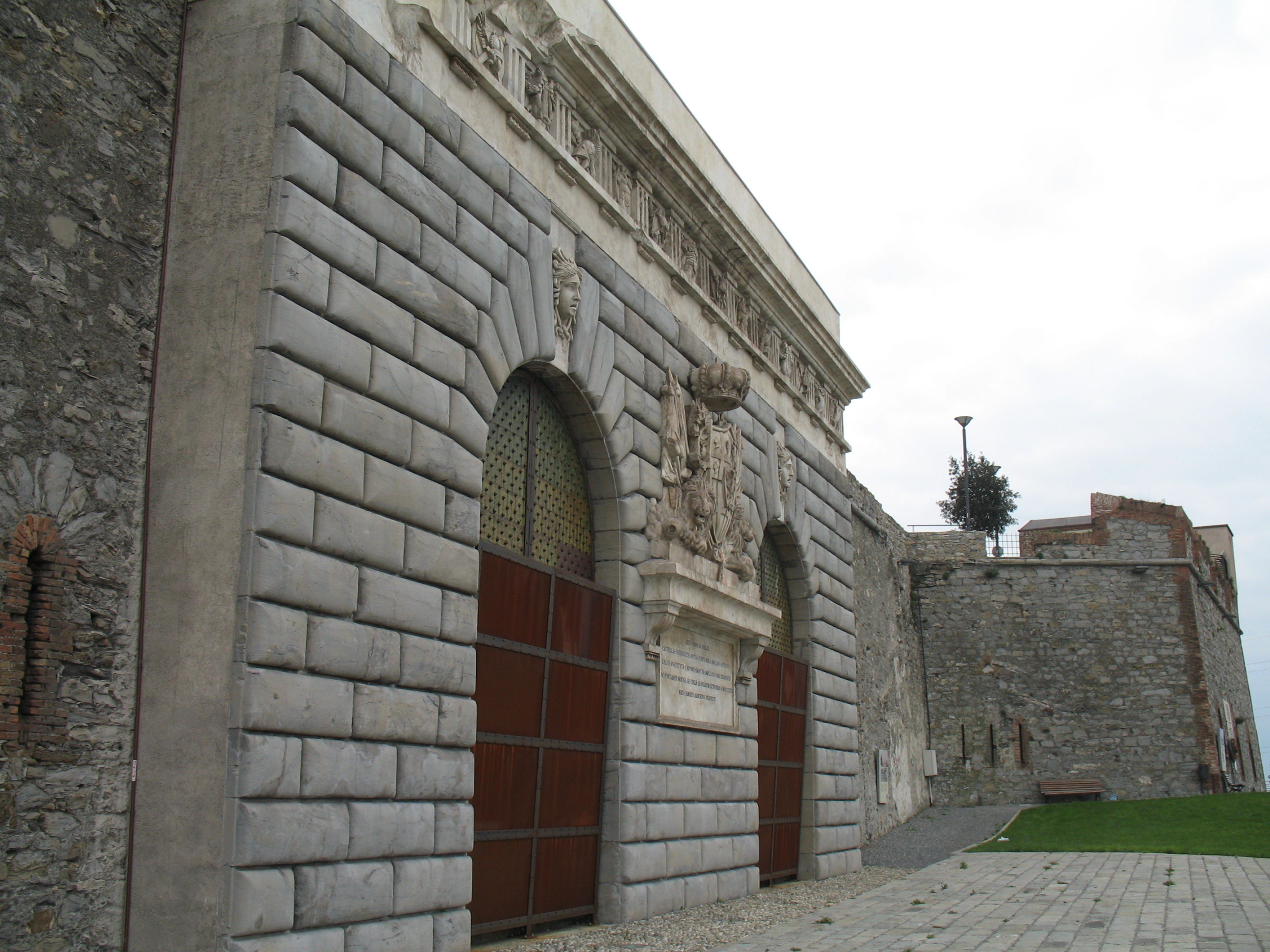
“Porta Nuova”, the 19th-century gate near the Lanterna

With the 17th-century expansion, the walls along the coast were reinforced with new bastions and extended beyond St. Thomas Gate to Capo Faro, where they met those descending along the western ridge. Due to port expansion, most of the walls along the sea were demolished; only a short stretch survives, recently enhanced with a walk from the ferry terminal to the lighthouse. Close by the lighthouse there was the monumental Lantern Gate, projected by Antonio Ponsonelli, built in 1633, and demolished in 1830 following the construction of a new gate a short distance away, “Porta Nuova” (New Gate), which was better suited to increased traffic.

=== The fortresses ===
During the 18th century and the first half of the 19th, along the perimeter of the walls were built some fortifications, including Castellaccio, Sperone (on the top of Mount Peralto), Begato, and Tenaglia. Other forts were built in different periods on the hills outside the city walls and along the ridge on the left bank of Val Bisagno. Most of the Genoese fortifications (a total of 16) are still visible and some of them also visited.

In the second half of the 18th century, immediately after the Austrian siege of 1747, the fortifications were expanded with the construction of four fortresses external to the walls: Diamante, Quezzi, Richelieu, and Santa Tecla, designed by French military engineers Jacques De Sicre and Pierre De Cotte.

During the siege of Genoa of April 1800, these forts were the site of many harsh battles between French and Austrian armies.

After the annexation of the Napoleonic Ligurian Republic to the Kingdom of Sardinia, decided by the Congress of Vienna in 1814, the Savoy government (1815–1840) built a series of forts, towers, and coastal batteries, making Genoa the best equipped fortress in the Mediterranean. The designer of this last phase of construction of the Genoese fortifications was major Giulio D'Andreis.

Forts along the perimeter of the New Walls include:

- Fort Castellaccio (including Torre Specola)
- Fort Sperone
- Fort Begato
- Fort Tenaglia

Western Forts (Sampierdarena) include:

- Fort Crocetta
- Fort Belvedere (no longer existing)

Forts on the ridges north of the walls include:

- Fort Puìn
- Fort Fratello Minore
- Fort Fratello Maggiore (demolished in 1932)
- Fort Diamante

Eastern Forts (Val Bisagno, Albaro):

- Fort San Giuliano (now headquarters of the Provincial Command of the Carabinieri)
- Fort San Martino
- Fort Santa Tecla
- Fort Quezzi
- Fort Richelieu
- Fort Monteratti

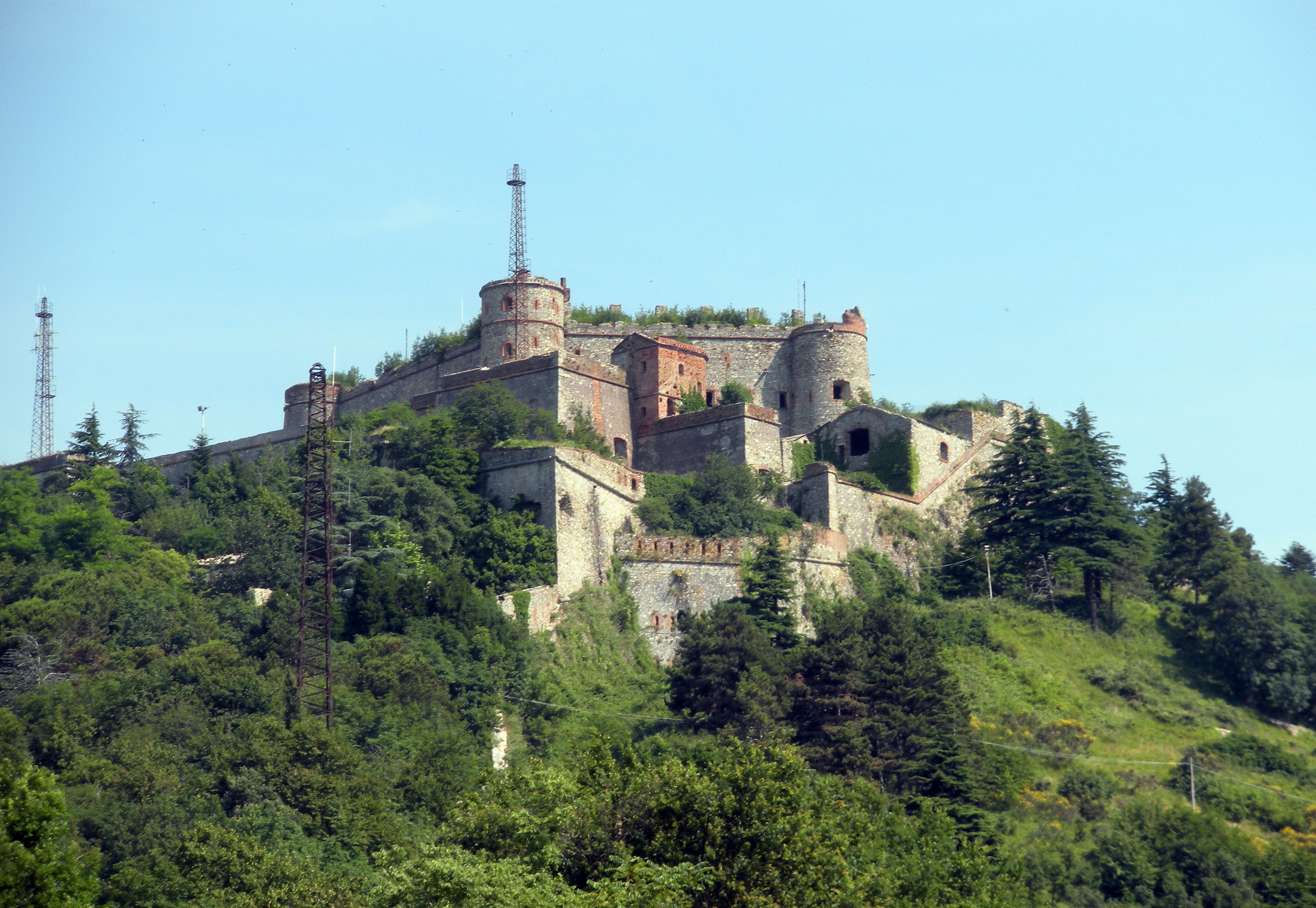
Fort Sperone

=== 19th-century towers ===
In 1820, the Engineering Military Corps of the Kingdom of Sardinia started to build a set of towers, external to the walls, similar to Martello towers. A few years later, due to cost and low usefulness, their construction was stopped. Only three of them were completed: Torre Quezzi, Torre San Bernardino, and Torre Zerbino (the last one no longer existing). Others still exist in the condition in which they were left when the work was stopped, missing the second floor and the roof.

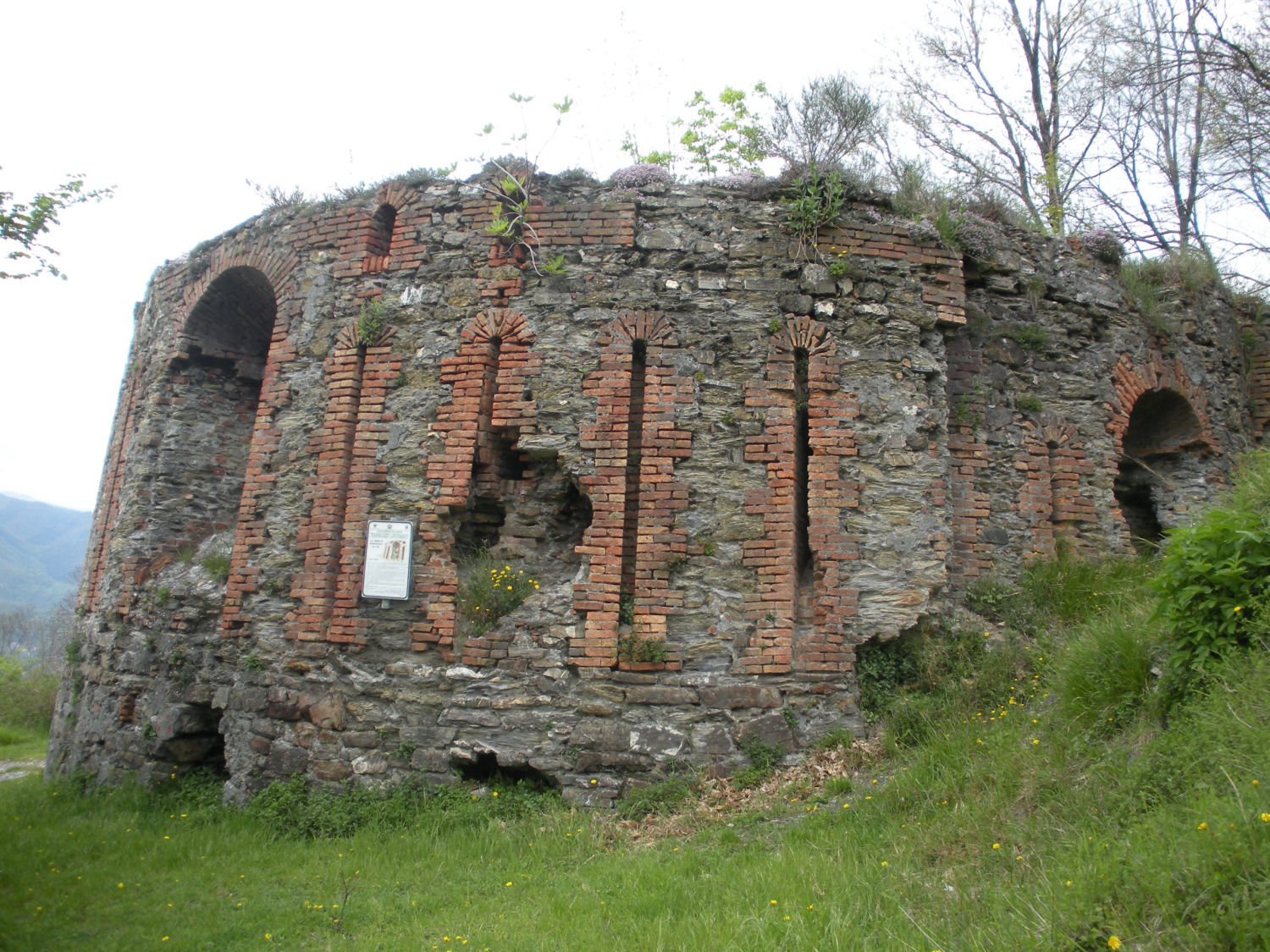
Granarolo tower

=== New Walls today ===
The new walls and forts, once the purposes for which they were planned were gone, were decommissioned from military property in 1914. After this date, some of these structures were used as warehouses, jails for prisoners of war during World War I, anti-aircraft emplacements, or houses for evacuees during World War II. Others were given to private ownership or left abandoned. Nowadays, although they are public property, their condition is not uniform: the main fortresses have recently been restored and may be visited on request, others, even if in a state of decay, are freely visited, and some of them host television or cellphone towers.

The only fort still used by a military institution is Fort San Giuliano, which overlooks Corso Italia, in the quarter of Albaro, now headquarters of the Provincial Command of the Carabinieri.

The "New Walls" and the forts are now included in the "Parco Urbano delle Mura" (City Park of Walls), having a surface of 876 hectares, which is the largest green "lung" of Genoa, and provides the possibility of different excursions of historic and wildlife interest.

== Sources ==
- Stefano Finauri, Forti di Genova: storia, tecnica e architettura dei fortini difensivi, Edizioni Servizi Editoriali, Genoa 2007, ISBN 978-88-89384-27-5
- Riccardo Dellepiane, Mura e fortificazioni di Genova, Nuova Editrice Genovese, Genoa 1984 (reprinted in 2008, ISBN 978-88-88963-22-8)
- Piera Melli, La città ritrovata. Archeologia urbana a Genova (1984–1994), Tormena Editore 1948, Genoa, 1996 - ISBN 88-86017-62-6
- Ennio Poleggi, Paolo Cevini, Le città nella storia d'Italia, Laterza, Rome-Bari 1981
- Pietro Barozzi, Mura e forti di Genova, on "L'Universo", bimonthly magazine of “Istituto Geografico Militare”, year LVII - N.1 January–February 1977
- Corinna Praga, Porta Soprana: le mura del Barbarossa, SAGEP editrice, Genoa 1998 - ISBN 88-7058-690-1
