= Via di Francia =

Road going from Paris to Rome

The Via di Francia, when it does not simply mean per via di Francia, "by way of France", was the designation in Italy of a medieval route that led from Paris to Rome. For instance, in documents drawn up at Paris, 3 August 1261, Iacopo, son of Sigerio dei Gallerani, recently freed, promises upon pain of 1000 marks, to return to Siena by mid-September, e di non riprendere la via di Francia and not to take the via di Francia once more.

A coastal stretch in Genoa retains the old name, and a stretch of the Via di Francia led from coastal San Remo to the shrine of the Madonna della Costa.

== See also ==
- Via Francigena
