= Zarzaitine =

- Village
- Location within Algeria
- Coordinates: 28°5′10″N 9°47′16″E
- Country: Algeria
- Province: Illizi
- District: In Amenas
- Commune: In Amenas
- Time zone: UTC+01 (CET)

Zarzaitine (also written Zarzaïtine) is an industrial village in the commune of In Amenas, in In Amenas District, Illizi Province, eastern Algeria. It is a notable mining area, with significant deposits of sulphur and crude oil in particular.

== Geography ==
Zarzaitine is a border town between Algeria and Libya, located just to the northeast of In Aménas. The Trapsa Oil Pipeline connects it to Edjeleh, which is located about 30 miles (48 km) to the south. In Aménas Airport is in the vicinity, also known as Zarzaitine Airport. Geologically this area is known as the Zarzaitine Formation, consisting mainly of red-brown sandstone, and dinosaur bones dated to the Triassic have been unearthed here. The Zarzantine (Triassic) formation is found in the Marzuq Basin. The formation is reported to be 130 metres (430 ft) thick which reduces to 90 metres (300 ft) thickness towards the south because erosive action. Zarzaitine oil field is located in the south-eastern Illizi basin.

== History ==
The name Zarzaitine was given to this formation by Albert-Félix de Lapparent and Maurice Lelubre, in 1948. Oil and gas production took off dramatically in the 1960s, becoming CREP's most productive site. and in 1962 alone 12 wells were drilled at Zarzaitine. In 1961, Zarzaitine was considered to be the largest oil field of the eastern Sahara, with primary reserves of 80 million tons. In the 21st century it is still an important oil site in Algeria; in 2002, Chinese company Sinopec signed a $525 million contract with the national Algerian oil company Sonatrach to develop the Zarzaitine oil field. It is estimated that Algeria produces two million tons of crude from this oil field annually.
