= Zaouia Sidi Moussa =

- Village
- Location within Algeria
- Coordinates: 28°6′23″N 6°45′14″E
- Country: Algeria
- Province: Illizi Province
- District: In Amenas District
- Commune: Bordj Omar Driss
- Elevation: 357 m (1,171 ft)
- Time zone: UTC+1 (CET)
- Postal code: 33003

Zaouia Sidi Moussa is a village, and religious center, in the commune of Bordj Omar Driss, in In Amenas District, Illizi Province, Algeria.
