= Bordj Omar Driss =

Bordj Omar Driss برج عمار إدريس
- Town and Commune
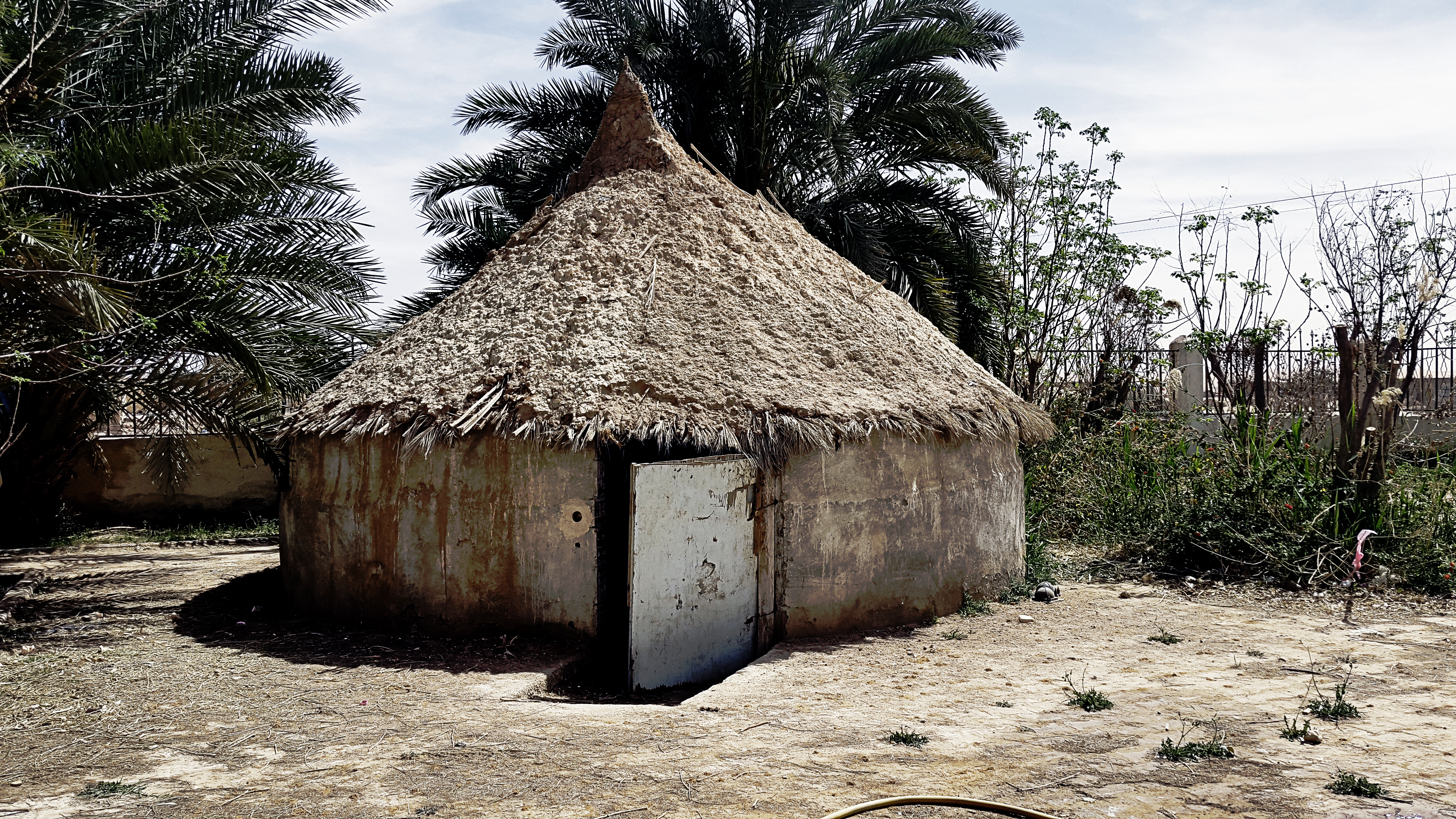

- Location of Bordj Omar Driss commune within Illizi Province

- Location of Bordj Omar Driss within Algeria
- Coordinates: 28°08′47″N 6°49′32″E
- Country: Algeria
- Province: Illizi
- District: In Amenas

Government
  - PMA Seats: 7

Area
  - Total: 82,280 km^{2} (31,770 sq mi)

Population (2008)
  - Total: 5,736
  - Density: 0.06971/km^{2} (0.1806/sq mi)
- Time zone: UTC+01 (CET)
- Postal code: 33210
- ONS code: 3304

Bordj Omar Driss is a town and commune in In Amenas District, Illizi Province, Algeria. According to the 2008 census it has a population of 5,736, up from 3,547 in 1998, and an annual population growth rate of 5.0%. Its postal code is 33210 and its municipal code is 3304.

== Geography ==
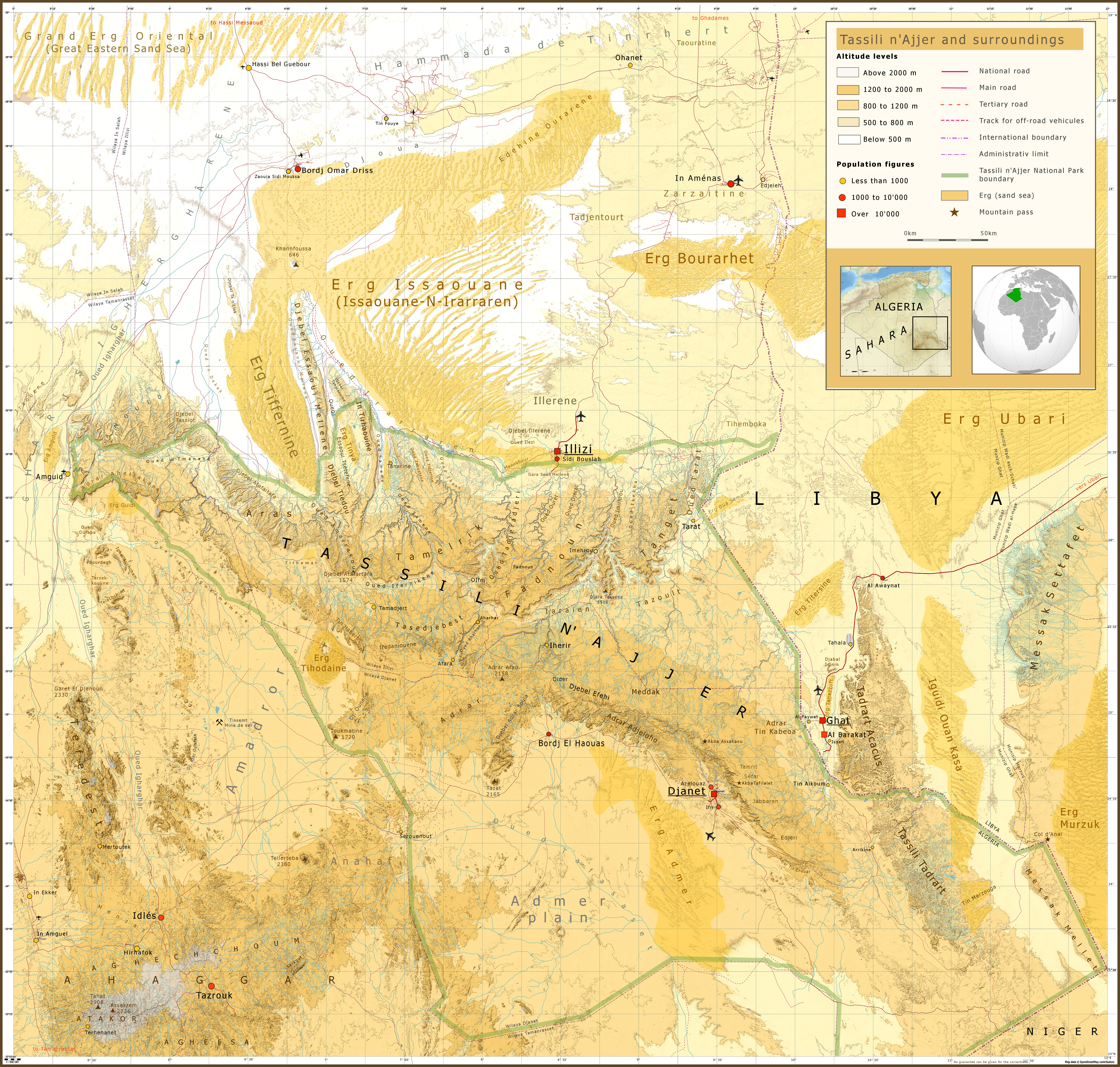
Map of Tassili n'Ajjer with Bordj Omar Driss north of Erg Issaouane

Bordj Omar Driss lies at an elevation of 354 metres (1,161 ft) at the south-western end of the Hamada de Tinrhert Desert, a vast rocky region of the Sahara Desert that extends eastwards into Libya. To the south of the town is an area of sand dunes, beyond which lies the mountain range Djebel Essaoui Mellene, an extension of the Tassili n'Ajjer range.

== Climate ==
Bordj Omar Driss has a hot desert climate (Köppen climate classification BWh), with long and extremely hot summers with averages high temperatures well above 40 °C (104 °F) during June, July and August and brief and very warm winters with averages low temperatures below 4 °C (39.2 °F) in January, the coldest month of the year as well as very little precipitation throughout the entire year as the town averages only about 25 mm of rainfall.

Climate data for Bordj Omar Driss
Month	Jan	Feb	Mar	Apr	May	Jun	Jul	Aug	Sep	Oct	Nov	Dec	Year
Mean daily maximum °C (°F)	19.5 (67.1)	22.9 (73.2)	26.8 (80.2)	32.2 (90.0)	36.2 (97.2)	41.3 (106.3)	43.4 (110.1)	42.3 (108.1)	39.0 (102.2)	33.4 (92.1)	26.8 (80.2)	21.2 (70.2)	32.1 (89.7)
Daily mean °C (°F)	11.5 (52.7)	14.6 (58.3)	18.4 (65.1)	23.6 (74.5)	28.1 (82.6)	33.2 (91.8)	34.5 (94.1)	33.7 (92.7)	30.9 (87.6)	25.3 (77.5)	18.5 (65.3)	13.2 (55.8)	23.8 (74.8)
Mean daily minimum °C (°F)	3.5 (38.3)	6.3 (43.3)	10.1 (50.2)	15.1 (59.2)	20.1 (68.2)	25.1 (77.2)	25.7 (78.3)	25.1 (77.2)	22.9 (73.2)	17.3 (63.1)	10.2 (50.4)	5.2 (41.4)	15.6 (60.0)
Average precipitation mm (inches)	5 (0.2)	1 (0.0)	2 (0.1)	4 (0.2)	1 (0.0)	1 (0.0)	0 (0)	0 (0)	1 (0.0)	1 (0.0)	4 (0.2)	5 (0.2)	25 (0.9)
Source: climate-data.org

== Agriculture and stock breeding ==
The city is surrounded by agricultural land: 25 hectares for vegetable cultivation, 21 hectares for grain, and 10 hectares for date palms (2017). It is said that only a quarter of the potential is being exploited.

The veterinary office of the province of Illizi recorded 50 camel owners with a total of 3,312 camels in the municipality of Bordj Omar Driss for the year 2020. In a study on camel husbandry in this municipality, 22 of these camel owners were surveyed the following year. The author writes that the main activity is family-run livestock farming, with small livestock (sheep and goats) and, above all, extensive breeding of dromedaries. About three-quarters of them are breeders who keep the animals until they are fattened, while the others are breeders and fatteners. While camel milk is used for young animals and personal consumption, the animals are sold to supply meat to the population. Those who do not keep small livestock in addition to camel breeding work as municipal employees or traders. Three-quarters of camel owners live as sedentary people in the city or a village and have their herds looked after by shepherds. The others live as semi-nomads, traveling with their camels to different grazing areas from September to March. The animals are not tended during the remaining months. The other members of their families live in permanent homes. The age distribution of the respondents was fairly even, so there is no shortage of young people entering the animal husbandry profession.

== Transportation ==
A road connects Bordj Omar Driss to the N3 national highway (to Hassi Messaoud to the north and In Amenas to the east) at the village of Hassi Bel Guebour. The town in served by Bordj Omar Driss Airport.

== Education ==
4.5% of the population has a tertiary education, and another 11.1% has completed secondary education. The overall literacy rate is 73.0%, and is 81.9% among males and 62.7% among females.

== Localities ==
The commune is composed of eight localities:

- Centre de Bordj Omar Driss
- Zaouia Sidi Moussa
- Hassi Bel Guebour
- Tit
- Tinfouye
- Dayen
- Hassi Tamenkort
- Rhoud Ennous
