= Algeria–Norway relations =

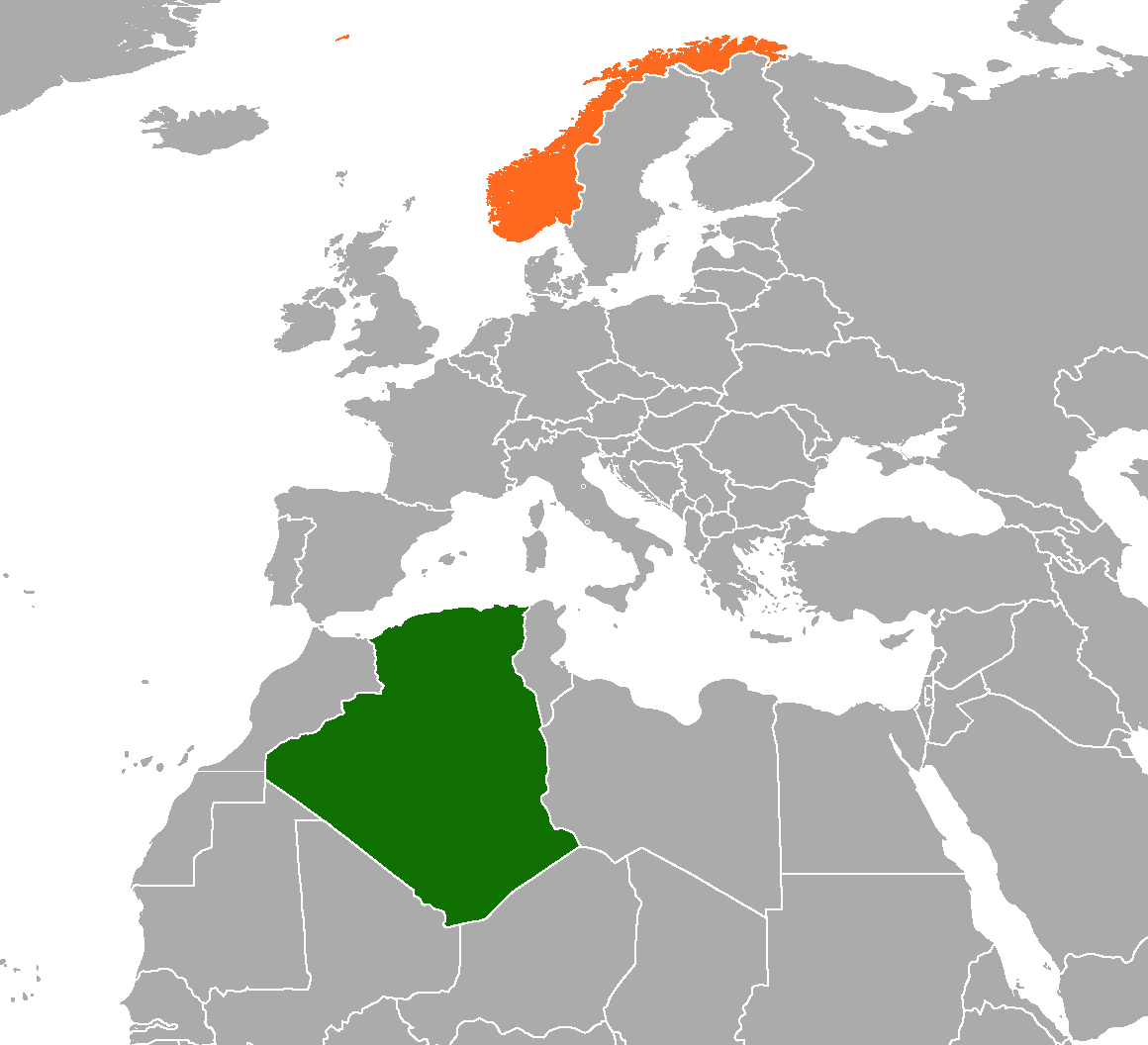
- Algeria: Norway

Algeria–Norway relations are the bilateral relations between Algeria and Norway. Algeria has an embassy in Oslo and Norway has an embassy in Algiers.

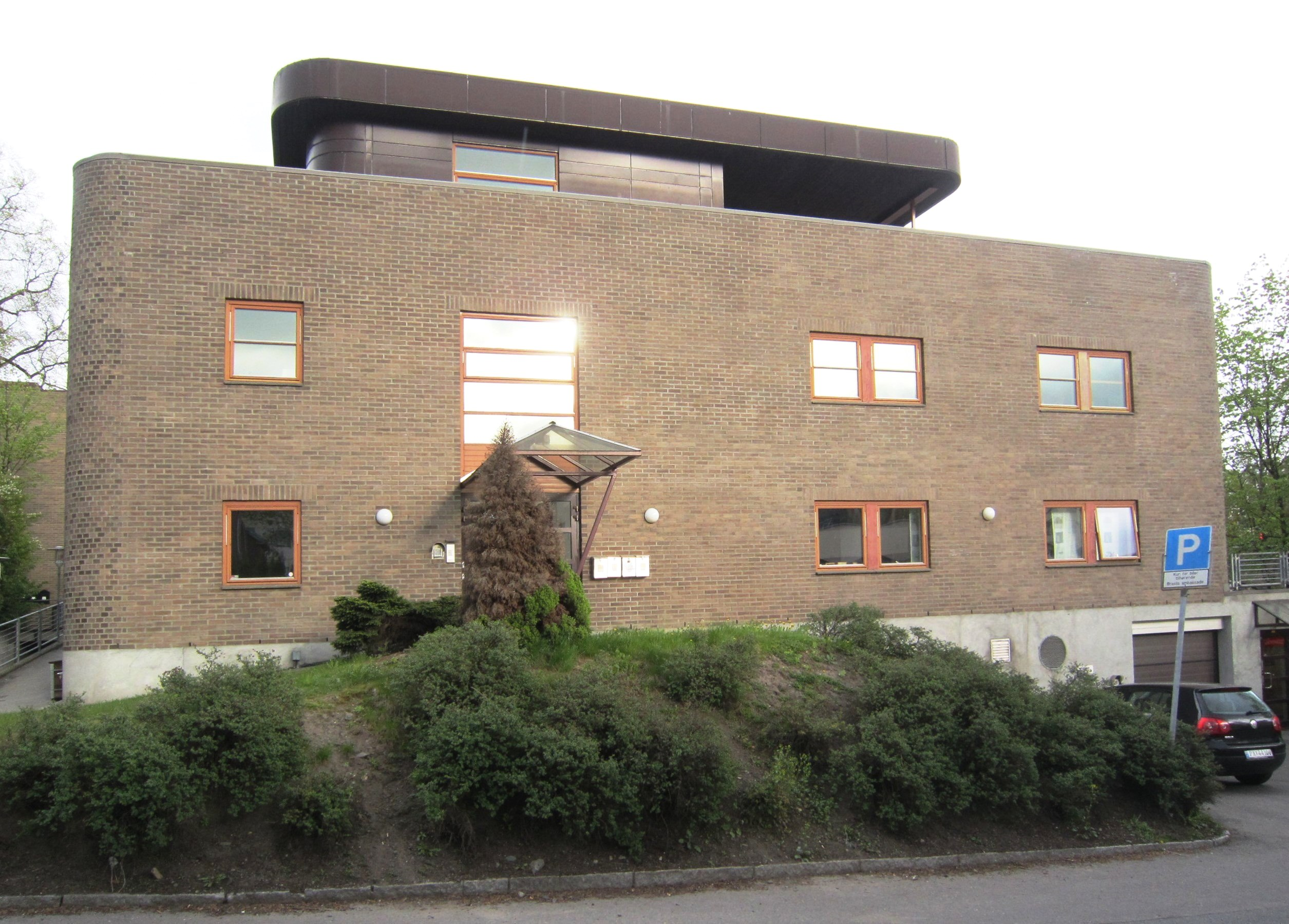
Embassy of Algeria in Oslo

As a seafaring nation in pre-modernity, Norwegian sailors regularly came across ships from the Barbary States.

Relations between Algeria and Norway were not substantial, though an inquiry was made in 1979 whether Norway should open an embassy there. Instead, Norway later established an embassy in Tunisia to facilitate the Oslo Process.

Like in Angola and Nigeria, Algeria's petroleum sector attracted investments from the Norwegian state-owned petroleum company Statoil. From 2003 Statoil was a co-owner of the oil fields at In Amenas and In Salah. Investing billions of Norwegian kroner in Algeria, Statoil lobbied to move the Tunis embassy to Algiers. The move was carried through in 2007. Norway's ambassador to Algeria now has a side accreditation to Tunisia.

In the 2000s, Algeria wanted to buy products from the Norwegian military industry. Norway's Ministry of Foreign Affairs refused a permit to sell to Algeria on three occasions, in 2004, 2007 and 2008, before accepting in 2011. Algeria subsequently purchased weapons control systems developed by Kongsberg Defence & Aerospace. In 2012, the Algerian fregate La Soumman embarked on an official visit to Oslo. In 2013, the In Amenas hostage crisis saw the killing of 5 Norwegian citizens, who were Statoil employees. Norway offered to send special forces to Algeria to root out the attackers, but Algeria declined.

== See also ==
- Foreign relations of Algeria
- Foreign relations of Norway
