= Tarat =

Tarat may refer to:

Places

- Tarat, Algeria, a village in Illizi Province, Algeria
- Tarat, Malaysia, a village in Sarawak, Malaysia
- Tarat (state constituency), represented in the Sarawak State Legislative Assembly
- Tarat, Russia, a rural locality (a selo) in Megino-Kangalassky District of the Sakha Republic, Russia

Biology

- Tarat (Lanius cristatus lucionensis), a subspecies of the brown shrike.

== See also ==
- Tarata Province
