= Hassi Bel Guebour =

- Village
- Location within Algeria
- Coordinates: 28°41′21″N 6°30′21″E
- Country: Algeria
- Province: Illizi Province
- District: In Amenas District
- Commune: Bordj Omar Driss
- Elevation: 327 m (1,073 ft)
- Time zone: UTC+1 (CET)

Hassi Bel Guebour (also written Hassi Bel Guebbor) is a village in the commune of Bordj Omar Driss, in In Amenas District, Illizi Province, Algeria. It is located at the intersection of the N3 national highway and the local road to Bordj Omar Driss.
