= Merixen =

- Village
- Location within Algeria
- Coordinates: 30°8′37″N 9°19′20″E
- Country: Algeria
- Province: Illizi Province
- District: In Amenas District
- Commune: Debdeb
- Elevation: 314 m (1,030 ft)
- Time zone: UTC+1 (CET)

Merixen (also written Mariksene) is a village in the commune of Debdeb, in In Amenas District, Illizi Province, Algeria, located on the southern edge of the Grand Erg Oriental.
