= Ohanet =

- Village
- Location within Algeria
- Coordinates: 28°42′10″N 8°55′7″E
- Country: Algeria
- Province: Illizi Province
- District: In Amenas District
- Commune: In Amenas
- Elevation: 580 m (1,900 ft)
- Time zone: UTC+1 (CET)

Ohanet is an industrial village in the commune of In Amenas, in In Amenas District, Illizi Province, Algeria.
