= Midad Energy =

Saudi Arabian energy investor-operator company

- Native name: مداد للطاقة
- Type: Private
- Industry: petroleum industry
- Founded: 2007; 19 years ago
- Headquarters: Riyadh, Saudi Arabia
- Key people: Abdulelah Mohammed Al Aiban (President and CEO)
- Website: midadenergy.com

Midad Energy (Arabic: مداد للطاقة) is a Saudi energy investor‑operator headquartered in Riyadh, Saudi Arabia. The company operates across the oil and gas value chain, including exploration, development, production, and strategic energy investments. Midad Energy operates independently and is not affiliated with any holding group or larger corporate conglomerate.

== History ==
On March 4, 2024, Midad Energy signed an agreement with Sonatrach, Algeria’s national state-owned oil company, to evaluate and develop gas fields in Illizi Province in southeastern Algeria. The production-sharing model agreement aims to accelerate hydrocarbon development and increase Algeria's gas reserves through investments financed by Midad Energy.

In October 2025, Midad Energy signed a contract with Sonatrach valued at approximately $5.4 billion for oil and gas exploration and development in the Illizi Basin in southern Algeria, located approximately 100 kilometers south of the town of In Amenas near the Libyan border.

Approximately $288 million of the investment was allocated to exploration activities. The agreement spans 30 years and targets production of approximately 933 million barrels of oil equivalent.

In December 2025, Midad Energy was among several companies, including ExxonMobil, Chevron, and The Carlyle Group, that submitted bids to acquire the Western-sanctioned international assets of Russian oil company Lukoil, Russia's second-largest oil producer. The assets were valued at approximately $22 billion and include oilfields, refineries, and thousands of fuel stations outside Russia.

In February 2026, Midad Energy signed a preliminary agreement with Russian company Lukoil to acquire its international assets. The agreement includes a provision requiring the cash offer to be deposited into an escrow account pending necessary regulatory approvals, including approval from the United States Department of the Treasury, to complete the acquisition under the constraints imposed on Russian assets.

== Leadership ==
The company is led by Abdulelah bin Mohammed Al‑Aiban, who serves as Chairman and Chief Executive Officer of Midad Energy.
