= Tamadjert =

- Village
- Location within Algeria
- Coordinates: 25°36′49″N 7°19′20″E
- Country: Algeria
- Province: Illizi Province
- District: Illizi District
- Commune: Illizi
- Elevation: 1,148 m (3,766 ft)
- Time zone: UTC+1 (CET)

Tamadjert (also written Tamdjert or Tamadjart) is a village in the commune of Illizi, in Illizi Province, Algeria. It is located in the Tassili n'Ajjer mountain range at the western edge of the Tassili n'Ajjer National Park. The village is the site of a project to introduce solar energy to Algeria, with 48 households connected to 8 solar power systems. Its coordinates are 28.2503, 7.901.
