= Tarat, Algeria =

Tarat
- Village
- Location within Algeria
- Coordinates: 26°6′57″N 9°21′10″E
- Country: Algeria
- Province: Illizi Province
- District: Illizi District
- Commune: Illizi
- Elevation: 614 m (2,014 ft)
- Time zone: UTC+1 (CET)

Tarat is a village in the commune of Illizi, in Illizi Province, Algeria, located near the border with Libya beside a wadi beneath the eastern edge of the Tassili n'Ajjer mountain range.

== See also ==
- Tihoubar
