= Algeria–Libya border =

International border

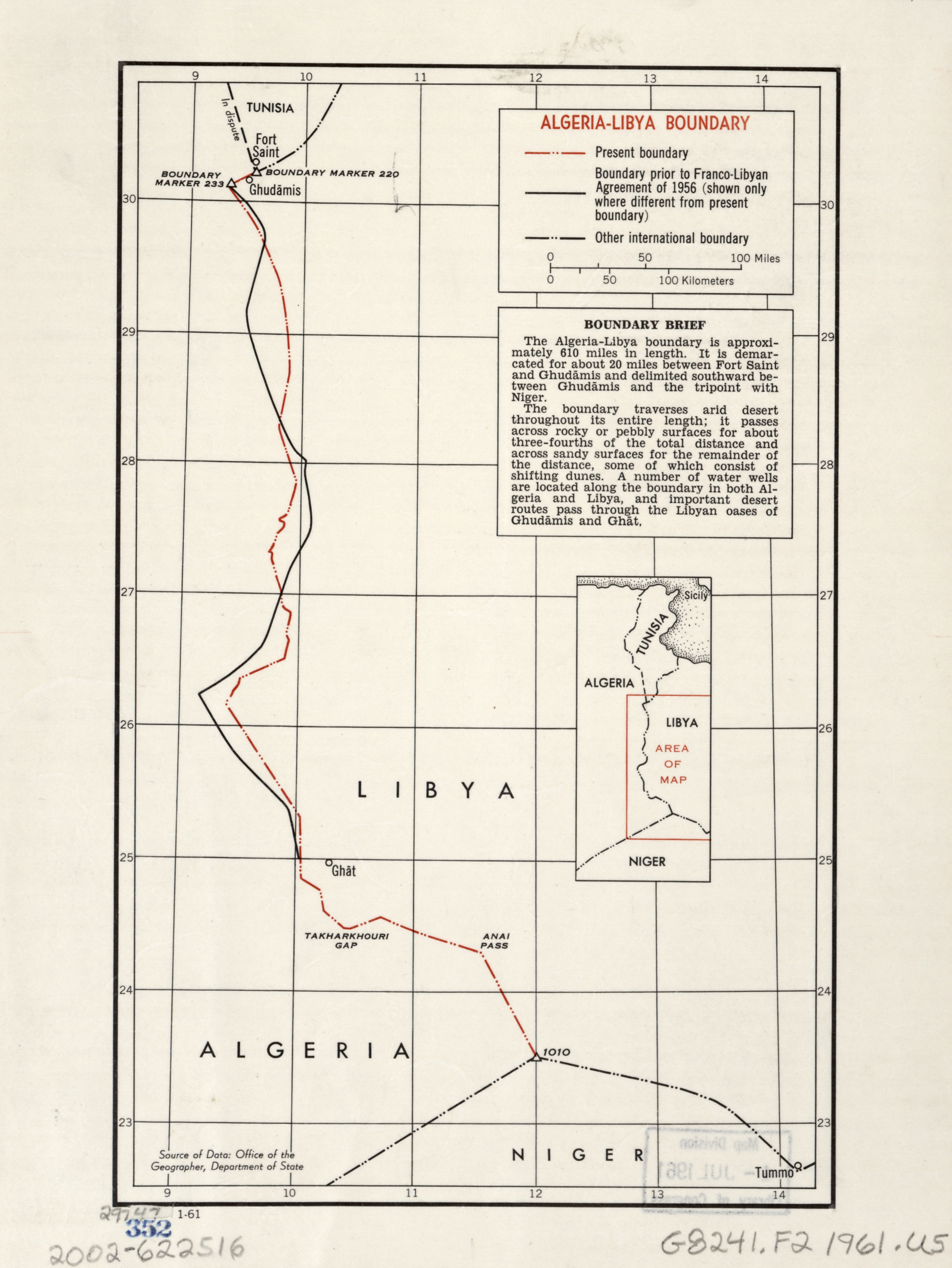
Map of the Algeria-Libya border

The Algeria–Libya border is 989 km (615 mi) in length and runs from the tripoint with Tunisia in the north to the tripoint with Niger in the south.

== History ==
France occupied much of the northern coastal areas of Algeria in the period 1830–47, which had previously been under the nominal control of the Ottoman Empire. For most of the 19th century the coastal region of modern Libya (organised as the Vilayet of Tripolitania) was part of the Ottoman Empire, though with a large degree of de facto autonomy. In September 1911 Italy invaded Tripolitania, and the Treaty of Ouchy was signed the following year by which the Ottomans formally ceded sovereignty over the area to Italy. The Italians organised the newly conquered regions into the colonies of Italian Cyrenaica and Italian Tripolitania and gradually began pushing further south; in 1934 they united the two territories as Italian Libya.

France and Italy signed a treaty on 12 September 1919 which delimited a boundary between Algeria and Libya. During the North African Campaign of the Second World War Italy was defeated and its African colonies were occupied by the Allied powers, with Libya split into British and French zones of occupation. Libya was later granted full independence on 2 December 1951. France, which had long been dissatisfied with aspects of the border, signed a treaty with Libya in 1955-6 which altered part of the border between Ghadames and Ghat, thereby enabling more effective administration. Following a war Algeria gained independence in 1962, and the border became one between two sovereign states.

Relations since independence have largely been cordial, though the border remains generally insecure due to the impact of terrorism and spill-over from the Libyan Civil War.

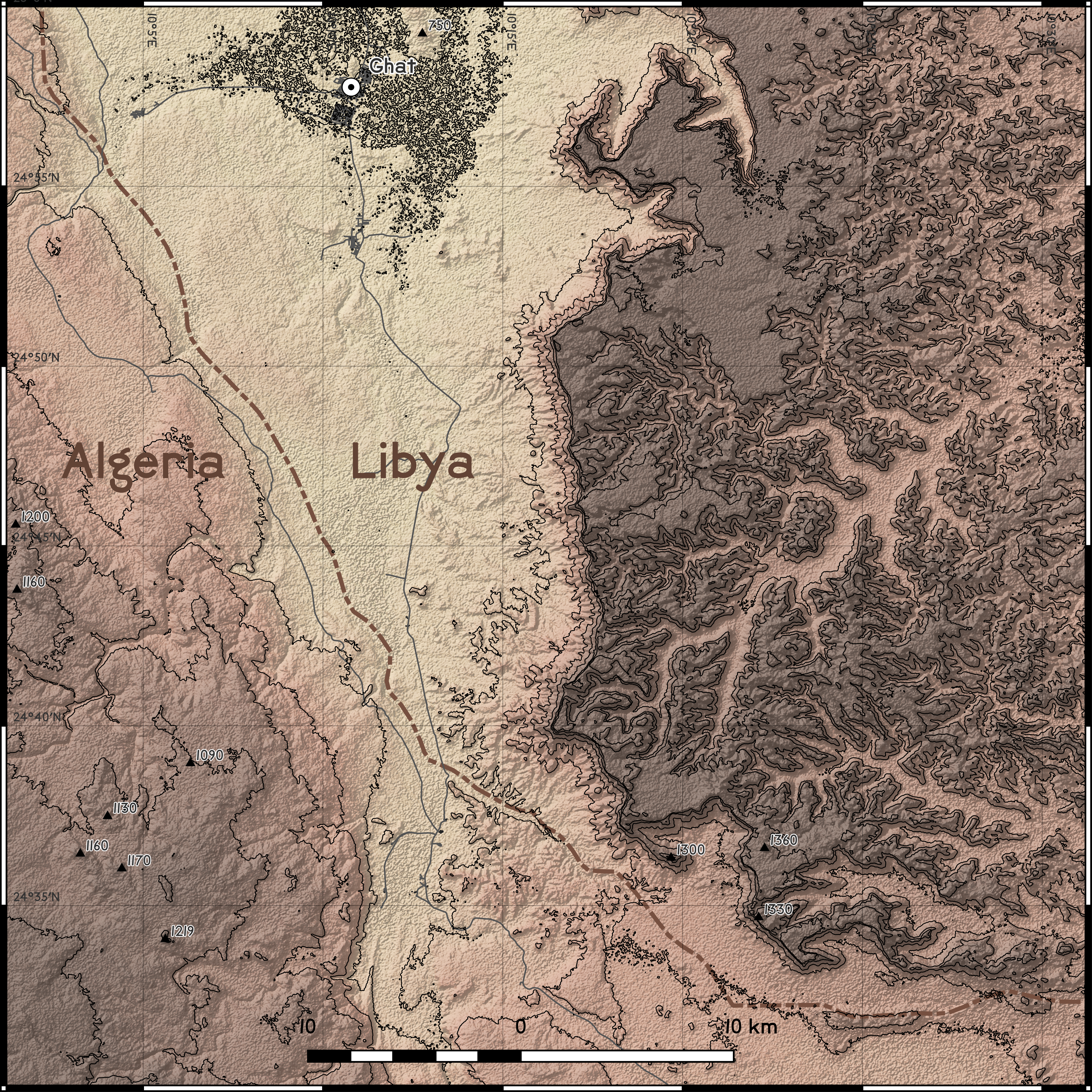
Topographic map of the Algerian-Libyan border at Tin-Alkoum

== Settlements near the border ==
=== Algeria ===
- Debdeb
- In Amenas
- Edjeleh
- Zarzaitine

=== Libya ===
- Ghadames
- Al Birkah
- Ghat

== See also ==
- Algeria–Libya relations
