= Imehrou =

- Village
- Location within Algeria
- Coordinates: 25°48′33″N 8°41′1″E
- Country: Algeria
- Province: Illizi Province
- District: Illizi District
- Commune: Illizi
- Elevation: 691 m (2,267 ft)
- Time zone: UTC+1 (CET)

Imehrou (also known as Imihrou) is a village in the commune of Illizi, in Illizi Province, Algeria. The village is the site of a project to introduce solar energy to Algeria, with 33 households connected to 5 solar power systems.
