= Edjeleh =

- Village
- Location within Algeria
- Coordinates: 27°47′10″N 9°53′31″E
- Country: Algeria
- Province: Illizi Province
- District: In Amenas District
- Commune: In Amenas
- Elevation: 487 m (1,598 ft)
- Time zone: UTC+1 (CET)

Edjeleh is a village in the commune of In Amenas, in In Amenas District, Illizi Province, Algeria, located near the border with Libya. It is the site of a significant oil field.
