= Debdeb =

Border town in Illizi Province, Algeria

Debdeb دبداب
- Commune
- Location of Debdeb Commune within Illizi Province

- Location of Debdeb within Algeria
- Coordinates: 29°58′3″N 9°25′26″E
- Country: Algeria
- Province: Illizi
- District: In Amenas

Government
  - PMA Seats: 7

Area
  - Total: 31,537 km^{2} (12,177 sq mi)

Population (2008)
  - Total: 4,341
  - Density: 0.1376/km^{2} (0.3565/sq mi)
- Time zone: UTC+01 (CET)
- Postal code: 33220
- ONS code: 3303

Debdeb is a border town and commune of In Amenas District, Illizi Province, Algeria, situated on the country's border with Libya. It had a population of 4,341 as of the 2008 census. Located in the middle of the Sahara, Debdeb has a hot desert climate and is connected with the rest of Algeria by the N53 national highway. It was previously a frequent transit point for West African immigrants to Europe.

== Geography and administration ==
The commune consists of seven localities: Debdeb, Aïn Sabri, Fort Saint, Stah, Merixen, Alrar Erg, and Yagous. Its postal code is 33220 and its ONS code is 3303.

Debdeb lies at an altitude of 464 metres (1,522 ft) near the northern edge of the Hamada de Tinrhert, a large rocky area of the Sahara along the Algeria–Libya border. The Grand Erg Oriental, a vast area of sand dunes, lies to the north.

Debdeb borders Libya to the east; it was a frequent transit point for West African immigrants who travelled to Libya in hopes of reaching Europe by crossing the Mediterranean Sea. The influx of immigrants, along with the start of the Second Libyan Civil War, prompted the Algerian government to close the Ghadames–Debdeb border crossing with Libya in 2014. The border crossing was renovated and reopened on 12 December 2023, following the war's end three years prior.

== Climate ==
Debdeb has a hot desert climate (Köppen climate classification BWh), with extremely hot summers and mild winters, and very little precipitation throughout the year.

Climate data for Debdeb
Month	Jan	Feb	Mar	Apr	May	Jun	Jul	Aug	Sep	Oct	Nov	Dec	Year
Mean daily maximum °C (°F)	17.9 (64.2)	20.7 (69.3)	25.7 (78.3)	31.5 (88.7)	36.0 (96.8)	41.5 (106.7)	42.6 (108.7)	41.6 (106.9)	38.2 (100.8)	31.9 (89.4)	24.3 (75.7)	18.9 (66.0)	30.9 (87.6)
Daily mean °C (°F)	10.4 (50.7)	12.7 (54.9)	17.0 (62.6)	22.3 (72.1)	27.2 (81.0)	32.0 (89.6)	32.5 (90.5)	32.0 (89.6)	29.0 (84.2)	23.4 (74.1)	16.8 (62.2)	11.7 (53.1)	22.3 (72.1)
Mean daily minimum °C (°F)	2.9 (37.2)	4.8 (40.6)	8.4 (47.1)	13.2 (55.8)	18.5 (65.3)	22.5 (72.5)	22.4 (72.3)	22.4 (72.3)	19.8 (67.6)	15.0 (59.0)	9.4 (48.9)	4.5 (40.1)	13.7 (56.6)
Average precipitation mm (inches)	4 (0.2)	4 (0.2)	6 (0.2)	4 (0.2)	2 (0.1)	1 (0.0)	0 (0)	0 (0)	1 (0.0)	2 (0.1)	3 (0.1)	3 (0.1)	30 (1.2)
Source: Climate-Data.org

== Demographics ==
The 2008 census recorded a population of 4,341 in Debdeb, up from 3,212 in 1998, and an annual population growth rate of 3.1%--the lowest in the province.

== Education ==
In 2011, 4.0% of the population had a tertiary education, while another 13.2% had completed secondary education. The overall literacy rate was 71.8%: 79.9% among males and 63.0% among females.

== Transportation ==
Debdeb is on the N53 national highway, which leads north to the Libyan town of Ghadames and south to In Amenas.
