= Bordj Omar Driss Airport =

- IATA: none; ICAO: DAAW

Summary
- Airport type: Public
- Serves: Bordj Omar Driss
- Location: Algeria
- Elevation AMSL: 1,490 ft (450 m)
- Coordinates: 28°11′49.75″N 6°50′39.59″E

Map
- Location of Bordj Omar Driss Airport in Algeria

Bordj Omar Driss Airport (ICAO: DAAW) is an airport currently under construction located near Bordj Omar Driss, Illizi, Algeria.

== History ==
On 27 February 2018, El Maouid El Youmi had announced that a study was being prepared fr the construction of a new airport in the Bordj Omar Driss municipality, pending registration at the time. It was placed under the broader construction programme for developing Illizi's aviation infrastructure, including works at Zarzaitine, Tiska, and Takhamalt. Algerian infrastructure and engineer firm, Société Algérienne d’Études d’Infrastructures (SAETI) was involved with the planning of the new airport.

As of satellite imagery from 2023, Bordj Omar Driss Airport is undergoing construction.

== See also ==
- List of airports in Algeria
