= Tihoubar =

- Village and springs
- Location within Algeria
- Coordinates: 25°56′34″N 8°43′41″E
- Country: Algeria
- Province: Illizi
- District: Illizi
- Time zone: UTC+01 (CET)

Tihoubar or Aïne Tihoubar is a settlement and hot spring of 45 degrees Celsius in the Sahara Desert of eastern Algeria, Illizi Province. It is located roughly 300 kilometres (190 mi) by air northeast of Tamanrasset, and about 175 kilometres (109 mi) northwest of Ghat, Libya. It lies in a valley, and the spring is said to bubble "amongst the undergrowth at the foot of a palm tree."
