= Ifni, Algeria =

Ifni
- Village
- Location within Algeria
- Coordinates: 25°46′6″N 7°55′29″E
- Country: Algeria
- Province: Illizi Province
- District: Illizi District
- Commune: Illizi
- Elevation: 853 m (2,799 ft)
- Time zone: UTC+1 (CET)

Ifni is a village in the commune of Illizi, in Illizi Province, Algeria. The village is the site of a project to introduce solar energy to Algeria, with 2 households connected to 15 solar power systems.
