= Tin Fouye Tabankort gas field =

Gas field in Illizi Province, Algeria

Tin Fouye Tabankort
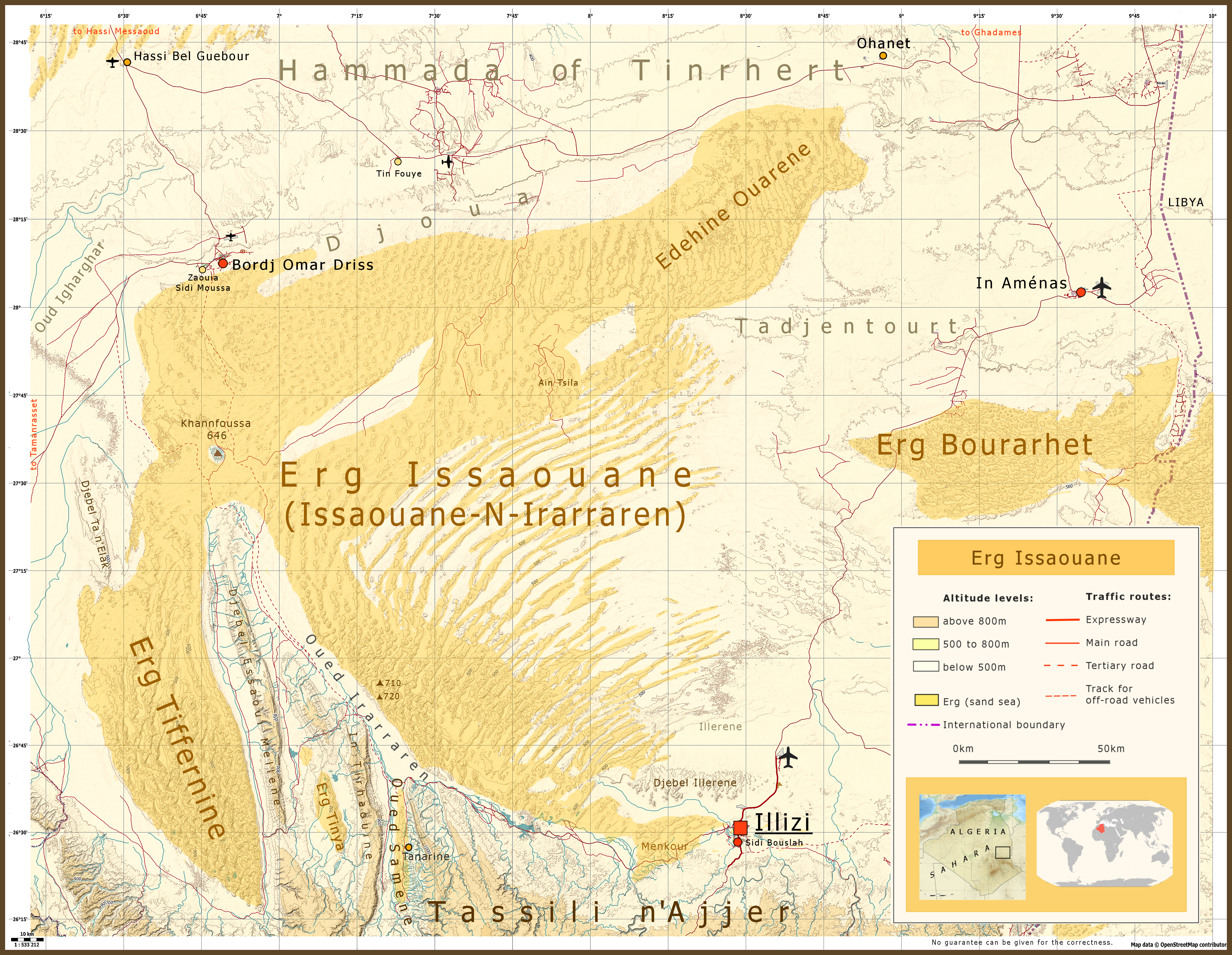
- Tin Fouye Tabankort: top, center left
- Country: Algeria
- Region: Illizi Province
- Offshore/onshore: onshore
- Operator: Sonatrach
- Partners: Total Energies, Repsol

Field history
- Discovery: 1980
- Start of production: 1980

Production
- Estimated gas in place: 146×10^{9} m^{3} 5.1×10^{12} cu ft

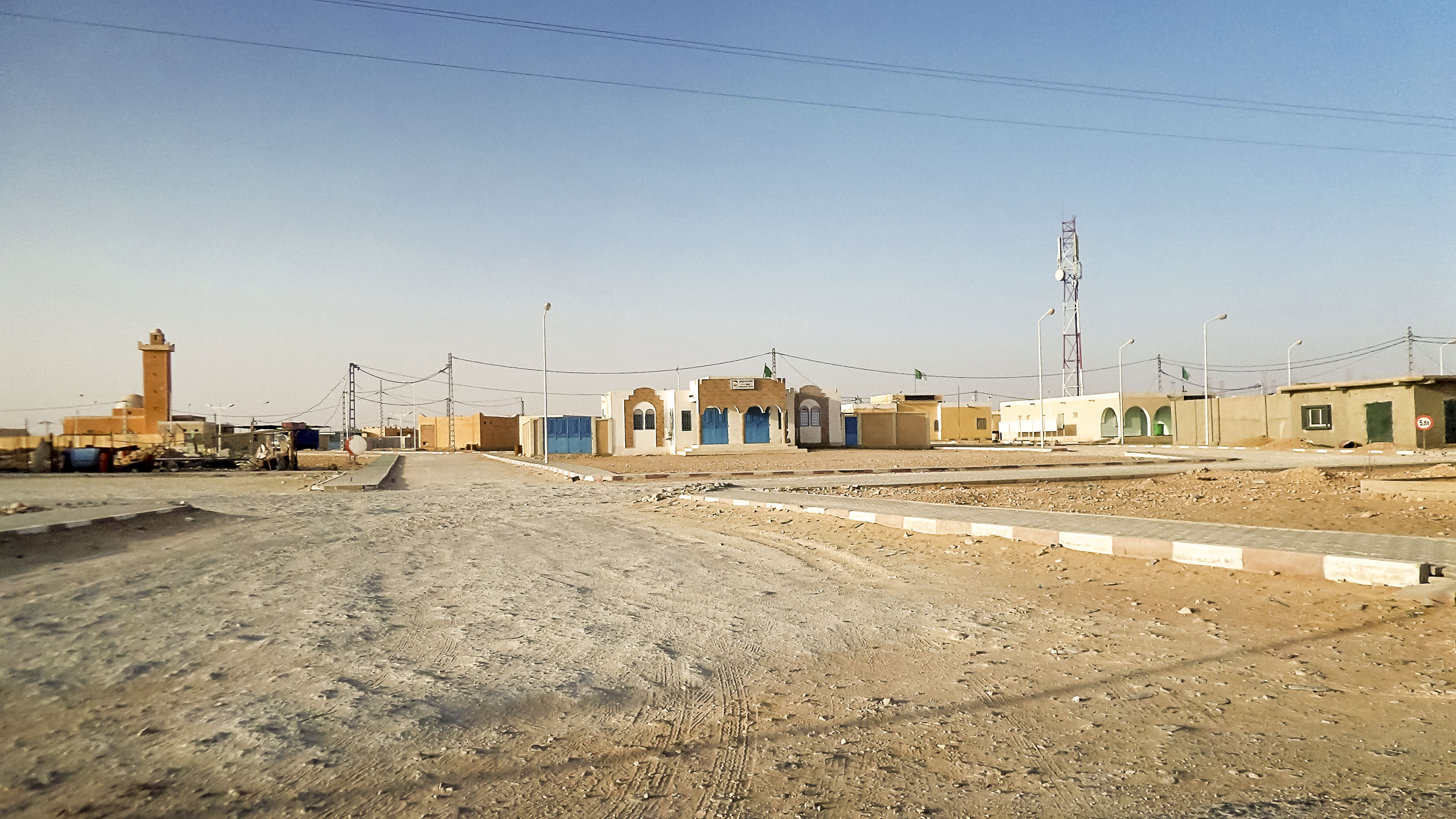
TFT - base camp Tin Fouyé Tabankort

The Tin Fouye Tabankort gas field is a natural gas field located in the Illizi Province. It was discovered in 1980 and developed by Sonatrach. It began production in 1980 and produces natural gas and condensates. The total proven reserves of the Tin Fouye Tabankort gas field are around 5.1 trillion cubic feet (146 billion m^{3}), and production is slated to be around 575 million cubic feet/day (164,000 m^{3}).
