= In Amenas Airport =

In Amenas Airport Aéroport de in Amenas / Zarzaitine
- IATA: IAM; ICAO: DAUZ

Summary
- Airport type: Public / Military
- Operator: EGSA Alger
- Serves: In Amenas, Algeria
- Elevation AMSL: 563 m / 1,847 ft
- Coordinates: 28°03′05″N 9°38′35″E
- Website: egsa-alger.dz/...

Map
- Location of airport in Algeria

Runways
| Direction | Length | | Surface |
| Direction | m | ft | Surface |
|---|---|---|---|
| 05/23 | 3,000 | 9,843 | Asphalt |
| 14/32 | 2,200 | 7,218 | Asphalt |

Statistics (2007)
- Passengers: 145,070
- Aircraft movements: 3,627
- Sources: AIP, EGSA Alger, DAFIF Landings.com

In Amenas Airport, also called Zarzaitine Airport (IATA: IAM, ICAO: DAUZ), is an airport serving In Amenas, a town in the Illizi Province of southeastern Algeria. It is located 4.6 nautical miles (9 km) east of In Aménas.

In 2007, the airport handled 145,070 passengers and had 3,627 aircraft movements.

== Airlines and destinations ==
| Airlines | Destinations |
|---|---|
| Air Algérie | Algiers, Hassi Messaoud, Oran, Ouargla |
