= Ain Tsila gas field =

Gas field in Illizi Province, Algeria

Ain Tsila
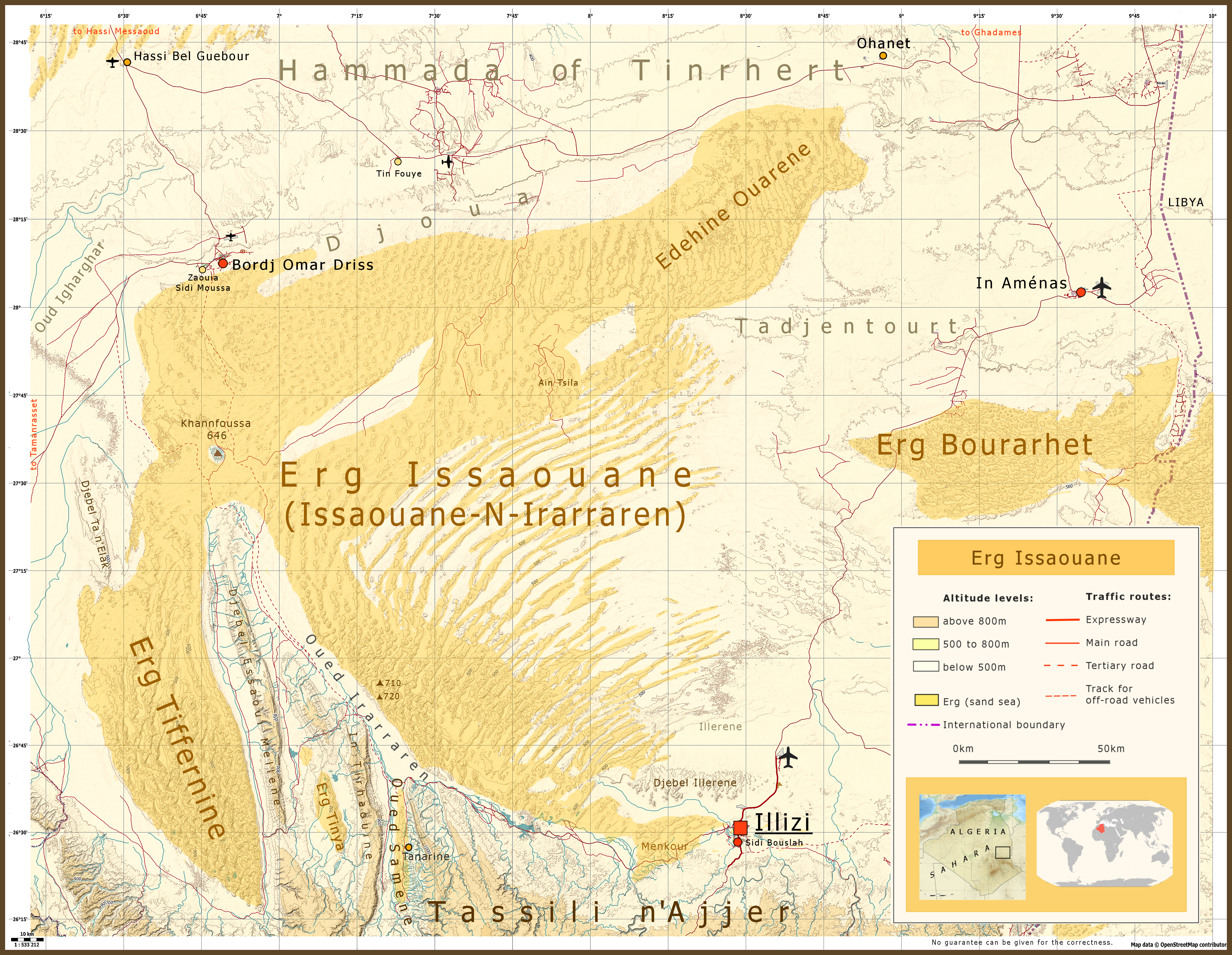
- Ain Tsila in the center
- Country: Algeria
- Region: Illizi Province
- Offshore/onshore: onshore
- Coordinates: 27°42′N 8°0′E
- Operator: Petroceltic International

Field history
- Discovery: 2012
- Start of production: expected 2020-2021

Production
- Estimated gas in place: 289×10^{9} m^{3} 10.1×10^{12} cu ft

The Ain Tsila gas field is a natural gas field located in the Illizi Province. It was discovered in 2012 and developed by Petroceltic International. Production is expected to begin in 2020-21 and will produce natural gas and condensates. The total proven reserves of the Ain Tsila gas field are around 10.1 trillion cubic feet (289 billion m^{3}), although there is no acquired well test data to support this figure. Production is slated to be around 350 million cubic feet/day (10×10^{5}m^{3}).
