= Petroceltic International =

Company based in London, England

Petroceltic International Limited
- Company type: Private company limited by shares
- Industry: Energy
- Founded: 2003
- Headquarters: London, England
- Products: Oil and Gas
- Website: www.petroceltic.com

Petroceltic International is a wholly owned subsidiary of Petroceltic Holdings Limited, a privately owned, UK headquartered, oil and gas company. The group has operations in North Africa and the Black Sea.

== Company development ==
Petroceltic became an oil and gas company in November 2003. In 2004, Petroceltic acquired a licence called 'Isarene' in the Illizi basin of Algeria. In 2006, the company started the first of its exploration wells in Algeria and over the next few years explored the Isarene field with 3D seismic and 13 wells which ultimately led to the discovery and appraisal of the Ain Tsila gas condensate field and the submission of the Field Development Plan. The Ain Tsila field is currently under development. Partners in the field include Sonatrach (the Algerian state energy company) and Enel, the Italian utility.

Petroceltic Holdings is headquartered in London with offices in Algiers, Cairo and Varna.

The company's shares were delisted on the Alternative Investment Market of the London Stock Exchange and the Enterprise Securities Market of the Irish Stock Exchange following a process of examinership, approved by the High Court of Ireland. The company is now a private company owned by Investment Funds under the management of Worldview Capital Management Limited. In 2015, both parties were engaged in a legal tussle concerning claims that the latter was engaged in the a campaign against the company's board of directors.

In April 2021, while Sonatrach cancelled a contract with Sunny Hill Energy to operate a gas field in southern Algeria, the rejected British group is demanding $1 billion in reparations in court. Sonatrach has terminated the partnership contract with Sunny Hill Energy to operate this site which is located 1,100 kilometers south-east of Algiers and in which the British company says it has invested hundreds of millions of dollars. Sunny Hill Energy, which owns a 38.25% stake in the Ain Tsila project, says the oil giant has offered no financial compensation.
