= Tarat, Malaysia =

Human settlement in Malaysia

Tarat Village is a Bidayuh village situated in the district of Serian in of Sarawak, Malaysia. It comprises three sub-villages, namely Tarat Mawang, Tarat Melawi and Tarat Sibala, although the area surrounding Tarat is also considered a part of the constituency. About 90% of the people in Tarat and its surrounding areas are Bidayuh (Land Dayak), a major ethnic group in Sarawak. Chinese, Iban and Malay people are a minority in this village. It is one of the eight Bidayuh majority seats in Sarawak.

Tarat is accessible through the Kuching-Serian highway and situated at the 33rd to 34th mile along the highway.
