= Algeria–Libya relations =

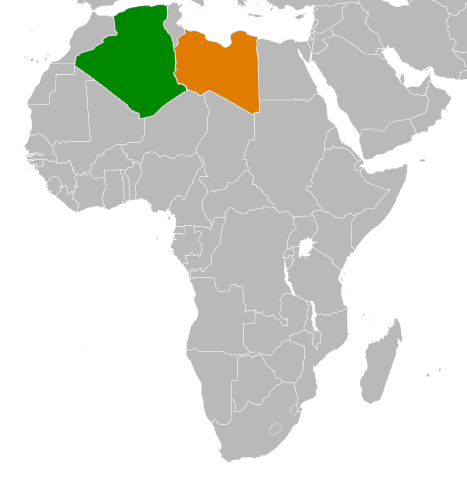

- Algeria: Libya

Diplomatic mission
- Embassy of Algeria in Tripoli, Libya: Embassy of Libya in Algiers, Algeria

Envoy
- Libyan Ambassador to Algeria, Saleh Himma Mohamed Bagda.: Algerian Ambassador to Libya, Abdelkrim Rekibi.

Relations between Algeria and Libya have undergone significant changes over the past decade. The previous tensions between the revolutionary National Transitional Council (NTC) of Libya and the single-party autocracy of Algerian President Abdelaziz Bouteflika are now part of history: Bouteflika resigned in 2019 following widespread protests, and the NTC was succeeded by other governing bodies in Libya.

== History ==
=== 19th Century ===
The Senussi order, which ruled the Kingdom of Libya, has Algerian origin and tied heavily with Algerian identity as its founder Muhammad ibn Ali al-Sanusi was born in Mostaganem during the period of the Regency of Algiers. He was also named after Muhammad ibn Yusuf al-Sanusi who is a venerated Muslim teacher in Tlemcen.

=== Under Muammar Gaddafi ===
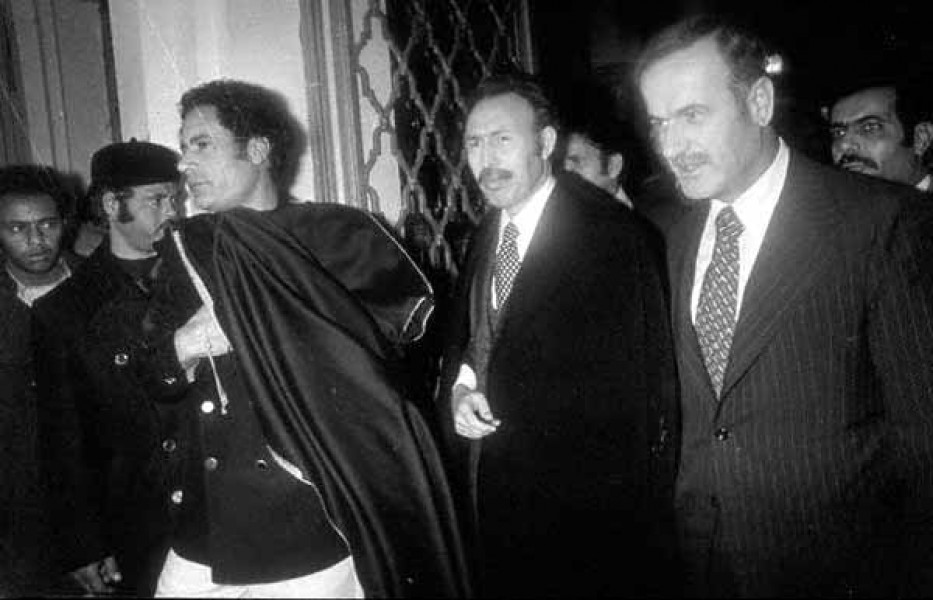
Gaddafi, Boumediene and Assad in Tripoli, 1977

During Muammar Gaddafi's 42-year rule of Libya, bilateral relations were generally amicable. However, strong Libyan support for the Polisario Front in the Western Sahara until 1984, and similarly hardline positions on colonialism and Israel, facilitated 1970s Algerian relations with Libya. Libyan inclinations for full-scale political union obstructed formal political collaboration, as Algeria consistently backed away from such cooperation with its unpredictable neighbor. The Treaty of Oujda (1984) between Libya and Morocco, which represented a response to the Treaty of Fraternity and Concord (1983) between Algeria and Tunisia, temporarily aggravated Algeria-Libya relations by establishing a political divide in the region—Libya and Morocco on one side; and Algeria, Tunisia, and Mauritania on the other.

In 1988, Libya was invited to participate in the Inter-Maghrib commission responsible for developing the Arab Maghreb Union (UMA). The establishment of UMA in February 1989 marked the first formal political or economic collaboration between the two countries. Since then, both Algeria and Libya have experienced significant political changes.

Gaddafi's Libya was accused by Algerian authorities of involvement at the height of Algerian Civil War (1991-2002) that caused a devastating war and the death of 200,000 Algerians. Libya, together with Iran, Saudi Arabia, Sudan and Morocco, had been involved in supporting the Islamist Armed Islamic Group of Algeria as well as other Islamist militant groups.

=== Libyan Civil War ===
During the Libyan Civil War, the anti-Gaddafi National Transitional Council (NTC) of Libya accused Algeria of supporting Gaddafi by allowing him to transfer military equipment and foreign fighters through Algerian territory.

On 8 May 2011, Sadek Bouguettaya, a parliamentary leader and member of the Central Committee of the ruling FLN party, expressed Algeria's unconditional support for Gaddafi while addressing Gaddafi's meeting of Libyan tribes in Tripoli. Later he explained during an interview to the Algerian newspaper Ech-Chourouk that his visit to Libya was for humanitarian purposes and that he was charged with this mission by Abdelaziz Belkhadem, the Secretary-General of the FLN and Minister.

In early June 2011, the NTC began to soften its rhetoric. Ghoga, the NTC's vice chairman, agreed to an interview with Algerian daily Echorouk in which he said, "The Algerian and Libyan peoples are brothers. We are confident that our relations will be stronger in the coming days. We don't want to engage in conflicts with other countries especially with a brotherly country like Algeria. We also wish to see Algeria extend its support for the NTC very shortly."

Despite Ghoga's efforts to mend relations with Algeria, two and a half months later, opposition fighters stormed the Algerian Embassy in Tripoli during Operation Mermaid Dawn, looting and vandalising the building. It was unclear whether the vandals had orders to target the embassy. Algerian Foreign Minister Mourad Medelci complained to United Nations Secretary General Ban Ki-moon over the incident. On 24 August 2011, the Algerian Foreign Ministry again denied the allegations Algiers had offered support to Gaddafi during the war and demanded that the NTC recant on its previous accusations as a condition for the Algerian government to recognise the council.

However, when it emerged that Algeria was allegedly sheltering Gaddafi after he had fled following the NTC takeover of Tripoli, the NTC took a much harsher tone. On 29 August 2011, it said that Algeria sheltering Gaddafi or his family members would be viewed as an "act of aggression". In response, Libyan security forces closed the border with Algeria to prevent any more illicit crossings. On 30 August 2011, Algeria's UN envoy defended the idea of granting refugee status to Gaddafi's wife, his 2 sons, and his daughter. Mourad Benmehidi told BBC that this was a 'rule of hospitality' in the desert region. As for Gaddafi, Algerian President Abdelaziz Bouteflika refused for him to seek asylum in Algeria, with Algerian Foreign Minister Mourad Medelci insisting that Algeria wont become a safe haven for the Libyan dictator. Gaddafi's family was thrown out of Algeria, and by October 2012 had been living in Oman.

On 20 June 2020, Libyan Prime Minister Fayez al-Sarraj met up with Algerian President, Abdelmadjid Tebboune in Algiers to discuss previous political and security developments in Libya and Algeria's efforts in ending the Libyan War. A month later, on 11 July 2020, Algerian Prime Minister, Sabri Boukadoum told Anadolu Agency that Algeria opposes the division in Libya, and that 'Algeria seeks to bring all Libyans together'.

=== Post Civil War ===
On 9 January 2022, Algeria opened a new consulate in Tripoli after eight years of absence.

On 7 October 2025, acting Minister of Foreign Affairs Taher Salem Al-Baour met on with Ibrahim Ayash, the Chargé d’Affaires of the Algerian Embassy in Libya, to discuss the situation of the Libyan and Algerian communities in both countries.
