= Maurice Lelubre =

French geologist (1916–2005)

Maurice Lelubre (1916–2005) was a French geologist who undertook a number of explorations in the Sahara desert. He served as geologist for the Geological Map of Algeria (1949), lecturer at the University of Toulouse (1957), and then professor of geology and petrography. From 1977 until his retirement in 1983, he directed the Laboratory of Geology-Petrology at the Paul Sabatier University of Toulouse. He received the Fontannes Prize from the Société géologique de France (1953).
