= Illizi =

Illizi إيليزي
- city
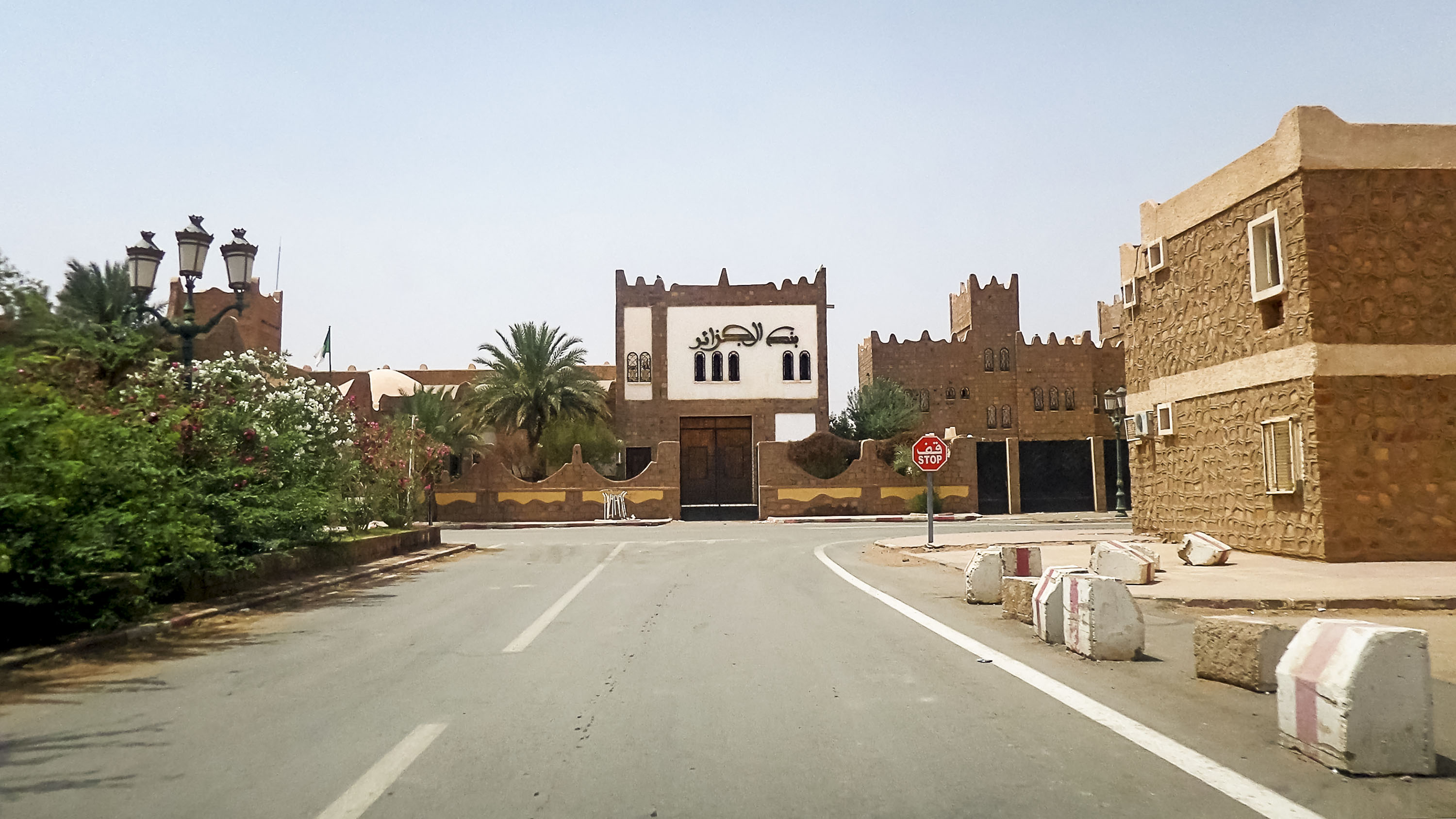
- General aspect of Illizi central quarter

- Location of Illizi Commune within Illizi Province

- Location of Illizi within Algeria
- Coordinates: 26°30′18″N 8°28′56″E
- Country: Algeria
- Province: Illizi Province
- District: Illizi District

Government
  - PMA Seats: 11

Area
  - Total: 75,945 km^{2} (29,323 sq mi)
- Elevation: 567 m (1,860 ft)

Population (2008)
  - Total: 17,252
  - Density: 0.22716/km^{2} (0.58835/sq mi)
- Time zone: UTC+01 (CET)
- Postal code: 33000
- ONS code: 3301

Illizi (Amazigh language: Ilizi) is an Algerian town and commune, coextensive with Illizi District, situated in the south-eastern part of Algeria, and capital of Illizi Province. According to the 2008 census it is the largest commune by population in the province, with a population of 17,252, up from 10,163 in 1998, and an annual population growth rate of 5.5%, the highest in the province. It is one of the gates to the Tassili N'Ajjer National Park with caves and partly enclosed rock shelters containing prehistoric drawings dating from 6000 years BC. There are a hotel and two camping sites, as well as many local tourist agencies. During French colonial rule, the town was called Fort Polignac (1909–1962).

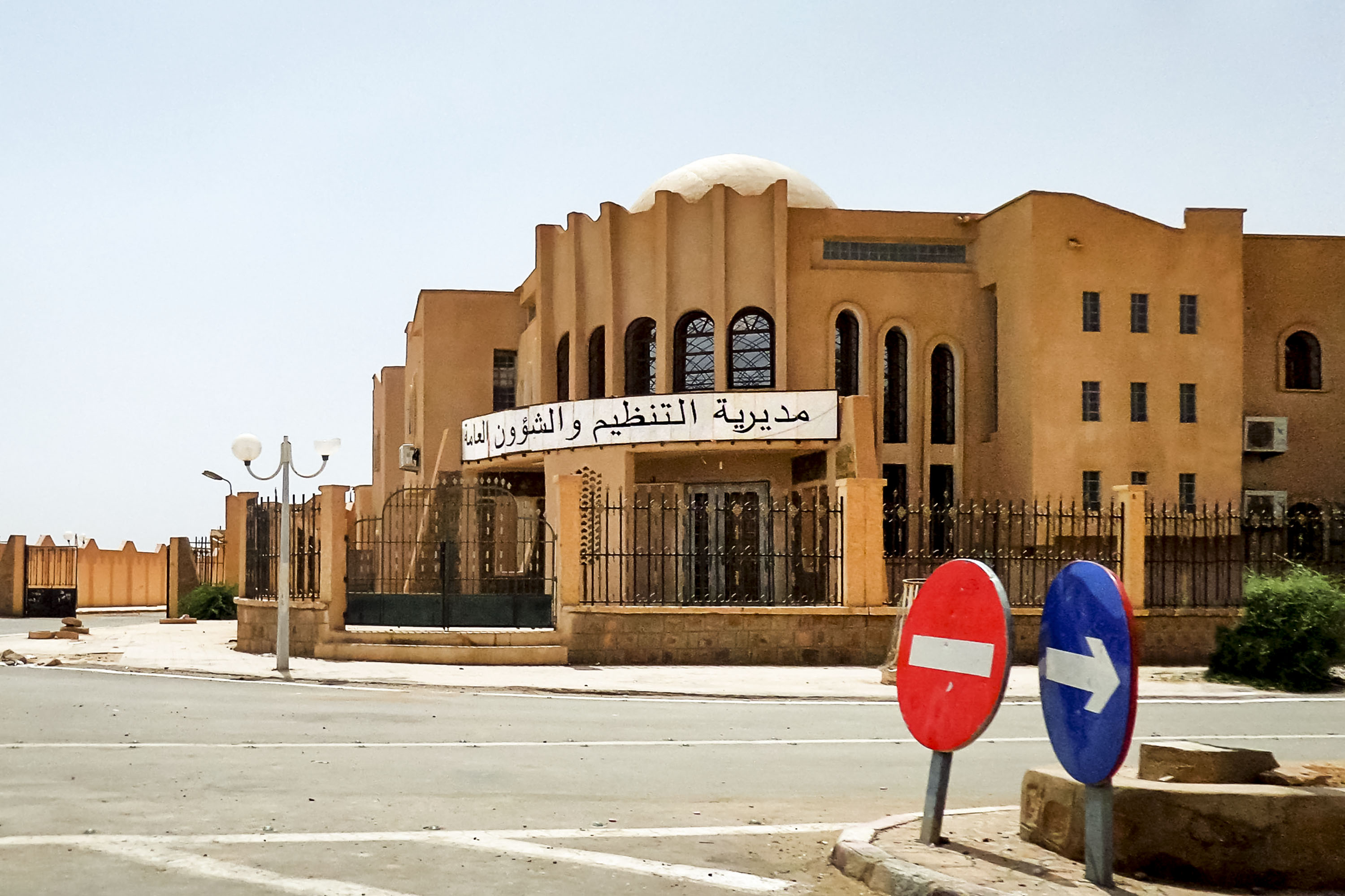
Public Services Directorate of Illizi

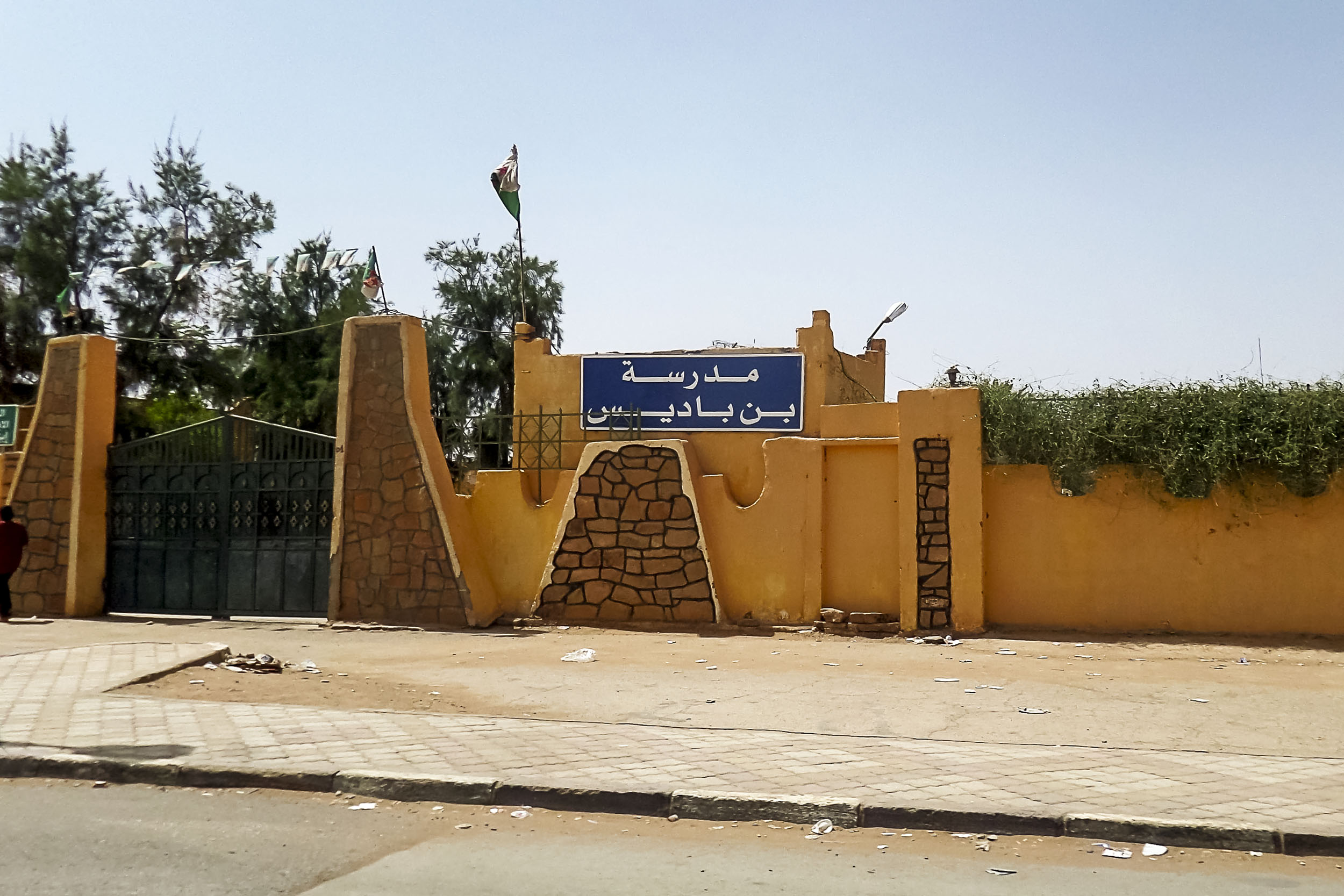
Ibn Badis School Illizi

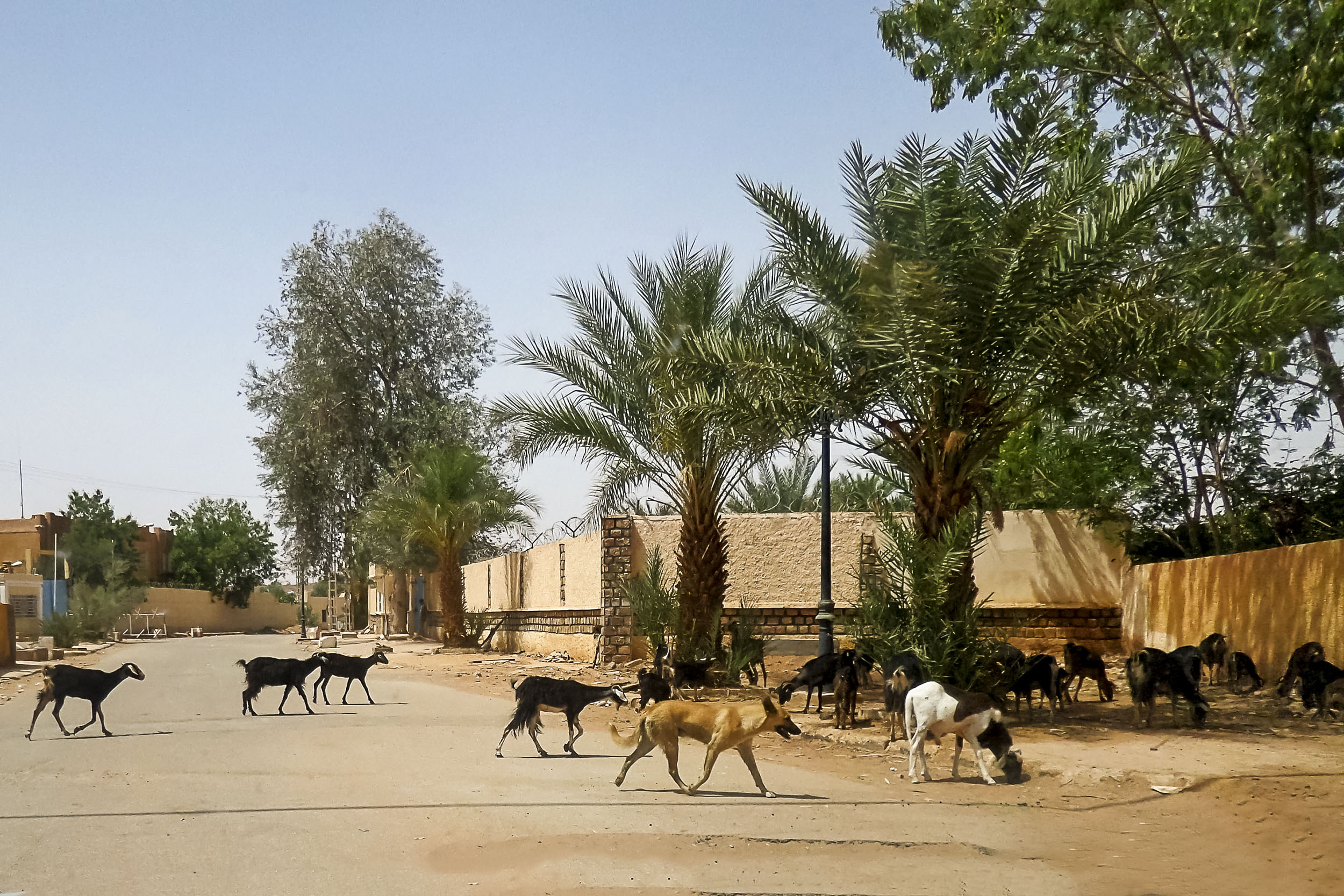
Street scene in a residential area, Illizi

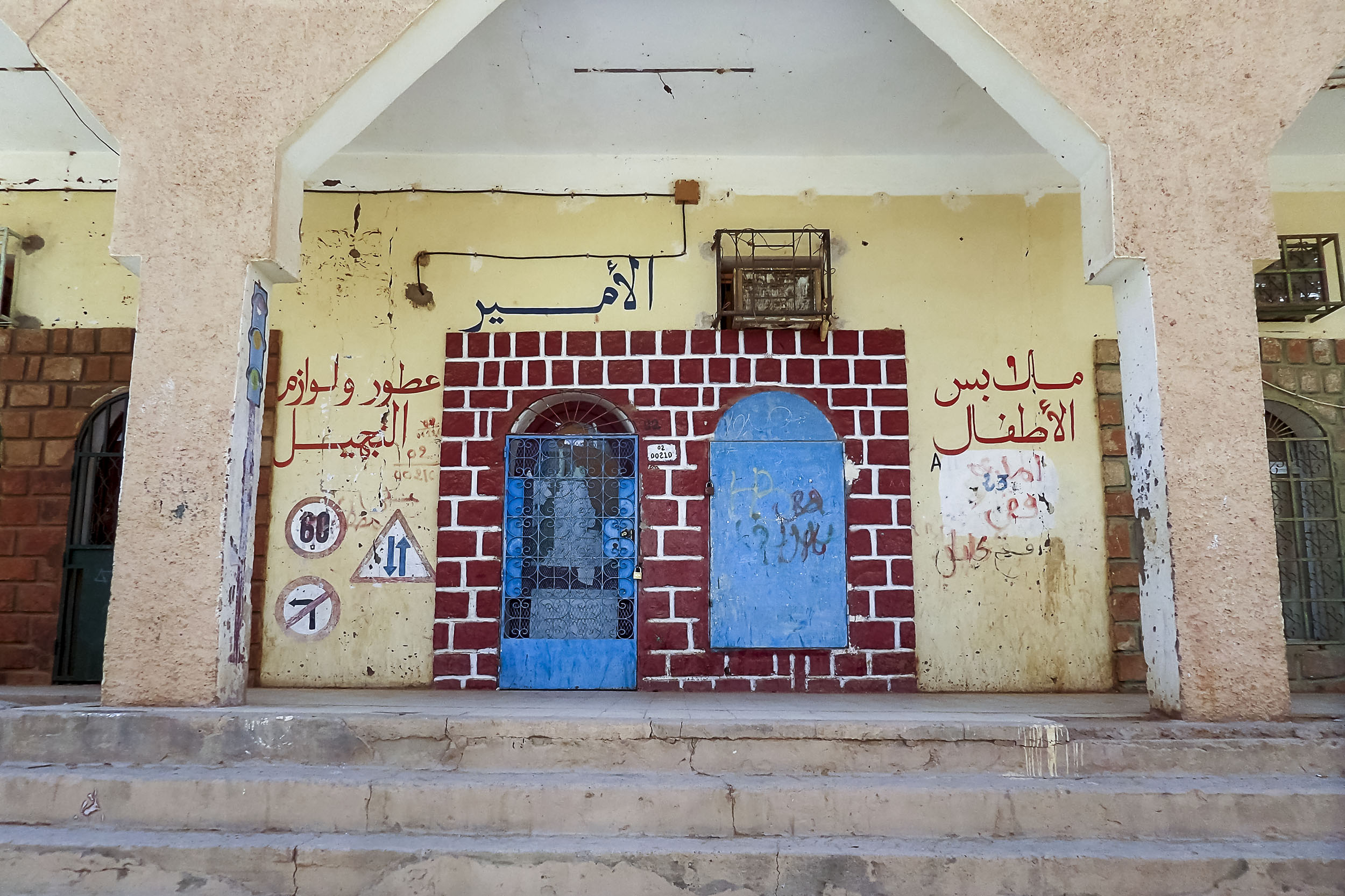
Boutique in Illizi

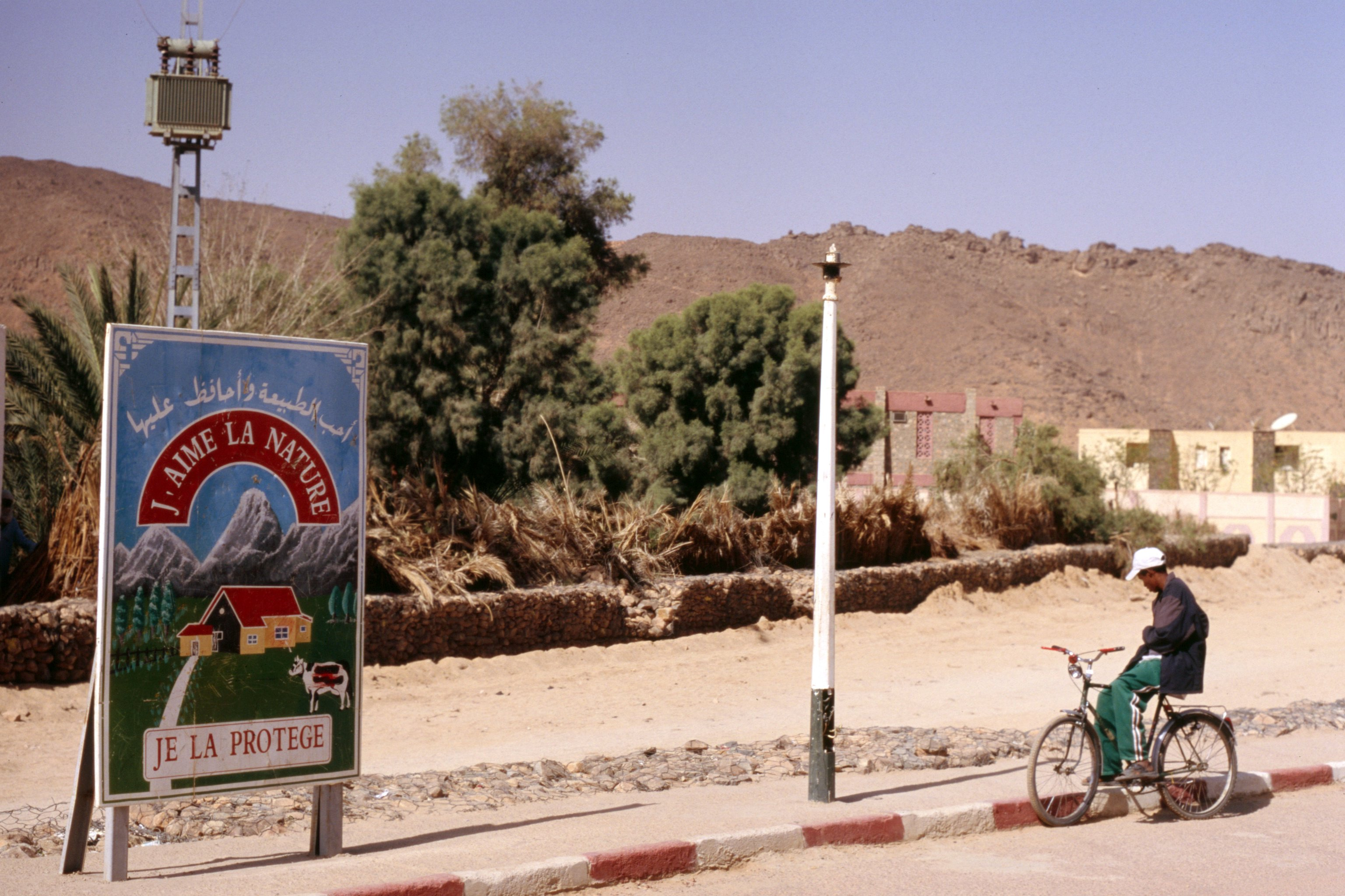
Illizi. The text's translation: "I love Nature, therefore I protect it".

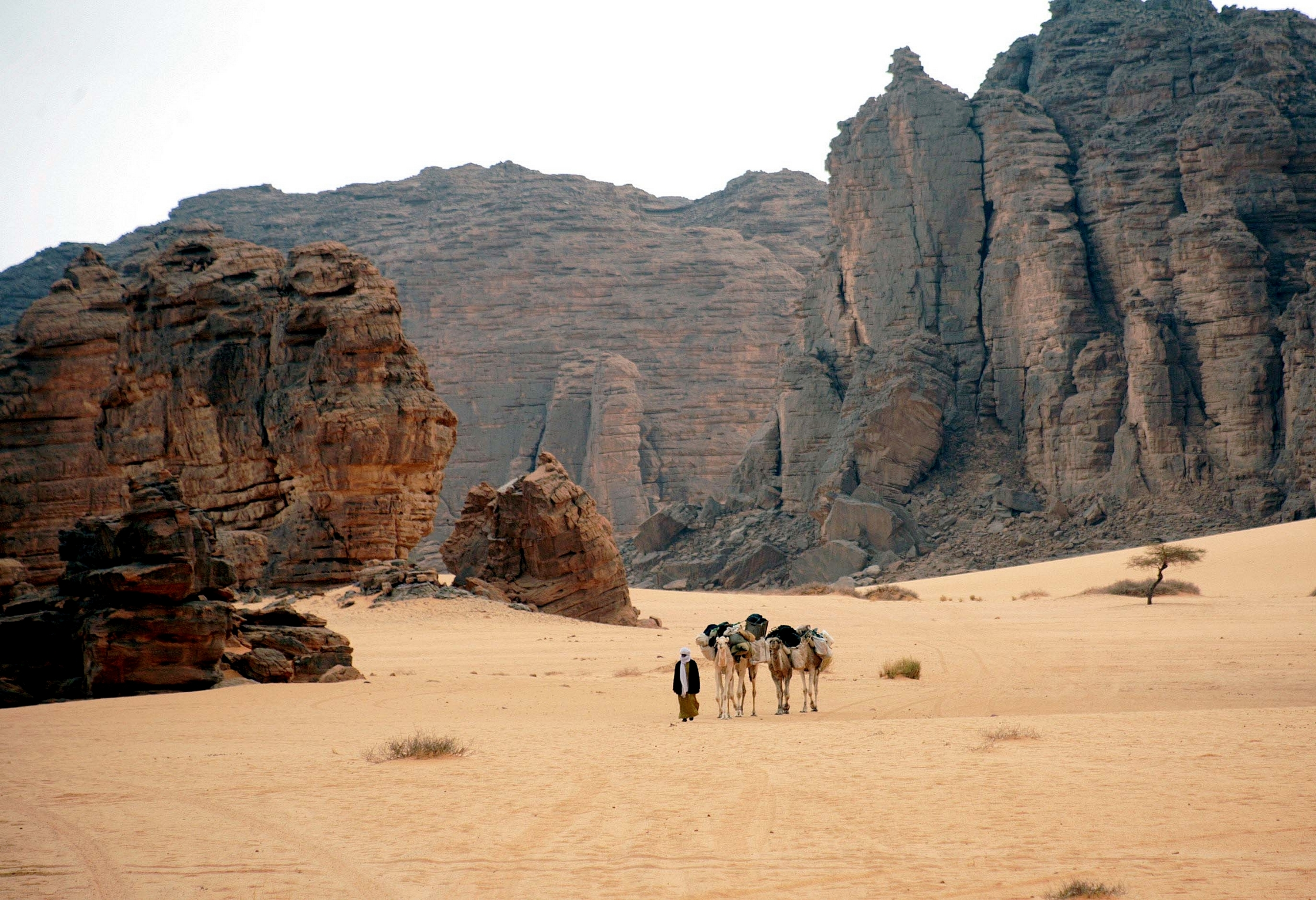
Natural areas in the nearby Tassili n'Ajjer Mountains

== Climate ==
Illizi has a hot desert climate (Köppen climate classification BWh), with long, extremely hot summers and short, very warm winters. The town is virtually rainless throughout the year as the average annual rainfall is around 10 mm (0.39 in), and summers are especially dry. The sky is always clear over Illizi all year long and the relative humidity is very low.

Climate data for Illizi (1991–2020)
Month	Jan	Feb	Mar	Apr	May	Jun	Jul	Aug	Sep	Oct	Nov	Dec	Year
Record high °C (°F)	35.0 (95.0)	38.5 (101.3)	40.5 (104.9)	44.7 (112.5)	45.3 (113.5)	47.7 (117.9)	47.6 (117.7)	46.7 (116.1)	45.7 (114.3)	42.0 (107.6)	38.2 (100.8)	33.5 (92.3)	47.7 (117.9)
Mean daily maximum °C (°F)	20.6 (69.1)	23.4 (74.1)	28.3 (82.9)	33.7 (92.7)	37.8 (100.0)	41.4 (106.5)	42.1 (107.8)	41.4 (106.5)	39.5 (103.1)	34.0 (93.2)	27.2 (81.0)	21.8 (71.2)	32.6 (90.7)
Daily mean °C (°F)	12.6 (54.7)	15.3 (59.5)	20.1 (68.2)	25.4 (77.7)	30.2 (86.4)	33.6 (92.5)	33.9 (93.0)	33.5 (92.3)	31.7 (89.1)	26.3 (79.3)	19.4 (66.9)	14.2 (57.6)	24.7 (76.5)
Mean daily minimum °C (°F)	4.7 (40.5)	7.2 (45.0)	11.9 (53.4)	17.1 (62.8)	22.4 (72.3)	25.7 (78.3)	25.8 (78.4)	25.6 (78.1)	23.9 (75.0)	18.6 (65.5)	11.6 (52.9)	6.6 (43.9)	16.8 (62.2)
Record low °C (°F)	−4.0 (24.8)	−1.9 (28.6)	0.7 (33.3)	5.6 (42.1)	9.1 (48.4)	17.5 (63.5)	19.3 (66.7)	19.0 (66.2)	15.4 (59.7)	9.5 (49.1)	1.7 (35.1)	−2.2 (28.0)	−4.0 (24.8)
Average precipitation mm (inches)	1.8 (0.07)	2.2 (0.09)	2.2 (0.09)	1.4 (0.06)	1.5 (0.06)	2.0 (0.08)	0.0 (0.0)	0.5 (0.02)	1.8 (0.07)	2.5 (0.10)	1.8 (0.07)	1.7 (0.07)	19.4 (0.76)
Average precipitation days (≥ 1.0 mm)	0.3	0.3	0.3	0.4	0.4	0.5	0	0.1	0.5	0.6	0.3	0.4	4.1
Average relative humidity (%)	48	39	33	30	27	27	24	22	25	32	43	42	33
Source 1: NOAA
Source 2: Weatherbase (humidity)

== Transport ==
Illizi lies on the N3 national highway, which leads north to In Amenas and Touggourt and south to Djanet.

The town is served by Takhamalt Airport, with flights to Ghardaïa and Ouargla.

== Economy ==
The commune of Illizi includes five villages generating their own solar energy as part of a project to introduce solar energy to Algeria: Tihahiout, Ifni, Imehrou, Oued Semen, and Tamadjert.

== Education ==
8.4% of the population has a tertiary education (the highest rate in the province), and another 15.7% has completed secondary education. The overall literacy rate is 78.1%, and is 85.2% among males and 69.0% among females.

== Sports ==
The city is home to CSSW Illizi, an amateur side which plays in the south-east group of the Inter-Régions Division, the third tier of the Algerian football pyramid.

== Localities ==
The commune is composed of eight localities:

- Centre Ville (with the suburbs Sidi Bouslah and Takebalt)
- Afara
- Imehrou
- Oued Semen (with the village of Tanarine)
- Aharhar
- Tarat
- Tamadjert
- Fadnoune

== History ==
In July 1903, the French captain Pein came to the Oued Ilezi with a troop and determined that it was an ideal place for a military base: a good waterhole with water at a depth of 50–100 cm, a raised area next to it with a very good defensive position and plenty of pastures and wood in the surrounding area.

In May 1908, Colonel Laperrine, commander of the French Sahara troops, came to the Oued Ilezi and determined the exact location of the planned Polignac fort on a small rocky plateau, a few meters above the course of the river. Construction of the fort then began. It was completed in September 1909.

In the same year, after its completion, the French captain Niéger visited the Kel Iherir-Tuareg in the Oued Iherir, 120 km south of Illizi. He promised the ethnic group that wells would be drilled in the Oued Ilezi the following winter and that their ethnic group would be granted water and land rights there. This is how people from the Kel Iherir became the first inhabitants of the village of Fort Polignac. - In 1957, Fort Polignac had around 1000 inhabitants.

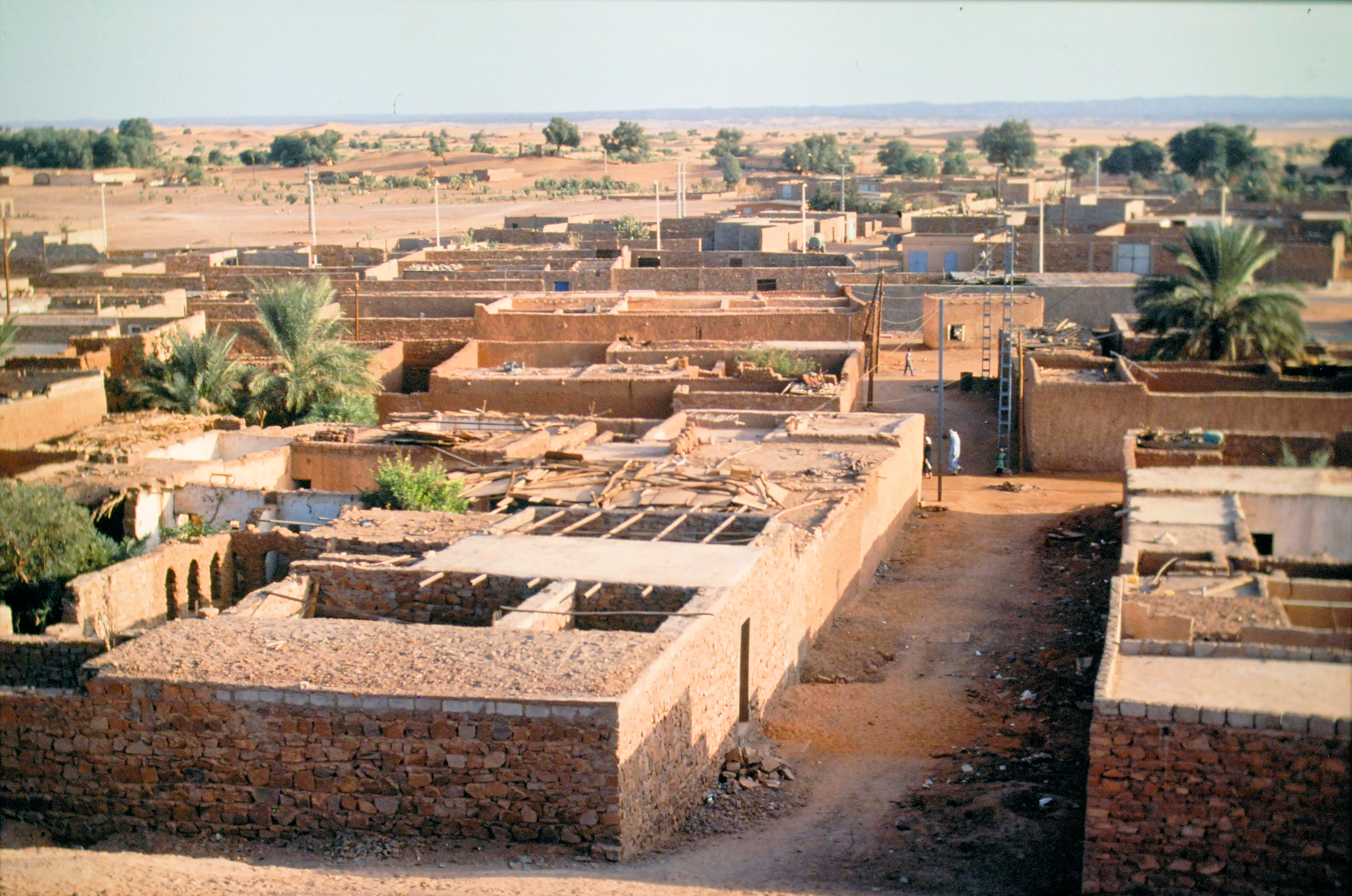
Illizi 1991: Residental quarter

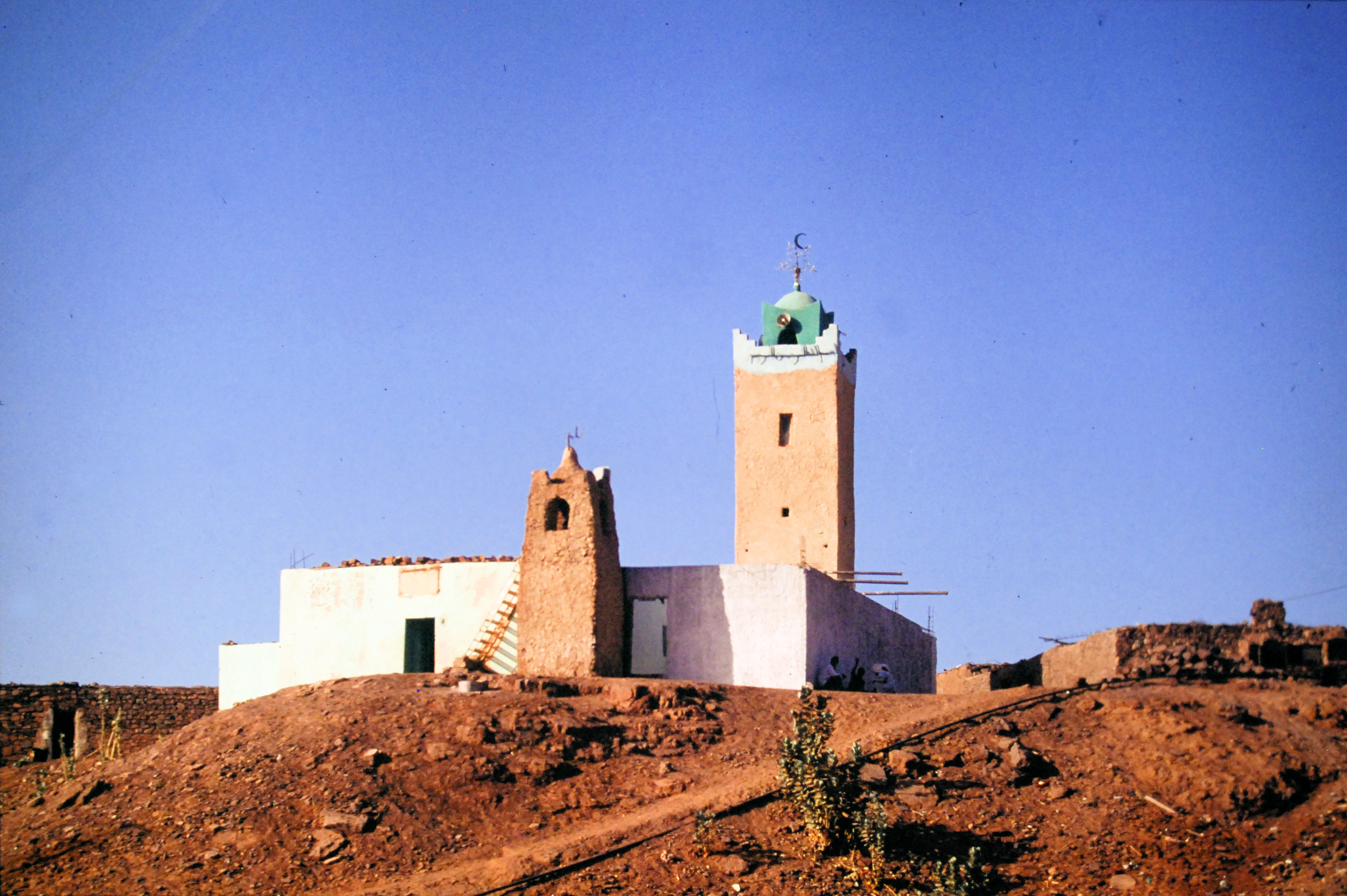
Illizi 1991: Small Mosque on the outskirts

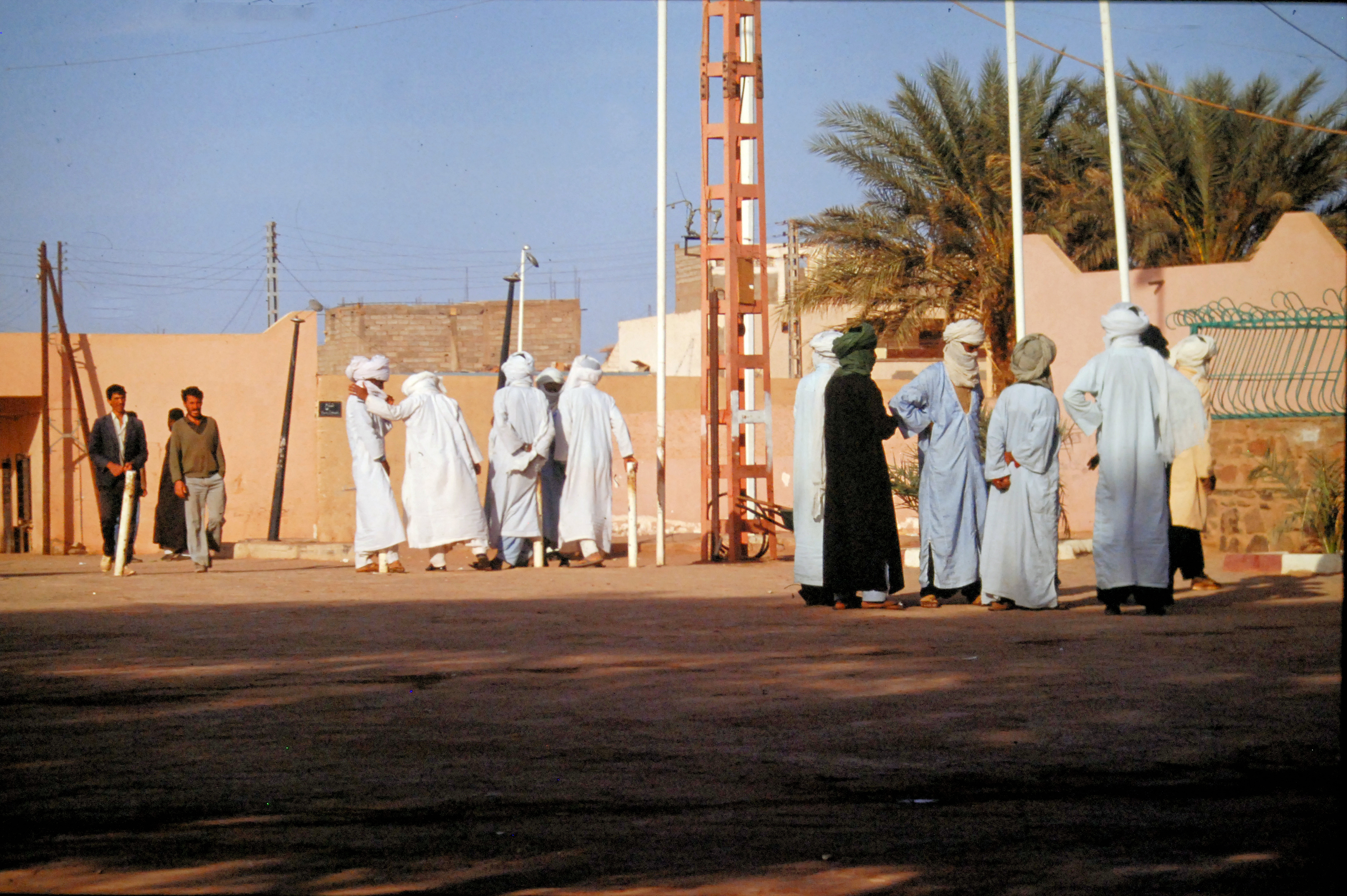
Illizi 1991: Street scene downtown

== See also ==
- Illizi Province
