= In Amenas hostage crisis =

2013 hostage crisis in Algeria

- Part of the Insurgency in the Maghreb (2002–present)
- Location: 27°53′49″N 09°07′37″E; West of In Amenas, Algeria
- Date: 16 January 2013–19 January 2013 (CET – UTC +1)
- Target: International natural gas plant workers
- Attack type: Ambush, siege, hostage crisis
- Weapons: Automatic weapons; Mortars; Anti-aircraft missiles; Explosives
- Deaths: 67 (37 foreign hostages, an Algerian security guard and 29 terrorists)
- Injuries: Unknown
- Perpetrator: Al-Mourabitoun jihadists
- Motive: Opposition against Operation Serval

The In Amenas hostage crisis began on 16 January 2013, when al-Qaeda-linked terrorists affiliated with a brigade led by Mokhtar Belmokhtar took expat hostages at the Tigantourine gas facility near In Amenas, Algeria. One of Belmokhtar's senior lieutenants, Abdul al Nigeri, led the attack and was among the terrorists killed. After four days, the Algerian special forces raided the site, in an effort to free the hostages.

At least 39 foreign hostages were killed along with an Algerian security guard, although the true figure is not known, as were 29 terrorists. A total of 685 Algerian workers and 107 foreigners were freed. Three terrorists were captured.

It was one of many attacks in the Maghreb carried out by Islamist groups since 2002. There is evidence that the threat was increasing prior to this incident. There is also evidence of a direct threat to expat workers.

== Attack ==
The most detailed publicly available information about the attack comes from the transcript of the eyewitness evidence given to HM Coroner in London. Another source of information is the website for the In Amenas inquest. Tigantourine gas facility is located about 40 kilometres (25 mi) south-west of In Amenas, close to the Libyan border and about 1,300 kilometres (810 mi) south-east of Algeria's capital city, Algiers. The Algerian state oil company Sonatrach operates the gas field jointly with the British firm BP and the Norwegian firm Statoil. It supplies 10% of Algeria's natural gas production.

Map of the In Amenas facility

The crisis began in the early morning of 16 January 2013. Around 32 Islamist terrorists in 4 to 5 vehicles, who had entered Algeria from Libya and northern Mali, attacked a bus transporting employees from a natural gas plant near the town of In Amenas in far eastern Algeria, about 60 kilometres (37 mi) west of the border with Libya, killing a number of the employees. At 5:40 AM, terrorist gunmen in Toyota Land Cruisers stormed the Base de Vie (accommodation block). The terrorists also attacked the Central Processing Facility (CPF) itself. The terrorists rigged the plant with explosives, and threatened a "tragic end" should attempts be made to free the captives.

As the assault began on a bus carrying expats, a guard named Mohamed Lamine Lahmar succeeded in activating a plant-wide alarm, warning the whole site that a terrorist attack was in progress. Lahmar's actions made it possible for some people to hide and for others to shut down essential processes of the site and possibly prevent its destruction from explosives detonation. Lahmar was shot to death by the terrorists immediately afterward. In addition, a British citizen was also killed and at least seven others were injured during the initial capture of hostages and assault on the plant.

For a number of hours, the gunmen hunted door-to-door for foreigners. They dragged people from their hiding places, beating some who did not cooperate, and shooting others as they tried to run away. Some foreigners had their hands bound behind their backs, and some had their mouths taped. The gunmen affixed bombs to some of the captives. Some foreigners were helped by local Algerians, who helped them hide.

Subsequently, Algerian security forces surrounded the facility. At midday local time on 17 January the terrorists at Base de Vie decided to drive to meet those in the CPF. They loaded hostages into 6 vehicles and drove out onto the road. During the 3 km journey they were attacked by the Algerian military and all 6 vehicles were stopped. 4 were blown up and 2 were riddled with bullets. See the transcript of evidence at the London Inquest. A few hostages managed to escape, including some Britons who helped other hostages. Some expats who were hiding in the CPF escaped on 18 January after the terrorists spotted them and opened fire. They walked for miles across the desert before they were rescued.

On 18 January in the afternoon the terrorists detonated a bomb at the CPF murdering some hostages and the military attacked the CPF bringing the siege to an end.

=== Perpetrators ===
An al-Qaeda-affiliated group, known variously as both Katibat al-Mulathameen ('The Masked Brigade') and al-Muwaqqi‘ūn bi-d-Dimā' (Arabic: الموقعون بالدماء 'Those who Sign with Blood'), perpetrated the attack. The terrorists were under the command of Mokhtar Belmokhtar, known also as Khalid Abu al-Abbas.

Belmokhtar, a veteran of Algeria's civil war and the Soviet–Afghan War and dubbed "The Uncatchable" by French intelligence, was a senior commander in al-Qaeda's local branch before deciding to form his own armed Islamist group late in 2012 after an apparent fallout with other terrorist leaders. Despite the split, his fighters remain loyal to al-Qaeda, a fact mentioned in their communication with the media after the initial assault.

The Algerian Prime Minister said 32 terrorists were involved in the attack, and that three were Algerian while the rest were made up of eight nationalities, including 11 Tunisians, 2 Canadians, plus Egyptian, Malian, Nigerian, and Mauritanians. An Algerian news website had reported that three Egyptians, two Algerians, two Tunisians, two Libyans, one Mali national, and one French national were among the attackers, but the French Minister of the Interior Manuel Valls disputed the presence of a French national among the attackers.

Initially, Abdelmalek Sellal stated there was at least one Canadian dead among the hostage-takers, but did not identify him. He later identified the Canadian man only as "Chedad", and that "Chedad" had co-ordinated and headed the attack; survivors had described a young hostage-taker with fair skin, blond hair, and blue or green eyes, who spoke in perfect North American English. This led to intense media speculation in Canada, and the story quickly became a daily headline for several weeks. The two Canadian attackers' remains were later identified as those of as Ali Medlej, 24, and Xris Katsiroubas, 22, two friends, both of London, Ontario. The two along with a third friend, 24-year-old Aaron Yoon, also from London, traveled to Mauritania in 2011 to study Islam and the Arabic language.

All three were born in Canada, and attended London South Collegiate Institute. Medlej was raised Muslim; Katsiroubas, a Greek-Canadian, and Yoon, a Korean-Canadian, converted to Islam from Greek Orthodox and Catholic, respectively, during their high school years. At some point in late 2011, Yoon became separated from Medlej and Katsiroubas. In December 2011, in Mauritania, Yoon was arrested, charged, and convicted of terrorism, and sentenced to 18 months in prison, more than a year before Medlej and Katsiroubas staged the attack in Algeria. Yoon has maintained his innocence. In 2012, he was visited by an official from Amnesty International, but requested that the circumstances of his arrest and detention remain confidential. The Canadian Broadcasting Corporation reported that Yoon was also visited by a Canadian government official in 2012. Yoon's family was unaware of his detention until more than a month after the hostage crisis, believing he was still studying Islam and the Arabic language.

Yoon was briefly interviewed by the CBC in early 2013, via cellphone, while a group of inmates surrounded him to protect him from the guards and other inmates. CBC News reported 9 May 2013 that at least one among Medlej and Katsiroubas Canadian militants worked at the plant.[26] Yoon was released from prison in July 2013, and subsequently arrived at Toronto's Pearson International Airport; the Canadian authorities are not expected to lay any charges against him. Residents of London, both known and unknown to the trio, have expressed shock and disbelief at their deaths and the circumstances of their deaths. Medlej was variously described by high school friends as a good student who "got high marks but would hide it from his peers", played high school football, was loud, funny, a "wannabe thug", "kind of an ass sometimes, depending who he was with", a "good guy who stood up for a friend (who was being picked on)", and would on occasion slam his fist against a locker in frustration. Friends said Medlej was not very serious about his Muslim faith, saying that he would drink alcohol and smoke. Katsiroubas was described by friends as being seriously invested in his faith, devoutly attending prayers at the mosque; Yoon has been described as private on the subject of his conversion to Islam, and uninvested in his schoolwork, until his conversion to Islam apparently provoked "academic curiosity" within him.

On 19 January, Algerian state media announced that 11 of the hostage-takers were killed after a military offensive which ended the siege. Seven hostages were executed by the perpetrators during the offensive.

Algeria's Prime Minister Abdelmalek Sellal said on 21 January that 29 of the attackers had been killed and 3 captured alive. The New York Times reported that one of the captured attackers said the Egyptians involved in the attack were also involved in the 2012 Benghazi attack.

Libyan hardline Islamist sources declared that the kidnappers had logistical support from Islamists in Libya, such as aiding the media to contact the terrorists, while local Algerian outlets like Numidia News or TSA said that the attackers wore Libyan uniforms, had Libyan weapons and vehicles.

== Demands ==
The terrorists demanded an end to French military operations against Islamists in northern Mali, in return for the safety of the hostages. A spokesman claiming to represent the "Masked Brigade" (or al-Mulathameen Brigade) said the hostage seizure was a response to Algeria's opening of its airspace to French warplanes that bombed Mali's civilians five days prior. Another report mentioned a demand for the release of Aafia Siddiqui and Omar Abdel-Rahman, both held in American prisons on terrorism-related convictions. Other reports suggested the hostage-takers demanded the release of about 100 Islamist prisoners held in Algeria. They also demanded safe passage to Northern Mali and ransom for their expat hostages.

== Hostages ==
According to U.S. officials, 132 foreign nationals were taken hostage. In all, more than 800 people were taken hostage. According to the eyewitness accounts at the London Inquest the terrorists were only interested in expats and did not tie up any Algerian Nationals. A statement released by the Islamist group to a Mauritanian news agency said they had 41 foreign nationals. Five were reportedly being held at the gas facility, and the rest at a nearby housing unit. The number included 13 Norwegians (4 of whom escaped to a nearby military camp), 7 U.S. citizens, 5 Japanese, 1 Irish, as well as nationals from France, Romania, and the United Kingdom. France 24 broadcast parts of a phone conversation with a French hostage, who said he was being held along with British, Japanese, Filipino, and Malaysian nationals.

On 17 January 2013, one Algerian security official told the Associated Press that at least 20 foreigners had escaped. Algeria's private Ennahar TV channel cited 15 foreign hostages, including 2 Japanese, a French couple and the sole Irish national, as having escaped or been freed. Earlier, the Algeria Press Service news agency reported that some 30 Algerian workers managed to free themselves.

According to U.S. officials, 100 of the 132 foreign nationals had either escaped or been set free by mid-day 18 January. The same reports stated that 500 Algerians had been rescued as of 18 January. One American worker was also confirmed dead on 18 January.

=== Deaths ===
On 19 January, 11 terrorists and 7 hostages were killed in a final assault to end the standoff. In addition, 16 foreign hostages were freed, including 2 Americans, 2 Germans, and 1 Portuguese.

One Algerian hostage (a security guard) and 39 foreign hostages from nine different countries were killed during the attack. The nationality breakdown of the dead hostages, as of 25 January 2013, was as follows:

#	Country	Names	Notes
10	Japan	Tadanori Aratani, 66 of Tokyo; Rokuro Fuchida, 64 of Fujisawa; Yasuji Goto, 59; Fumihiro Ito, 59 of Minamisanriku; Keisuke Kawabata, 49; Satoshi Kiyama, 29 of Kumamoto; Hidemi Maekawa, 60; Bunshiro Naito, 44 of Toyohashi; Hiroaki Ogata, 57; and; Takashi Yamada, 72.	
8	Philippines	Angelito Manaois Jr Cesar Laluan Jon Jon Falogm Julius Madrid of Laguna; Silvino Imanil Raffy Edubane Iluminado Santiago	Maintenance
6	United Kingdom	Garry Barlow, 49 of Liverpool; Carson Bilsland, 46 of Bridge of Cally, Perthshire, Scotland; Sebastian John, 26 of Gamston, Rushcliffe; Steve Green, 47 of Fleet, Hampshire; Paul Morgan, 46 of Liverpool; and; Kenneth Whiteside, 59 of Glenrothes, Fife, Scotland.	
5	Norway	Tore Bech, 58 of Bergen; Hans M. Bjone, 55 of Brandbu; Victor Sneberg, 56 of Sandnes; Thomas Snekkevik, 35 of Austrheim; and; Alf Vik, 43 of Grimstad.	
3	United States	Frederick Buttacio, 58 of Katy, Texas; Victor Lynn Lovelady, 58 of Nederland, Texas; and; Gordon Lee Rowan, 58 of Sumpter, Oregon.	
2	Malaysia	Chong Chung Ngen, 55, of Ipoh, Perak; and; Tan Ping Wee, 48 of Port Dickson, Negeri Sembilan.	
2	Romania	Mihail Bucur, 40 of Ploiești; and; Tiberiu Ionuţ Costache, 36 of Bărcăneşti, Prahova.	
1	Algeria	Mohamed Lamine Lahmar	Security guard
1	Colombia	Carlos Estrada, of Bogotá.	Lived in Chelsea, London. BP Vice President for North Africa.
1	France	Yann Desjeux, 52 of Anglet.	

== Algerian rescue operation ==
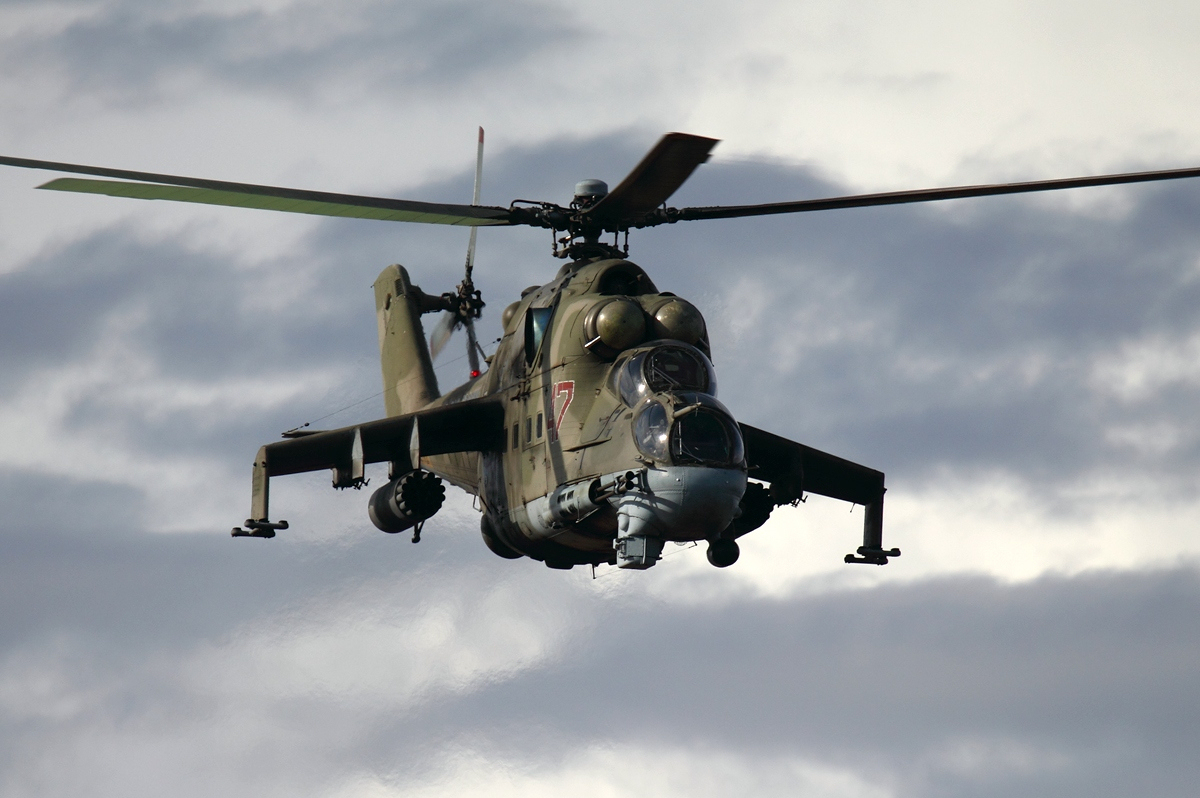
Russian-built Mi-24 gunship of the type used for the rescue attempt.

Minister of Interior Dahou Ould Kablia said the Algerian government would not "respond to the demands of terrorists", and would not negotiate with the hostage takers.

On the afternoon of 17 January 2013, the Algerian Special Intervention Group began an assault on the complex using helicopter gunships and heavy weapons. Algerian commanders explained they launched the assault because the gunmen had demanded to be allowed to take the hostages abroad. The Mauritanian news agency ANI said the assault came while the terrorists were attempting to move hostages by vehicle. An Irish engineer who survived is reported as having said he saw four trucks of hostages being blown up by the Algerian forces. Hostages in two other SUVs were freed by the Algerian forces.

Hostages who escaped from the convoy of 6 vehicles which left the Base de Vie heading for the Central Processing plant do not accept the Algerian Government's account. They told HM Coroner that the military did not attack the Base deVie. Instead they attacked the vehicles carrying hostages and terrorists. A few Britons and Philippine hostages survived by chance when the vehicles in which they were being carried blew up or were overturned. See the transcript.

An Algerian security source said that 30 hostages and 11 terrorists were killed during the raid, which was reported as lasting eight hours. According to the ANI, terrorists claimed that 34 of the hostages and 14 of the Islamists were killed in this initial attack. According to a kidnapper who spoke with the agency, seven hostages were still being held – three Belgians, two Americans, one Japanese, and one British citizen. An Algerian security source earlier confirmed that about 25 foreign hostages had escaped the compound. At least 180 Algerian workers had either escaped the complex or been freed, according to local sources, with a number of others still remaining inside.

Several Western officials expressed discontent with Algeria's failure to minimize casualties, while Japan criticized Algeria for failing to heed Japan's earlier request to "put human lives first and asked Algeria to strictly refrain".

Analysts say Algeria's lack of consultation fit in with a general pattern of acting independently, its policy of no negotiation with terrorists, and, according to Anouar Boukhars of the Carnegie Endowment for International Peace, that "Algerians are jealous of their sovereignty".

Algeria's prime minister Abdelmalek Sellal in a press conference on 21 January praised the decision by Algerian special forces to storm the site, adding that the aim of the kidnappers was to "blow up the gas plant". He stressed that "The terrorists also shot some of the hostages in the head, killing them".

== International impact ==
- Canada: The Canadian government said "Canada condemns in the strongest possible terms this deplorable and cowardly attack and all terrorist groups which seek to create and perpetuate insecurity in the Sahel countries of West Africa".
- Colombia: The Colombian government confirmed the death of Carlos Estrada, BP vice-president for Northern Africa, who had worked for the company for more than 18 years. Estrada was at the time a resident of the United Kingdom.
- France: French officials confirmed that one French citizen was killed. France defended Algeria's handling of the crisis.
- Ireland: The Minister for Foreign Affairs welcomed the news that an Irish engineer who was taken hostage was safe. The Tánaiste said his "thoughts are with the other oil-field workers who are caught up in this terrible situation".
- Japan: There were 17 Japanese hostages, of whom 10 died and 7 survived. Prime Minister Shinzo Abe cut short his visit to Southeast Asia to return to Tokyo to focus on the situation. Japanese firm JGC Corp., which is involved in gas production in the plant, held meetings with the Japanese government. The Algerian ambassador was summoned to provide clarifications over the hostage-taking crisis.
- Malaysia: The Malaysian embassy in Algiers confirmed quality control inspector Chong Chung Ngen had been killed, while a second Malaysian missing in the hostage crisis was confirmed dead by Wisma Putra later. The Malaysian Foreign Ministry said in a statement on 26 January 2013 that Tan Ping Wee was identified by the forensic team through his dental records as well as confirmation of his tattoo by his family. The Malaysian Embassy in Algiers and the JGC Corp are arranging for the remains of Tan Ping Wee and Chong Chung Ngen to be flown home.
- Norway: Norwegian officials said that nine Norwegian citizens were held hostage. By the morning of 18 January, one had been freed. Norway sent a crisis team to their embassy in Algeria. They sent a commercial airliner that had been modified into a flying hospital. Ultimately the death of four Norwegian workers has been confirmed.
- Romania: The Ministry of Foreign Affairs said that five Romanian citizens had been taken hostage, one of whom was killed while trying to escape. Another died hours later in a hospital.
- Turkey: The Ministry of Foreign Affairs said that three Turkish nationals survived. The ministry identified the incident as a "terrorist attack", and strongly condemned it.
- United Kingdom: Prime Minister David Cameron confirmed that three British nationals had been killed, and another three were presumed dead. He stated he had not been informed in advance by Algerian authorities that an attempt to free the hostages would take place shortly.
- United States: Three Americans were killed: Frederick Buttacio of Katy, Texas, Victor Lynn Lovelady of Nederland, Texas who lived in the Houston area, and Gordon Lee Rowan of Sumpter, Oregon. The U.S. maintained its policy of zero negotiation with terrorists.

== Aftermath ==
The United Kingdom, Norway, the Philippines, France and Japan each have different methods of dealing with the overseas death of their subjects. France is carrying out a Judicial investigation. The French authorities will not exchange evidence with the UK Coroner. Norway has no Coronial process. In the UK a coronial hearing took place from September 2014 and concluded in February 2015. 69 witnesses were called and most gave evidence from the witness box in Court 73 in the High Court in London. All were cross examined by representatives of families of the deceased. A verdict will be reached by the coroner on the cause of death of each Briton and on the security at the plant. The transcript is online at The Coroner's factual findings are here. A verdict of unlawful killing was reached for each victim

BP are being sued in the US and in the UK for failing to protect their staff properly.

On 22 February 2013, Sonatrach on behalf of the joint venture started up a limited production at the In Amenas plant, involving one of the three plant trains. Staff from Statoil and BP were not redeployed at the time. full production recommenced in September 2014. The plant has reportedly been heavily fortified.

On 26 February 2013, Statoil commissioned a report to investigate the terrorist attack and to see what lessons could be learned. The report was published on 12 September 2013.

BP has stated that, unlike Statoil, it is not carrying out an inquiry. Sonatrach has been obstructive and refused to assist the UK coronial process.

The 3 captured terrorists are thought to be facing criminal trial in Algeria.

As of July 2014, unlike the families of BP and Statoil staff, there are still families of deceased agency workers who have received neither moral support nor financial recompense from the joint venture. These families have had to cope with losing not only their loved ones but also their means of support in countries where there are little or no social welfare systems. The JV claims that all agencies involved were contractually obliged to provide life cover, but the JV failed to verify that their agents complied with this.
