= In Amenas =

Ain Amenas عين أميناس
- Town and Commune

- Location of In Amenas commune within Illizi Province

- Location of In Amenas within Algeria
- Coordinates: 28°2′27″N 9°32′35″E
- Country: Algeria
- Province: Illizi
- District: Ain Amenas (seat)

Area
  - Total: 14,913 km^{2} (5,758 sq mi)
- Elevation: 549 m (1,801 ft)

Population (2008)
  - Total: 7,385
  - Density: 0.4952/km^{2} (1.283/sq mi)
- Time zone: UTC+01 (CET)
- Postal code: 33200
- ONS code: 3306

In Amenas (Arabic: إن أميناس, ‘In ’Amanās) is a town and commune in eastern Algeria, bordering Libya. The town is located 30 kilometres (19 mi) west of the border. There is no border crossing in the area. The municipality had 7,385 inhabitants in 2008, up from 5.302 in 1998, with an annual growth rate of 3.4% According to the Algerian novelist Mouloud Mammeri the name is a Tuareg word which means "place of camel drivers."

The natural gas facility near the municipality was attacked by Islamist militants in January 2013.

== Climate ==
In Amenas has a hot desert climate (Köppen climate classification BWh). Summers are long and very hot with average high temperatures over 40 °C (104 °F) during June, July and August. Winters remain warm and brief at daytime but nights can be quite cold, with average low temperatures below 4 °C (39 °F) during January, the coolest month of the year. In Amenas averages annual rainfall of only 23.2 mm (0.91 in) as the town is located within the large central hyperarid core of the Sahara Desert. The sky is always clear over In Amenas throughout the year and the relative humidity is very low, especially during summer months.

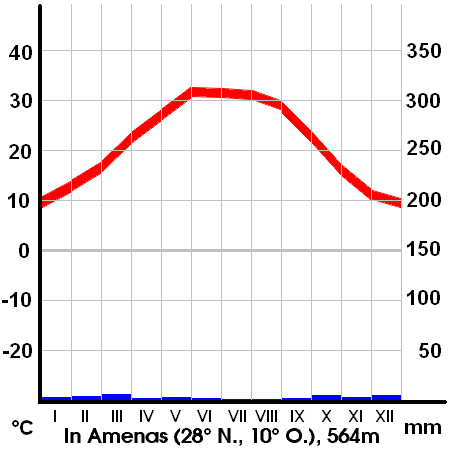
Climate In Amenas

Climate data for In Amenas (1991-2020)
Month	Jan	Feb	Mar	Apr	May	Jun	Jul	Aug	Sep	Oct	Nov	Dec	Year
Record high °C (°F)	32.6 (90.7)	36.0 (96.8)	37.8 (100.0)	43.7 (110.7)	44.4 (111.9)	46.3 (115.3)	47.6 (117.7)	46.1 (115.0)	43.6 (110.5)	40.6 (105.1)	37.4 (99.3)	31.3 (88.3)	47.6 (117.7)
Mean daily maximum °C (°F)	17.1 (62.8)	21.0 (69.8)	25.3 (77.5)	32.7 (90.9)	35.9 (96.6)	40.8 (105.4)	41.9 (107.4)	41.2 (106.2)	39.4 (102.9)	33.7 (92.7)	25.2 (77.4)	18.4 (65.1)	31.1 (87.9)
Daily mean °C (°F)	10.8 (51.4)	13.2 (55.8)	18.0 (64.4)	23.4 (74.1)	28.2 (82.8)	31.9 (89.4)	32.6 (90.7)	32.2 (90.0)	30.2 (86.4)	24.5 (76.1)	17.4 (63.3)	12.1 (53.8)	22.9 (73.2)
Mean daily minimum °C (°F)	3.3 (37.9)	5.5 (41.9)	10.0 (50.0)	15.4 (59.7)	20.4 (68.7)	24.0 (75.2)	24.4 (75.9)	24.4 (75.9)	22.6 (72.7)	17.1 (62.8)	9.9 (49.8)	5.0 (41.0)	15.2 (59.4)
Average precipitation mm (inches)	1.7 (0.07)	1.3 (0.05)	4.1 (0.16)	3.0 (0.12)	2.0 (0.08)	0.8 (0.03)	0.0 (0.0)	0.2 (0.01)	1.3 (0.05)	4.1 (0.16)	2.8 (0.11)	1.0 (0.04)	22.3 (0.88)
Average precipitation days (≥ 1 mm)	0.4	0.3	0.7	0.5	0.6	0.2	0.0	0.1	0.4	0.9	0.2	0.3	4.6
Average relative humidity (%)	47.7	42.5	33.1	28.5	25.2	23.1	21.0	24.0	27.8	37.8	40.1	47.1	33.2
Mean monthly sunshine hours	262.1	251.5	279.6	—	288.2	307.0	363.1	350.9	293.1	282.2	258.2	232.8	—
Source 1: NOAA, climatebase.ru (extremes, humidity)
Source 2: en.climatedata.org (averages max temperatures)

== Transport ==
It is served by In Amenas Airport with Air Algérie flights to Algiers, Hassi Messaoud, Oran and Ouargla and Tassili Airlines flights to Adrar, El Golea, El Oued, In Salah, Tébessa and Touggourt.

== Economy ==
=== Natural gas ===
In Amenas is the starting point of the In Amenas-Haoud El Hamra oil pipeline and the In Amenas-Hassi Messaoud gas pipeline.

The natural gas joint development project (known as the In Amenas Gas Project) which includes four primary gas fields plus the gathering and processing facilities in Tiguentourine, 25 kilometres (16 mi) outside the town, was commissioned in 2006. The project is operated by Sonatrach, BP, and Statoil. Zarzaitine is one of the notable sites Sonatrach is operating in the area.

== History ==
=== 2013 In Amenas hostage crisis ===
In January 2013, the Tigantourine gas facility was attacked by Islamist militants. At least 39 foreign hostages, along with an Algerian security guard, were killed when the facility was stormed after a four day stand-off. A total of 685 Algerian workers and 107 foreigners were freed. It was one of many attacks in the Maghreb carried out by Islamist groups since 2002.

== Education ==
7.0% of the population has a tertiary education, and another 16.9% has completed secondary education. The overall literacy rate is 80.0%, and is 85.0% among males and 72.8% among females.

== Localities ==
The commune is composed of eight localities:

- Centre CIS
- Zone Industrielle
- Zarzaitine
- Edjeleh
- Elhadeb
- Larache
- Saut du Mouflon
- Ohanet
