= In Amenas District =

Ain Amenas District دائرة أمناس
- District
- Map of Algeria highlighting Illizi Province

- Map of Illizi Province highlighting In Amenas District
- Coordinates: 28°2′N 9°32′E
- Country: Algeria
- Province: Illizi
- District seat: In Amenas

Area
  - Total: 128,730 km^{2} (49,700 sq mi)

Population (2008)
  - Total: 17,422
  - Density: 0.13534/km^{2} (0.35052/sq mi)
- Time zone: UTC+01 (CET)
- Municipalities: 3

In Amenas is a district in Illizi Province, Algeria. It was named after its capital, In Amenas. As of the 2008 census it is the largest district in the province by area and second-largest by population (after Djanet District).

== Municipalities ==
The district is further divided into 3 municipalities:

- In Amenas
- Bordj Omar Driss
- Debdeb
