= Illizi Province =

Province of Algeria

Illizi Province ولاية اليزي
- Province
- Map of Algeria highlighting Illizi
- Coordinates: 26°29′N 8°28′E
- Country: Algeria
- Capital: Illizi

Government
  - PPA president: Abdelkader Benhoued
  - Wāli: Ahcene Khaldi

Area
  - Total: 198,815 km^{2} (76,763 sq mi)

Population (2008)
  - Total: 52,333
  - Density: 0.26322/km^{2} (0.68175/sq mi)
- Time zone: UTC+01 (CET)
- Area Code: +213 (0) 29
- ISO 3166 code: DZ-33
- Districts: 3
- Municipalities: 6

Illizi (Arabic: ولاية اليزي) is a large province (wilaya) in the south-eastern corner of Algeria named after its eponymous seat. It borders Ouargla Province to the north, Tunisia to the extreme northeast, Libya to the east, Djanet Province to the south and, to the west, In Salah Province and Tamanrasset Province. As of the 2008 census, the province had a population of 52,333 and an annual growth rate of 4.5%.

== History ==
The province was created from Ouargla Province in 1984. In January 2013, a hostage crisis occurred in a natural gas facility near In Amenas.

== Administrative divisions ==
The province is divided into 2 districts, which are further divided into 4 communes or municipalities.

District	Commune	Map
Illizi District	Illizi	ﻳﻠﻴﺰى
In Amenas District	Bordj Omar Driss	برج عمار إدريس
In Amenas District	Debdeb	دبدب
In Amenas District	In Amenas	إن أمناس

=== Natural resources ===
The area is rich in natural gas. One of the most promising sites for natural gas production is the Ain Tsila gas field in the Isarene permit, some 57% of which is owned by the Irish company Petroceltic International, 18% by the Italian company Enel, and the rest by the Algerian government-owned Sonatrach. Reportedly, Petroceltic's 56.7% is worth between US$800 million and US$1 billion.
