= Grand Erg Oriental =

Coordinates: 30°00′N 6°00′E

Grand Erg Oriental العرق الشرقي الكبير
- Erg
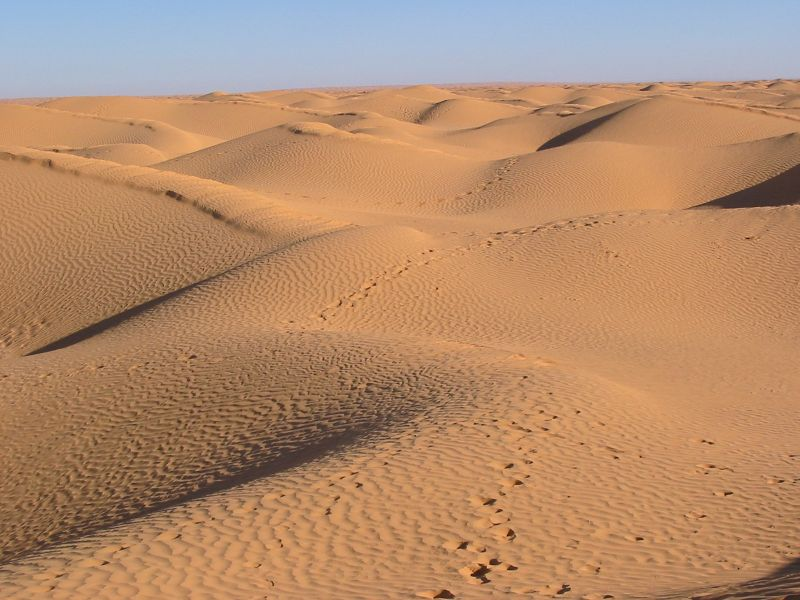
- Landscape of the sand dune 'seas' of the Grand Erg Oriental. Other areas are hard pressed gravel. There are also settlements, and oil and gas extraction zones.

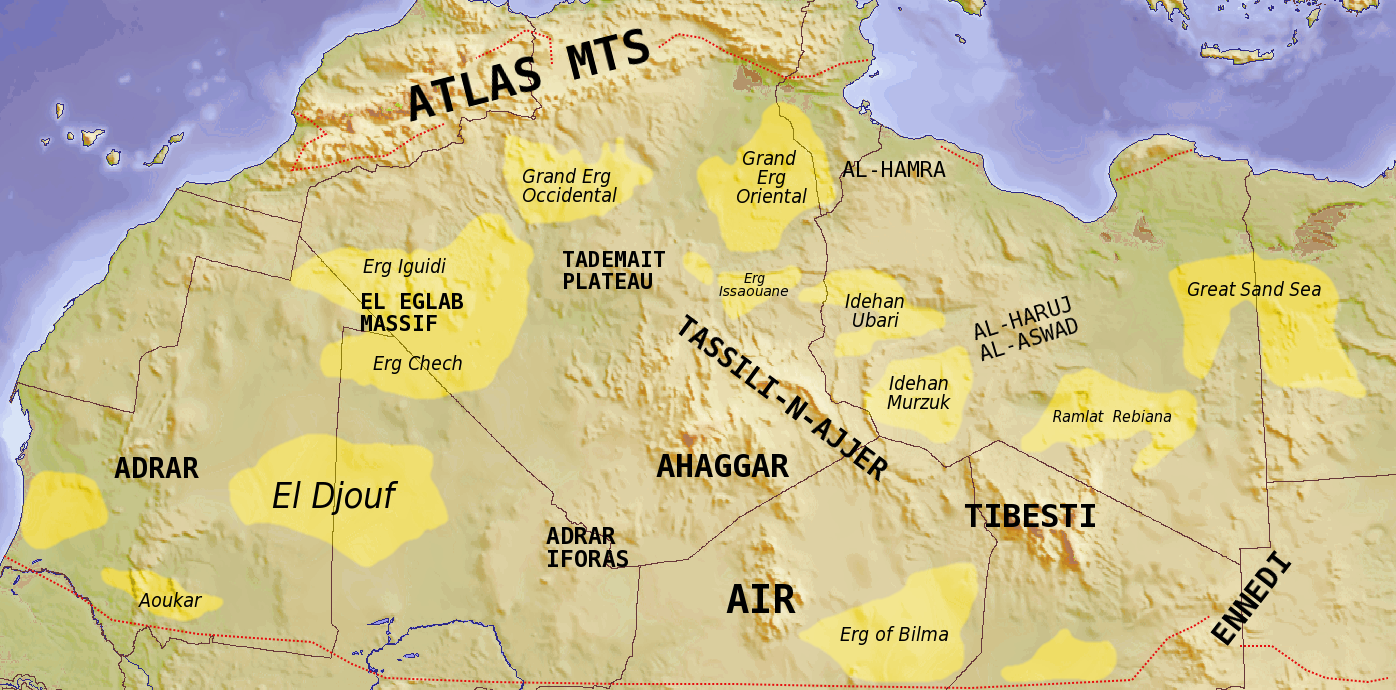
- Major Saharan topography, showing the Grand Erg Oriental in yellow at top center, right.
- Country: Algeria and Tunisia

Area
  - Total: 185,000 km^{2} (71,000 sq mi)

Dimensions
  - Length: 620 km (390 mi)
  - Width: 400 km (250 mi)
- Elevation: 280 m (920 ft)

Population
  - Total: 20,000
  - Density: 0.11/km^{2} (0.28/sq mi)
- (Estimation)

The Grand Erg Oriental (English: Great Eastern Sand Sea) is a large erg or "field of sand dunes" in the Sahara Desert. Situated for the most part in Saharan lowlands of northeast Algeria, the Grand Erg Oriental covers an area of some 185,000 sq. km (about the size of North Dakota or twice the size of Portugal). It is the second largest erg in Algeria after Erg Chech. The erg's northeastern edge spills over into neighbouring Tunisia (about 30,000 sq. km) It borders the Atlas and the Aurès Mountains as well as the mountainous region of Jebel Dahar in Tunisia to the north, and the Hamada of Tinrhert and the Tademait Plateau to the south. - Erg is a Tamachek Berber word, and also a geographic term of art.

== Formation and development ==
Ground-penetrating radar (GPR) can be used to map the internal structure of large dunes, and Radiocarbon dating of organic material or thermoluminescence dating can be used to determine the time frame within which the individual sand layers of a dune were deposited. A few measurements are available for the Grand Erg Oriental, which indicate the following possible development:

Towards the end of the Pliocene, until about 2,5 million years ago, the Sahara had a humid tropical climate. During this time, large river systems washed considerable amounts of sand into the basins of the Sahara. In the area of the Grand Erg Oriental, it was the Oued Igharghar, which rises in the Ahaggar Mountains, that brought sand from the south. From the north and northwest, the sand was brought in by various river courses from the Atlas and Aurès Mountains. The formation of the sand seas in the Sahara began in the Pleistocene, around 1,6 million years ago. This occurred during the various dry periods of this era until 11,000 years ago and in the subsequent Holocene between 5,000 and 3,000 years ago. During these arid epochs, the sand was not stabilized by vegetation, and the wind strength and thus its mobilizing power was considerably higher than today during certain periods. This allowed much more massive dunes to form than is possible under today's wind conditions. The northeast trade winds drove the sand from the area of today's Chott Melghir and Chott el Jerid with their salty clay crust soils to the southwest, so that there are no dunes there today.

== Topography ==
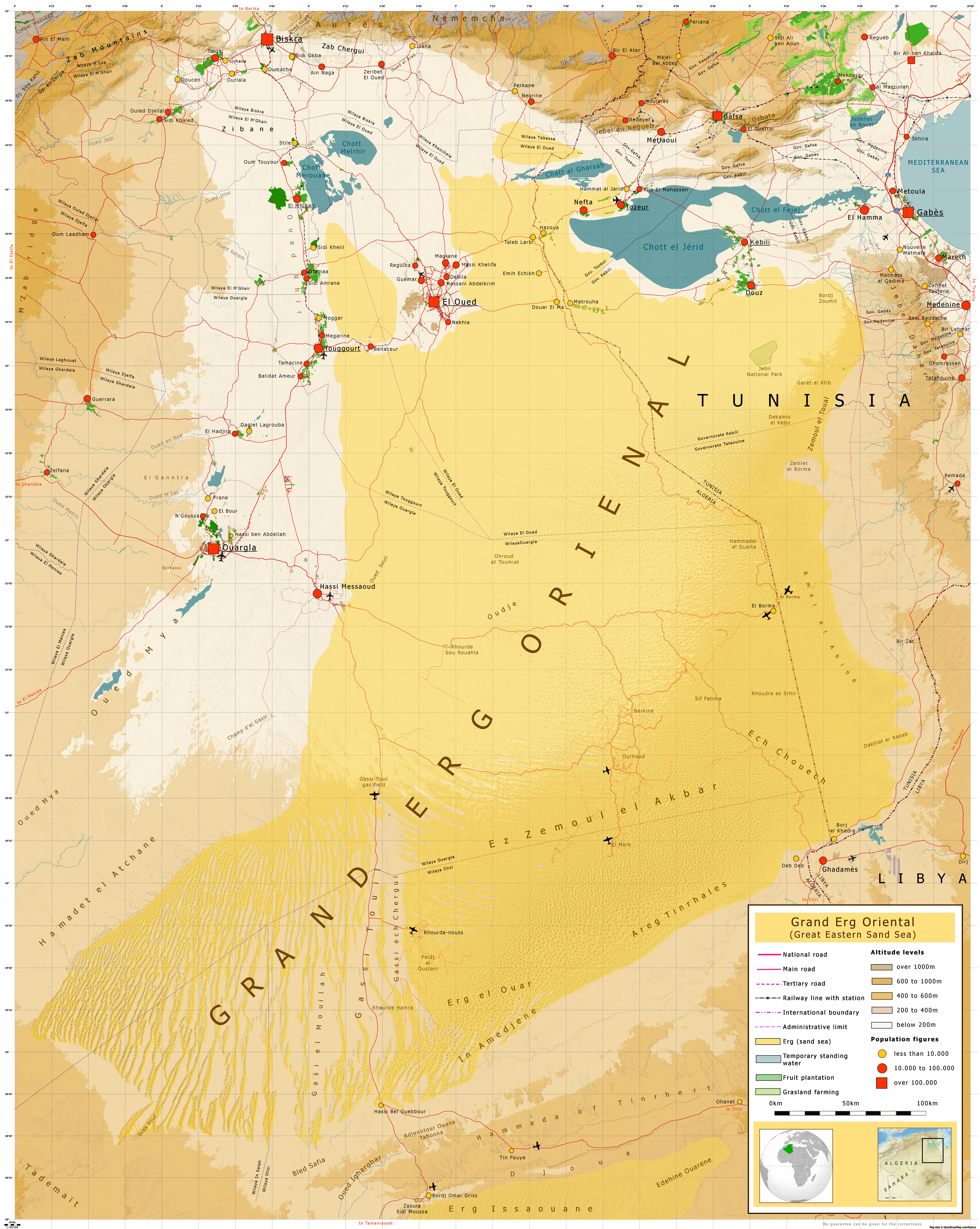
Topographic map of the Grand Erg Oriental

The Grand Erg Oriental is about 70% covered with sand. An estimate of the sand volume comes to several hundred cubic kilometers. Every year, about 6 million tons of sand are added by wind transport from the north. However, there is also a certain amount of sand flowing southward. But with the exception of its southwestern part, the erg has a positive sediment balance, while the ergs of the central Sahara lose sand to the ergs on the southern edge of the Sahara. – The sand of the erg consists mainly of quartz, with a small amount of tourmaline and zircon. In the northern and northeastern edges of the erg, the grains are generally larger than further south.

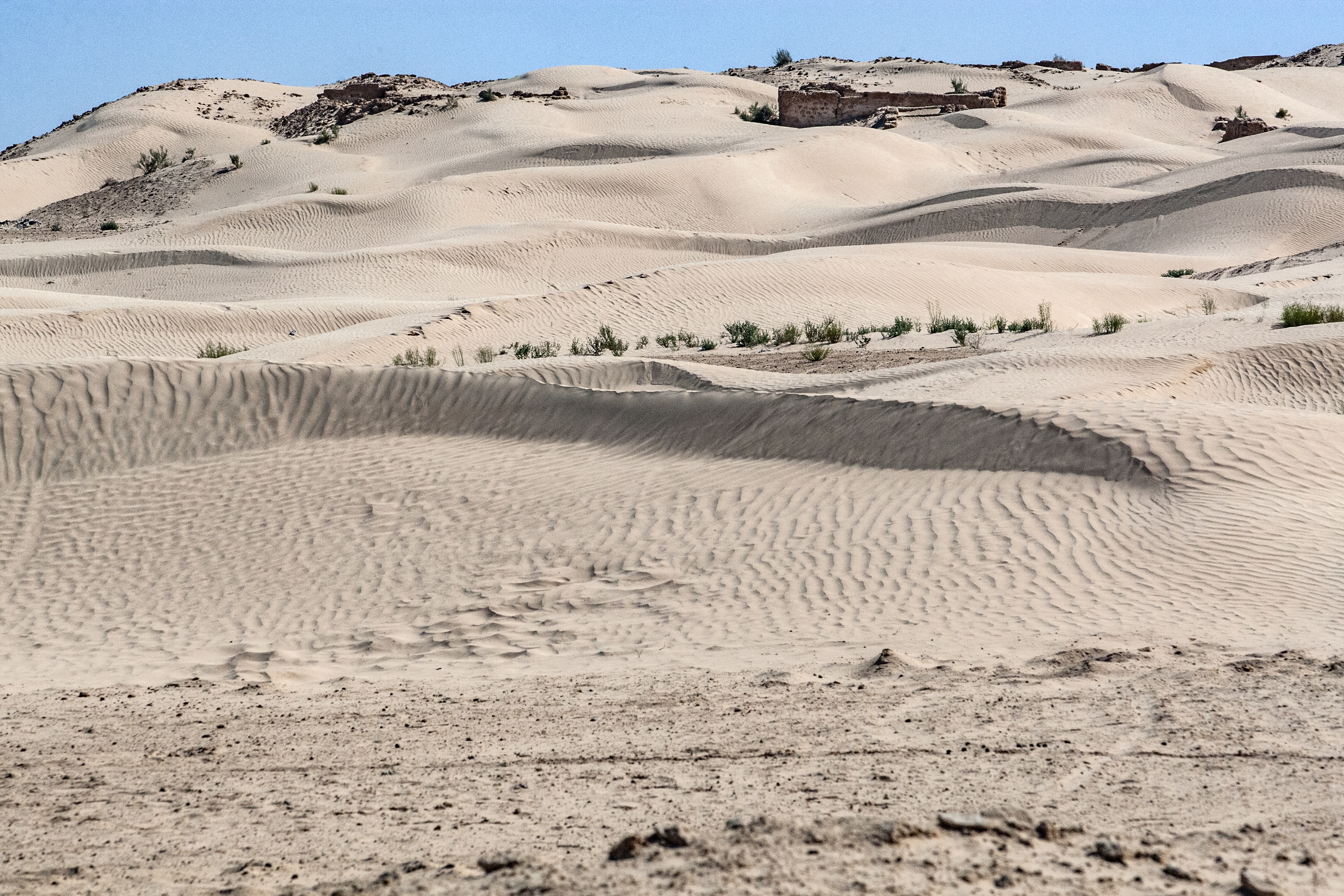
Dune landscape near Douz, Tunisia

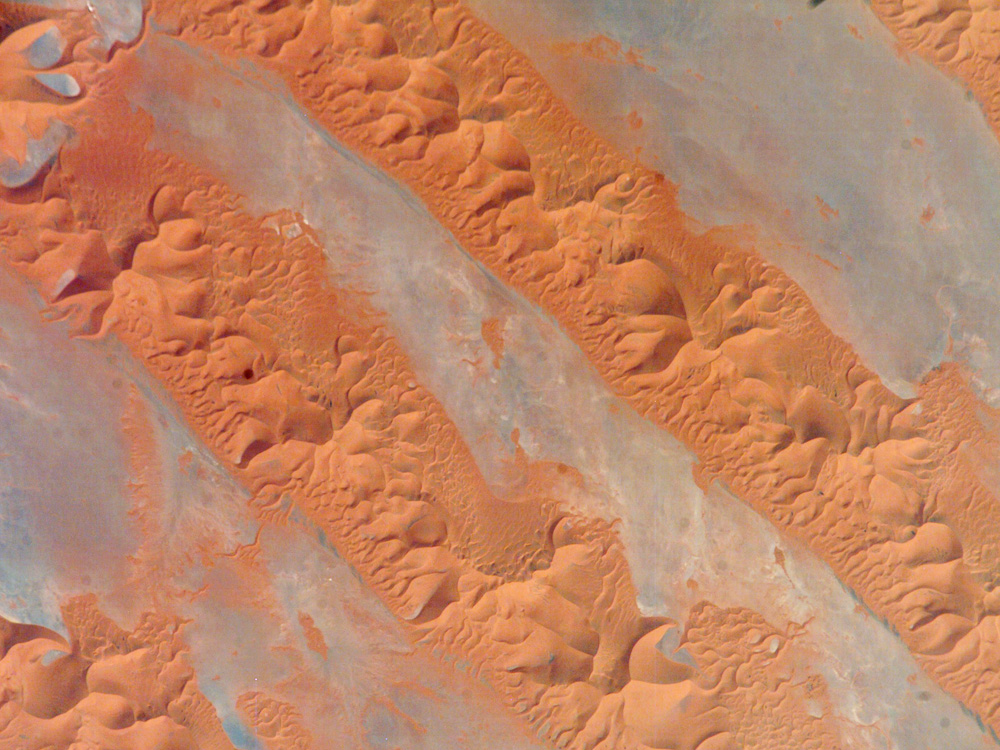
In the southwest of the Grand Erg Oriental: star dunes sit on longitudinal dunes, between gassi

The size of the dunes increases continuously from north to south. Nearby the cities of Ouargla and Touggourt, within the boundaries of this erg, the landscape is described as being "practically free from [sand] dunes" evidently due to strong, persistent winds. In the northwest, there are mainly seif dunes (longitudinal dunes) whose crests run from northeast to southwest, following the main wind direction. These dunes have long, sharp ridge lines. Cross-winds, however, may alter the height or width of such lengthy dunes, with the slope being steep on both sides. The dunes in the east, in Tunisia and the adjacent Algerian region, are barchanoid and interconnected barchanoid ridges that form a net-like pattern. On Barchan dunes the slope on the windward side is gradual, on the leeward steep, and such dunes may "roll" forward being blown in the direction of the wind is taking. These dunes tend to be perpendicular to the wind's direction. The southern part on the border with Tunisia and the southern tip of Tunisia are covered by approximately 400 dome dunes, covering an area of around 2,600 km².

The southern half of the erg is dominated by star dunes. They lie within an area of approximately 66,000 km². It is the largest accumulation of star dunes in the world. Star dunes are formed under complex wind conditions. In the southwestern part of the erg, within an area of approximately 27,000 km², these star dunes sit on longitudinal dunes. Such dunes are also called draa or mega dunes and were subject to a change in wind regime during their formation. The largest star dunes of the erg reach a diameter of 2.4 km and a height of 230 m. Star dunes appear to migrate.

Between the dune chains lie the gassi, wind-swept deflation corridors of hard-pressed reg (gravel), such as the Gassi Touil, which follows the old course of the Oued Igharghar, or the Gassi El Mouilah, both of which are up to 20 km wide and show that the sediment balance here is negative.

== Hydrology ==
The climate is hyper arid, with average annual precipitation of 60 mm in the north of the erg. Further south, it decreases, reaching 25 mm at the southern edge. However, there is a lot of water stored underground: the Aquifer Continental Intercalaire, one of the largest closed aquifers in the world, stores around 60,000 cubic kilometers of water and extends over large areas of the Algerian, Tunisian, and Libyan northern Sahara. Most of this water is fossil water that seeped into the ground during the wet periods of the Pleistocene in the Atlas Mountains and Aurès region, the M'zab ridge west of Touggourt, and the Dahar mountain range in southern Tunisia. These elevations are located in the vicinity of the erg. In addition, the Oued Igharghar and its groundwater probably also made a contribution.

In recent decades, the aquifer's water has been exploited on a large scale with the construction of thousands of wells, including for agricultural production centers. However, this has led to problems such as falling or rising groundwater levels and deterioration in groundwater quality.

== Flora and fauna ==
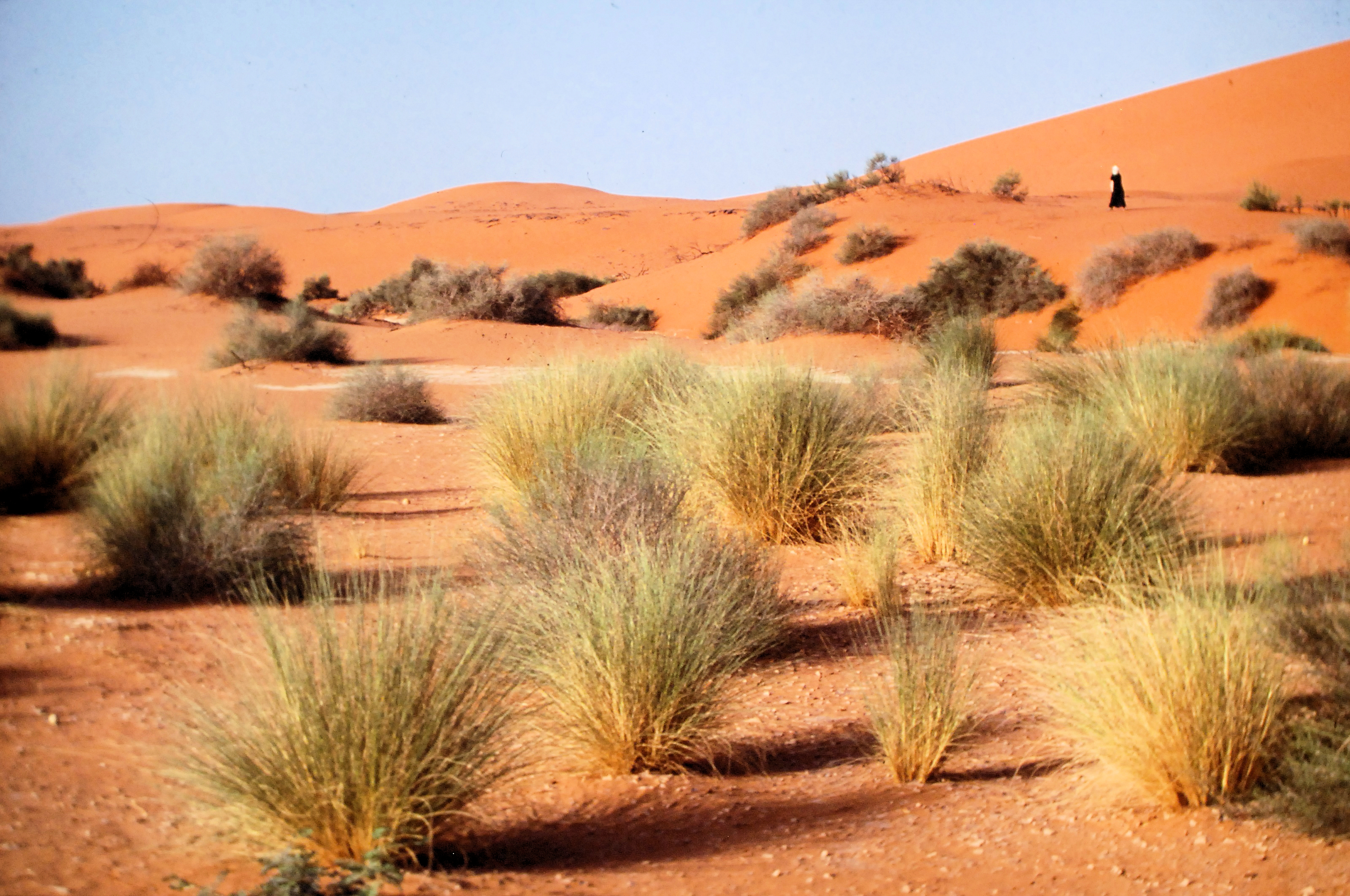
Drinn grass, food for gazelles and camels

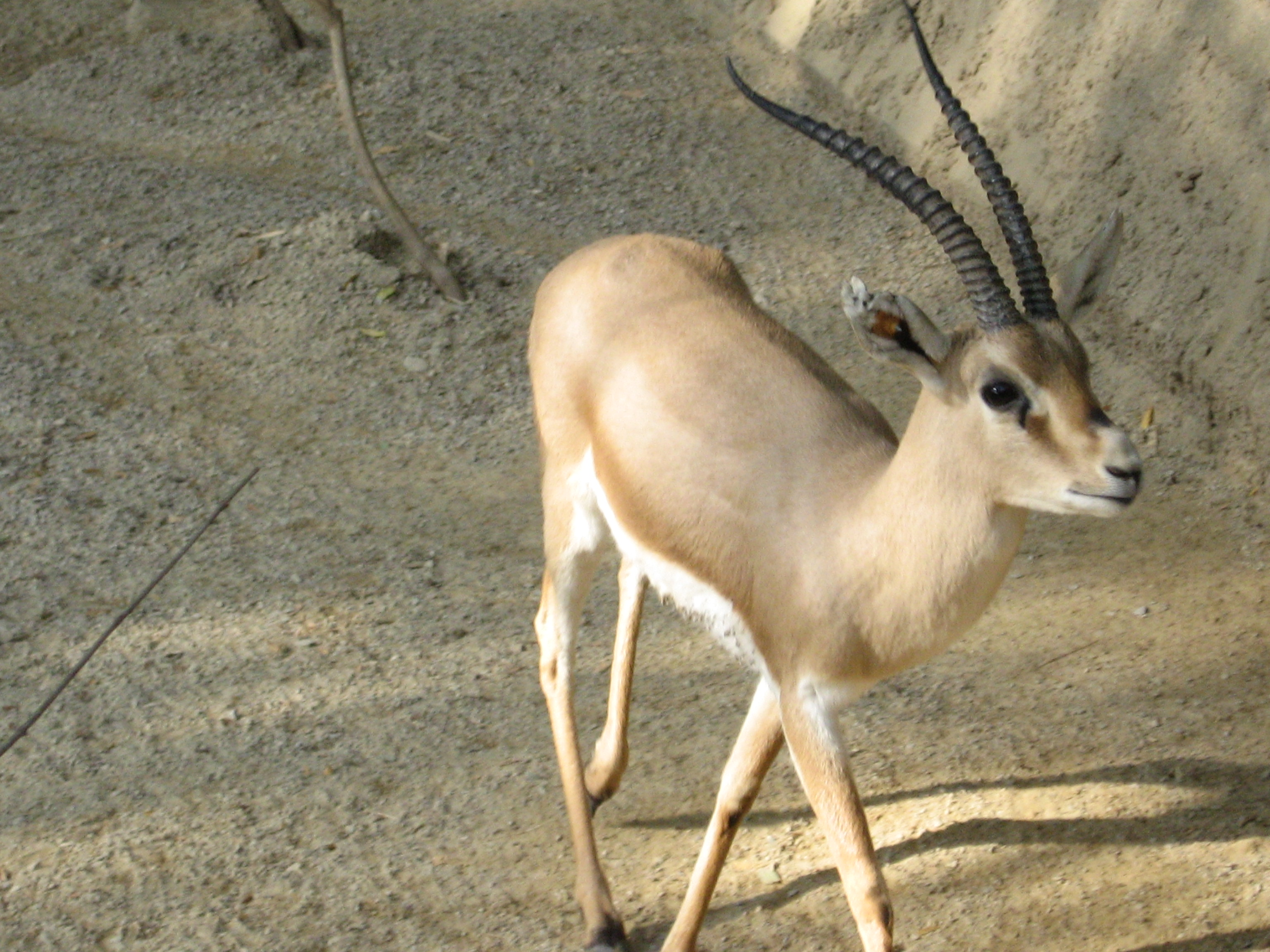
Rhim or slender-horned gazelle (Gazella leproceros)

Commonly found are Drinn grass (stipagrostis pungens), a good pasture for gazelles, but also for camels, and Euphorbia guyonia, a spurge used in traditional medicine as a remedy for warts, coughs, and scorpion stings. Among the shrubs, one finds broom (Retama raetam), sea lavender (Limoniastrum guyonianum), and foxtail (Hammada schmittiana). There are also four species of Calligonum (knotweed family). Three of these species are shrubs 1 to 3 m high. The fourth species, Calligonum arich, grows only on the high dune ridges and can reach a height of up to 10 m with its tree-like growth. However, its population is endangered in the Tunisian part of the erg. Its wood, mostly in the form of charcoal, is highly sought after by locals for baking flatbread and making tea. Off-road vehicles are used to search increasingly remote regions of the interlocking dunes for firewood, even though logging was banned some time ago.

Between 2006 and 2009, an inventory of large mammals was carried out in selected sectors of the erg on the Tunisian and on the Algerian side. The following animals or traces of them were sighted:

- The Rhim gazelle (Gazella leptoceros loderi Thomas, 1894). Today, its population is classified as critically endangered by the IUCN. Illegal hunting seems to be the main possible cause.
- The Cape hare (Lepus capensis)
- The fennec fox (Vulpes zerda)
- The Rüppell's fox (Vulpes rueppelii)

The Jebil National Park in the Tunisian part of the erg, covering an area of 1,500 sq. km and located 70 km south of the city of Douz (pop 2014: 30,245), serves to protect the flora and fauna in this region. A group of addax antelopes (Addax nasomaculatus) lives in a 77 sq. km enclosure within the park with the aim of breeding and reintroduction into the wild.

== Routes, cities, settlements ==
The Grand Erg Oriental is accessible overland by an Algerian road, RN 3, a national road from Constantine on the Mediterranean to Djanet in southeastern Algeria. It passes through the Aurès mountains to the city of Biskra (pop: 200,000). Later, the Chott Merouane follows on the way to Touggourt, where the road skirts the western edge of the erg. Touggourt (pop: 153,000) was formerly a medieval Sultanate and a northern oasis on a Trans-Saharan trade route. From there, a 100 km road (RN 16) leads northeast to El Oued, a mid-sized Algerian city (pop: 139,000), graced with domes and arches of Saharan architecture. From El Oued, the RN 16 leads into the Grand Erg Oriental region and crosses the Tunisian border. From there, it continues as RN 3 to the eastern edge of the erg with the cities of Nefta (pop 2014: 21,654) and Tozeur (pop 2014: 37,370) and continues to Tunis.

After about 500 km in all, the (Algerian) RN 3 reaches the ancient oasis of Ouargla. Since late antiquity Ouargla was a stop for the Saharan trade, being situated along a caravan route of several thousand kilometers, stretching from the Mediterranean to the Sahel. Ouargla is today a mid-sized modern city (pop: 129,000), with a focus on the oil industry.

Southeast of Ouargla on the RN 3, lies Hassi Messaoud ["blessed well"]. Hassi Messaoud used to be a small settlement, but has grown substantially on account of the local discovery of oil in 1956. An oil refinery has since been built, and the city's current population is estimated at 53,000.

A desert road is going east from Hassi Messaoud (RN 35A) through the Grand Erg Oriental on its way to the settlement of El Borma (pop 2020: 3,700) on the Tunisian border, with oil production facilities. RN 35, a branch of this road, leads south to the settlement of Deb Deb (pop 2020 estimated 900) on the Tunisian and Libyan border.

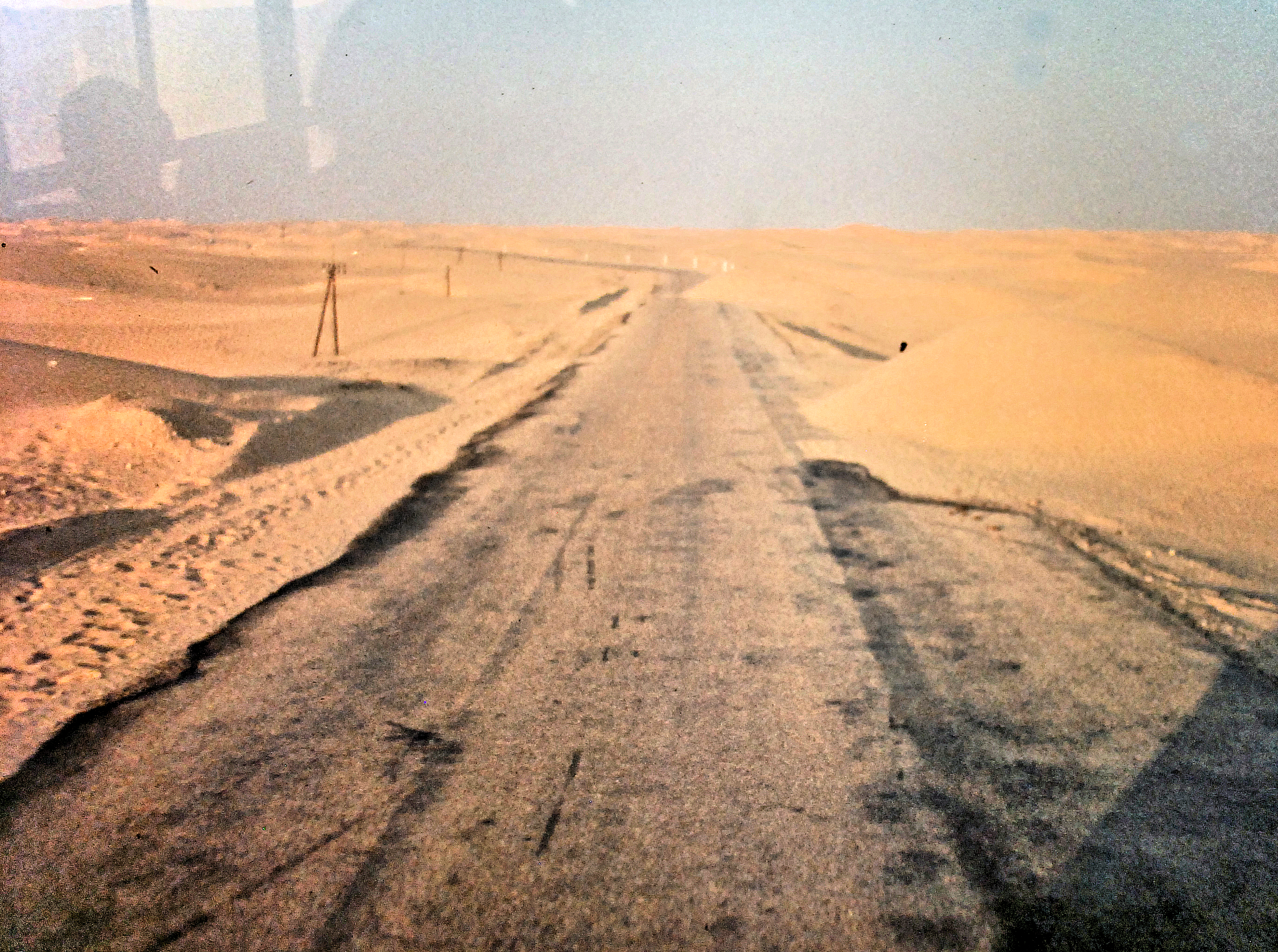
1973: Road with shifting dunes between El Oued and Touggourt

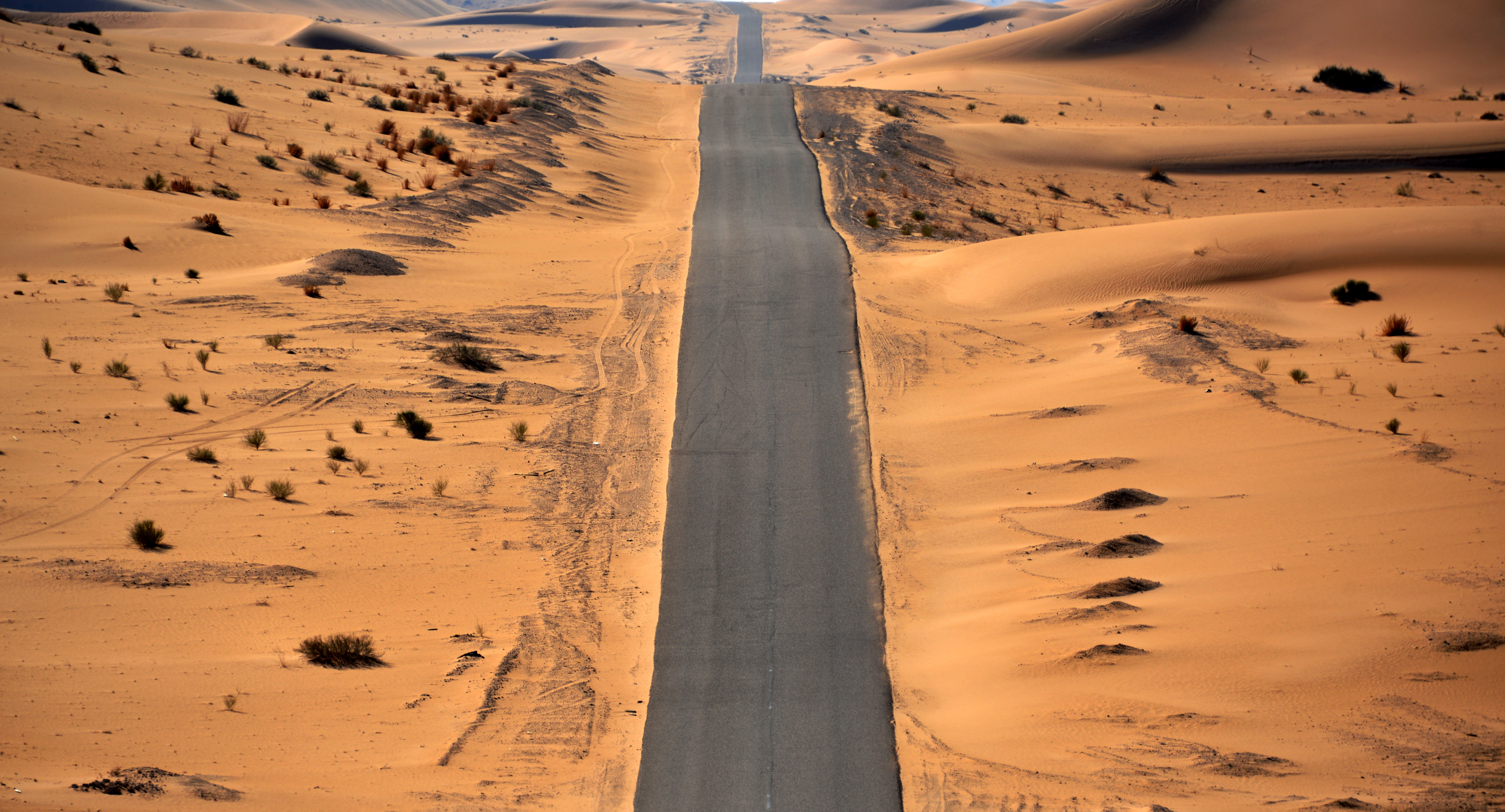
Road through dune area, with embankments on either side to prevent sand accumulation

Beyond the Algerian border lies Ghadames in Libya (pop 2005: 9.874) The town is situated directly adjacent to the erg's southeast edge. The historic Saharan architecture found in its Old Town has received international recognition.

The RN 3 goes on from Hassi Messaoud south, also crossing the Grand Erg Oriental where it passes through Gassi Touil, as did the ancient caravan route, before reaching the erg's far side at Hassi Bel Guebour.

The ancient caravans through the Sahara avoided dune areas wherever possible. Even today, the unstable sandy soil and, above all, the drifting sand on the roads cause problems. The RN 53 and RN 53A cross several difficult, winding dune areas. To protect such traffic routes from sand drifts, the traditional method of small embankments is still used today. These consist of heavier, mostly natural material with a grain size of more than 2 mm, which is not blown away. The aim is to allow the sand to blow across the road but not remain there, and to dissipate shifting dunes.

There are more settlements within the erg: On the border with Tunisia are Taleb Larbi (pop 2020: 4,500), Emih Echikh (pop 2020: 640) and Douar El Ma (pop 2020: 3,700). Located in Tunisia, on the border with Algeria, are Hazoua (pop 2024: 6,186) and Matrouha (pop 2020: 970).

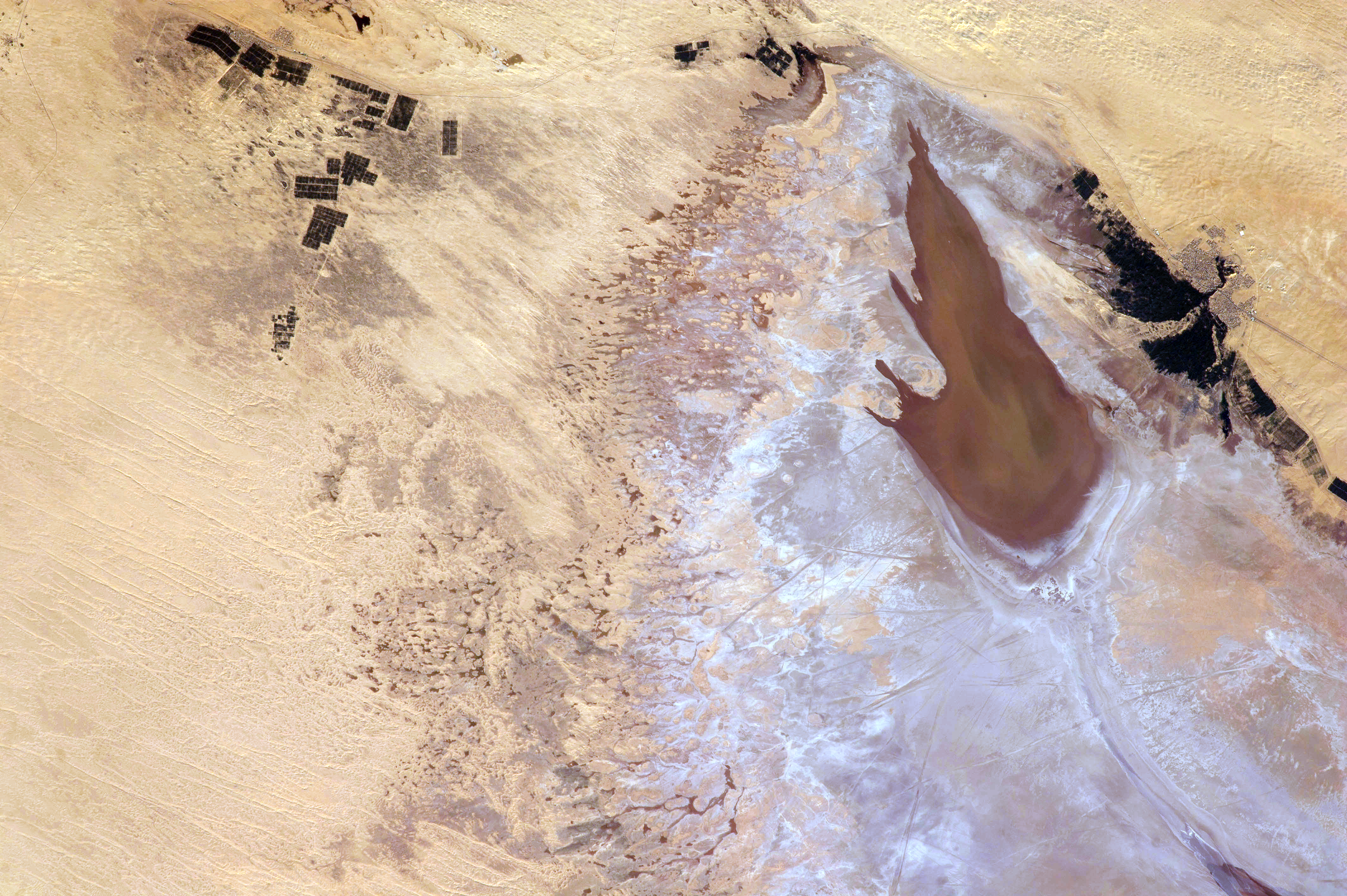
ISS expedition 40: Chott el Djerid, right above the center: Nefta, top left: cultivated areas of Hazoua. North: to the right

== Agriculture and livestock farming ==
There are only a few large-scale cultivation areas within the erg: around In Hazoua and Matrouha in Tunisia, there are date palm plantations. In the Algerian part of the erg, there are some cultivation areas along the Gassi Touil. In the wider area surrounding the erg, it is primarily the agricultural production centers north of Ouargla and between Touggourt and El M'Ghair where tens of thousands of date palms are cultivated. Here grow "the finest dates of all the Maghrib". In Tunisia, it is the area around Douz.

In the municipality of El Borma, several breeders own a total herd of 6,600 camels. In the northern Algerian Sahara, camels are now mainly raised for their milk, meat (fattening), or as part of mixed farming. Feeding is adapted accordingly: grazing with or without supervision, feeding in stables, or mixed feeding.

== Oil industry ==
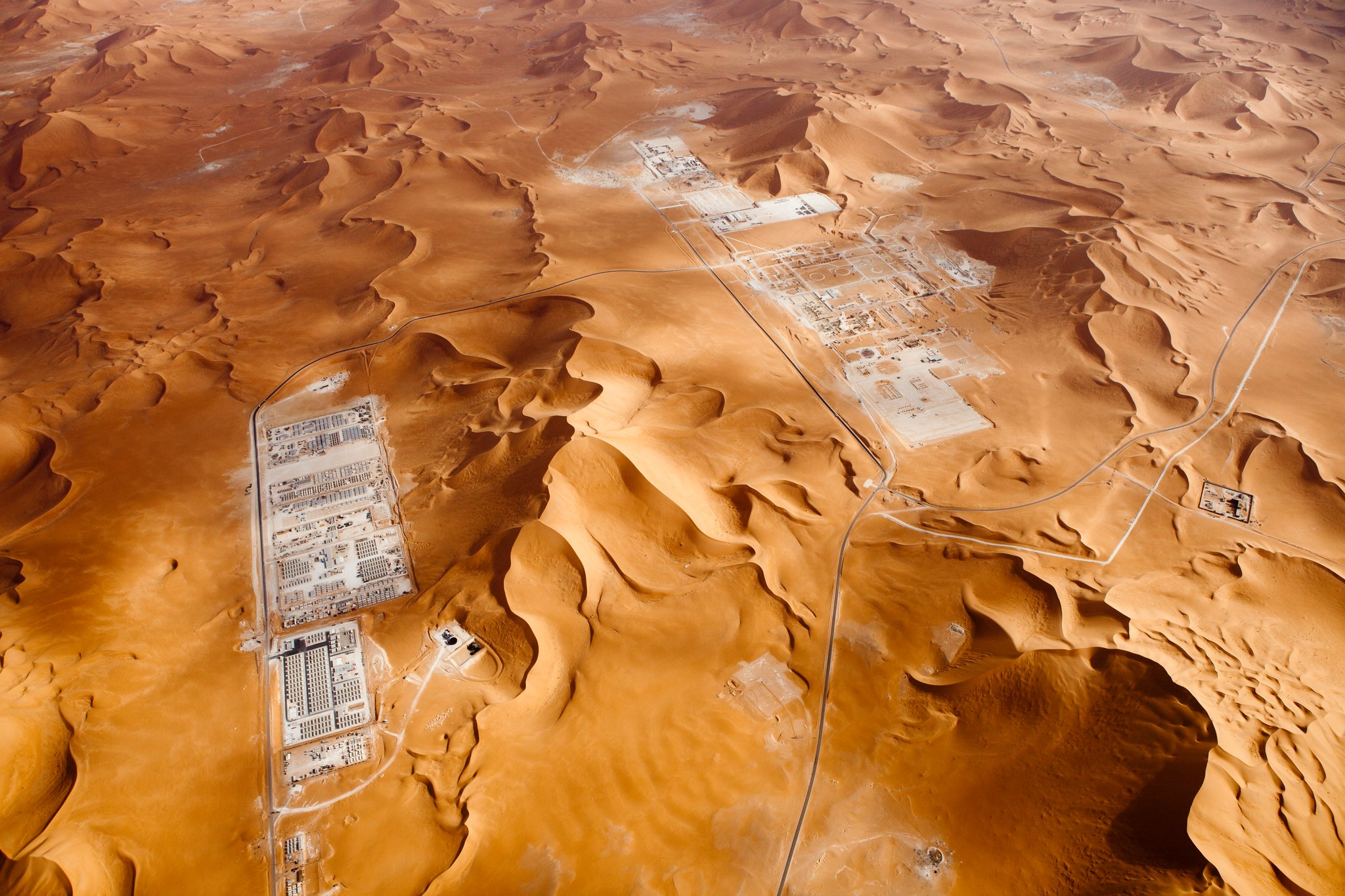
El Merk, Algerian gas and oil production facilities between star dunes in the south of the Grand Erg Oriental

Petroleum and natural gas have been extracted in Algeria, from areas in and surrounding the Grand Erg Oriental. In addition to oil in El Borma (see above) there are three fields in the erg: Berkine, Ourhoud and El Merk. A large gas field has been exploited in Gassi Touil since 1961. On the Tunisian side, close to the border, lies the Al Borma oil field, and concessions for oil production have been granted southeast of El Borma and further south for natural gas.

== See also ==
- Jebil National Park (Tunisia)
- Issaouane Erg
- Erg Tiffernine
- Grand Erg Occidental
- Sahara Desert
- Geography of Algeria
- Geography of Tunisia
- Erg
- Dune
- List of ergs
