= Jebil National Park =

National park in Tunisia

- Location within Tunisia
- Location: Tunisia
- Coordinates: 32°54′4″N 9°9′25″E
- Area: 1,500 km^{2} (580 sq mi)
- Established: 1994

Jebil is a national park in Tunisia situated within the Grand Erg Oriental in the Sahara desert. Covering an area of 150,000 hectares, it is the country's second-largest national park, after Senghar-Jebbes National Park. Though large, it is relatively new having been designated a national park in 1994 (unofficially since 1984). Until Senghar-Jebbes was declared, Jebil was the only national park within the Sahara Desert proper.

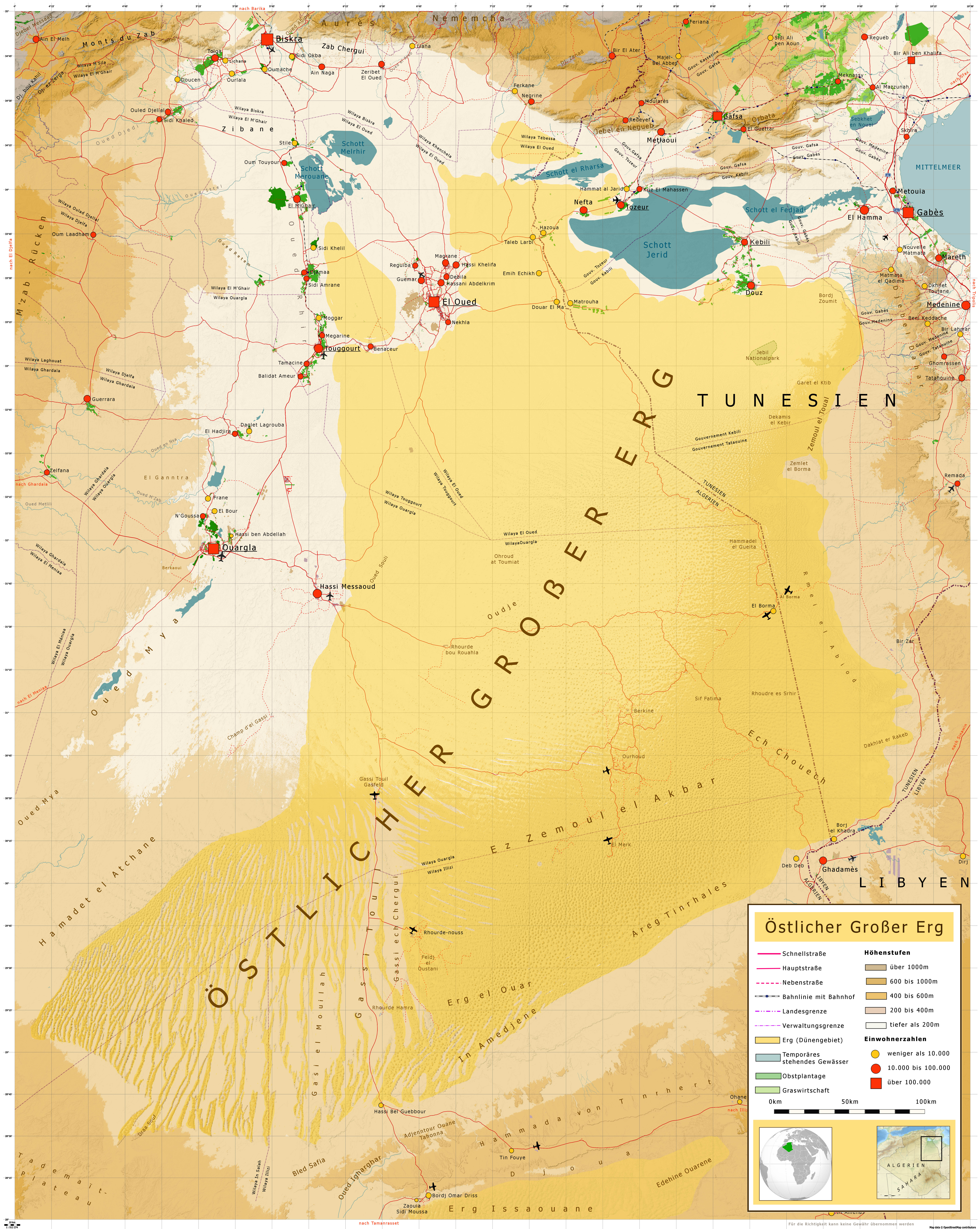
Grand Erg Oriental: The park is located in the upper right part of the erg.

== Description ==
Jebil National Park is located 80 km south of Douz. Its vegetation includes desert shrubs like Retama raetam, which are common in regions inhabited by gazelle, hare and horn viper. It also includes flowering grasses of the Calligonum family (Calligonum arich and Calligonum azel), as well as Arthrophytum schmittianum, Aristida pungens and the daisy flowering plant Rhanterium suavolens.

The park has guarded shelters for tourists who frequent the area (guards are stationed throughout the park). Research also takes place in the park, since the site is home to a number of prehistoric artifacts which are studied to learn about the different stages of human history from the Holocene up to World War II.

In the western portion, there are 'gigantic boulders' which were formed through weathering of plutonic rocks.

== Fauna ==
The park is home to a variety of wildlife including the fennec fox, horned viper, cobra, jackal, and the barbary sheep, which are endemic to the region. The snakes and other reptiles live under rocks and in sandy depressions.

=== Mammals ===
The dorcas Gazelle Gazella dorcas (VU) and the Rhim gazelle Gazella leptoceros (EN) are both still present in the park. Cheetah Acinonyx jubatus (VU) once present has probably disappeared. A group of addax antelopes (Addax nasomaculatus) lives in a 77 sq. km enclosure within the park with the aim of breeding and reintroduction into the wild.

=== Birds ===
The park is classified worldwide as an Important Bird Area (TN043). This is the only protected location in Tunisia where the desert sparrow Passer simplex has been recorded and one of only two at which the thick-billed lark Ramphocoris clotbey occurs. The Houbara bustard Chlamydotis undulata, very rare in Tunisia and in the Vulnerable category worldwide has been found to be nesting only within the enclosed area of the Park, indicating the importance Jebil national Park for the conservation of this bird.

=== Threats ===
The main threat to the site is poaching (of gazelles Gazella, of sandgrouse Pterocles and of the African houbara bustard Chlamydotis undulata).

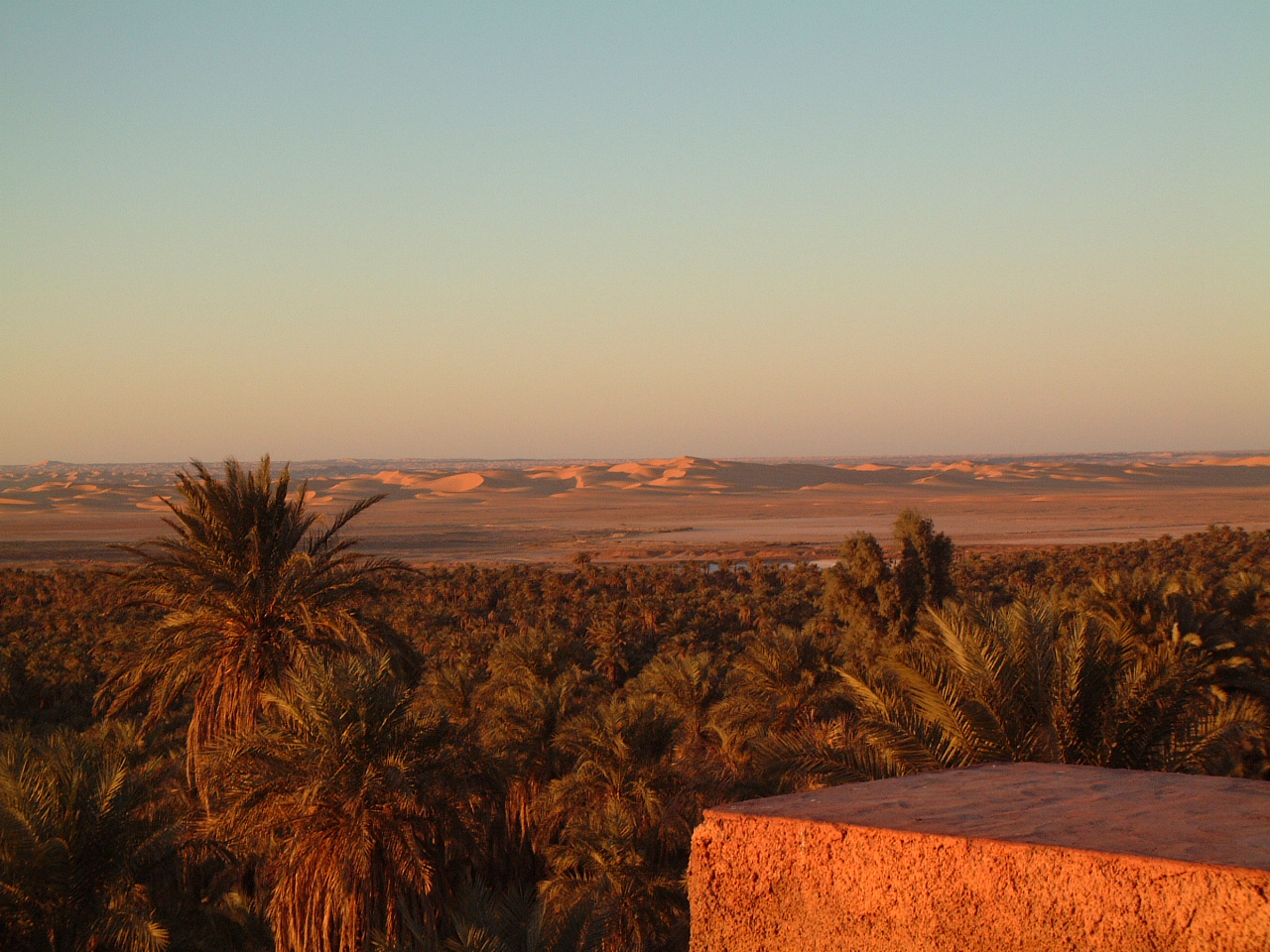
Algerian side of the Grand Erg Oriental

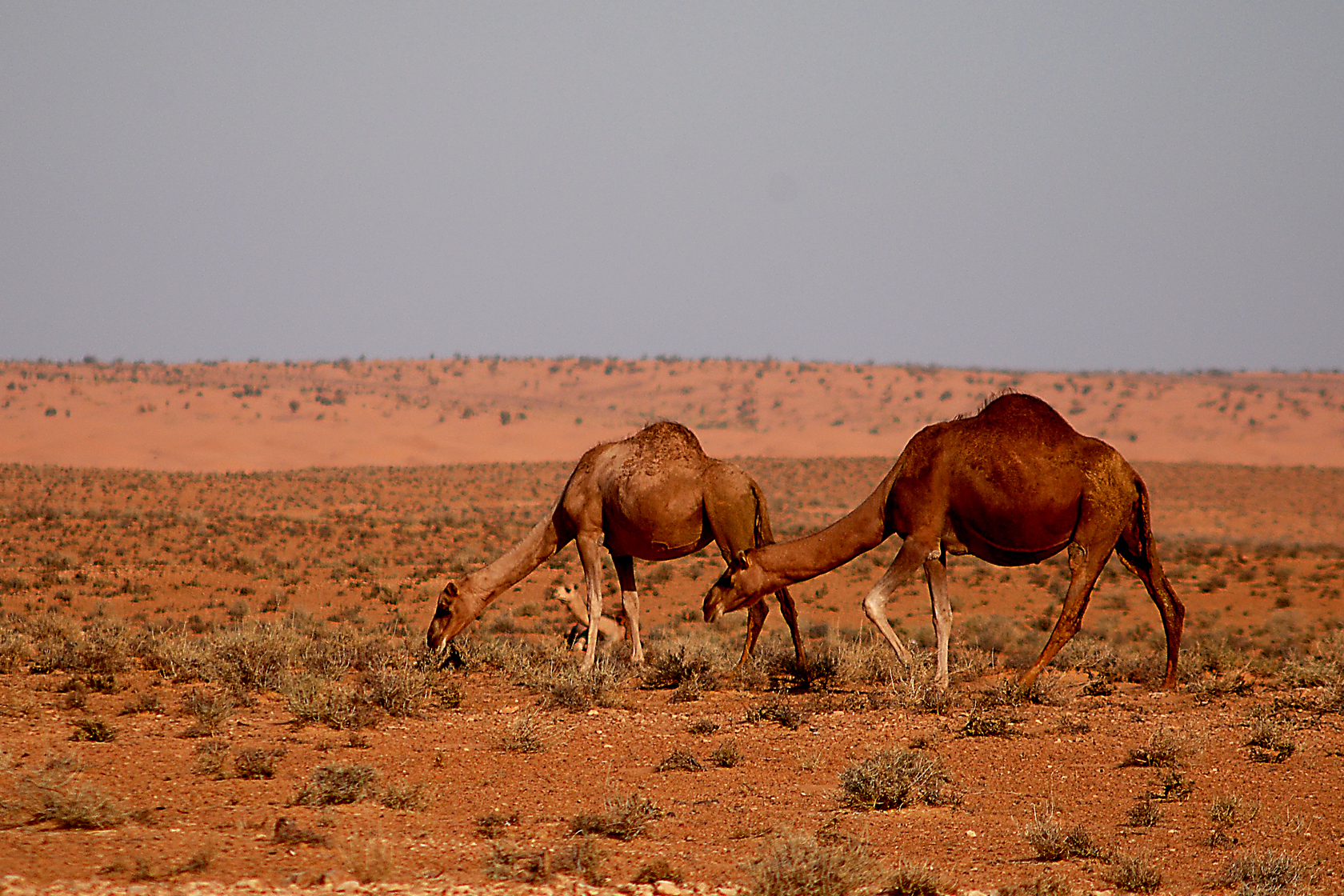
Sahara desert, Tunisia

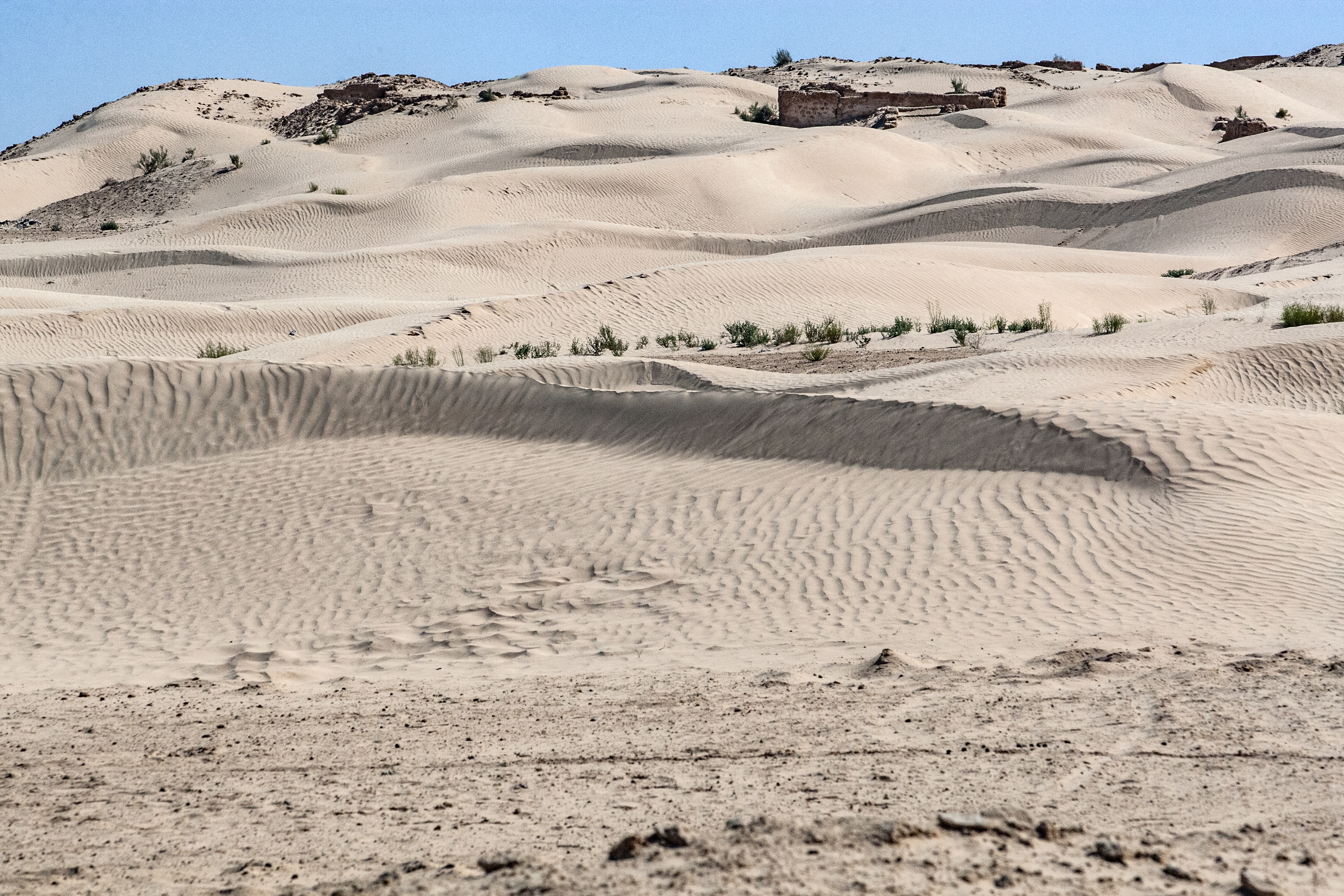
Dune landscape near Douz, Tunisia

== See also ==
- Grand Erg Oriental
