= Erg Tiffernine =

Sand sea in the Sahara

- Issaouane n'Tifernine
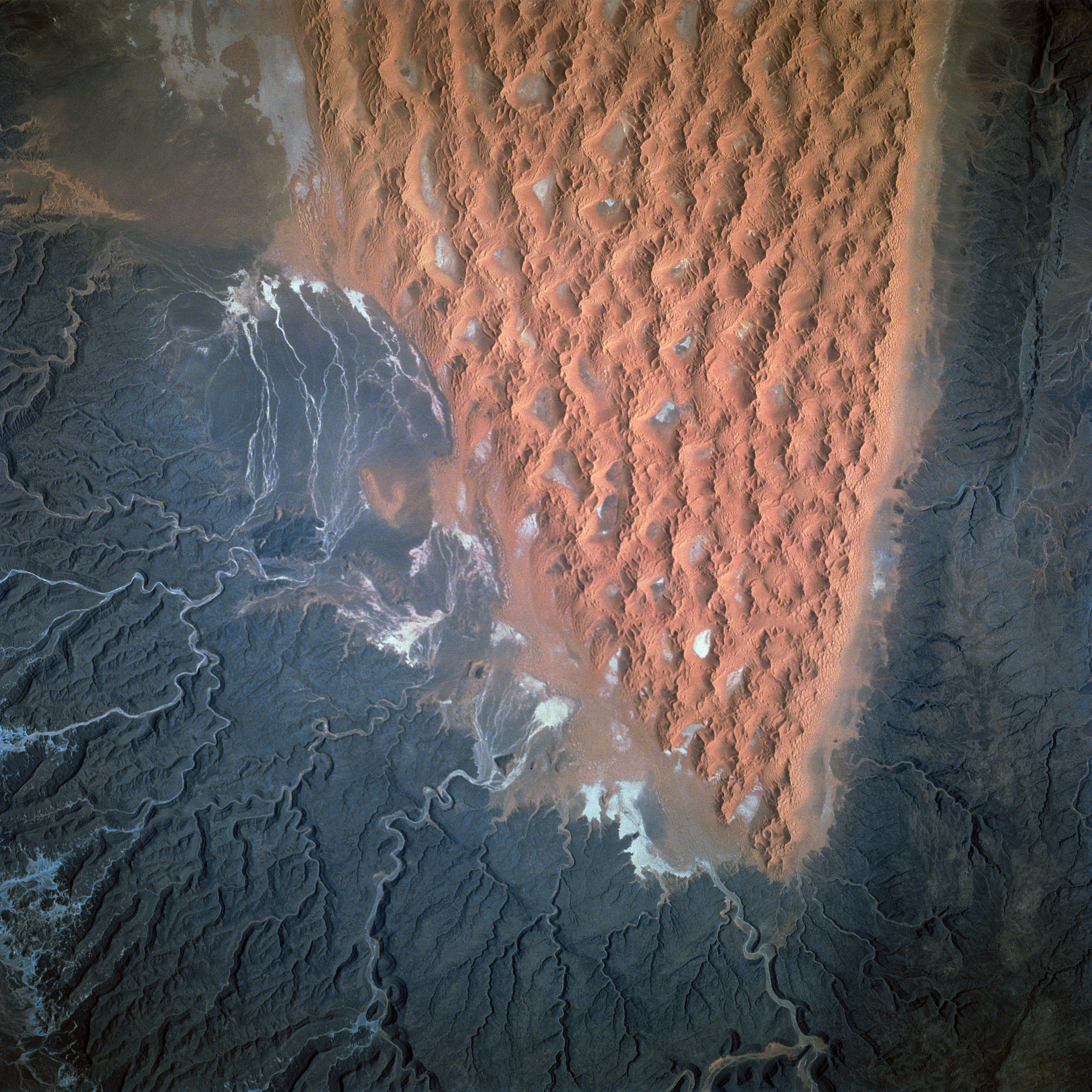
- Erg Tiffernine seen from the NASA Space Shuttle (north is to the right)

- Location within Algeria
- Floor elevation: 400–530 m (1,310–1,740 ft)
- Length: 150 km (93 mi) (N - S)
- Width: 47 km (29 mi) (W - E)
- Area: 4,800 km^{2} (1,900 mi^{2})

Geology
- Type: Dunes
- Age: Pleistocene

Geography
- Country: Algeria
- State: Wilaya Illizi
- Borders on: Tassili n'Ajjer
- Coordinates: 26°45′00″N 6°40′0″E
- Interactive map of Erg Tiffernine
- Dunes up to 420 m high - the highest in the Sahara

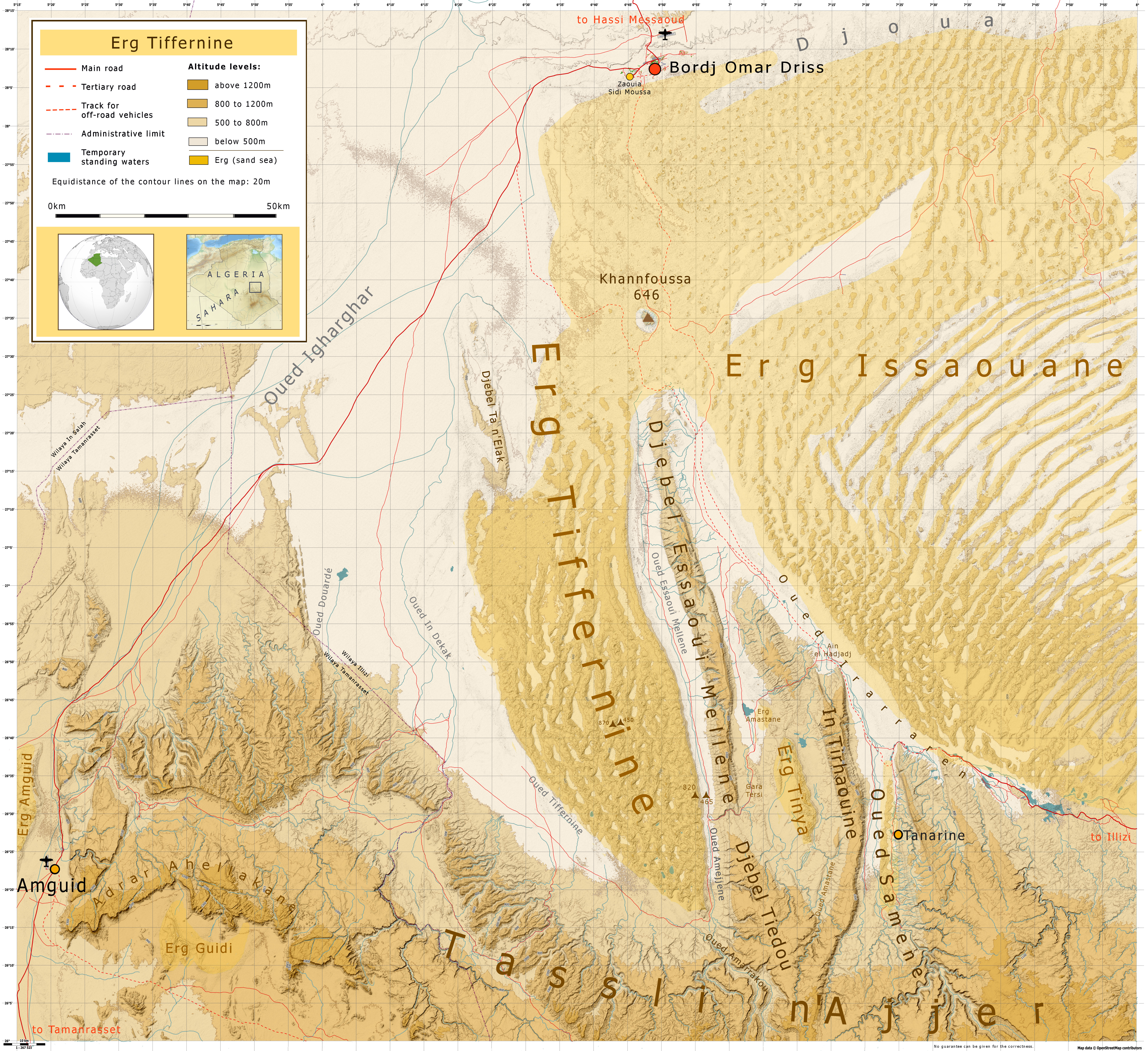
Map of Erg Tiffernine and surrounding area

Erg Tiffernine (also known as Erg Tifernine or Issaouane n'Tifernine) is a sand sea (erg) in the Sahara located Illizi Province in southeastern Algeria.

== Formation and evolution ==
At the end of the Pliocene epoch, about 2.5 million years ago, the Sahara had a humid tropical climate. During this period, the waters of the Tassili n'Ajjer massif carried large amounts of rock material down its northern slope into the basin that would later become the Erg Tiffernine. There, it was deposited as sand. During the Pleistocene, about 1.6 million years ago, the erg began to form during periods of drought. This process continued during the dry periods of the Holocene, up until about 3,000 years ago. The formation of the dunes was the work of the wind, which in earlier epochs blew much stronger than it does today. This is how the megadunes in the Erg Tiffernine were formed, something that would no longer be possible under today’s wind conditions. During these periods, considerable amounts of sand were also transported from the north, primarily from the southwestern part of the Grand Erg Oriental. In an initial phase, longitudinal dunes formed along the prevailing wind direction from the north. Later, the wind regime changed, and star dunes emerged on top of the longitudinal dunes. These form under weaker winds from varying directions. On the flanks of these compound dunes, other smaller dunes emerged, which are mobile. In addition, other dunes formed in the spaces between the longitudinal dunes, interrupted by sebkhas, so that a network-like structure developed in the southern half.

== Topography ==
With an area of approximately 4,800 km². Erg Tiffernine is an extension of the much larger Erg Issaouane to the east, to which it is connected by a narrow corridor approximately 16 km wide.

Erg Tiffernine has a characteristic amphora shape, making it easily identifiable on satellite images. It extends approximately 150 km from north to south and reaches a maximum width of 47 km. To the southwest, south, and east, the erg is framed by the westernmost foothills of the Tassili n'Ajjer massif. To the northeast, it extends into the Erg Issaouane. The northwest boundary is formed by the wide Oued Igharghar.

The surrounding area and the rocky base of the Erg Tiffernine have an altitude of between 400 and 530 m. The dunes that have formed there are the highest in the entire Sahara, reaching heights of up to 420 m. The volume of sand in the erg is approximately 340 km³. Spread evenly over the entire surface of the erg, this would give a height of about 70 m. The fact that such quantities of sand have accumulated here is also due to the fact that the flanks of the mountains that frame the erg from the southwest to the northeast act as a funnel without drainage. Under the prevailing wind conditions, this has created a situation of congestion for the sand. This is why its sediment balance is positive.

The highest dune ridges reach 870 m. Inside the erg, numerous deep depressions without drainage (sebkhas) have formed, without sand cover, whose altitude corresponds to that of the erg's frame. It is clear that there is no elevation of solid ground under the sand dunes of the Erg Tiffernine.

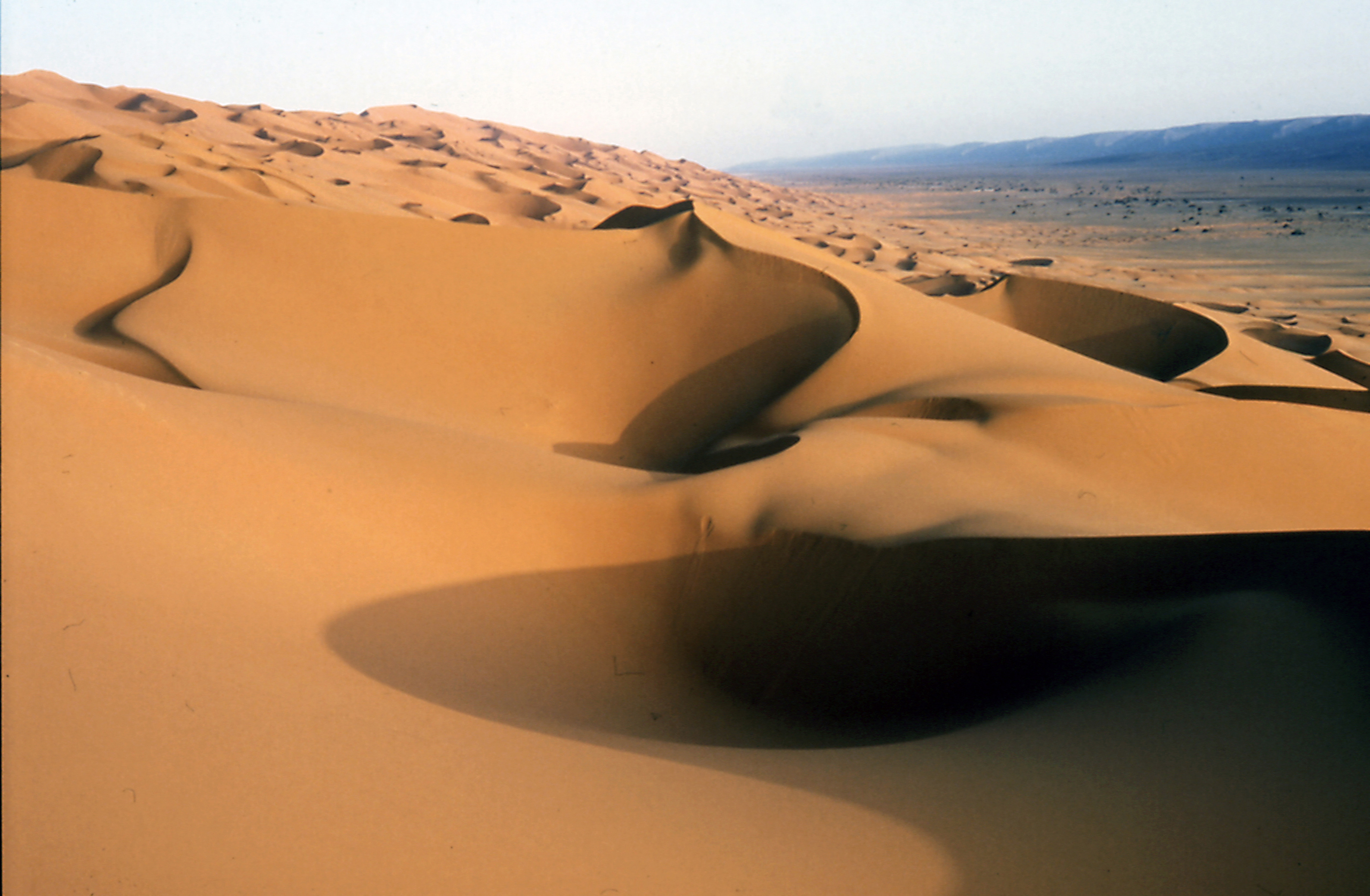
Slope of the eastern complex dune of the erg, covered with mobile dunes. On the right: Oued Essaoui Mellene.

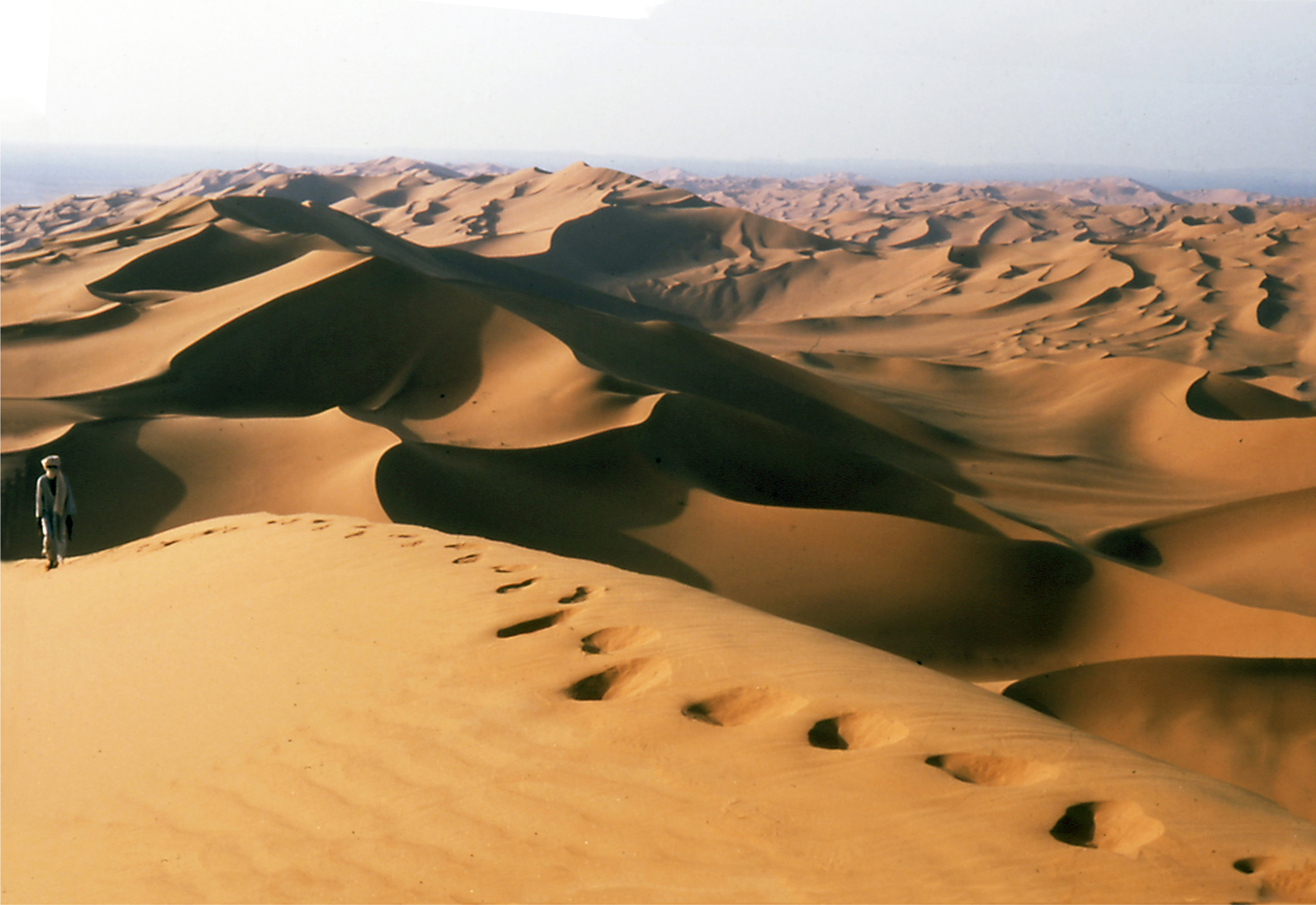
View from the eastern dune towards the south

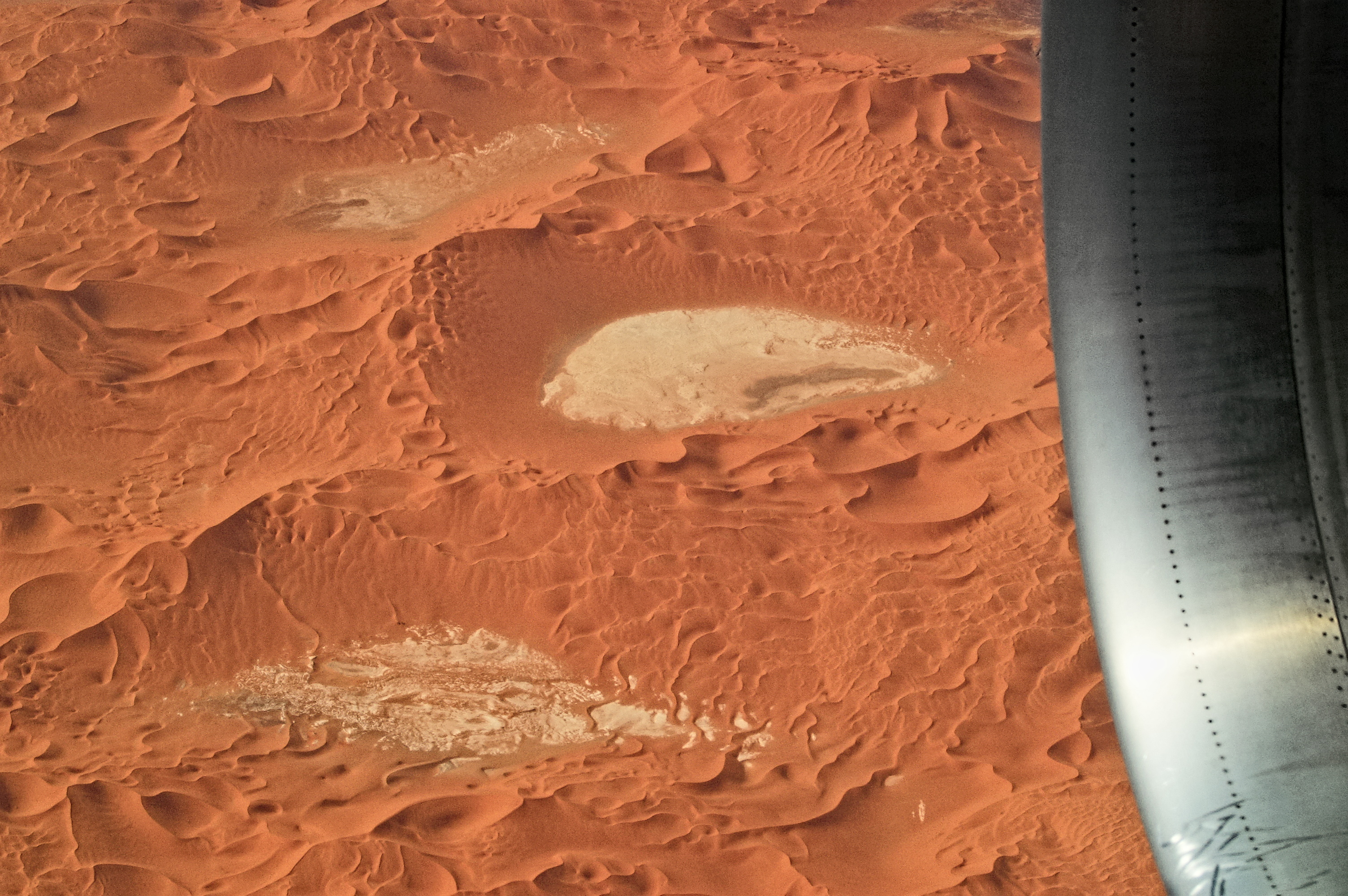
Erg Tiffernine: dunes and depressions without drainage (sebkhas)

== Settlement ==
There are no settlements or transport routes within the erg. A track for off-road vehicles runs along the east and south sides of the erg. In the southern part, there are a few burial mounds (tumuli) on the rocky base of the sebkhas, evidence of Neolithic settlement. At the foot of the eastern flank, neolithic millstones and associated grinder have been spotted, indicating that grain was ground there.

== Vegetation ==
With the exception of a few isolated trees in the sebkhas, Erg Tiffernine is completely devoid of vegetation.

== See also ==
- Issaouane Erg
- Grand Erg Oriental
- Sahara Desert
- Geography of Algeria
- Erg
- Dune
- List of ergs
