= Issaouane Erg =

- Issaouane-N-Irarraren
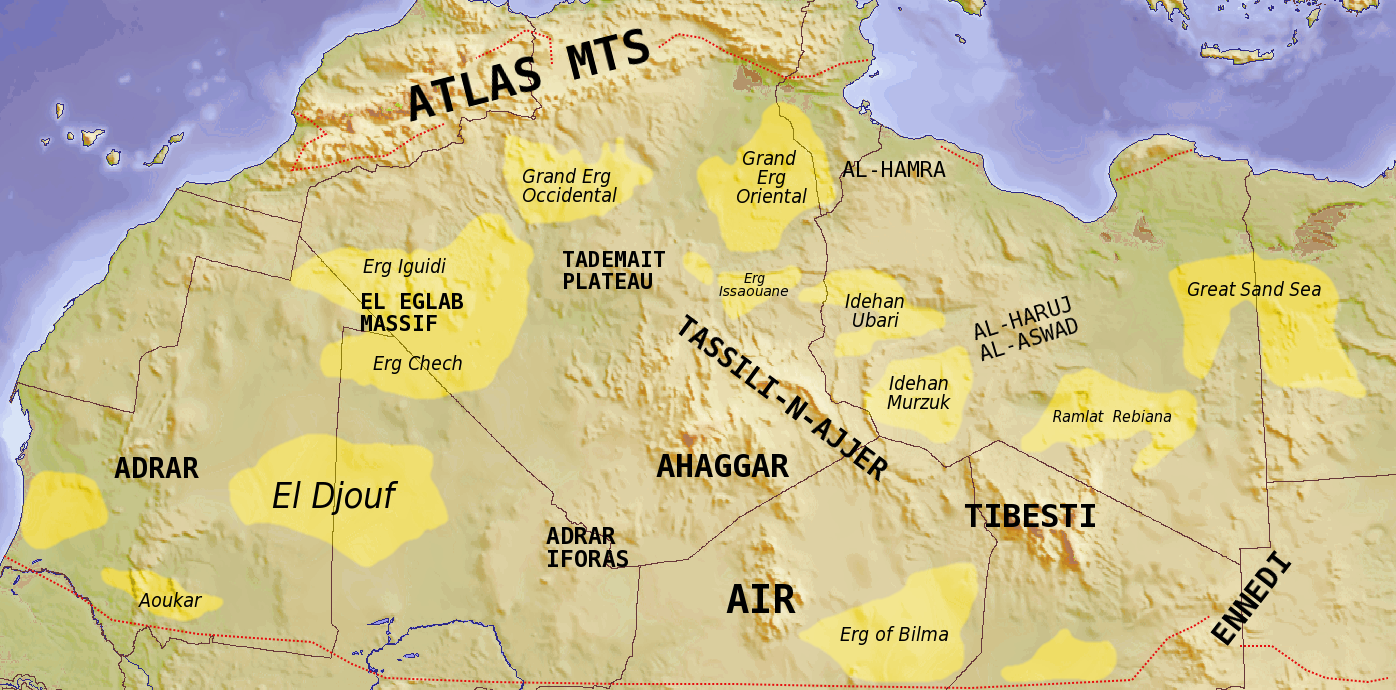
- Saharan topographic elements map, Issaouane Erg to the right of center

- Location within Algeria
- Floor elevation: 370–570 m (1,210–1,870 ft)
- Length: 240 km (150 mi) (N - S)
- Width: 250 km (160 mi) (W - E)
- Area: 26,000 km^{2} (10,000 mi^{2})

Geology
- Type: Dunes
- Age: Pleistocene

Geography
- Country: Algeria
- State: Wilaya Illizi
- Borders on: Tassili n'Ajjer
- Coordinates: 27°34′23″N 7°40′55″E
- Interactive map of Issaouane Erg

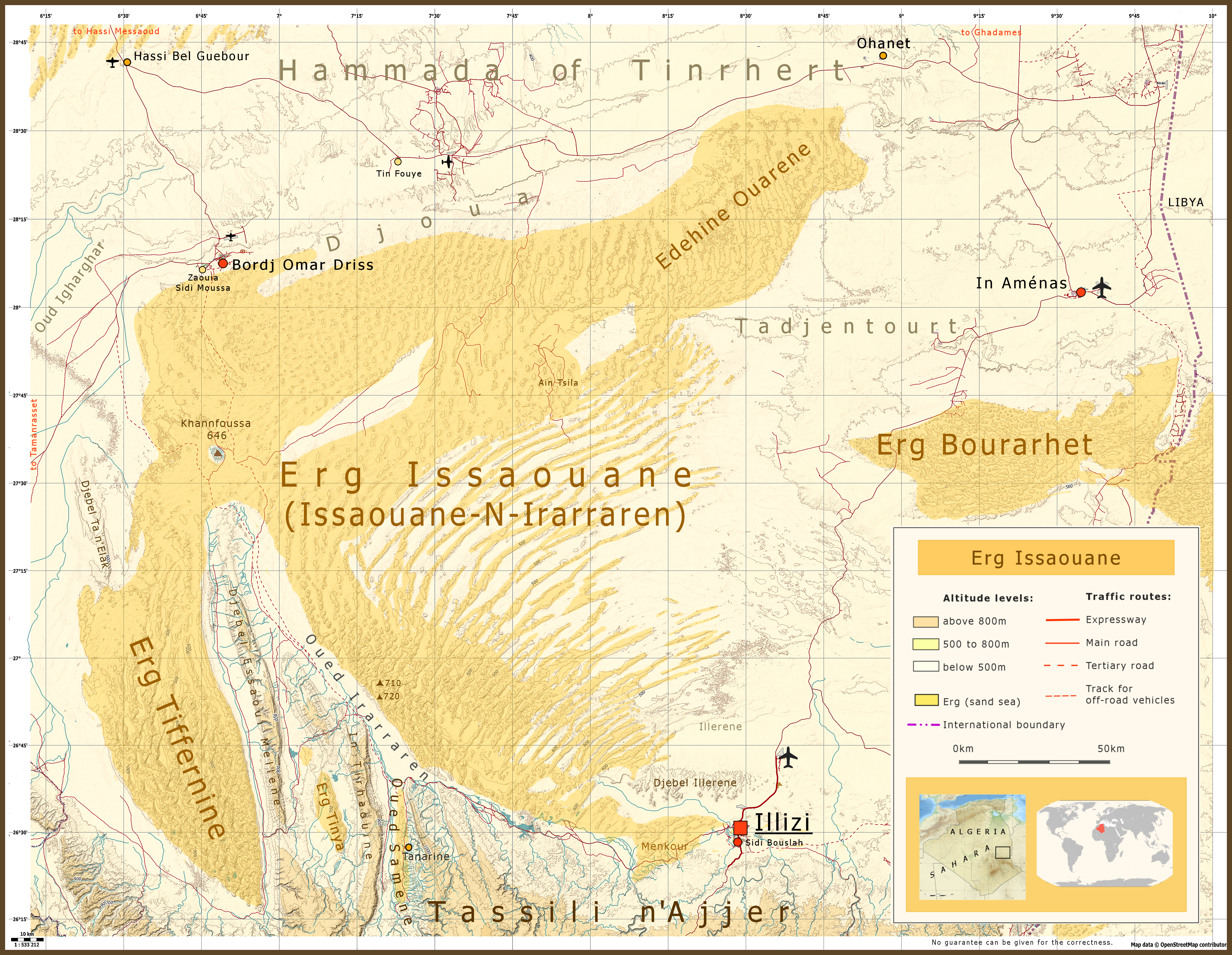
Map of Issaouane Erg and surroundings in Southeast Algeria

The Issaouane Erg (also called Issaouane-N-Irarraren) is an erg (sand sea) in Algeria's portion of the Sahara desert, covering an area of approximately 26,000 km^{2} (10,000 sq mi).

== Formation and development ==
Towards the end of the Pliocene epoch, 2.5 million years ago, when the Sahara had a humid tropical climate, the waters of the Tassili n'Ajjer carried large amounts of rock material into the Illizi basin, where it was deposited as sand. During the dry periods of the Pleistocene and Holocene, 1.6 million years ago to about 3,000 years ago, the dunes of the Issaouane Erg formed within this basin. At that time, wind speeds were much higher at certain times, resulting in higher dunes than would be possible today. The presence of both longitudinal and barchan dunes (which form due to unidirectional winds with minor deviations) with star dunes atop (which form when winds from various directions deposit sand) suggests that wind regimes have changed over time. The formation of these stationary complex dunes can take hundreds of thousands of years, while changes in wind patterns can also take thousands of years until new dune formations have been created.. The sediment balance of the erg is positive except in the southeastern part with the long dunes, where the erg loses sand.

== Topography ==
The Issaouane Erg is located north of the mountain range Tassili n'Ajjer. To the east, it borders Erg Bourarhet and the Idehan Ubari sand sea, Libya and in the north, the Issaouane Erg ends at the Tinrhert Plateau. To the west lies the smaller Erg Tiffernine, connected to it by a narrow passage 47 km wide. To a large extent it follows the 500-m contour of the surrounding landscape. The northern section features compound dunes (linear dunes with secondary dunes on top), sometimes also star dunes. Between the dunes (which are red from iron oxide) are depressions covered with sand and sabkhah (salt flats), left after the evaporation of accumulated water. The southern half consists of linear dunes, up to 120 km long, often 2 to 3 km wide, with secondary dunes on top. Their orientation from northeast to southwest indicates the prevailing wind direction (northwest trade winds) at the time of their formation. In between are gassi, which are sand-free areas with reg (gravel desert) or salty clayed crust soils. The highest dunes of the erg rise up on its southwestern edge, where the sand has accumulated. Two dunes rise 270 m above the bedrock. In the northwest of the erg, there is a hill that protrudes from the erg: Khannfoussa, 646 m high and about 200 m above the surrounding bedrock.

== Climate ==
Data from Bordj Omar Driss:

The climate is classified as BWh by the Köppen-Geiger (Hot desert climate)

- Average temperature of coldest month: January, 11°C
- Average temperature of hottest month: July, 35°C

Data from Issaouane Erg:

- Average precipitation: 25 mm/year
- Annual evapotranspiration is estimated at 22 mm/year.
- Most likely precipitation: December, January
- The driest months: July, August
- Predominant wind and direction of the current sand flow : from the southwest or west

== Settlements, routes ==
There are no settlements within the erg. Close to the edge of the erg, in the northwest, is the town of Bordj Omar Driss (population approx. 2,760 in 2020), a few kilometers west of which is Zaouia Sidi Moussa (population approx. 300). In the southeast, the city of Illizi (population approx. 13,300 in 2020) borders the erg. Within the erg, there are tracks and roads leading to oil production areas, some of which are already covered in sand again. The CW2 route leads from Illizi along the edge of the erg through the Oued Irarraren to the northwest. Later, it turns north and leads to Bordj Omar Driss. However, the last 180 km or so are still unpaved (as of 2025), so they are only passable with off-road vehicles.

== Prehistory and History ==
Neolithic artifacts, sculptures and paintings have been found in the Issouane Erg from the Kiffian culture. Hand axes from the Acheulean period were also found. In the 19th century, and probably even earlier, a trade route led through the erg, following a path from Ouargla through the Grand Erg Oriental via Zaouia Sidi Moussa (then known as Temassinine) and through the erg to the southeast. It continued eastward via the Oued Irarraren and finally ended in Ghat (southeastern Libya), the junction of the great caravan route between Tripoli and the Sahel. During that century, there were many rezzous (raids by looters) by the Tuareg of the Kel Ajjer on the Chaambas, an Arab ethnic group further north, and vice versa, using this route. Both used to visit the zaouia in Temassinine, a Muslim tomb, to ask for success or to give thanks. In 1880, French Colonel Paul Flatters was traveling along this route on a scientific expedition. The aim was to explore a possible route for the planned Trans-Saharan railway line. In 1904, the French Fort Flatters was built east of Temassinine, and in 1909, Fort Polignac was built near what later became Illizi. Transport caravans now regularly traveled this route, loaded with supplies.

== Natural resources ==
There are two large natural gas and oil fields south of Bordj Omar Driss: Tin Fouye Tabankort oil and gas field and Ain Tsila oil and gas field. More small oil fields are also being exploited in the same area. A natural gas and a liquefied gas pipeline also run from the Libyan border through this area towards Hassi Messaoud.

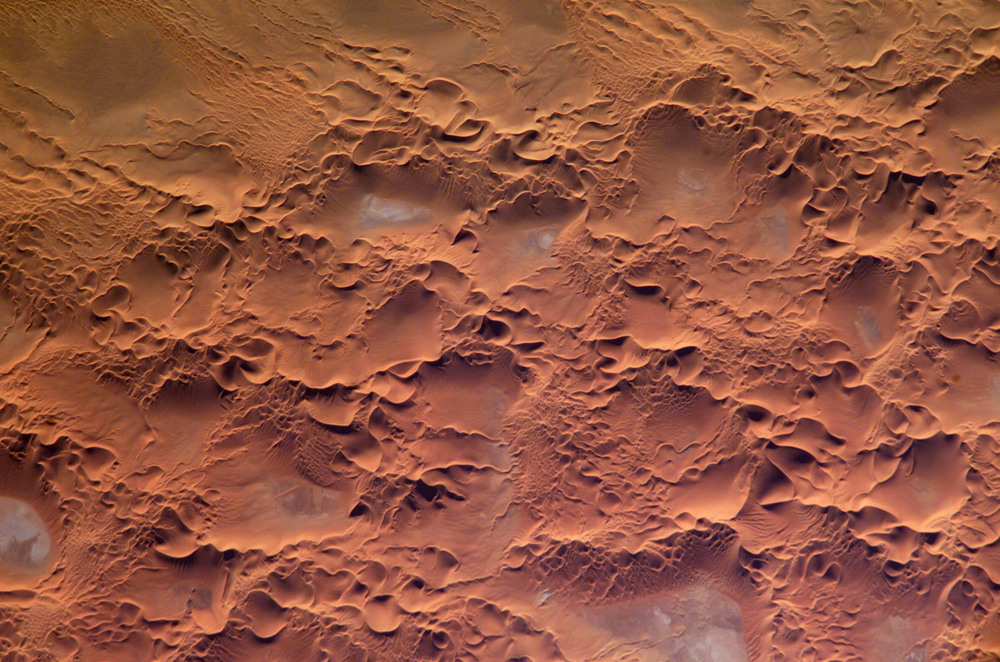
International Space Station: Complex dunes and sabkhah of Issaouane Erg

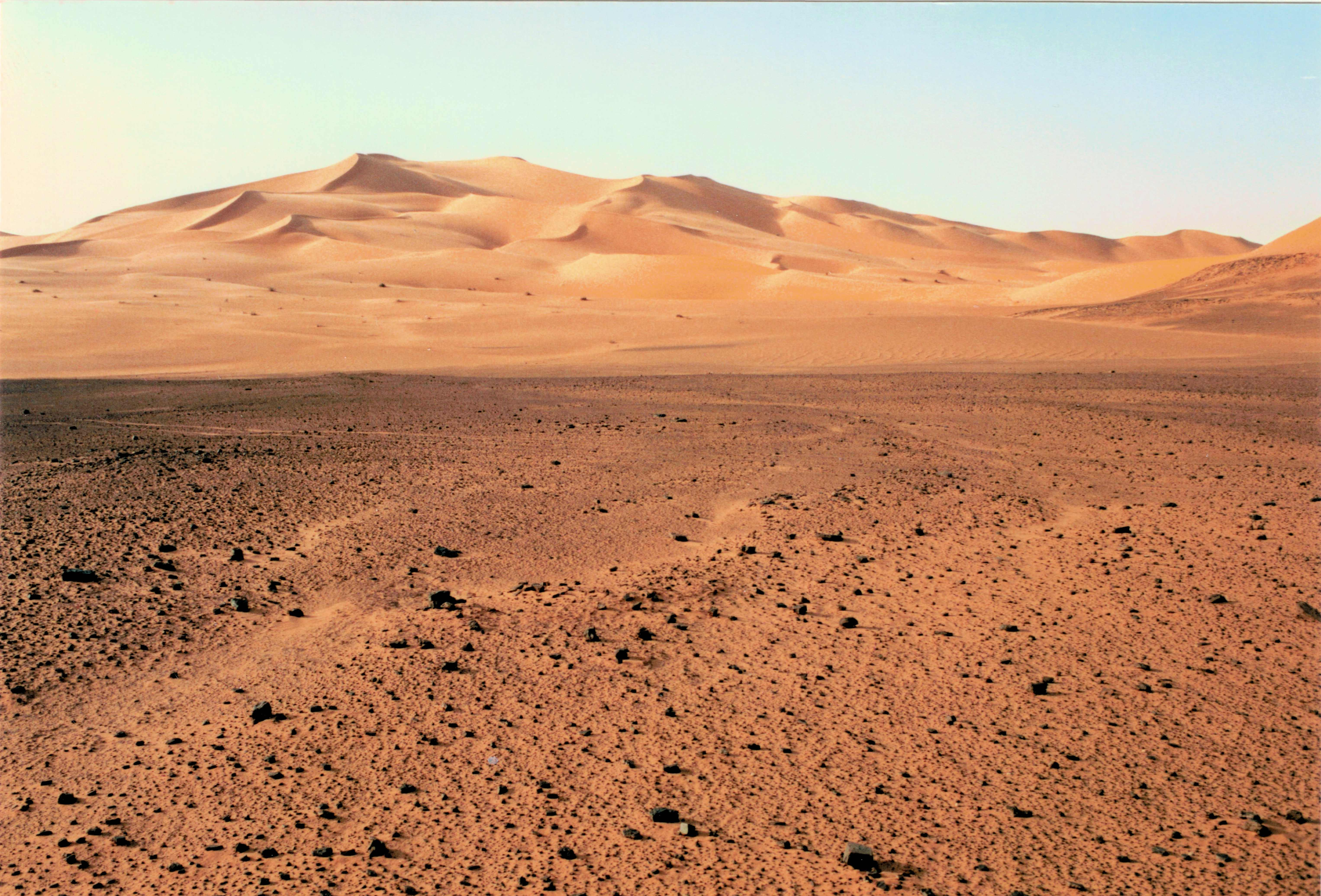
Reg and star dune on the southern edge of Erg Issaouane

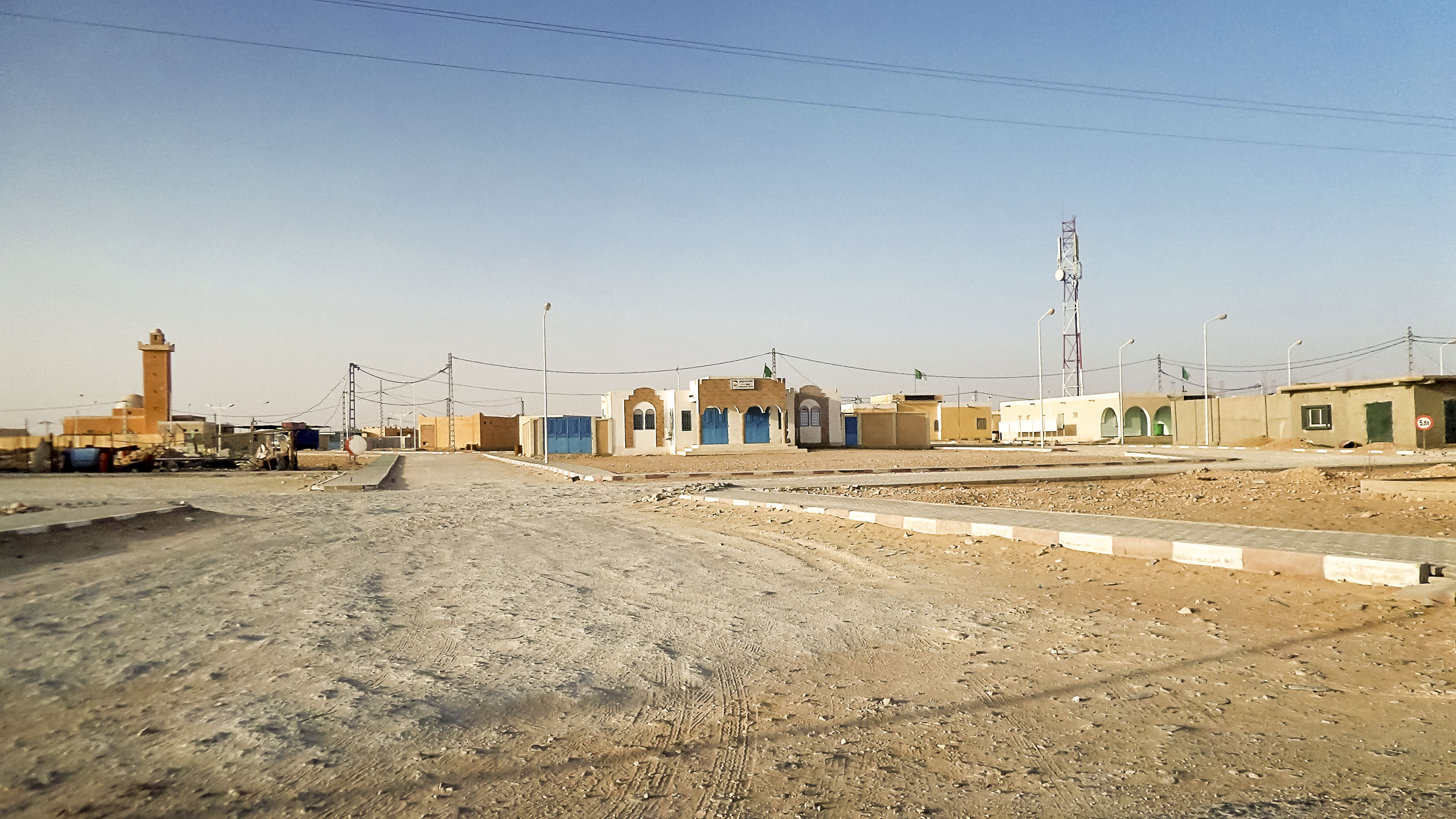
TFT - base camp Tin Fouye Tabankort gas and oil field

== See also ==
- Erg Tiffernine
- Geography of Algeria
- List of ergs
