= Sabkha Zamoul =

Lake in Oum El Bouaghi Province, Algeria

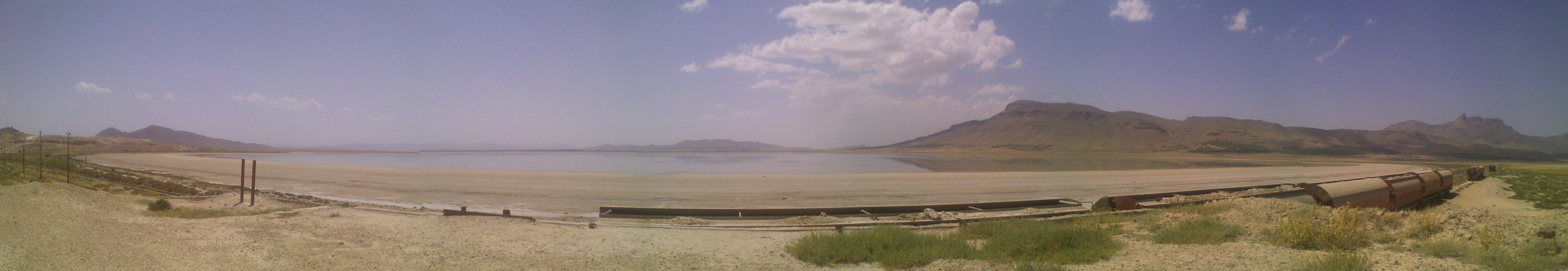
- Photo of the lake and the railroad that crosses it
- Location: Algeria
- Coordinates: 6°19′12″N 12°31′35″E

Location
- Interactive map of Sabkha Zamoul

Sabkha Zamoul is a salt lake situated in the northeastern region of Algeria, within the administrative boundaries of the Oum El Bouaghi Province and the Ouled Zouaï municipality. It has been partially exploited for salt extraction and represents the largest nesting area for flamingos in the Mediterranean. The site encompasses an area of 6,765 hectares and is included on the Ramsar Convention list.

== Geography ==
=== Topography, geology and hydrography ===
The site is situated within a natural depression on sedimentary terrain, which is characterised by saline soils and soft silt. The topography is shaped by the mountains that encircle the lake. Of particular note are the mountains of Hanout Kabir (1100 meters), El Kantas Ali (997 meters), Kadia El Kalab (1016 meters), Little Tarbent (1062 meters), and Tarbent (1124 meters). The lake is replenished by precipitation that percolates through an 8,900-hectare catchment area, and the site also functions as a repository for wastewater from a number of smaller neighboring communities.

=== Location ===
The lake is situated on National Road 3, which connects Aïn M'lila to Batna. It is located 17 kilometers south of Aïn M'lila city and 10 kilometers east of Souk Naamane municipality, near the Tinselt Shatt. This site was classified as a Ramsar site in 2004. The southern shore of the lake is situated at a distance of 200 meters from the municipality of Ouled Zouaï. The districts of Souk Naamane and Aïn Kechra District in Oum El Bouaghi assume administrative responsibility for Sabkha Zamoul.

=== Climate ===
The site is situated within a climate zone that is classified as semi-arid to arid, with precipitation levels ranging from 100 to 400 mm per year. Additionally, the lake is regarded as a component of a wetland system. The climate of this region is characterized by cold, rainy winters, with a minimum temperature of 2.9 degrees Celsius, and hot, dry summers, with the potential for droughts lasting six months or more. The maximum temperature reached during the summer months is 36.9 degrees Celsius. The predominant winds in the northwest and west are characterized by irregular and heavy precipitation, often resulting in flooding. In contrast, the winds originating from the south are typically dry and characterized by high temperatures.

== Flora and fauna ==
The lake serves as a nesting site for flamingos, with an estimated 10,000 pairs and 16,000 chicks observed in September 2009. In mid-September, the flamingos commence their annual migration to their wintering sites in Oued Righ. In collaboration with the biological station of Tour de Valla and the forestry governorate of Oum El Bouaghi, the University of Annaba has conducted monitoring and protection activities for the flamingos, resulting in the colonization of an island measuring 0.9 hectares in the lake by 8,500 pink flamingos.

In 2005, the number of common shelduck reached 1,400 individuals, representing 6.4% of the total number of this species in the Mediterranean region.

Additionally, the region is home to a number of other notable species, including northern shoveler, white storks, pied avocet, common cranes, black-headed gull, black-winged stilt, eurasian curlew, little stint, kentish plover, and gull-billed tern. In addition to birds of prey such as the buzzard, black kite, common kestrel, peregrine falcon, and lesser kestrel.

The only mammalian species that inhabit the vicinity of wetlands are wild boar, jackals, red foxes, hares, and rats.

With regard to invertebrates, two types of crustacean can be identified. The two types of crustaceans are the Nematostella vectensis and the Branchinella spinos. The flora surrounding the lake consists of agricultural crops and salt-tolerant vegetation.

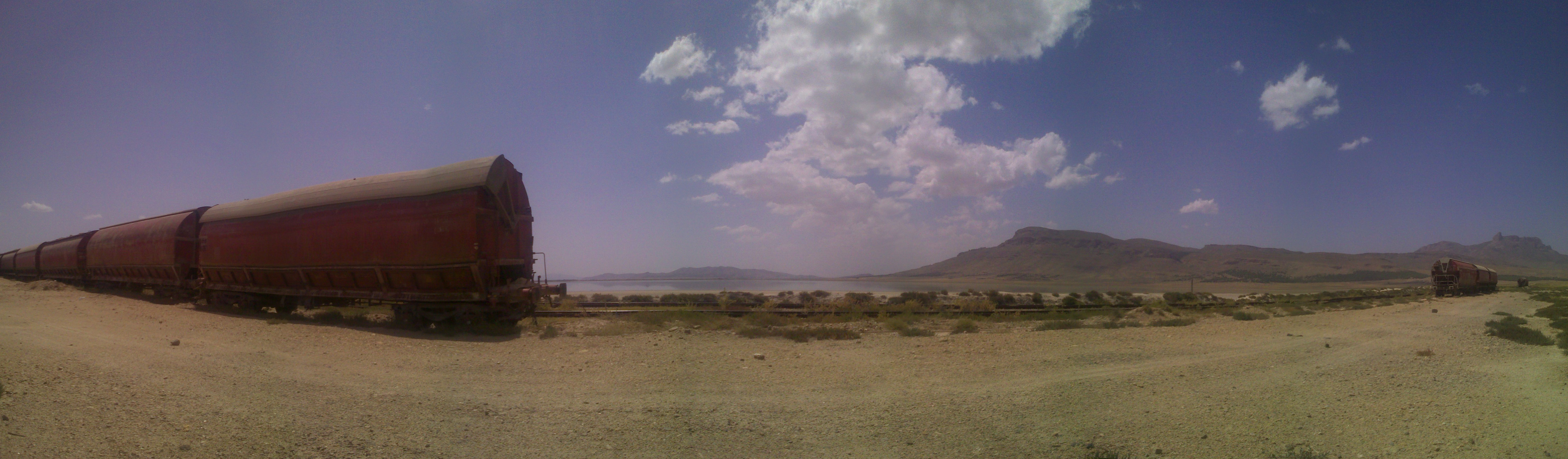
Sabkha Zamoul
