= List of cities in Algeria =

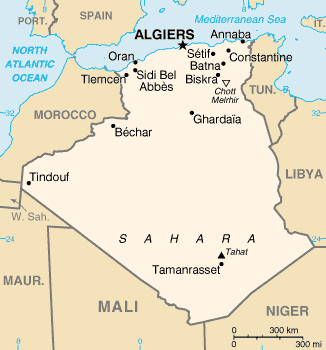
Map of Algeria

This article lists the cities of Algeria with a population above 50,000, starting with the most populated city.

The population of an urban area, according to the 2008 census, consists of those living in the geographical area limited by its urban perimeter and does not take into account the scattered population or administrative limits. The main criteria for classifying urban areas used by the NOS are: the size of the area which must exceed 5,000 inhabitants, the administrative rank, and the proportion of the city's activities. According to the categories defined in 2001 and 2006, urban areas are mainly classified according to their population size:

- Metropolis, the municipal or intermunicipal population totals at least 300,000 people. Four cities bear this label: Algiers, Oran, Constantine and Annaba;
- Large city, the total population is at least 100,000 people;
- Medium-sized city, the population is between 50,000 and 100,000 people;
- Small town, the population is between 20,000 and 50,000 people;
- Agglomeration, an urban area with a population of at least 5,000 people.

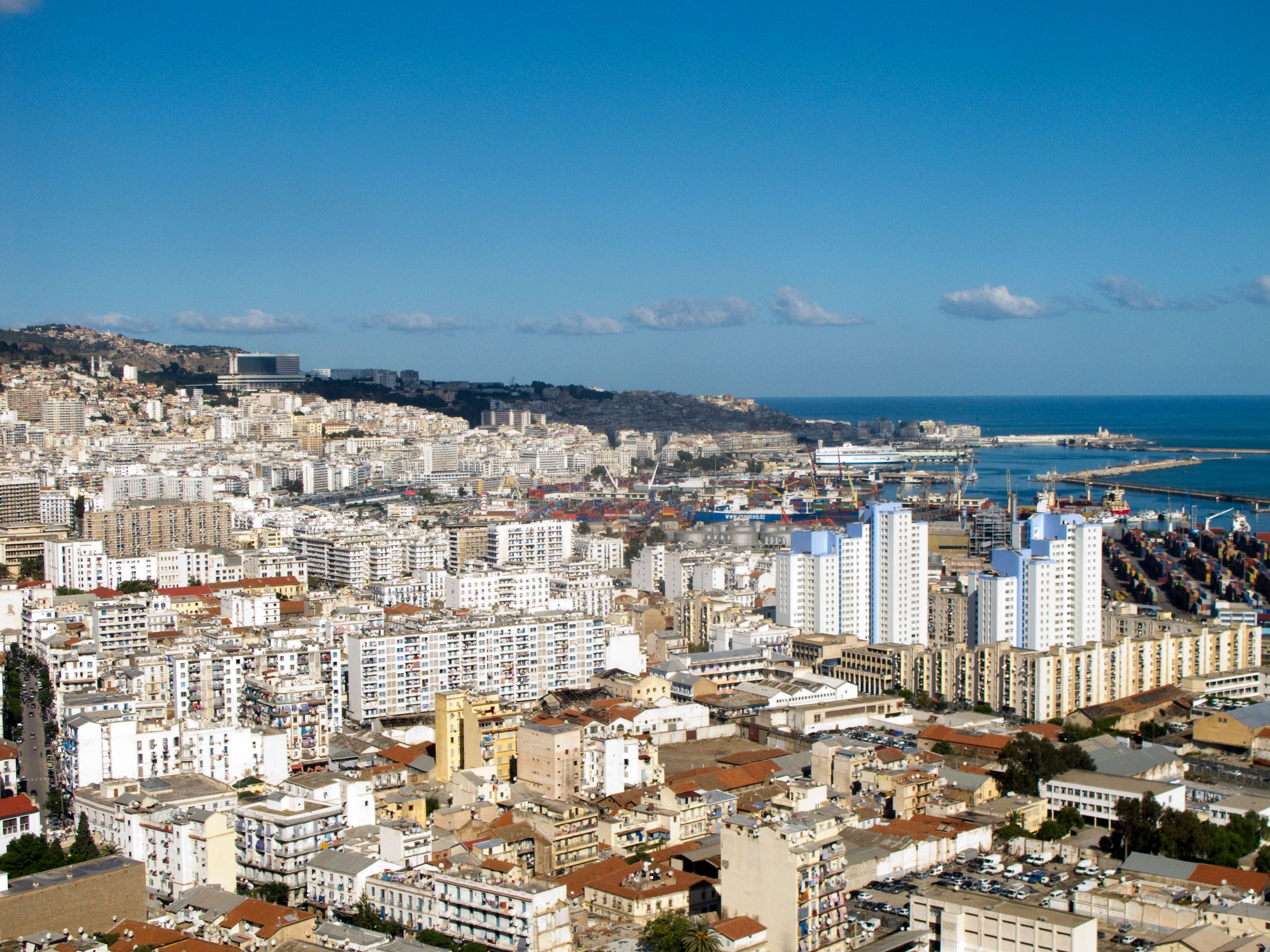
Algiers

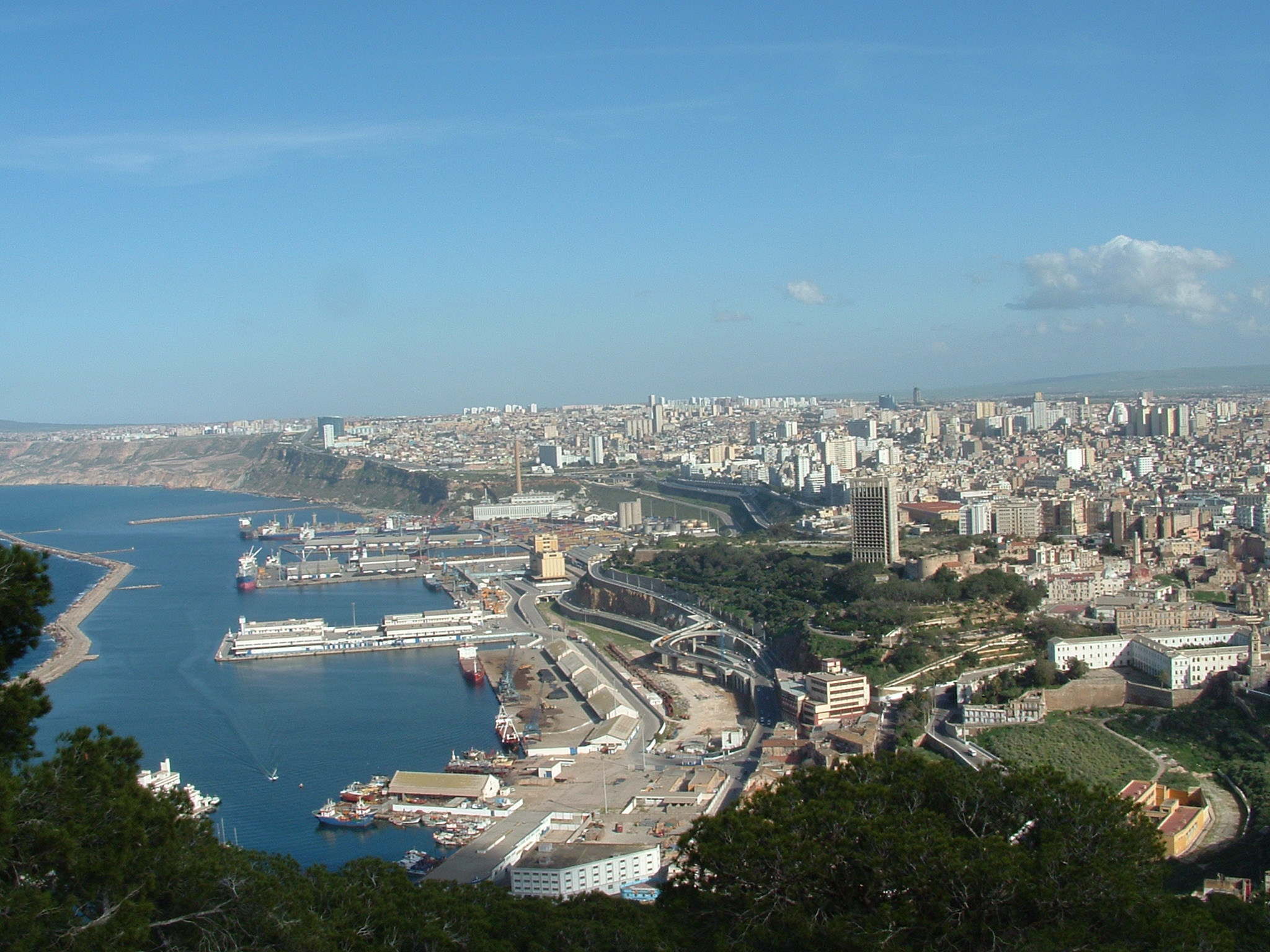
Oran, the second largest city in Algeria

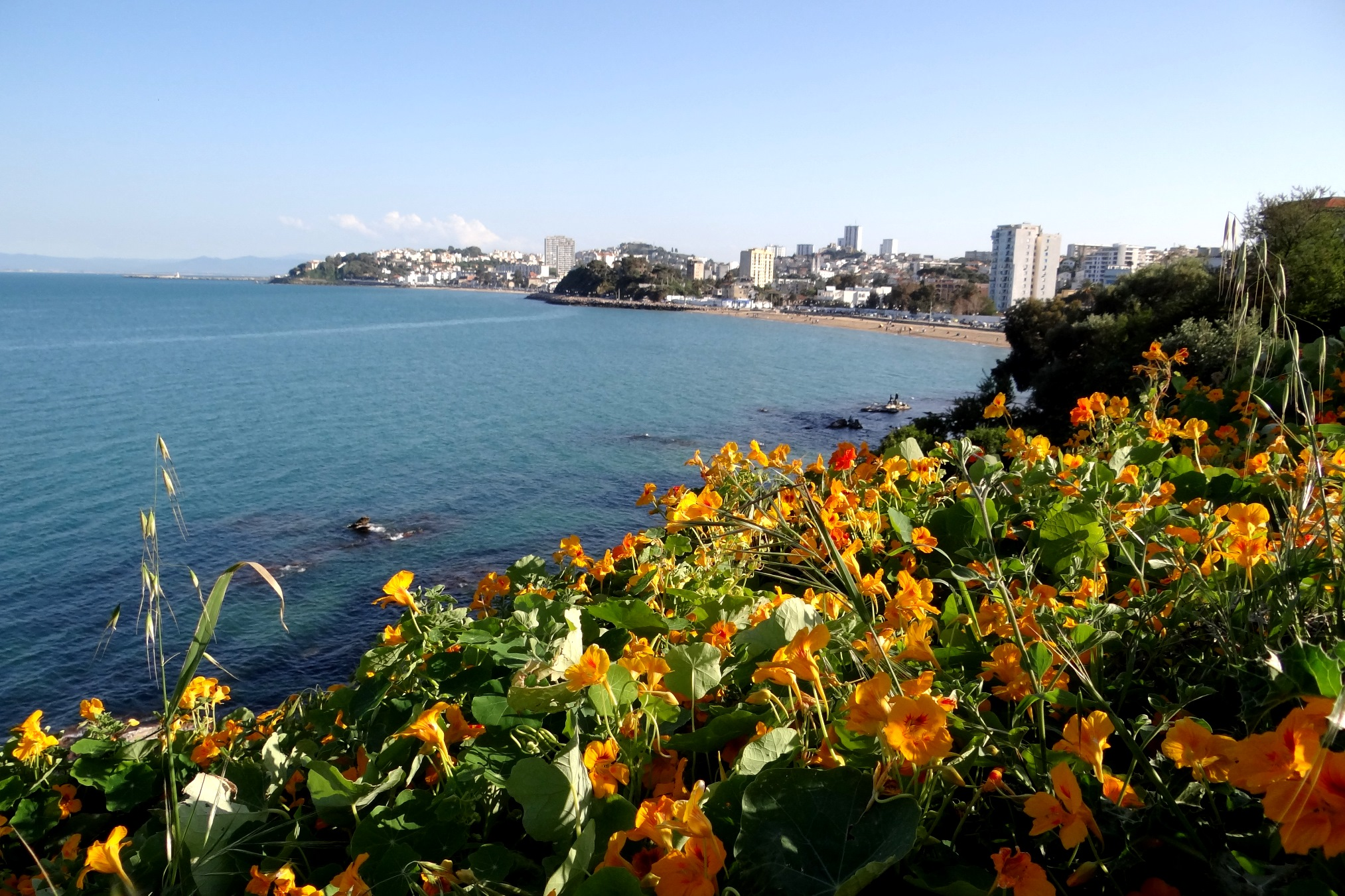
Annaba

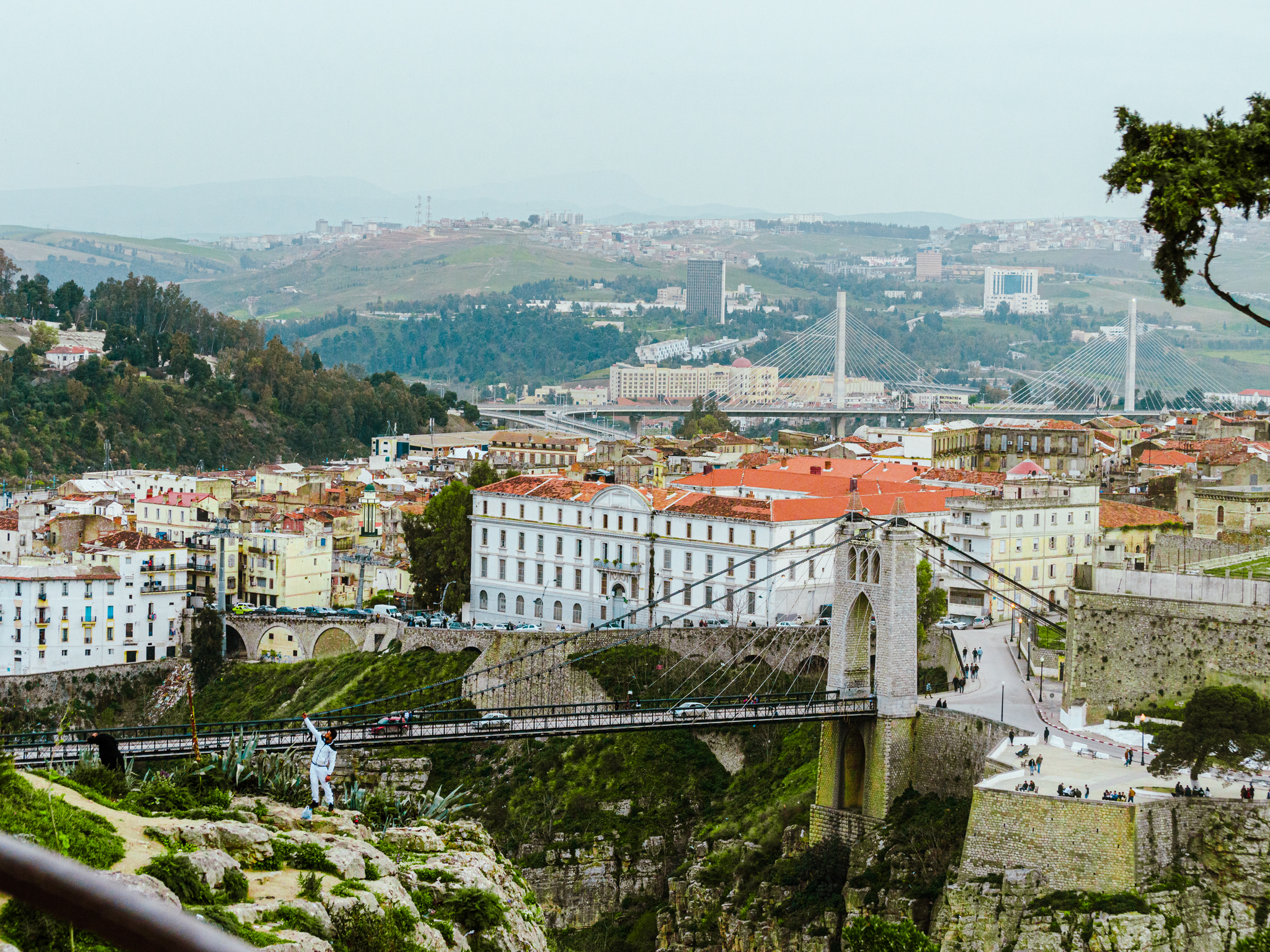
Constantine

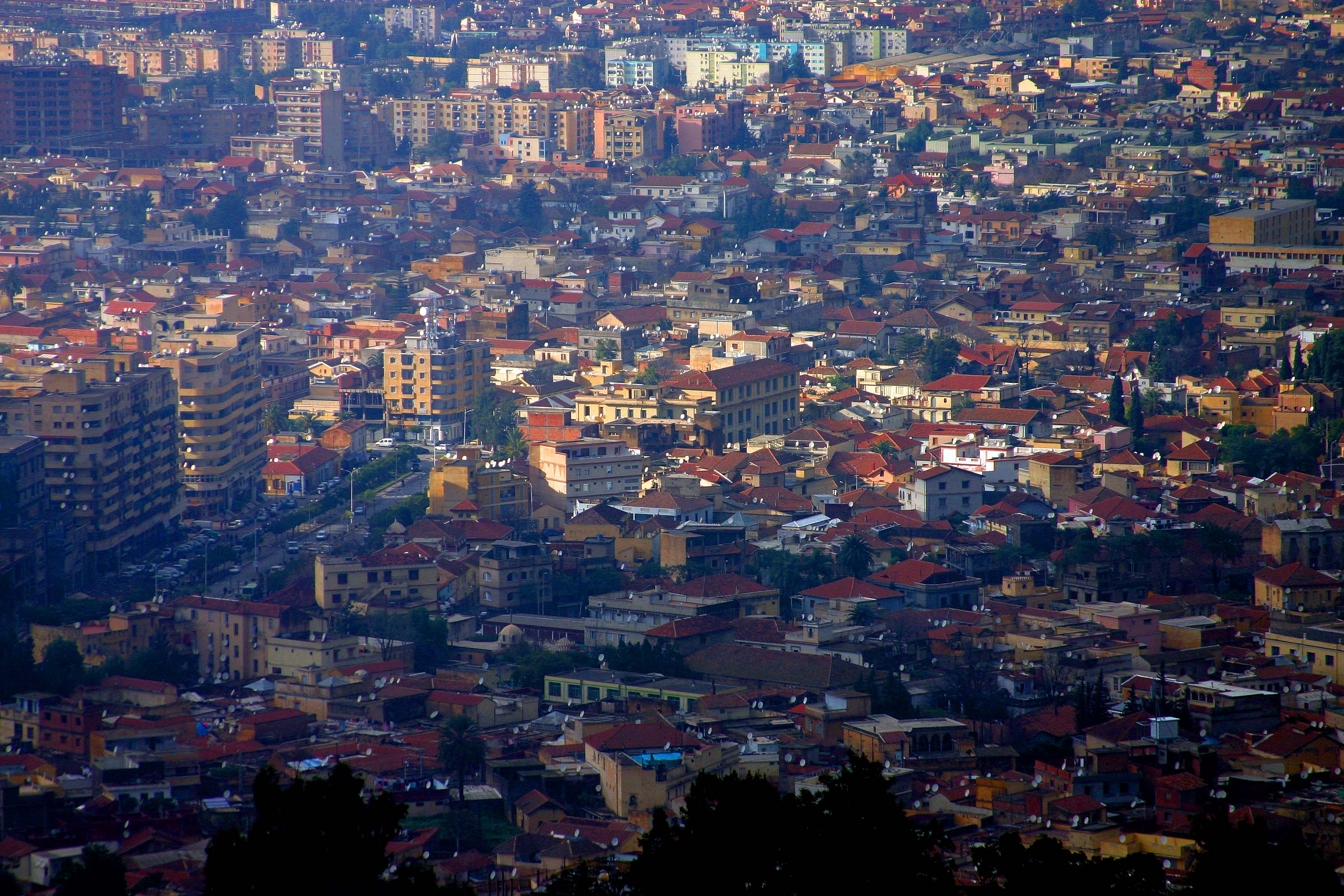
Blida

== List of Algerian cities and towns with more than 100,000 inhabitants ==
This is a list of Algerian cities and towns with more than 100,000 inhabitants, as well as towns and villages with more than 50,000 inhabitants, in alphabetical order according to the 2008 census. For a list of all the 1,541 municipalities (baladiyahs) of Algeria, see the list of municipalities of Algeria.

#		Arabic name	2008 Municipal population	Wilaya
01	Algiers	الجزائر	2,364,230	Algiers
02	Oran	وهران	803,329	Oran
03	Constantine	قسنطينة	448,028	Constantine
04	Annaba	عنابة	342,703	Annaba
05	Blida	البليدة	331,779	Blida
06	Batna	باتنة	289,504	Batna
07	Djelfa	الجلفة	265,833	Djelfa
08	Sétif	سطيف	252,127	Sétif
09	Sidi bel Abbès	سيدي بلعباس	210,146	Sidi bel Abbès
10	Biskra	بسكرة	204,661	Biskra
11	Tébessa	تبسة	194,461	Tébessa
12	Skikda	سكيكدة	182,903	Skikda
13	Tiaret	تيارت	178,915	Tiaret
14	Béjaïa	بجاية	176,139	Béjaïa
15	Tlemcen	تلمسان	173,531	Tlemcen
16	Béchar	بشار	165,241	Béchar
17	Mostaganem	مستغانم	162,885	Mostaganem
18	Bordj Bou Arreridj	برج بوعريريج	158,812	Bordj Bou Arreridj
19	Chlef	الشلف	155,134	Chlef
20	Souk Ahras	سوق أهراس	153,479	Souk Ahras
21	El Eulma	العلمة	145,380	Sétif
22	Médéa	المدية	138,355	Médéa
23	Tizi Ouzou	تيزي وزو	135,088	Tizi Ouzou
24	Jijel	جيجل	134,839	Jijel
25	Laghouat	الأغواط	134,372	Laghouat
26	El Oued	الوادي	134,699	El Oued
27	Ouargla	ورقلة	133,024	Ouargla
28	M'Sila	المسيلة	132,975	M'Sila
29	Relizane	غليزان	130,094	Relizane
30	Saïda	سعيدة	128,413	Saida
31	Bou Saâda	بوسعادة	125,573	M'Sila
32	Guelma	قالمة	120,847	Guelma
33	Aïn Beïda	عين البيضاء	118,662	Oum el Bouaghi
34	Maghnia	مغنية	114,634	Tlemcen
35	Mascara	معسكر	108,587	Mascara
36	Khenchela	خنشلة	108,580	Khenchela
37	Barika	بريكة	104,398	Batna
38	Messaad	مسعد	102,453	Djelfa
39	Aflou	آفلو	102,025	Laghouat
40	Aïn Oussara	عين وسارة	101,239	Djelfa

== List of Algerian cities and towns with 50,000-99,999 inhabitants ==
Contents :	Top - A B C D E F G H I J K L M N O P Q R S T U V W X Y Z

=== A ===
- Adrar (68 276)
- Aïn Defla (65 453)
- Aïn Fakroun (55 282)
- Aïn Oulmene (73 831)
- Aïn M'lila (88 441)
- Aïn Sefra (52 320)
- Aïn Témouchent (75 558)
- Aïn Touta (59 904)
- Akbou (53 282)
- Azzaba (56 922)

=== B ===
- Berrouaghia (60 152)
- Bir el-Ater (77 727)
- Boufarik (71 446)
- Bouira (88 801)

=== C ===
- Chelghoum Laid (82 560)
- Cheria (75 344)
- Chettia (71 490)

=== E ===
- El Bayadh (91 632)
- El Guerrara (59 514)
- El-Khroub (65 344)

=== F ===
- Frenda (54 162)
- Ferdjioua (61 894)

=== G ===
- Ghardaïa (93 423)

=== H ===
- Hassi Bahbah (86 421)

=== K ===
- Khemis Miliana (84 574)
- Ksar Chellala (52 753)
- Ksar Boukhari (67 813)

=== L ===
- Lakhdaria (59 746)
- Larbaâ (83 819)

=== M ===
- Mecheria (66 465)
- Mila (69 052)
- Mohammadia (84 700)

=== O ===
- Oued Rhiou (64 685)
- Ouenza (52 737)
- Ouled Djellal (63 237)
- Ouled Yaïch (87 131)
- Oum El Bouaghi (80 359)

=== R ===
- Ras El Oued (51 482)
- Rouissat (58 112)

=== S ===
- Sédrata (53 218)
- Sidi Aïssa (72 062)
- Sig (70 499)
- Sougueur (78 956)
- Sour El-Ghozlane (50 120)

=== T ===
- Taher (77 367)
- Tamanrasset (54 469)
- Tissemsilt (75 197)
- Tolga (55 809)

== See also ==
- Provinces of Algeria
- List of municipalities of Algeria
- List of metropolitan areas in Africa
- List of largest cities in the Arab world
