= Meskiana District =

Coordinates: 35.6277°N 7.6669°E

Meskiana District miss el kahina . massa kihana
- District
- Interactive map of Meskiana District
- Country: Algeria
- Province: Oum El Bouaghi Province
- Elevation: 2,790 ft (850 m)

Population (2008)85189
  - Total: 85,189
  - Density: 1,199.0/sq mi (462.92/km^{2})
- 85189
- Time zone: UTC+1 (CET)
- Postal code: 04004

Meskiana District is a district of Oum El Bouaghi Province, Algeria.

The district is further divided into 4 municipalities:

- Meskiana
- Behir Chergui
- El Belala
- Rahia
