= Souk Naâmane District =

Coordinates: 35.8957°N 6.3896°E

- District
- Interactive map of Souk Naâmane District
- Country: Algeria
- Province: Oum El Bouaghi Province
- Time zone: UTC+1 (CET)

Souk Naâmane is a municipality ( baladiyah ) in the province or district of Oum el-Bouaghi in Algeria. As of April 2008, it had a population of 23,988 .

The district is further divided into 3 municipalities:

- Souk Naamane
- Bir Chouhada
- Ouled Zouaï
