= Chott Tinsilt =

Lake in Oum El Bouaghi Province, Algeria

- Location: Oum El Bouaghi Province, Algeria
- Coordinates: 35°52′0″N 6°28′0″E
- Type: Lake
- Surface area: 103 km^{2} (40 sq mi)
- Surface elevation: 792 m^{2} (8,530 sq ft)

Location
- Interactive map of Chott Tinsilt

Chott Tinsilt is a saline lake situated within the High Plateau Wetlands, located in the Oum El Bouaghi Province. The site was designated as a Ramsar site on December 12, 2004. Its administration is overseen by the Forestry Governorate of Ouled Zouai, the Directorate of Water Resources, and the Regional Environment Inspectorate.

== Geography ==
=== Topography and hydrography ===
Chott Tinsilt is situated in the northern sector of the Ouled Zouai Plain, bordered by hills. The majority of Chott Tinsilt is sustained by precipitation from the Wadi Ben Zerhaib. Additionally, sewage from the Souk Naamane is discharged into the north-west side in small quantities. The water outlet is situated on the south-western side of the site and traverses the area until it reaches the Sabkhet Al-Zamoul. Chott Tinsilt has a catchment area of 10,300 ha, with a maximum depth of approximately half a metre.

=== Location ===
Chott Tinsilt is a shared resource between the municipalities of Souk Naamane and Ouled Zouai in the Oum El Bouaghi region. The site is situated at a distance of 5 km from Souk Naamane and 17 km to the south of Ain M'lila. To the east, Chott Tinsilt is bordered by National Road No.3, which connects Constantine to Batna and the railway line between Constantine, Biskra, and Sabkhet Al-Zamoul.

=== Climate ===
The region's climate is semi-arid, with precipitation of 196-370 mm per annum. The rainfall is characterized by its heavy and erratic nature. The region experiences cold winters typical of a cold continental climate, with a minimum temperature of 2.9 degrees Celsius. During the summer, the Sirocco winds contribute to a drying and warming trend, with a maximum temperature of 36.9 degrees Celsius.

== Wildlife ==
Eleven species of birds have been observed to migrate to Chott Tinsilt during the winter months. These include the mallard, Eurasian teal, Eurasian wigeon, northern pintail, northern shoveler, greylag goose, common shelduck, white-headed duck, Eurasian coot, greater flamingo, and common crane. In 2005, the total number of birds observed at the site was approximately 9025. The site has been designated an Important Bird Area (IBA) by BirdLife International.

The mammalian fauna include the red fox, golden jackal, Cape hare and black rat. The amphibian fauna comprises the Berber toad. The reptile fauna includes Acanthodactylus sp. and the European pond turtle. The invertebrate and crustacean fauna includes gastropods.
