= Dhalaâ District =

Coordinates: 35.5448°N 7.5157°E

- District
- Interactive map of Dhalaâ District
- Country: Algeria
- Province: Oum El Bouaghi Province
- Time zone: UTC+1 (CET)

Dhalaâ District is a district of Oum El Bouaghi Province, Algeria.

The district is further divided into 2 municipalities:

- Dhalaa
- El Djazia
