= Ouled Hamla =

- Commune and town
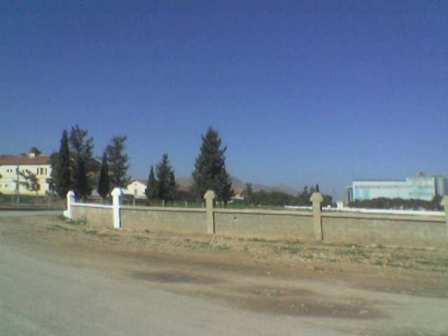

- Location within Algeria
- Country: Algeria
- Province: Oum El Bouaghi Province

Population (1998)
  - Total: 5,993
- Time zone: UTC+1 (CET)

Ouled Hamla (Arabic: أولاد حملة) is a town located in Aïn M'Lila District, Oum El Bouaghi Province, Algeria.

Bordered on the north-west by the municipality of Teleghma (Mila Province), the commune Souk Naamane to the south-west, the municipality of El Khroub (Constantine Province) to the north-east, and by Aïn M'lila to the south-east. The commune of Ouled Hamla covers an area of 152 km^{2}. The population is estimated at 11,546 inhabitants, or a density of 75.96 inhabitants per km^{2}.

The main crops have been maintained over the centuries, including cereals such as wheat and barley. Other important agricultural products include potatoes, tomatoes, peppers, carrots, and other vegetables.

== Etymology ==
From about 1830 to 1962, the name of Ouled Hamla was Berteaux, after the name of a French colonel who lived there during the French colonization.

The word ouled means 'sons of' in Maghrebi Arabic.
