= Aïn M'Lila District =

Coordinates: 36.0333°N 6.5833°E

- District
- Interactive map of Aïn M'Lila District
- Country: Algeria
- Province: Oum El Bouaghi Province
- Time zone: UTC+1 (CET)

Aïn M'Lila District is a district of Oum El Bouaghi Province, Algeria.

The district is further divided into 3 municipalities:

- Aïn M'lila
- Ouled Hamla
- Ouled Gacem
