= Aïn Beïda District =

Coordinates: 35.7964°N 7.3928°E

- District
- Interactive map of Aïn Beïda District
- Country: Algeria
- Province: Oum El Bouaghi Province
- Time zone: UTC+1 (CET)

Aïn Beïda District is a district of Oum El Bouaghi Province, Algeria.

The district is further divided into 3 municipalities:

- Aïn Beïda
- Zorg
- Berriche
