= Karim Soltani =

Algerian former footballer (born 1984)

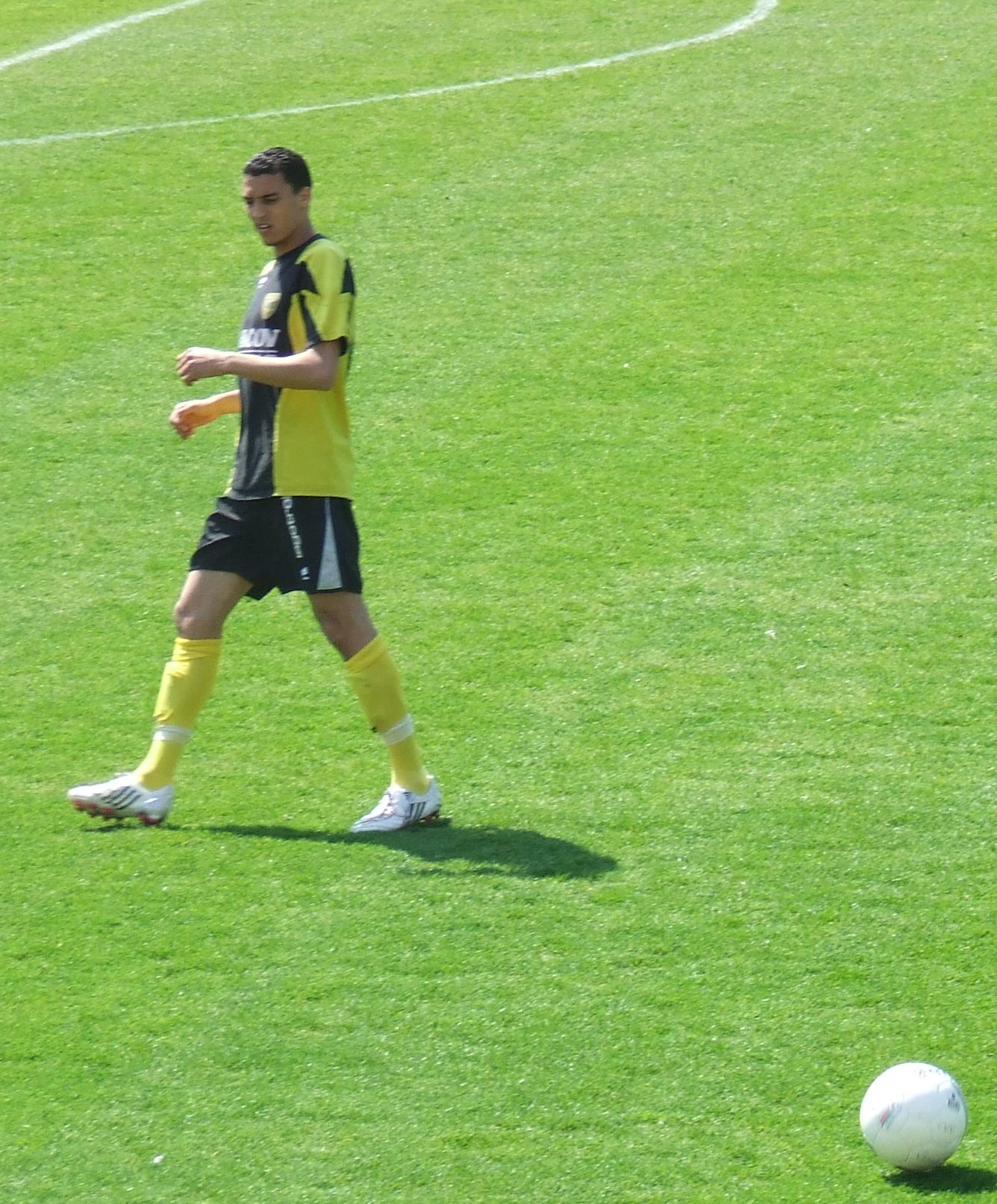
- VVV-Venlo 2008

Personal information
- Full name: Karim Soltani
- Date of birth: 29 August 1984 (age 42)
- Place of birth: Brest, Brittany, France
- Height: 1.79 m (5 ft 10 in)
- Positions: Winger; striker

Youth career
- 2000–2002: Stade Brest
- 2002–2004: Le Havre

Senior career*
Years	Team	Apps	(Gls)
2004–2005	Le Havre	0	(0)
2005–2008	VVV-Venlo	77	(13)
2008–2010	ADO Den Haag	59	(11)
2010–2011	Iraklis	23	(4)
2011–2012	Aris	15	(0)
2012–2013	ES Sétif	7	(1)
2013–2017	Skoda Xanthi	114	(21)
2017–2018	PAS Giannina	15	(1)
- * Club domestic league appearances and goals as of 16:38, 20 March 2019 (UTC)

Karim Soltani (Arabic: كريم سلطاني; born 29 August 1984) is an Algerian former footballer. He primarily played as a winger, but could also play as a striker.

== Career ==
Born in Brest, France, Soltani began his career at age 11 in a small club in the city. In 2000, at age 15, he joined the junior ranks of local club Stade Brest. He only remained with the club for two years before being spotted by scouts for Le Havre AC.

=== Le Havre ===
In 2002, at age 17, Soltani signed a two-year amateur contract with Le Havre's junior team. At the end of his contract, he was given a one-year extension to play with the first team but he failed to make any appearances for the club.

=== VVV-Venlo ===
In the summer of 2005, Soltani signed with VVV-Venlo, who were then playing in the Eerste Divisie, the second highest division in the Netherlands. In his first season, he made 19 appearances, scoring 3 goals for the club. He would build on those numbers in his second season, making 30 appearances and scoring 7 goals, and leading the club to promotion to the Eredivisie. In the 2007–08 season, Soltani scored 3 goals in 28 appearances for the club. On 30 March 2008, it was reported that Soltani was going to leave VVV-Venlo at the end of his contract and return to France to be closer to his family. However, he decided to remain in the Netherlands and instead joined ADO Den Haag at the start of the 2008–09 season.

=== ADO Den Haag ===
Although it was expected Soltani to return to France, he chose to sign for Eredivisie outfit ADO Den Haag. He debuted for the club in an away 2–5 triumph against Sparta Rotterdam in Het Kasteel in the opening day of the 2008–09 season. He netted his first goal in another away triumph of ADO Den Haag against NAC Breda that ended 0–4. At the end of the season he totalled 6 goals in 27 league matches played. He also featured in 3 KNVB Cup games scoring 1 goal. In his second season for ADO Den Haag Soltani totalled 4 goals in 28 league games, plus 1 match in the KNVB Cup.

=== Iraklis ===
On 23 July 2010 he signed a one-year contract with Super League Greece side Iraklis. He had contract offers from Brest, Nantes and Lens but he decided to sign for Iraklis as the club's offer was considered by Soltani to be the best both financially and athletically. Soltani debuted for Iraklis in the opening day of the 2010–11 season. It was a match against Greek club Olympiacos. Soltani entered the match as a substitute in the 62nd minute of the match. At that time Olympiacos had the lead by 0–1. Soltani was an integral part of Iraklis' effort to win the game. In the 80th minute he won a penalty, that Bogdan Mara converted into a goal and in the 87th minute he handed an assist to his teammate Vellios to seal Iraklis' 2–1 victory. In the second match of the season against Atromitos in Peristeri Stadium he, again, came in as a substitute in the 67th minute. The match ended 1–1 with Soltani scoring his first goal for the club in the 89th minute helping Iraklis to an away draw. Also he netted his second goal and gave Iraklis Thessaloniki the lead at sixth match day at home draw 1–1 against Panserraikos.

=== Aris ===
In summer of 2011, Soltani joined Aris, getting number 7. He made excellent appearances during friendly games, also scoring against Peniarol. He scored his first official goal against Panthrakikos FC, for the Greek Cup on 22 December 2011.

=== ES Sétif ===
After a year Aris, Soltani returned to his country playing in Algerian Ligue Professionnelle 1 for ES Sétif. He was acquired on a free transfer with a monthly salary of €15 000, receiving the highest salary in the club.

After his pre-season training in Sousse under ES Sétif coach Hubert Velud, his recruitment was finalized with the Algerian champions. Soltani signed a two-year contract. However, after six months, he terminated his contract, as the club has not acceded to his request to receive an eight months' salary in advance. He played seven games with the club scoring one goal before he returned to Europe, playing for Skoda Xanthi.

=== Skoda Xanthi ===
In January 2013, Skoda Xanthi announced the acquisition of Karim Soltani, a player with experience in the Super League Greece on a free transfer. Soltani make his debut with the club on 27 January 2013, in a 1–0 away win against PAOK. On 26 September 2015, on an away 1–1 draw in the league against Iraklis had a quarrel after a violent foul, initially with Costin Lazăr caused him the expel from the game with a second yellow card and afterwards with his team manager Georgios Kaznaferis.

On 31 May 2017, Xanthi announced that the contract of Soltani, which was to expire on 30 June, would not be extended.

=== PAS Giannina ===
In August 2017, PAS Giannina, also of the Super League Greece, announced the acquisition of Soltani on a free transfer.

== International career ==
Born in France, Soltani is also eligible to represent Algeria in international competition and has expressed his interest to play for Algeria. According to El Watan, Algerian head coach Rabah Saâdane was keeping an eye on Soltani for the 2010 African Cup of Nations.

== Personal life ==
Soltani is originally from the Algerian town of Berriche, Oum El Bouaghi Province.
