= Aïn Fakroun District =

Coordinates: 35.9667°N 6.8667°E

- District
- Interactive map of Aïn Fakroun District
- Country: Algeria
- Province: Oum El Bouaghi Province
- Time zone: UTC+1 (CET)

Aïn Fakroun District is a district of Oum El Bouaghi Province, Algeria.

The district is further divided into 2 municipalities:

- Aïn Fakroun
- El Fedjoudj Boughrara Saoudi
