= Zorg =

Zorg may refer to:

- Zorg, Algeria
- A character in the film Betty Blue, 37°2 le matin
- Jean-Baptiste Emanuel Zorg, a character in the film The Fifth Element
- An opensource implementation of secure telephony protocol ZRTP
- An alien race in the games Strange Adventures in Infinite Space and Weird Worlds: Return to Infinite Space
- An alien race from the planet X-13 imagined by Calvin from Calvin and Hobbes when he imagines himself as Spaceman Spiff. Refer to Calvin's alter egos (Calvin and Hobbes)
- A fictional mathematical construct from Don DeLillo's Ratner's Star
- The 18th century massacre aboard the slave ship Zong

== See also ==
- Zork
- Zurg (disambiguation)
- Zerg
