= F'Kirina District =

Coordinates: 35.6638°N 7.2987°E

- District
- Interactive map of F'Kirina District
- Country: Algeria
- Province: Oum El Bouaghi Province
- Time zone: UTC+1 (CET)

F'Kirina District is a district of Oum El Bouaghi Province, Algeria.

The district is further divided into 2 municipalities:

- Fkirina
- Oued Nini
