= Pescennia gens =

Ancient Roman family

The gens Pescennia was a plebeian family at ancient Rome. Members of this gens are first mentioned in the time of Cicero, but it was not until imperial times that they came to prominence. The Pescennii were of equestrian rank. The most illustrious of the family was Gaius Pescennius Niger, an able general, who was proclaimed emperor in AD 193, only to be defeated and put to death by Septimius Severus the following year.

== Origin ==
The nomen Pescennius is one of several similar gentilicia formed with the suffix -ennius, which was more typical of Oscan names than of Latin. It is derived from an Oscan praenomen, Pescennus or Perscennus, cognate with the Latin adjective praecandus, referring to someone whose hair was greying or prematurely grey.

== Praenomina ==
The Pescennii used a variety of praenomina, of which the most important were Lucius, Quintus, and Marcus, Gaius, and Publius, all of which were very common throughout Roman history. Some of the Pescennii bore other names, including Sextus, Titus, or Gnaeus, which were also common praenomina. A less common name borne by one of the family was Statius, an Oscan praenomen that was little used at Rome, but more frequent in rural Italy.

== Members ==
This list includes abbreviated praenomina. For an explanation of this practice, see filiation.

- Gnaeus Pescennius L. l., a freedman, named in an inscription from Capua, dating to 105 BC.
- Titus Pescennius T. f., named in an inscription from Capua, dating to 105 BC.
- Pescennius, a friend of Cicero during his exile at Thessalonica.
- Marcus Pescennius M. l. Eros, a freedman named in an inscription from Luna in Etruria, dating to the later first century BC or the early first century AD.
- Statius Pescennius L. f., a prefect at Antiochia Pisidiae in Galatia, between AD 21 and 23.
- Pescennius Flavianus, together with Pescennius Natalis, an aedile charged with distributing the grain supply at Rome in AD 113.
- Pescennius Natalis, together with Pescennius Flavianus, an aedile charged with distributing the grain supply at Rome in AD 113.
- Pescennius, a military engineer named in an inscription from Troesmis in Moesia Inferior, dating to AD 134.
- Gaius Pescennius Niger, an able general who rose to prominence under Marcus Aurelius, held the consulship under Commodus, and was appointed governor of Syria in 191. Proclaimed emperor in 193, he had the support of the senate and many of the people, but he was slow to act, and after several defeats by the forces of Septimius Severus, he was captured and put to death, along with his family.
- Publius Pescennius Niger, probably the brother of the emperor, was one of the Arval Brethren in AD 183, during the reign of Commodus.
- Pescennius Princus, said to have been the young son of the emperor Clodius Albinus, referred to in a letter that Septimius Severus sent to Albinus, along with a party of assassins. After Albinus' death, his sons were at first pardoned, then put to death, along with their mother, and their bodies thrown into the Rhodanus.
- Pescennius Albinus, one of six high-ranking Pescennii whom the emperor Septimius Severus had put to death, without a trial, along with a number of other notable men, after the defeat of Albinus in AD 197.
- Pescennius Aurelianus, one of the six Pescennii whom Septimius Severus had put to death without a trial in AD 197.
- Pescennius Festus, one of the six Pescennii whom Septimius Severus had put to death without a trial in AD 197. He is probably the same as the historian Pescennius Festus, whose miscellany Lactantius cites with reference to the practice of human sacrifice at Carthage.
- Pescennius Julianus, one of the six Pescennii whom Septimius Severus had put to death without a trial in AD 197.
- Pescennius Materianus, one of the six Pescennii whom Septimius Severus had put to death without a trial in AD 197.
- Pescennius Veratianus, one of the six Pescennii whom Septimius Severus had put to death without a trial in AD 197.
- Pescennius Primus, enumerated together with Pescennius Thevestinus in a list of donors at Lambaesis in Numidia, dating to AD 200.
- Pescennius Thevestinus, enumerated together with Pescennius Primus in a list of donors at Lambaesis, dating to AD 200.
- Pescennius Vitulus, one of the Salii Palatini, died in AD 200.
- Pescennius Felix, one of the vigiles at Rome, circa AD 205.
- Gaius Pescennius Faustus, enumerated among the vigiles in AD 208.
- Gaius Pescennius Primus, enumerated among the vigiles in AD 208.
- Pescennia Marcellina, a wealthy woman, adopted and supported the young Marcus Clodius Pupienus Maximus, enabling him to pursue a political career, ending with his brief elevation to the empire in AD 238.
- Lucius Pescennius Honoratus, named in a dedicatory inscription from Miliana in Mauretania Caesariensis, dating to AD 261.
- Marcus Pescennius Q. f., one of the duumviri at Luna during the reign of Maxentius.

=== Undated Pescennii ===
- Pescennia, buried at Ostia, with a monument from her son, Pescennius.
- Pescennia, the wife of Pescennius Marcellus, buried at the present site of Bir-Mecherga, formerly in Africa Proconsularis, aged thirty, having borne three sons, Pescennius Sunnius, Pescennius Marcus, and Pescennius Marcellus; and two daughters, Pescennia Victorina and Pescennia Fortunata, all of whom died in childhood.
- Pescennia A. f., buried at Venusia in Apulia.
- Pescennia L. f., daughter of Lucius Pescennius Januarius, and freedwoman of Ampaelidus, buried at Rome with Lucius Pescennius Valens.
- Pescennia M. f., daughter of Marcus Pescennius Faustus, named in an inscription from Civitas Sivalitana in Africa Proconsularis.
- Pescennius, dedicated a monument at Ostia to his mother, Pescennia.
- Pescennius Q. f., one of the quattuorviri at Aesernia in Samnium.
- Gaius Pescennius M. f., named in an inscription from Forum Clodii in Etruria.
- Lucius Pescennius, named in an inscription from Trebula Suffenas in Sabinum.
- Lucius Pescennius L. f., named in an inscription from Trebula Suffenas.
- Marcus Pescennius, named in an inscription from Atria in Venetia and Histria.
- Marcus Pescennius M. f. Messia natus, buried at Clusium in Etruria, aged twenty-one.
- Pamphilus Pescennius Q. s., a slave mentioned in a libationary inscription from Amphipolis in Macedonia.
- Publius Pescennius L. f., a veteran of the third legion, buried at Matera in Africa Proconsularis, aged eighty-five.
- Quintus Pescennius, donated three columns to the shrine of Feronia at Trebula Mutuesca in Latium.
- Quintus Pescennius, named in an inscription from Forum Julii in Gallia Narbonensis
- Quintus Pescennius Q. f., named in an inscription from Narbo in Gallia Narbonensis.
- Quintus Pescennius Q. f., an aedile, named in an inscription from Venafrum in Latium.
- Pescennius P. C. l. Aesiaius, a freedman named in an inscription from Rome.
- Marcus Pescennius Apolaustus, named in inscriptions from Clusium.
- Pescennia Artemisia, a freedwoman buried at Rome.
- Pescennia L. l. Aucta, a freedwoman, and the wife of Sextus Pontius Ruga, buried at Rome, with a monument from several of her clientes.
- Quintus Pescennius Q. f. Avitus, husband of Proculeia Honorata, buried at Thubursicum in Africa Proconsularis, aged sixty-two.
- Quintus Pescennius Avitus Pollicitus, father of Quintus Pescennius Saturninus, buried at Thubursicum.
- Quintus Pescennius Q. f. Callistenus, named in an inscription from Narbo.
- Lucius Pescennius Castus, named in an inscription from Madauros in Africa Proconsularis.
- Marcus Pescennius Catullinus, buried at Sigus in Numidia, aged sixty-five.
- Lucius Pescennius M. f. Cilo, buried at Cumae.
- Lucius Pescennius M. f. Cilo, buried at Puteoli in Campania.
- Pescennius Clemens, named in an inscription from the present site of Sassari in Sardinia.
- Gaius Pescennius C. f. Clemens, one of the seviri Augustales at Forum Sempronii in Umbria.
- Quintus Pescennius Q. f. Contentus, buried at the present site of Djenan ben Lakmar, formerly in Numidia, aged one hundred and five.
- Pescennius Crescens, buried at Ostia.
- Pescennius Crestus, named in an inscription from Limonum in Aquitania.
- Lucius Pescennius Elpidephorus, dedicated a monument at Ravenna to his wife, Collegia Felicitas, together with his daughter, Flavia Epicharis.
- Lucius Pescennius Eros, named in an inscription from Rome.
- Publius Pescennius Expectatus, buried at Capua, with a monument dedicated by his wife.
- Pescennia M. f. Fausta, named in a funerary inscription from Rome.
- Pescennia Faustina, buried at Cirta in Numidia, aged twenty-seven.
- Marcus Pescennius Faustus, named in an inscription from Civitas Sivalitana.
- Pescennia L. l. Felicia, a freedwoman, buried at Beneventum in Calabria.
- Pescennius Felix, named in an inscription from Civitas Sivalitana.
- Lucius Pescennius Felix, named in a funerary inscription from Beneventum.
- Sextus Pescennius Sex. Sex. l. Felix, a freedman, named in an inscription from Rome.
- Pescennia Fortunata, the daughter of Pescennius Marcellus and Pescennia, buried at the present site of Bir Mecherga, aged thirteen years, eight months.
- Pescennia Fortunata, buried at Cirta, aged forty-five.
- Quintus Pescennius Fuscus Bucco, son of Egnatia Donata, was buried at Hadrumetum in Africa Proconsularis, aged seventeen.
- Gnaeus Pescennius Gnostus, named in a libationary inscription from Parma.
- Titus Pescennius Gracilis, named in an inscription from Forum Julii.
- Pescennia A. l. Helena, a freedwoman named in an inscription from Rome.
- Marcus Pescennius M. l. Hera, a freedman named in an inscription from Rome.
- Lucius Pescennius Honoratus, buried at Madauros, aged eighteen.
- Pescennius Januarius, named in an inscription from Lambaesis in Numidia.
- Lucius Pescennius Januarius, the father of Pescennia, to whom he dedicated a monument at Rome.
- Pescennia C. f. Justina, buried at Rome, aged sixteen years, four months, and eight days.
- Lucius Pescennius Justus, primus pilus in one of the legions, buried at Rome.
- Gaius Pescennius Lathimus, dedicated a monument to his son, Pescennius Restitutus, the slave of Pescennius Maximus, at Aveia in Samnium.
- Publius Pescennius Leo, buried at Vicetia in Venetia and Histria.
- Titus Pescennius Liberalis, husband of Aemilia Saturnina, to whom he dedicated a monument at Rome.
- Marcus Pescennius M. l. Lucrio, named in a funerary inscription from Rome.
- Pescennius Marcellus, the husband of Pescennia, and father of Pescennius Sunnius, Pescennius Marcus, Pescennius Marcellus, Pescennia Victorina, and Pescennia Fortunata, all buried at the present site of Bir Mecherga.
- Pescennius Marcellus, the son of Pescennius Marcellus and Pescennia, buried at the present site of Bir Mecherga, aged one.
- Pescennius Marcus, the son of Pescennius Marcellus and Pescennia, buried at the present site of Bir Mecherga, aged two.
- Pescennius Maximus, an eques serving in the tenth cohort of the praetorian guard, and the master of Pescennius Restitutus, who was Aveia in Samnium.
- Marcus Pescennius M. f. Maximus, named in an inscription from Bononia in Cisalpine Gaul.
- Pescennia Melitine, a client of Sextus Pontius Ruga and Pescennia Aucta, to whom she helped dedicate monuments at Rome.
- Pescennia Mesia, buried at Catellum Elefantum in Numidia, aged forty-five.
- Publius Pescennius Ↄ. l. Optatus, a freedman who rose to be one of the sexviri (Note: Or seviri, usually a college of six priests, of whom the most famous were the Sodales Augustales at Rome, although those were typically chosen from among the leading citizens, and would not normally have included freedmen. In this case the college is not specifically identified.) at Vicetia.
- Pescennia Phyllis, named in an inscription from Trebula Suffenas.
- Sextus Pescennius Pirata, a client of Sextus Pontius Ruga and Pescennia Aucta, to whom he helped dedicate monuments at Rome.
- Pescennia C. l. Prima, buried at Capua.
- Pescennia L. l. Primigenia, a freedwoman buried at Venafrum.
- Sextus Pescennius Sex. Sex. Sex. l. Primus, a freedman, named in an inscription from Rome.
- Pescennia P. f. Propola, named in an inscription from Rome.
- Quintus Pescennius Publicius, buried at Sigus in Numidia, aged forty.
- Pescennius C. f. Restitutus, slave of Pescennius Maximus, buried at Aveia, aged eight years, five months.
- Sextus Pescennius Rhodo, a client of Sextus Pontius Ruga and Pescennia Aucta, to whom he helped dedicate monuments at Rome.
- Pescennius Rogatianus, named in an inscription from Civitas Sivalitana.
- Pescennia Saturnina, buried at Sitifis in Mauretania Caesariensis, aged one hundred and twenty-five.
- Lucius Pescennius L. f. Saturninus, husband of Maria Quinta, and a veteran of the eleventh legion, buried at Raetinium in Dalmatia.
- Quintus Pescennius Q. f. Saturninus, dedicated a monument at Thubursicum to his father, Quintus Pescennius Avitus Pollicitus.
- Gaius Pescennius Saturi f. Saturus Cornelianus, flamen of Hadrian, a judicial magistrate, and one of the duumvirs at Civitas Sivalitana, donated four thousand sestertii for the erection of two statues.
- Marcus Pescennius Saturnus, mentioned in a list of donors to the local priests at Limisa in Africa Proconsularis.
- Pescennia Secunda, buried at Madauros, aged thirty.
- Publius Pescennius P. f. Secundus, one of the quattuorviri at Capua.
- Pescennius Securus, erected a monument for Fundania Secura at Aesernia.
- Lucius Pescennius Sedatus, dedicated a monument at Castellum Tidditanorum in Numidia to his friend, Quintus Voltius Maximus.
- Pescennia C. f. Silvina, named in an inscription from Forum Julii.
- Lucius Pescennius Stephanus, named in an inscription from Rome.
- Pescennius Sunnius, the son of Pescennius Marcellus and Pescennia, buried at the present site of Bir Mecherga, aged three.
- Lucius Pescennius L. f. Tertius, buried at Venafrum.
- Pescennia Thallusa, named in an inscription from Trebula Suffenas.
- Pescennius Ↄ. l. Thamurus, named in an inscription from Rome.
- Pescennia L. f. Tyche, named in an inscription from Trebula Suffenas.
- Quintus Pescennius Urbanus, buried at Sigus, aged thirty-nine.
- Lucius Pescennius Valens, buried at Rome with Pescennia, a freedwoman.
- Gaius Pescennius Victor, buried at Caldis in Numidia.
- Pescennius T. l. Victor, a freedman buried at Thibilis in Numidia, aged forty.
- Quintus Pescennius Victor, a native of Thamguadi in Africa Proconsularis, named in a list of soldiers at Lambaesis.
- Lucius Pescennius C. f. Victor Severianus, buried at Limisa in Africa Proconsularis, aged thirty-two years, eleven months.
- Pescennia Victorina, the daughter of Pescennius Marcellus and Pescennia, buried at the present site of Bir Mecherga, aged seven.

== See also ==
- List of Roman gentes

== Bibliography ==
- Marcus Tullius Cicero, Epistulae ad Familiares.
- Lucius Cassius Dio Cocceianus (Cassius Dio), Roman History.
- Herodianus, History of the Empire from the Death of Marcus.
- Lucius Caecilius Firmianus Lactantius, Institutiones Divinae (The Divine Institutes).
- Aelius Lampridius, Aelius Spartianus, Flavius Vopiscus, Julius Capitolinus, Trebellius Pollio, and Vulcatius Gallicanus, Historia Augusta (Augustan History).
- Sextus Aurelius Victor, De Caesaribus (On the Caesars), Epitome de Caesaribus (attributed).
- Dictionary of Greek and Roman Biography and Mythology, William Smith, ed., Little, Brown and Company, Boston (1849).
- Theodor Mommsen et alii, Corpus Inscriptionum Latinarum (The Body of Latin Inscriptions, abbreviated CIL), Berlin-Brandenburgische Akademie der Wissenschaften (1853–present).
- Notizie degli Scavi di Antichità (News of Excavations from Antiquity, abbreviated NSA), Accademia dei Lincei (1876–present).
- Bulletin Archéologique du Comité des Travaux Historiques et Scientifiques (Archaeological Bulletin of the Committee on Historic and Scientific Works, abbreviated BCTH), Imprimerie Nationale, Paris (1885–1973).
- René Cagnat et alii, L'Année épigraphique (The Year in Epigraphy, abbreviated AE), Presses Universitaires de France (1888–present).
- Paul von Rohden, Elimar Klebs, & Hermann Dessau, Prosopographia Imperii Romani (The Prosopography of the Roman Empire, abbreviated PIR), Berlin (1898).
- Atti della Accademia Nazionale dei Lincei (Acts of the National Academy of the Lincei, abbreviated AttiAcLinc), Rome (1901–1916).
- Stéphane Gsell, Inscriptions Latines de L'Algérie (Latin Inscriptions from Algeria, abbreviated ILAlg), Edouard Champion, Paris (1922–present).
- Emile Espérandieu, Inscriptions Latines de Gaule (Narbonnaise) (Latin Inscriptions from Gallia Narbonensis, abbreviated ILGN), Ernest Leroux, Paris (1929).
