= Sigus District =

Coordinates: 36.1167°N 6.7833°E

- District
- Interactive map of Sigus District
- Country: Algeria
- Province: Oum El Bouaghi Province
- Time zone: UTC+1 (CET)

Sigus District is a district of Oum El Bouaghi Province, Algeria.

The district is further divided into 2 municipalities:

- Sigus
- El Amiria
