= Oum El Bouaghi District =

Coordinates: 35.8775°N 7.1136°E

Oum El Bouaghi District دائرة أم البواقي
- District
- Interactive map of Oum El Bouaghi District
- Country: Algeria
- Province: Oum El Bouaghi Province
- Time zone: UTC+1 (CET)

Oum El Bouaghi District (Arabic: دائرة أم البواقي) is a district of Oum El Bouaghi Province, Algeria.

The district is further divided into 2 municipalities:

- Oum El Bouaghi
- Aïn Zitoun
