= Aïn Kechra District (Oum El Bouaghi Province) =

Coordinates: 35°55′16″N 6°41′58″E

- District
- Country: Algeria
- Province: Oum El Bouaghi Province
- Time zone: UTC+1 (CET)

Aïn Kechra District is a district of Oum El Bouaghi Province, Algeria.

The district is further divided into 3 municipalities:

- Aïn Kercha
- El Harmilia
- Hanchir Toumghani
