= Ain M'lila Airfield =

World War II military airfield in Algeria

Ain M'lila Airfield
- Part of Twelfth Air Force
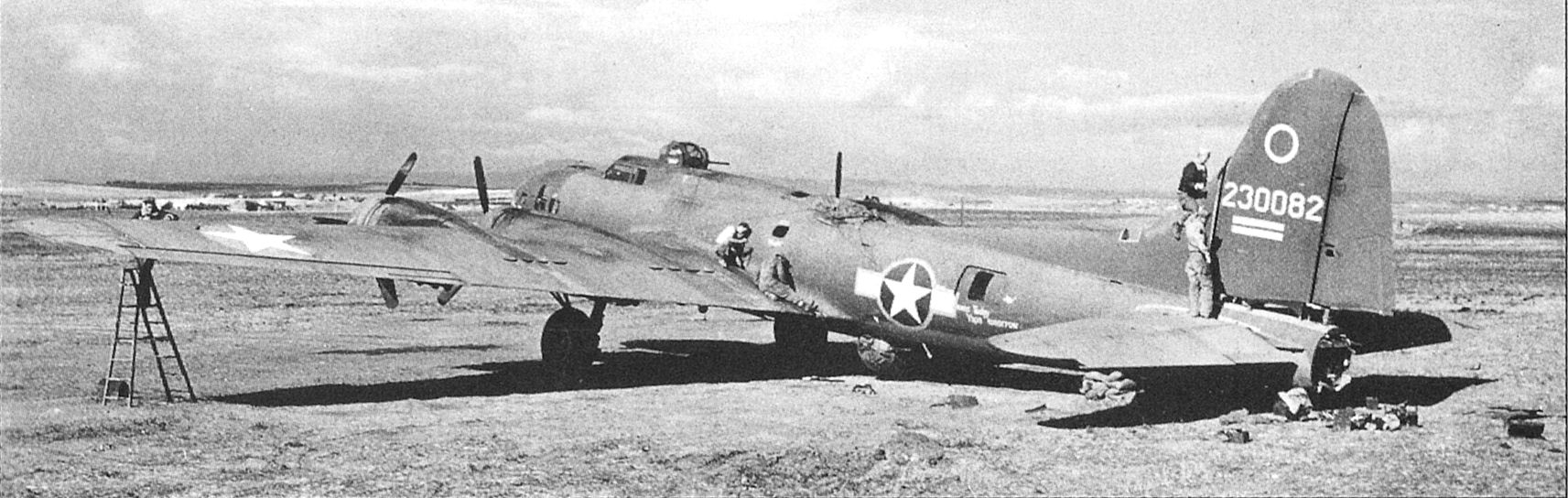
- 20th Bombardment Squadron Boeing B-17F-85-BO Fortress 42-30082 being serviced at Ain M'lila Airfield, Algeria

Site information
- Type: Military Airfield
- Controlled by: United States Army Air Forces

Location
- Location of Ain M'lila Airfield, Algeria
- Coordinates: 36°00′19″N 006°34′22″E

Site history
- Built: 1942
- In use: 1942-1943

Ain M'lila Airfield is an abandoned World War II military airfield in Algeria, located approximately 17 km north-northwest of Aïn Kercha in Oum el Bouaghi province, about 50 km south-southeast of Constantine. It was built by the Army Corps of Engineers on a flat, dry lakebed at an altitude of 2580 feet, designed for heavy bomber use by the United States Army Air Force Twelfth Air Force during the North African Campaign with concrete runways, hardstands and taxiways. Billeting and support facilities consisted of tents. Due to its high altitude, the days were hot and the nights cold. Known units which operated from Ain M'lila were:

- 2d Bombardment Group, 17 June-31 July 1943, B-17 Flying Fortress
- 301st Bombardment Group, 17 January - 6 March 1943, B-17 Flying Fortress
- 321st Bombardment Group, 12 March-1 June 1943, B-25 Mitchell

The Americans pulled out in the summer of 1943, heading to their new bases around Foggia, Italy and Ain M'lila was abandoned. The engineers dismantled what they could and the airfield was reclaimed by the desert. Today only faint traces can be seen on aerial photography.

== See also ==
- Boeing B-17 Flying Fortress airfields in the Mediterranean Theater of Operations
- Aïn M'lila
- Chott Tinsilt
