= Babouche =

Babouche is a surname. Notable people with the surname include:

- Réda Babouche (born 1979), Algerian footballer

== See also ==
- Aïn Babouche, a town and commune in Oum El Bouaghi Province, Algeria
