= Ksar Sbahi District =

Coordinates: 36.0833°N 7.2500°E

- District
- Interactive map of Ksar Sbahi District
- Country: Algeria
- Province: Oum El Bouaghi Province
- Time zone: UTC+1 (CET)

Ksar Sbahi District is a district of Oum El Bouaghi Province, Algeria.

The district is further divided into 1 municipalities:

- Ksar Sbahi
