= Meskiana =

Meskiana مسكيانة
- Commune and town
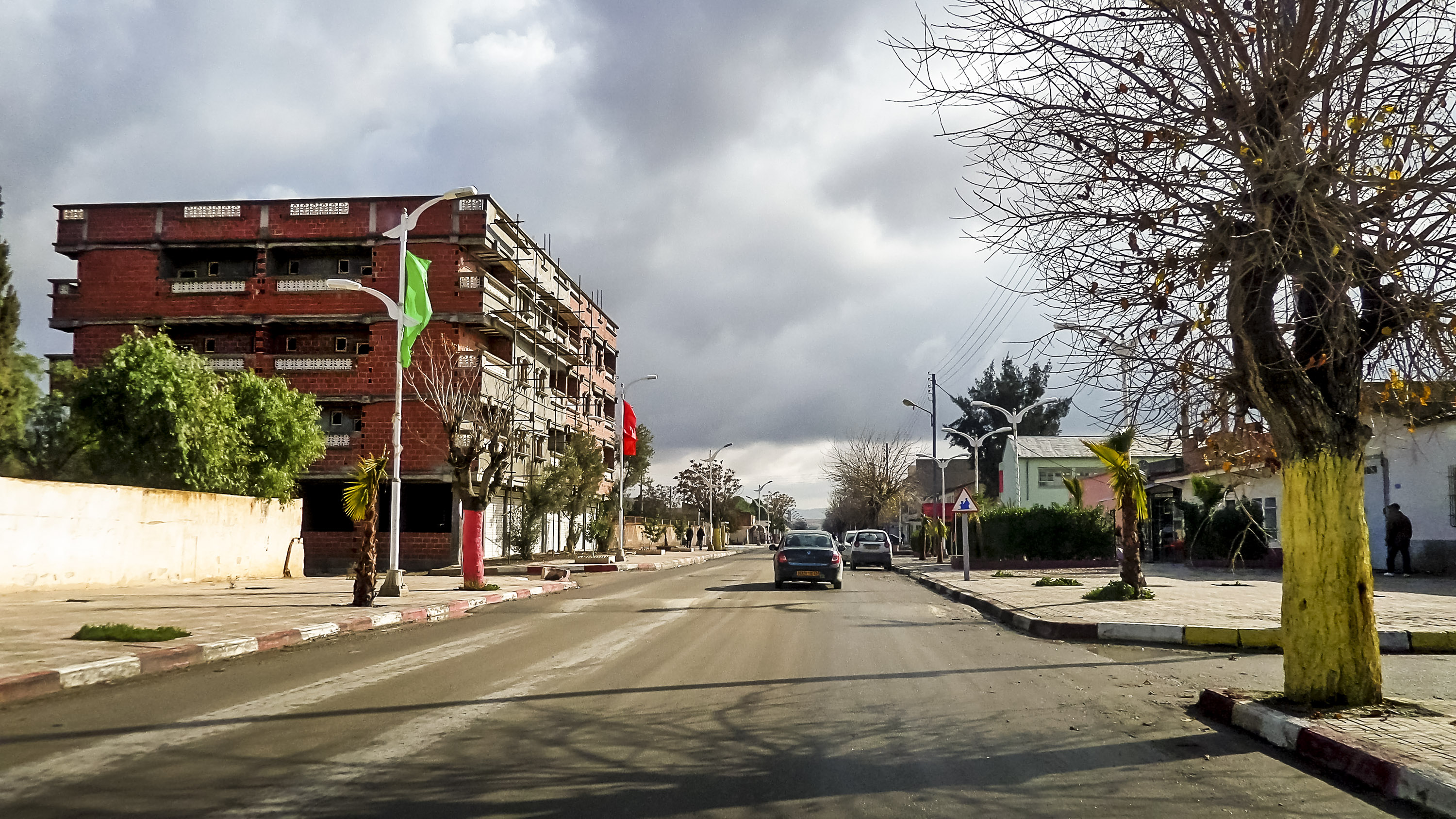

- Location within Algeria
- Coordinates: 35°37′40″N 7°40′1″E
- Country: Algeria
- Province: Oum El Bouaghi Province
- District: Meskiana District

Area
  - Total: 71 sq mi (184 km^{2})

Population (2020)
  - Total: 60,000
- Time zone: UTC+1 (CET)

Meskiana is a town and commune in Oum El Bouaghi Province, Algeria near the Tunisian border. According to the 1998 census it has a population of 25,849. It was the birthplace of novelist Yamina Méchakra.
