= Aïn Beïda, Oum El Bouaghi =

Aïn Beïda عين البيضاء
- Commune and city
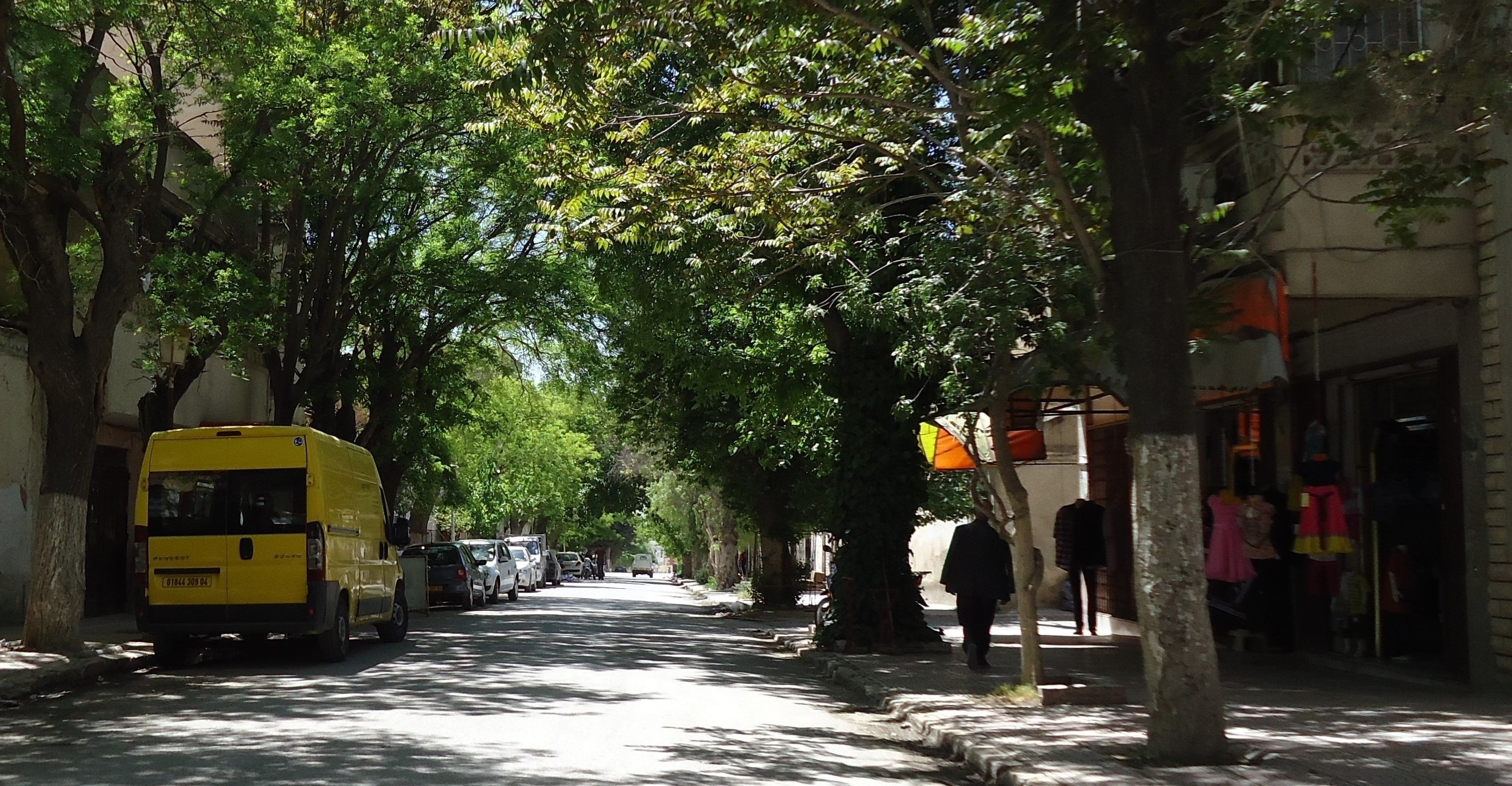
- Street view of Aïn Beïda

- Location of Aïn Beïda within Oum El Bouaghi province

- Location of Aïn Beïda within Algeria
- Coordinates: 35°47′N 7°23′E
- Country: Algeria
- Province: Oum El Bouaghi Province
- District: Aïn Beïda District

Area
  - Total: 53.73 km^{2} (20.75 sq mi)
- Elevation: 1,020 m (3,350 ft)

Population (2008 census)
  - Total: 116,064
  - Density: 2,160/km^{2} (5,595/sq mi)
- Time zone: UTC+1 (CET)
- Postal code: 04201

Aïn Beïda (Arabic: عين البيضاء) is a city and municipality (baladiyah) located in Oum El Bouaghi Province, Algeria, south east of Constantine and north of Khenchla, inhabited by Chaouis and Arabs. In 1998 its population was 88,300.

== Etymology ==
Aïn is Arabic and means spring, while Beïda means white. Thus, Aïn Beïda literally means "White spring". The "whiteness" refers to the purity of the water that springs from the said spring. It might refers also to the Eye of the white Mare which dies near the white spring and took that name.

== History ==
The town center still features a garden that houses Roman ruins including undergrounds tunnels, which indicates that the town has a long and rich history. Former name in Roman Era is "Marcimani". The city was a strategic town in Roman Era and was in frontiers with Baghai state. The Chaoui Haraktas tribe inhabited and reigned the area near Ain Beida (East of Oum bouaghi district) through history and defended it many times. When Algeria was a state in Ottoman Empire, Khalifat of Haractas was one of the strongest Emirates in East of Algeria. A war was taken place between Haractas and Constantine Bey which ends by an alliance between the two sides. The Khalifat had 25000 men as army by 1827. Harkati provide assistance before Algiers invasion before taken by French armies. They assist Bey of Constantine before the falling of Constantine in 1837. The Khalifat holds the French invasion many times through ten years between 1937 and 1948. In 1848 French army advance through sidi rghis and ain beida and Haractas army retreat to Meskiana. Then a big battle take place in Oued Meskiana, when a 30,000 harkatis supported by neighbor tribes defeated by 60,000 French army with 3 generals, so that ends with a peace treaty between the two sides. Many "Baidis" have been in World war 1 and 2 and also in first Arabic Israeili war of 1948 In Algerian war many have joined the battle and among them there was martyrs: like; Saidi Djemouii (Black tiger of palestro), Delphi Ibrahim, Colonel Hadj Ali Hamdi and many others. After independence, the city has grown to be a prominent area of trading goods, recently selling cars, production of electricity, distribution of gas. From the Olemas Muslimin we cite: Lakhdar boukeffa, Zinai Hadj belkacem; Zemouchi, and after them many olemas like Cheikh Ghoulam and Ghazali.

Historical population
Year	Population
1954	18,900
1966	30,800
1977	42,600 (town); 44,300 (municipality)
1987	62,000
1998	88,300
2015	250,000

== Localities of the commune ==
The commune of Aïn Beïda is composed of 8 localities:

- Aïn Beïda (ville)
- Aïn Beïda Seghira
- Smalil
- Bir Ounas
- Bir Dahmane
- Oum El Guemel
- Ensaf El Beida
- Koudiet Bouakouz
