= Aïn Babouche District =

Coordinates: 35.9412°N 7.1856°E

Aïn Babouche District دائرة عين بابوش
- District
- Map of Algeria highlighting Laghouat Province

- Map of Laghouat Province highlighting Oued Morra District
- Country: Algeria
- Province: Oum El Bouaghi Province
- District seat: Aïn Babouche

Area
  - Total: 124 sq mi (322 km^{2})

Population (2008)
  - Total: 18,896
  - Density: 152/sq mi (58.7/km^{2})
- Time zone: UTC+1 (CET)

Aïn Babouche District is a district of Oum El Bouaghi Province, Algeria.

== Municipalities ==
The district is further divided into 2 municipalities:

- Aïn Babouche
- Aïn Diss
