= Zurg =

Zurg may refer to:

- Emperor Zurg, a fictional robotic antagonist in Toy Story 2
- Zurg language, an extinct Berber language of Libya
