= Aïn Diss =

Coordinates: 36.033333°N 7.002778°E

Aïn Diss عين الديس
- Commune and town
- Location of Aïn Diss within Laghouat Province
- Country: Algeria
- Province: Oum El Bouaghi Province
- District: Aïn Babouche

Area
  - Total: 47 sq mi (123 km^{2})

Population (2008)
  - Total: 2,767
  - Density: 58.3/sq mi (22.5/km^{2})
- Time zone: UTC+1 (CET)

Aïn Diss is a town and commune in Oum El Bouaghi Province, Algeria. According to the 1998 census it has a population of 2741.

== Localities of the commune ==
The commune is composed of eight localities:

- Centre Bir Amar
- El Hassi
- Bir Bouamza
- Ain Charef
- El Ghedir
- Lemoullah
- El Gorzi
- Bekoula
