= Fkirina =

- Commune and town
- Location within Algeria
- Coordinates: 35°39′50″N 7°17′55″E
- Country: Algeria
- Province: Oum El Bouaghi Province

Population (1998)
  - Total: 11,413
- Time zone: UTC+1 (CET)

Fkirina is a town and commune in Oum El Bouaghi Province, Algeria. According to the 1998 census it has a population of 11,413.
