= Ouled Yaïch, Blida =

Coordinates: 36°30′14″N 2°51′43″E

Ouled Yaïch
- Commune and town
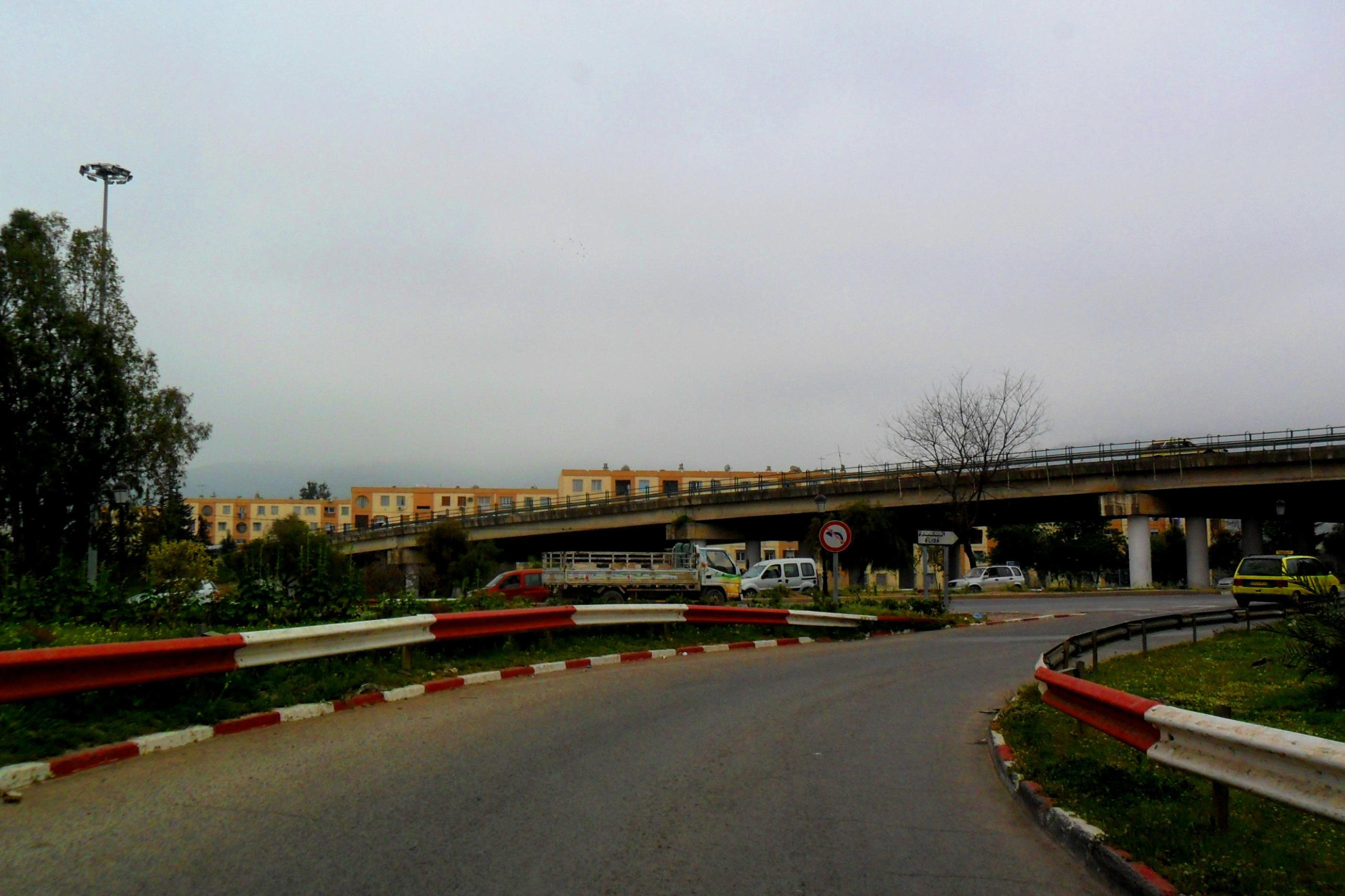
- Ouled Yaïch

- Map of Blida province, highlighting the Ouled Yaich commune
- Country: Algeria
- Province: Blida Province

Population (1998)
  - Total: 55,719
- Time zone: UTC+1 (CET)

Ouled Yaïch is a town and commune in Blida Province, Algeria, and the capital of the Ouled Yaïch District. According to the 1998 census it has a population of 55,719.

== Gallery ==
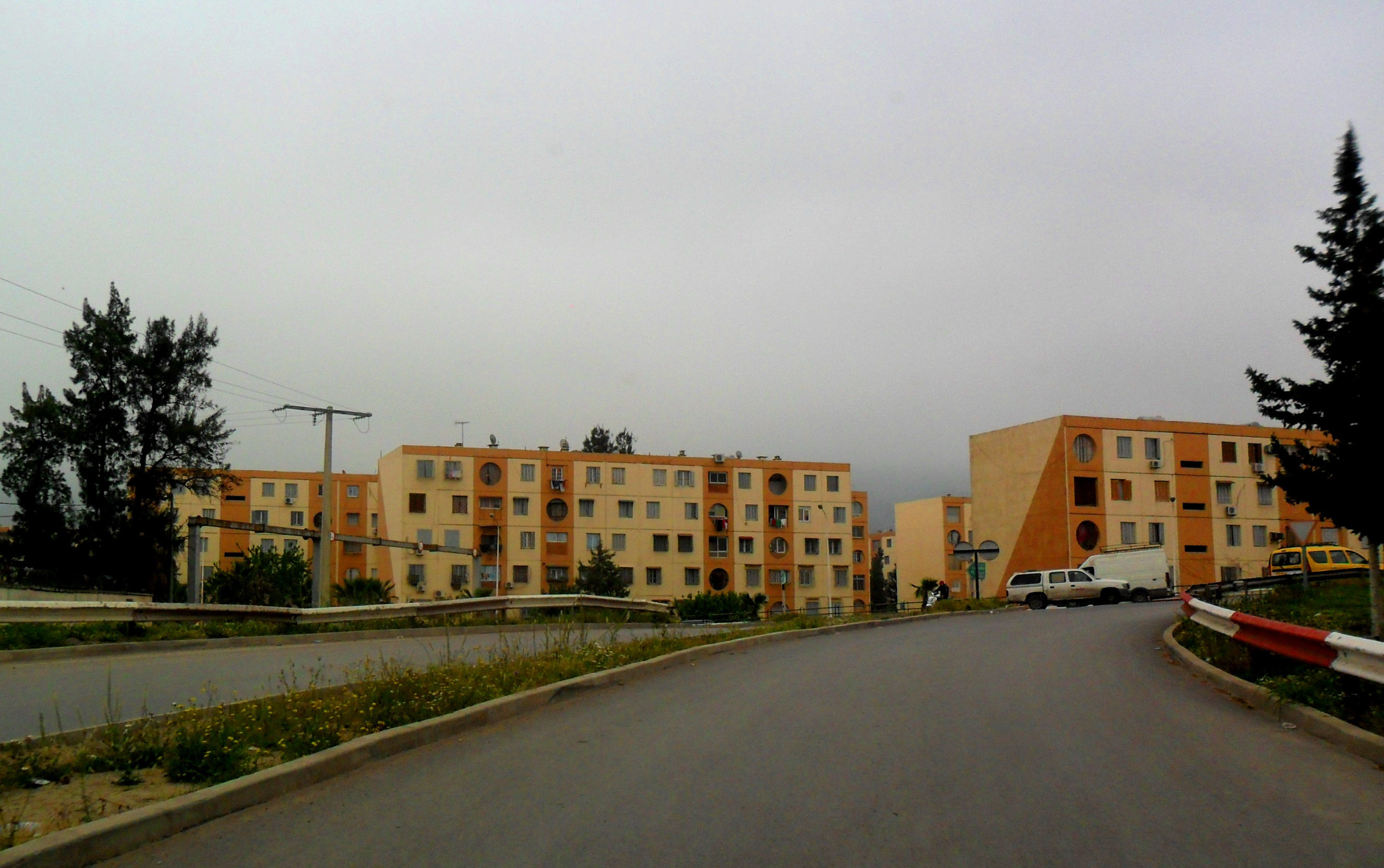

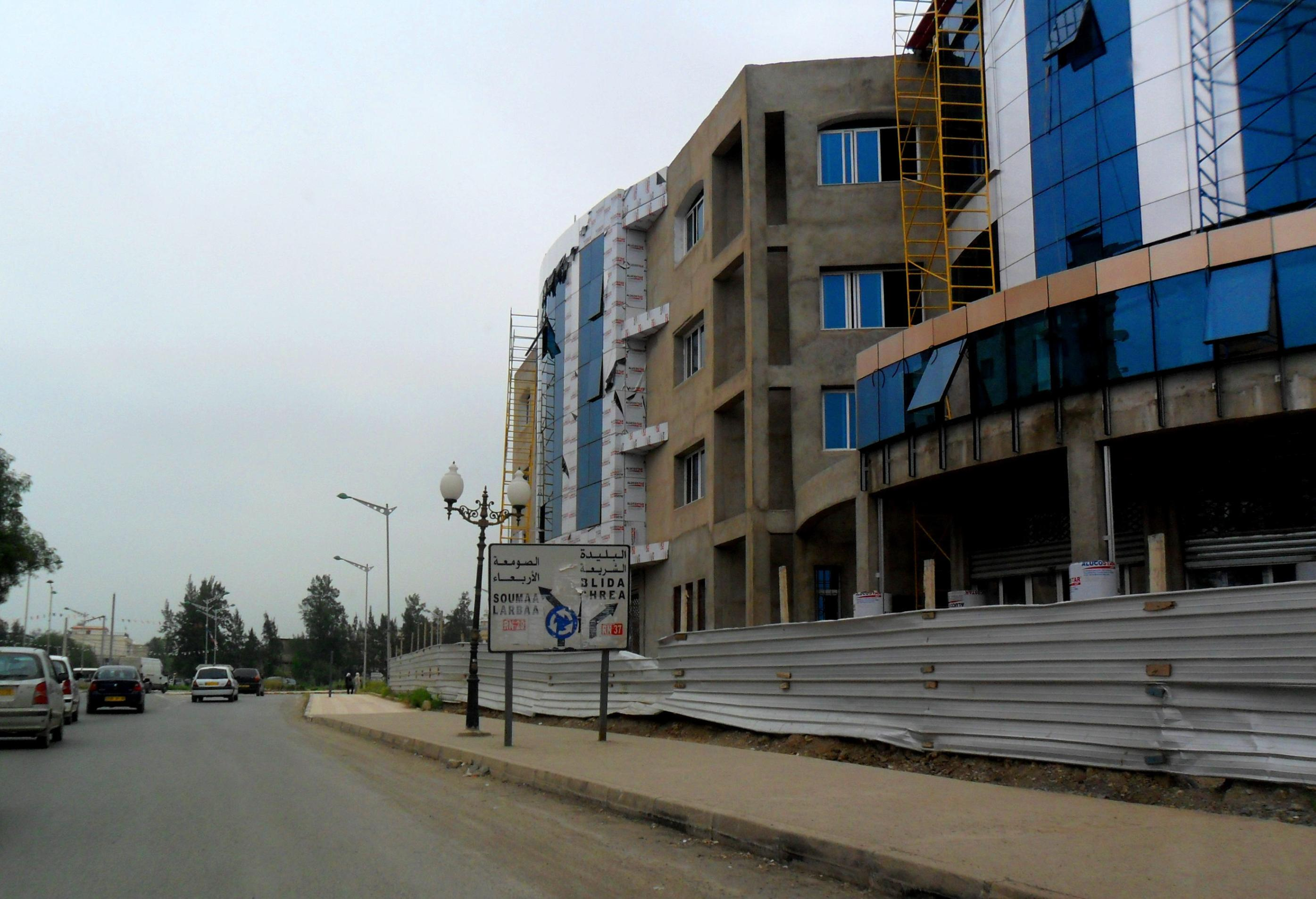

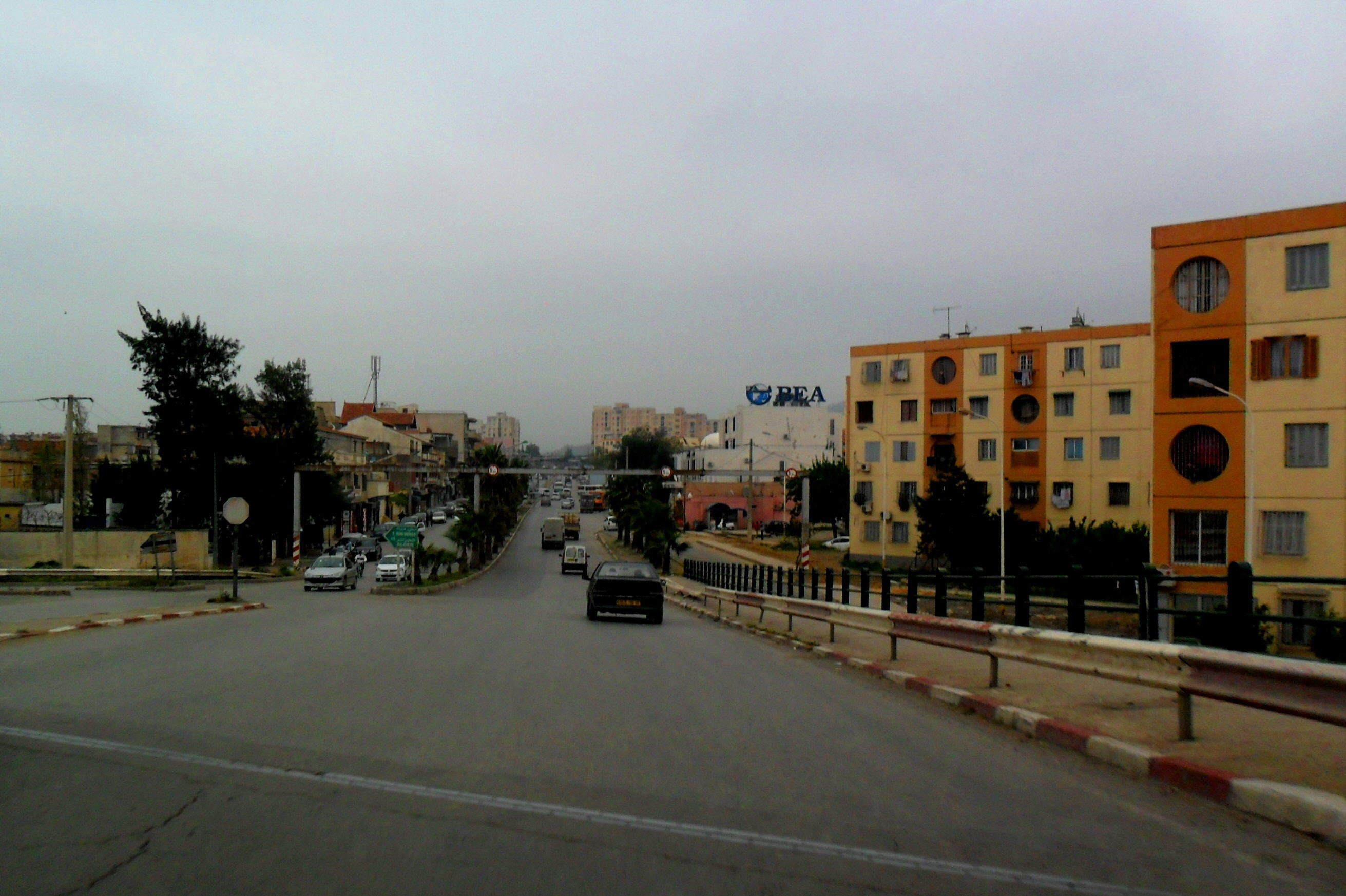

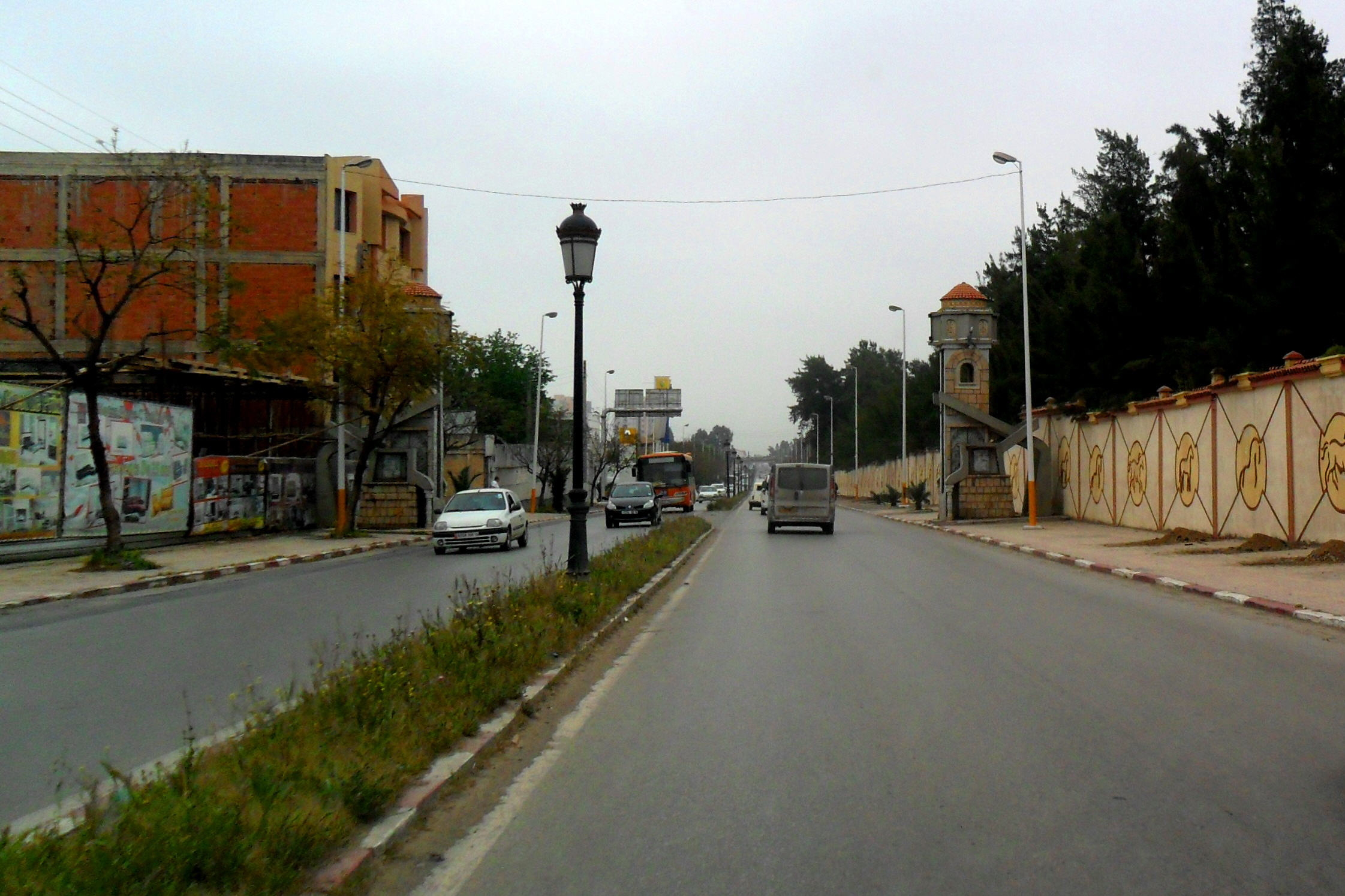
