= Behir Chergui =

Coordinates: 35.790804°N 7.717896°E

- Commune and town
- Interactive map of Behir Chergui
- Country: Algeria
- Province: Oum El Bouaghi Province
- Time zone: UTC+1 (CET)

Behir Chergui is a town and commune in Oum El Bouaghi Province, Algeria.

== Localities of the commune ==
The commune is composed of 5 localities:

- Centre Behir Chergui
- Bir Cheb
- Guelta Zergua
- Sersouf Mechtab
- Ain Keskes
