= El Fedjoudj Boughrara Saoudi =

El Fedjoudj Boughrara Saoudi الفجوج بوغرارة سعودى
- Commune and town
- Coordinates: 35.70805°N 6.817017°E
- Country: Algeria
- Province: Oum El Bouaghi Province

Population (2008)
  - Total: 4,169
- Time zone: UTC+1 (CET)

El Fedjoudj Boughrara Saoudi is a town and commune in Oum El Bouaghi Province, Algeria. According to the 1998 census, it has a population of 3, 658.

== Localities of the commune ==
The commune is composed of 13 localities:

- Boughrara Saoudi El Fedjoudj centre
- Saffane
- El Houadsa
- Guern El Maghsel
- Bir El Guern
- El Henada
- Ank El Djemel
- Fedj Errih
- Aïn Karma
- Gabel Guellil
- Cherchar
- Benhineh
- Gabe Echabka
