= El Amiria =

- Commune and town

- Location within Algeria
- Coordinates: 36°6′42″N 6°52′56″E
- Country: Algeria
- Province: Oum El Bouaghi Province

Area
  - Total: 64 sq mi (165 km^{2})

Population (2008)
  - Total: 10,416
- Time zone: UTC+1 (CET)

El Amiria is a town and commune in Oum El Bouaghi Province, Algeria. According to the 1998 census it has a population of 9795.

== Localities of the commune ==
The commune is composed of 29 localities:

- El Amiria Centre
- Ouled Naceur
- Ouled Djelila
- Merouet Lemjaz
- Gabel El Galaa
- Ouled Si Moussa
- Ras Aïn El Bordj
- Safel Aïn El Bordj
- Aïn El Kaïd
- Aïn Safa
- Magroun El Malah
- Bir Lekda
- Faoum Lahlig
- Hadjeret Tlalès
- Chabet Tahli
- El Ouassaa
- Dahr El Fartas
- Oued EU Kleb
- Henchir Mohamed Ben Aïssa
- Henchir Mohamed Ben Saadi
- Henchir Hazam
- Centre Ouled Nacer
- Retba Baïda
- Draa Tabal
- Boughiel
- Aïn El Mers
- Saharoua
- Bir Makhlouf
- Aïn El Kahla
- El Kébira
