= Aïn Zitoun =

Coordinates: 35°41′04″N 6°56′08″E

- Commune and town
- Country: Algeria
- Province: Oum El Bouaghi Province

Population (1998)
  - Total: 5,993
- Time zone: UTC+1 (CET)

Aïn Zitoun is a town and commune in Oum El Bouaghi Province, Algeria. According to the 1998 census it has a population of 5993.

== Localities of the commune ==
The commune is composed of 9 localities:

- Draa Tafza
- Foum Anba
- Fedjoudj
- Thniet El Kebch
- Guillif
- Rak Rak
- Cheracher
- M`Zair
- Boual
