= El Harmilia =

Coordinates: 35.923532°N 6.619263°E

- Commune and town
- Interactive map of El Harmilia
- Country: Algeria
- Province: Oum El Bouaghi Province

Population (1998)
  - Total: 7,122
- Time zone: UTC+1 (CET)

El Harmilia is a town and commune in Oum El Bouaghi Province, Algeria. According to the 1998 census it has a population of 7122.
