= Oued Nini =

Coordinates: 35°40′N 7°18′E

- Commune and town
- Interactive map of Oued Nini
- Country: Algeria
- Province: Oum El Bouaghi Province

Population (1998)
  - Total: 4,851
- Time zone: UTC+1 (CET)

Oued Nini is a town and commune in Oum El Bouaghi Province, Algeria. According to the 1998 census it has a population of 4851.
