= Sigus =

Sigus سيقوس
- Commune and town
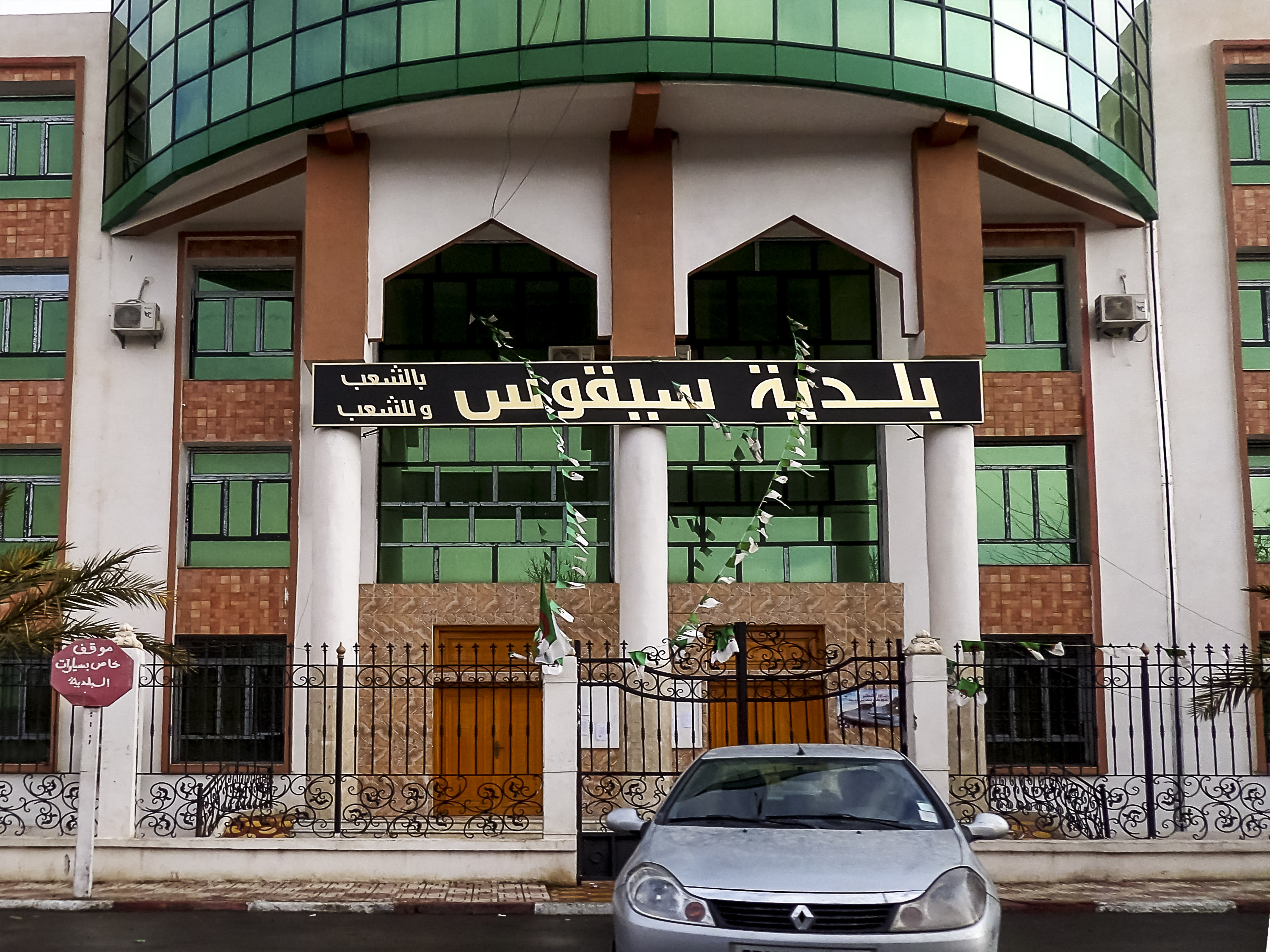

- Location within Algeria
- Coordinates: 36°7′N 6°47′E
- Country: Algeria
- Province: Oum El Bouaghi Province
- District: Sigus District

Area
  - Total: 80 sq mi (207 km^{2})

Population (2008)
  - Total: 17,598
- Time zone: UTC+1 (CET)
- Code postal: 04335

Sigus is a town and commune in Oum El Bouaghi Province, Algeria. According to the 1998 census it has a population of 14,944.

== Localities of the commune ==
The commune of Sigus is composed of 23 localities:

- Centre de Sigus
- Bir Tandja
- Theniet Ben Djeiter
- Taxas
- Bir Merzak
- Hazam Ben Abdallah
- Boucheri
- Grar Touam
- Boute biben
- Guelt Saker
- Chabet El Ma
- Merabet Toumi
- Melaab
- Dekkiche
- Tassa
- Hamoudi
- El Ksar
- Halimi
- Reghdi
- Ras El Aïn
- Theleth El Hemri
- Zaouia Bouhdjar
- Satha
