= Rahia =

Coordinates: 35°43′N 7°40′E

- Commune and town
- Interactive map of Rahia
- Country: Algeria
- Province: Oum El Bouaghi Province

Population (1998)
  - Total: 2,741
- Time zone: UTC+1 (CET)

Rahia is a town and commune in Oum El Bouaghi Province, Algeria.
