= El Belala =

- Commune and town
- Coordinates: 35.665278°N 7.788333°E
- Country: Algeria
- Province: Oum El Bouaghi Province

Area
  - Total: 69 sq mi (180 km^{2})

Population (2008)
  - Total: 2,477
- Time zone: UTC+1 (CET)

El Belala is a town and commune in Oum El Bouaghi Province, Algeria.

== Localities of the commune ==
The commune is composed of 9 localities:

- Ouled Yahia
- Hamadja
- Meliana
- Sersouf
- Zitouna
- M`Hada
- Mezaz Tebessa
- Argoub Laraneb
- Boussaada
