= Aïn Babouche =

Coordinates: 35°56′28″N 7°11′08″E

Aïn Babouche عين ببوش
- Commune and town
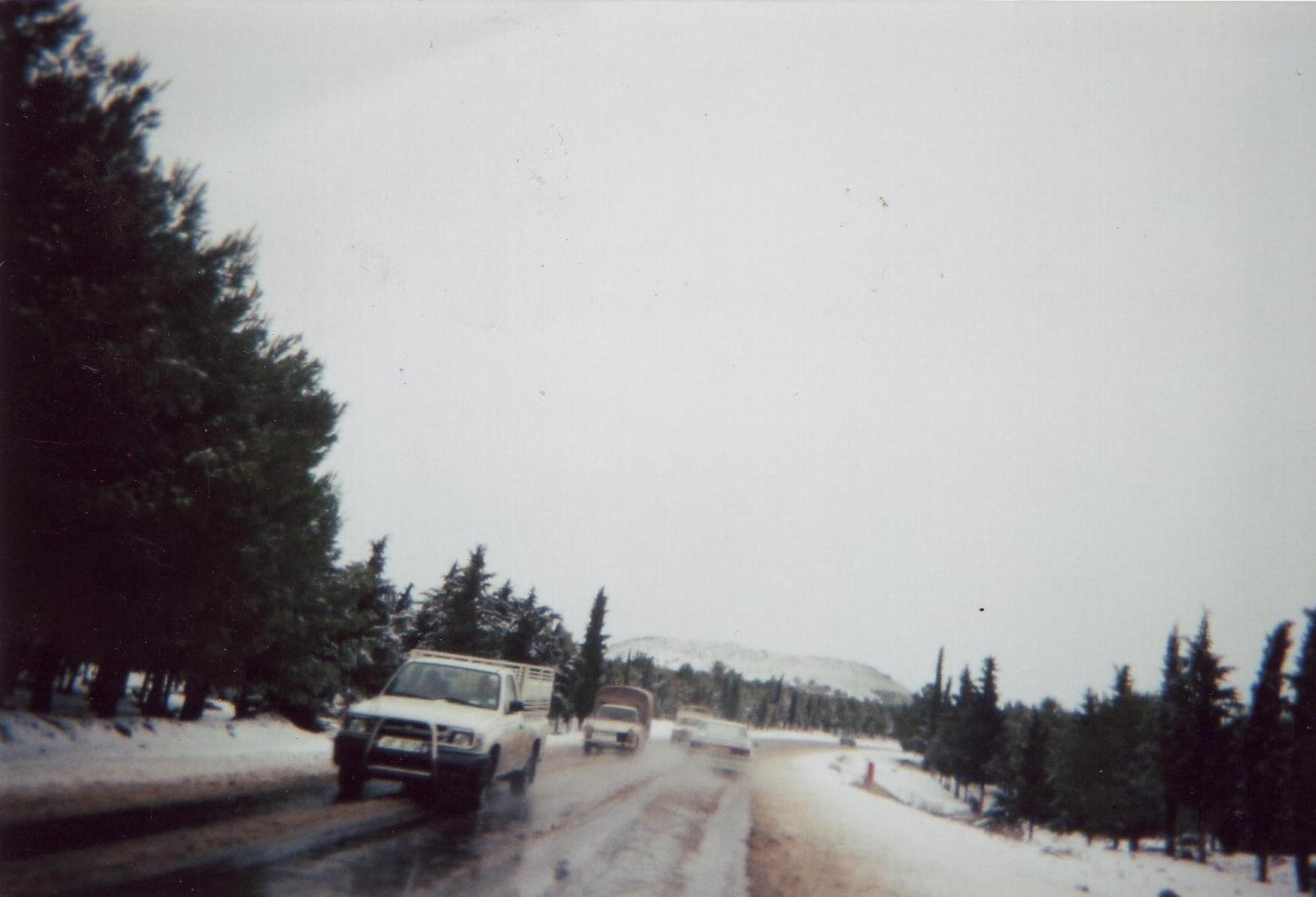
- The high plains under the snow (Ain Babouche)

- Ain Babouche within Laghouat Province
- Country: Algeria
- Province: Oum El Bouaghi Province
- District: Aïn Babouche

Area
  - Total: 77 sq mi (199 km^{2})

Population (2008)
  - Total: 16,129
  - Density: 210/sq mi (81.1/km^{2})
- Time zone: UTC+1 (CET)

Aïn Babouche is a town and commune in Oum El Bouaghi Province, Algeria. According to the 1998 census, it has a population of 14,597.

== Localities of the commune ==
The commune of Aïn Babouche is composed of 13 localities:

- Aïn Babouche Centre
- Bir Cheham
- Bouathmane
- Leghdir
- Bir Latrous
- Hamimat
- Ain Guettar
- Sensa
- Ain Lahma
- Henchir Abees
- Saf El Hassi
- Menchar
- El Malah
