= Zurg (Toy Story franchise) =

Fictional character

Evil Emperor Zurg is a fictional character from the Toy Story and Buzz Lightyear franchise. Zurg is the archenemy of Buzz Lightyear.

== Role in Toy Story 1 ==
In Toy Story, Buzz claims that he's on a mission to thwart the menace of “Evil Emperor Zurg, sworn enemy of the Galactic Alliance” and that Zurg is on the verge of creating a Planet destroying superweapon.

== Role in Toy Story 2 ==
In Toy Story 2, Rex plays a Buzz Lightyear video game with Zurg as the antagonist. A Zurg toy later believes himself to be real and claims to be Buzz’s father. After falling from an elevator, Zurg plays catch with utility belt Buzz. Zurg is voiced by Andrew Stanton.

== Role in Buzz Lightyear of Star Command: The Adventure Begins ==
Zurg is the main villain of Buzz Lightyear of Star Command: The Adventure Begins wherein he is played by Wayne Knight who had priorly played Al in Toy Story 2. Zurg conspires to bribe Buzz’s partner Warp Darkmatter into betraying him, tries to enslave the known Universe to a Borg-like Hive mind and conspires to destroy the planet of widow and orphans but is thwarted by Buzz and his team.

== Role in Buzz Lightyear of Star Command ==
Knight reprised his role in the Buzz Lightyear television show wherein he was an antagonist (or strongly affiliated with the antagonists) for almost every episode. Zurg claimed to be Buzz’s father in the episode Stranger Invasion but immediately followed up with “Psyche! Made you look, you dimwit.” Zurg also attempted to create a Planet Destroyer in the episode Planet Destroyer and teamed up with Buzz against an alien race called the Heed. Zurg was played comically in the show. Tad Stones said that the goal with Zurg was that: 1) He’d not cease to be funny and 2) He not cease to be a threat.

== Role in Toy Story 3 ==
A Zurg toy has a cameo in Toy Story 3.

== Role in Lightyear ==
In Lightyear, Zurg is the main antagonist (played by James Brolin) and is revealed (in a Plot twist) to be an evil time traveling version of Buzz representing what Buzz would become if he didn't accept his mistakes. This twist was divisive resulting in fan speculations that the future Buzz had only stolen Zurg’s identity. The director Angus MacLane explicitly confirmed this theory as correct.

== Role in Toy Story 5 ==
In Toy Story 5, Buzz Lightyear shocks the other Buzz Lightyear toys by telling them “Zurg is our dad.”
