= Hanchir Toumghani =

Coordinates: 36.021891°N 6.696167°E

- Commune and town
- Interactive map of Hanchir Toumghani
- Country: Algeria
- Province: Oum El Bouaghi Province

Population (1998)
  - Total: 18,775
- Time zone: UTC+1 (CET)

Hanchir Toumghani is a town and commune in Oum El Bouaghi Province, Algeria. According to the 1998 census it has a population of 18,775.
