= Bir Chouhada =

Coordinates: 35°53′40″N 6°17′24″E

- Commune and town
- Country: Algeria
- Province: Oum El Bouaghi Province

Population (1998)
  - Total: 8,356
- Time zone: UTC+1 (CET)

Bir Chouhada is a town and commune in Oum El Bouaghi Province, Algeria. According to the 1998 census it has a population of 8356.

== Localities of the commune ==
The commune is composed of 18 localities:

- Centre Bir Chouhada
- Hamour
- Chouf
- Aghled
- Sedjra
- Henchir
- Tarf
- Azerou
