= Ouled Gacem =

Coordinates: 36°02′03″N 6°39′57″E

- Commune and town
- Interactive map of Ouled Gacem
- Country: Algeria
- Province: Oum El Bouaghi Province

Population (1998)
  - Total: 6,273
- Time zone: UTC+1 (CET)

Ouled Gacem is a town and commune in Oum El Bouaghi Province, Algeria. According to the 1998 census it has a population of 6,273.
