= Dhalaa =

Dhalaa الضلعة
- Commune and town
- Location of the municipality in the wilaya of Oum El Bouaghi.
- Coordinates: 35.46111°N 7.547222°E
- Country: Algeria
- Province: Oum El Bouaghi Province

Area
  - Total: 79 sq mi (205 km^{2})

Population (2008)
  - Total: 11,439
- Time zone: UTC+1 (CET)

Dhalaa is a town and commune in Oum El Bouaghi Province, Algeria.

== Localities of the commune ==
The commune is composed of 21 localities:

- Centre de Dhalâa
- Raf Raf
- Messlaf
- Benaïm
- Gabel Zebar
- Ouled Chamiekh
- Reggada
- Argoub Tine
- Gabel Lefdjidjet
- Dagher
- Fedj Tine
- Oglia
- Dhahret El Oued
- Gabel Boutekhma
- Argoub El Bey
- Henchir El Khadem
- Lekmine
- Ayoune Dekhakhène
- Lehguina
- Remaïdia
- Ras Zebar
- Kef El Aks
