= El Djazia =

El Djazia الجازية
- Commune and town
- Coordinates: 35.663154°N 7.507954°E
- Country: Algeria
- Province: Oum El Bouaghi Province

Population (2008)
  - Total: 3,878
- Time zone: UTC+1 (CET)

El Djazia is a town and commune in Oum El Bouaghi Province, Algeria. According to the 1998 census it has a population of 3318.

== Localities of the commune ==
The commune is composed of 11 localities:

- El Djazia
- Draa El Makhzen
- Fedj Tine
- Ras Nini
- Ouled Amara
- Gabel El M`Kazine
- Forn
- Madjen
- Fjijet
- Bir Makhlouf
- Bir Satla
