= Berriche =

- Commune and town
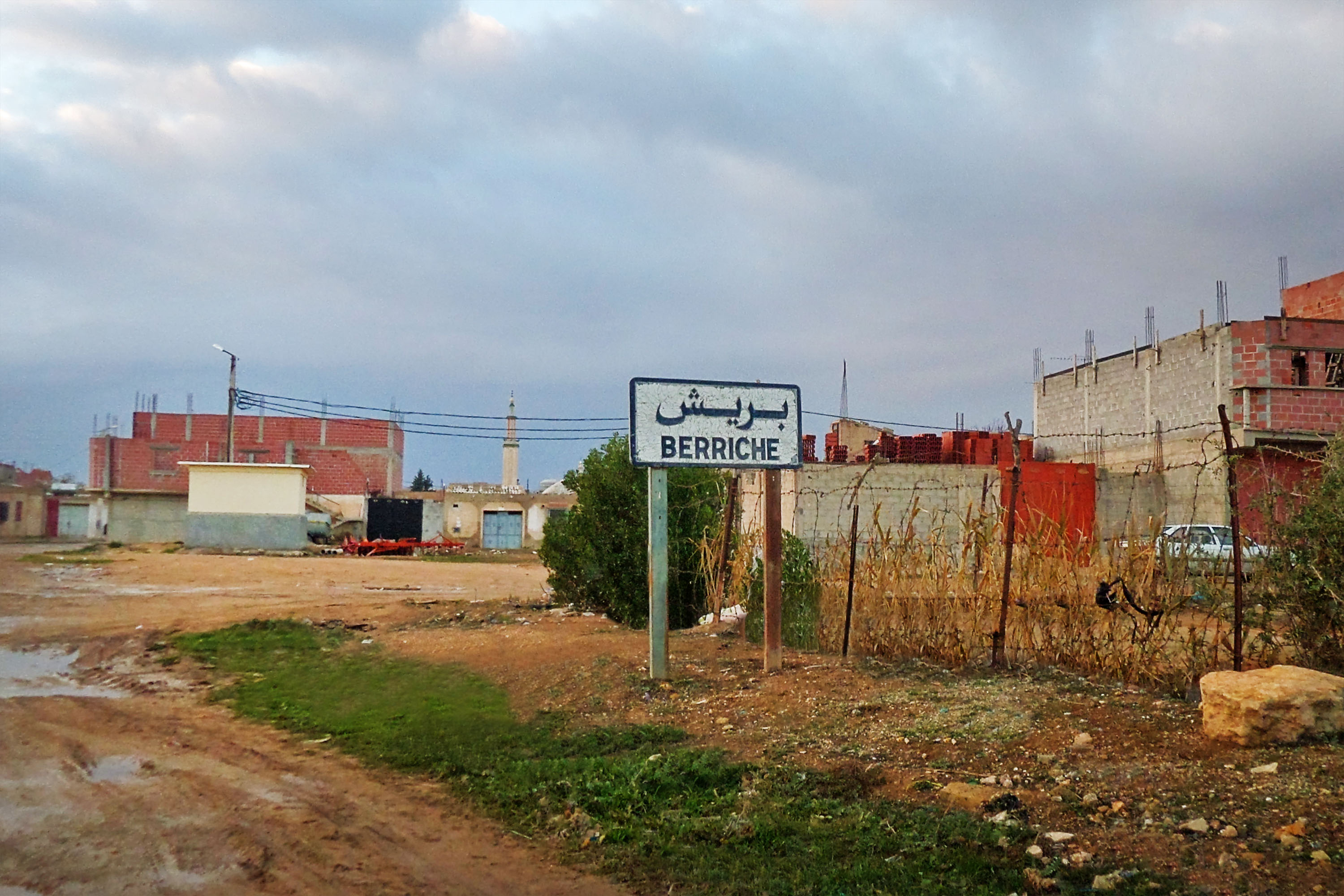

- Location within Algeria
- Coordinates: 35°55′N 7°23′E
- Country: Algeria
- Province: Oum El Bouaghi Province

Population (1998)
  - Total: 16,274
- Time zone: UTC+1 (CET)

Berriche is a town and commune in Oum El Bouaghi Province, Algeria. According to the 1998 census it has a population of 16,274.

== Localities of the commune ==
The commune is composed of 18 localities:

- Mellaha
- Leghdir
- Safel El Ouessaa
- Rotbet
- El Baylek
- Bir Djedid
- El Henchir
- Oued Dahmane
- Gbel Lahteb
- Dahre Lahteb
- Ras El Hassi
- Bir Beida
- Beririche
- Boudhana
- Men Guebla
- Men Dahra
- Bir Rogaa
