= Aïn Fakroun =

Coordinates: 35°58′N 6°52′E

- Commune and town
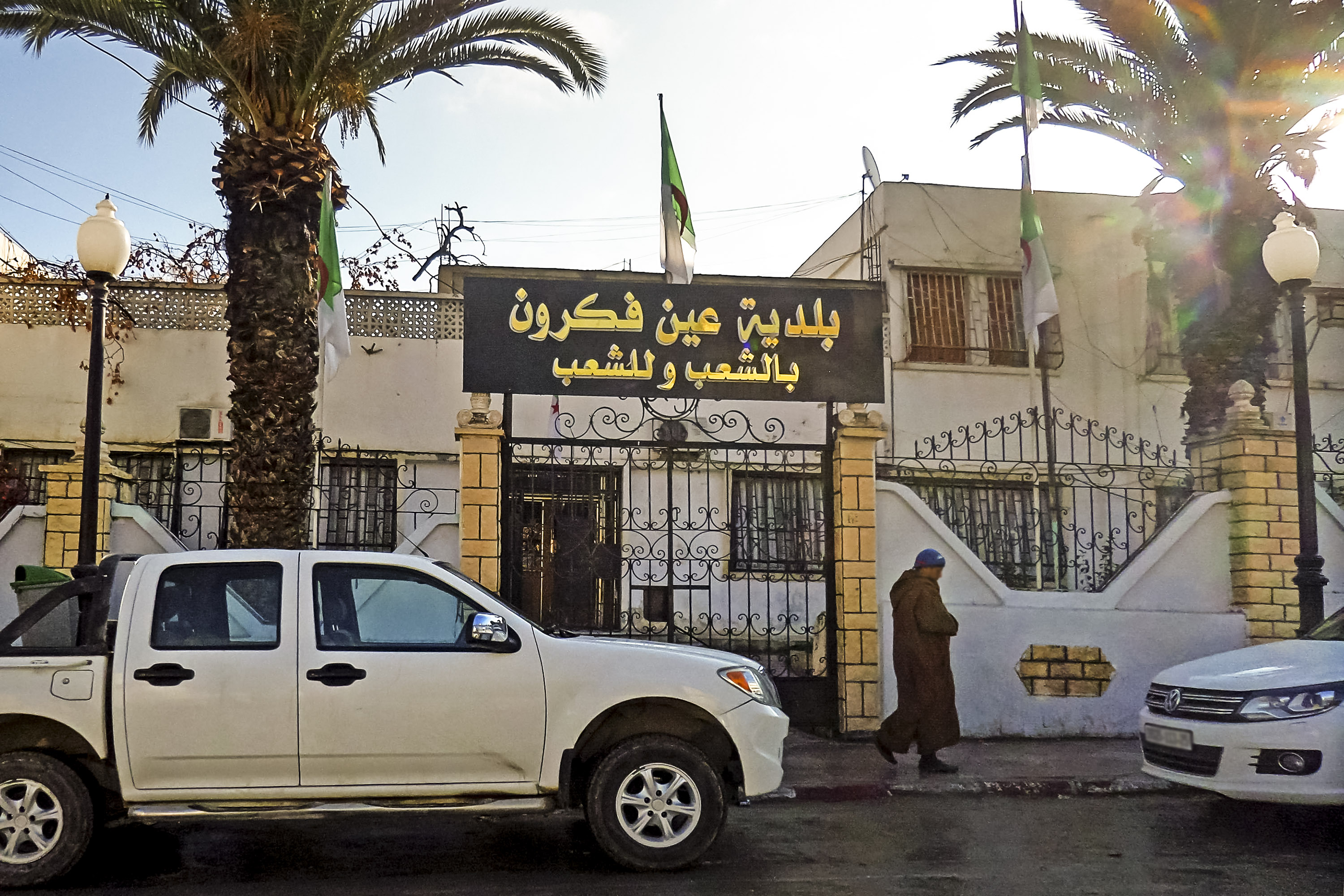
- Interactive map of Aïn Fakroun
- Country: Algeria
- Province: Oum El Bouaghi Province

Population (2008)
  - Total: 48,804
- Time zone: UTC+1 (CET)

Aïn Fakroun is a town and commune in Algeria. According to the 2008 census, it has a population of 48,804.

== Localities of the commune ==
The commune of Aïn Fakroun is composed of 28 localities:

- Ville d’Aïn Fakroun
- Aïn Beida Safel Houara
- Zarita
- Dahr El Ferroukh
- Garn El Ferroukh
- Aïn Dahraouia
- Bir Latrous
- Chouf Daba
- Bir Kechba
- Tala
- Rezdane
- Abdelmoumen
- Bir Serahna
- Theniet Bouafia
- Safel Bousbaa
- Louastania
- Gablia Boursas
- Enaa
- Djellab
- Bir Rayamne
- Tarkouine
- Karchouna
- Dahraouia
- Oum Kecherid
- Henchir
- Baroud
- Bir Chaab
- Foum El Mouzabi
