= Oum El Bouaghi =

Oum El Bouaghi أم البواقي
- City
- city of Oum El Bouaghi
- Location of Oum El Bouaghi within Oum El Bouaghi Province

- Location of Oum El Bouaghi within Algeria
- Coordinates: 35°52′39″N 7°6′49″E
- Country: Algeria
- Province: Oum El Bouaghi (seat)
- District: Oum El Bouaghi (seat)

Government
  - PMA Seats: 15
- Elevation: 902 m (2,959 ft)

Population (2008 Census)
  - Total: 80,359
- Time zone: UTC+01 (CET)
- Postal code: 04000
- ONS code: 0401

Oum El Bouaghi (Arabic: أم البواقي) is a municipality in Algeria. It is the capital of Oum El Bouaghi Province.

== Localities ==
Oum El Bouaghi is composed of 25 localities

- Oum El Bouaghi-ville
- Bir Kechba
- Mekhalfa
- Sedjra
- F'Kirina
- Ras F'Kirina
- Laïoun
- Merigueb
- Ras Medfoun
- Tagouft Kébira
- Tagouft Seghira
- Fid Meslou
- Village Sidi rghiss
- Ali Ouidir
- Bir Terch
- Draa Laghbar
- Fid Souar
- Lahteb
- Laskria
- Aïn Seïd
- Bir Sahli
- Dahnoune
- El Hamra
- Lemoujah
- Stoh
