= Zorg, Algeria =

Coordinates: 35°51′N 7°28′E

- Commune and town
- Interactive map of Zorg, Algeria
- Country: Algeria
- Province: Oum El Bouaghi Province

Population (1998)
  - Total: 1,736
- Time zone: UTC+1 (CET)

Zorg, Algeria is a town and commune in Oum El Bouaghi Province, Algeria. According to the 1998 census it has a population of 1,736.
