= Souk Naamane =

- Commune and town
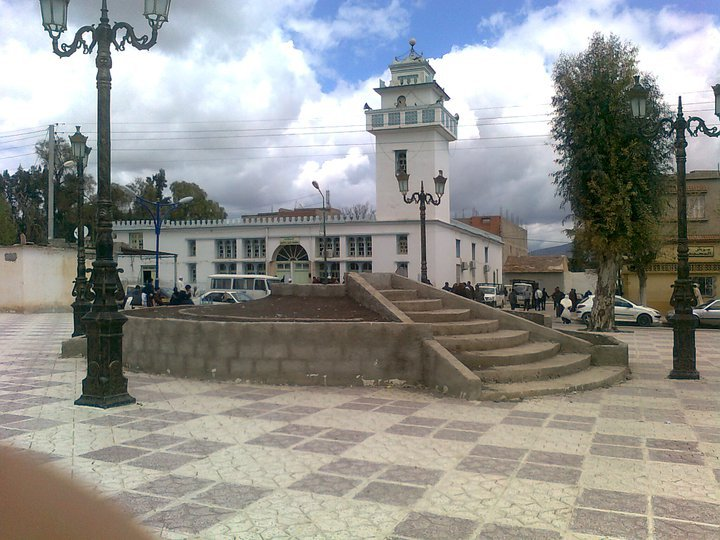
- Souk Naamane

- Location within Algeria
- Coordinates: 35°53′45″N 6°23′22″E
- Country: Algeria
- Province: Oum El Bouaghi Province
- District: Souk Naâmane District

Area
  - Total: 88 sq mi (227 km^{2})

Population (2008)
  - Total: 23,988
- Time zone: UTC+1 (CET)
- code postal: 04325

Souk Naamane is a town and commune in Oum El Bouaghi Province, Algeria. According to the 1998 census it has a population of 23,018.
