= Ouled Zouaï =

Coordinates: 35°50′10″N 6°30′24″E

- Commune and town
- Interactive map of Ouled Zouaï
- Country: Algeria
- Province: Oum El Bouaghi Province

Population (1998)
  - Total: 4,578
- Time zone: UTC+1 (CET)

Ouled Zouaï is a town and commune in Oum El Bouaghi Province, Algeria. According to the 1998 census it has a population of 4,578.
