= Oum El Bouaghi Province =

Province of Algeria

Oum El Bouaghi Province ولاية أم البواقي
- Province
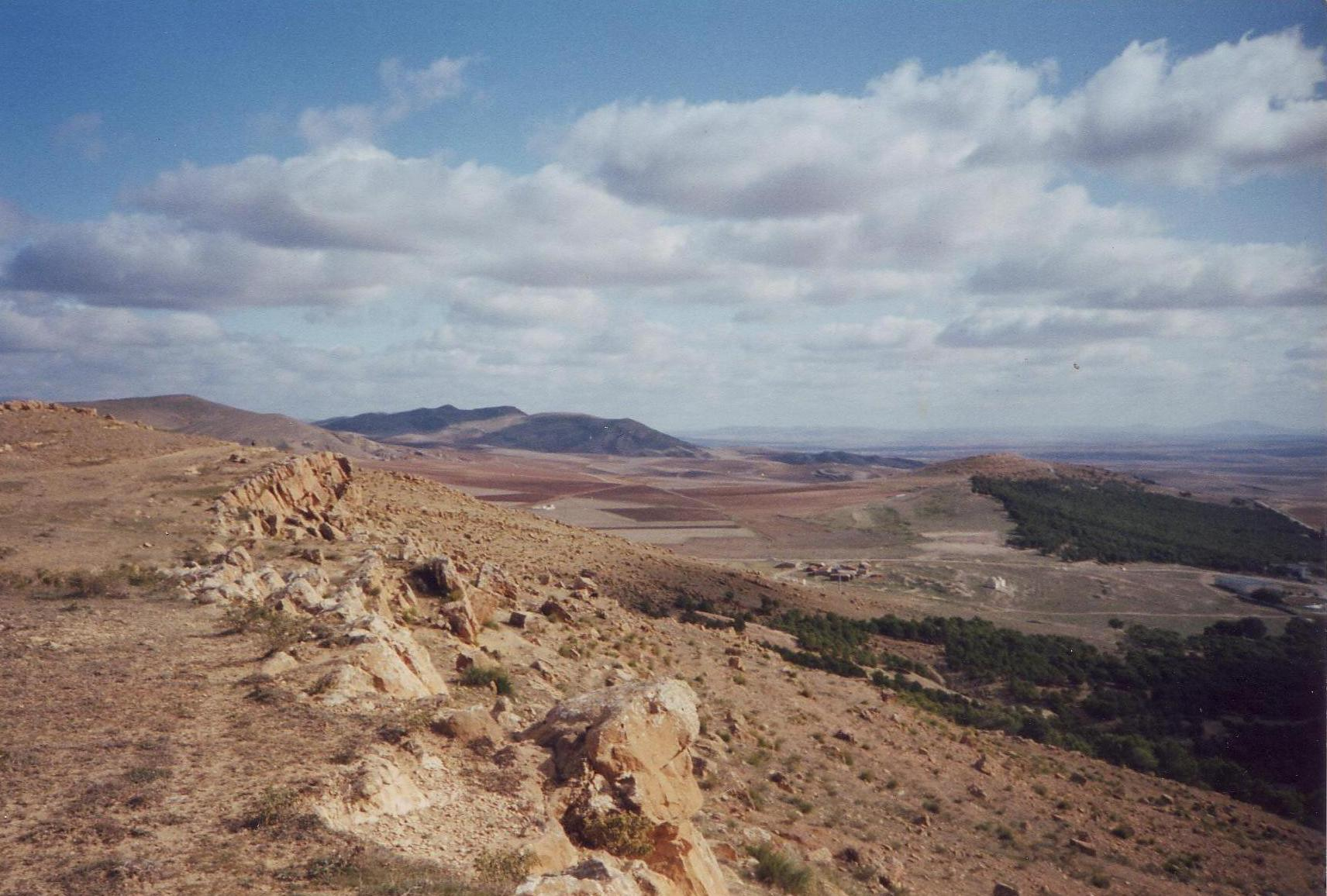
- The Hautes Plaines in Oum El Bouaghi

- Map of Algeria highlighting Oum El Bouaghi
- Coordinates: 35°53′N 7°7′E
- Country: Algeria
- Capital: Oum El Bouaghi

Government
  - PPA president: Mr. Chouia Taha Hocine (FLN)
  - Wāli: Mr. Benabdallah Chaïb Eddour

Area
  - Total: 6,768 km^{2} (2,613 sq mi)

Population (2008)
  - Total: 644,364
  - Density: 95.21/km^{2} (246.6/sq mi)
- Time zone: UTC+01 (CET)
- Area Code: +213 (0) 32
- ISO 3166 code: DZ-04
- Districts: 12
- Municipalities: 29

Oum El Bouaghi or Oum el-Bouaghi (Arabic: ولاية أم البواقي) is a province (wilaya) of Algeria in the Aures region. The capital is Oum el-Bouaghi, which was named Can Robert (during French occupation). It was named Sidi R'Ghis a few years later, and Oum El Bouaghi before independence.

== History ==
The province was created from Constantine (department) in 1974.

In 1984, Khenchela Province and Mila Province were carved out of its territory.

== Administrative divisions ==
The province is divided into 12 districts (daïras), which are further divided into 29 communes or municipalities.

=== Districts ===
1. Aïn Babouche
2. Aïn Beïda
3. Aïn Fakroun
4. Aïn Kechra
5. Aïn M'Lila
6. Dhalaâ
7. F'Kirina
8. Ksar Sbahi
9. Meskiana
10. Oum El Bouaghi
11. Sigus
12. Souk Naâmane

=== Communes ===
1. Aïn Babouche
2. Aïn Beïda
3. Aïn Diss
4. Aïn Fakroun
5. Aïn Kercha
6. Aïn M'lila
7. Aïn Zitoun
8. Behir Chergui
9. Berriche
10. Bir Chouhada
11. D'hala (Dhalaâ)
12. El Amiria
13. El Belala
14. El Djazia
15. El Fedjouz Boughrara Saoudi
16. El Harmilia
17. Fkirina (F'Kirina)
18. Hanchir Toumghani
19. Ksar Sbahi
20. Meskiana
21. Oued Nini
22. Ouled Gacem
23. Ouled Hamla
24. Ouled Zouaï
25. Oum El Bouaghi
26. Rahia
27. Sigus
28. Souk Naâmane
29. Zorg
