= Aïn M'lila =

- Commune and town
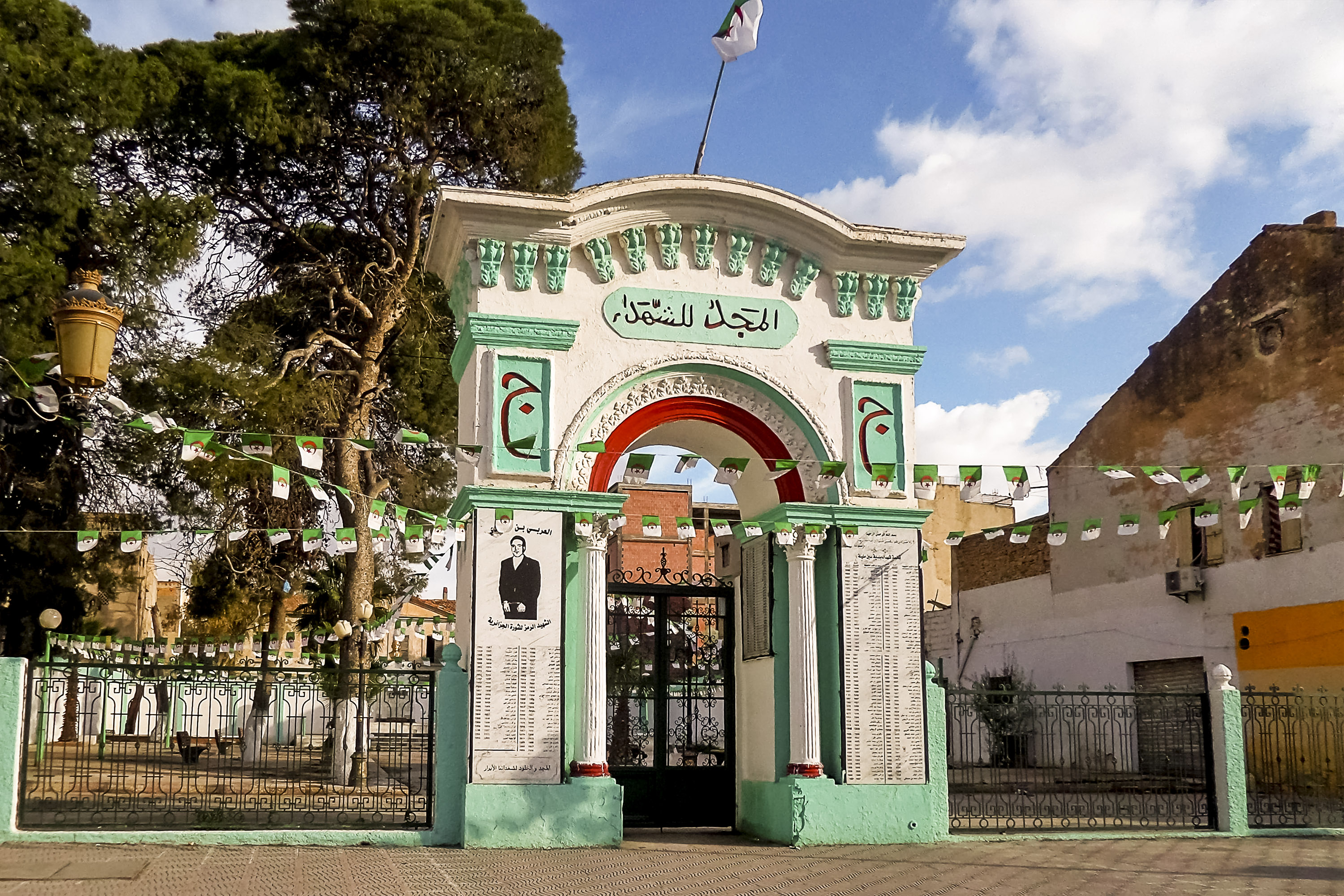

- Location in Algeria
- Coordinates: 36°02′10″N 6°34′15″E
- Country: Algeria
- Province: Oum El Bouaghi Province

Population (Census 2008)
  - Total: 88,441
- Time zone: UTC+1 (CET)

Aïn M'lila (Arabic: عين مليلة, Ayn Malīlah; which means "the white source", the root m-l-l being of Berber origin) is a town and commune in Oum El Bouaghi Province, Algeria. According to the 2008 census it has a population of 65,371. It is the home-town of Larbi Ben M'hidi, one of the most prominent Algerian leaders during the war of independence. It is the home of football club AS Ain M'lila that currently play in the Algerian Ligue Professionnelle 1 (first division).

== Localities of the commune ==
The commune is composed of 24 localities:

- Ville d'Aïn M'lila
- Centre de Fourchi
- village socialiste agricole de Fourchi
- Haddada Hadj Salah
- Haddada El Bir
- Bouchlouta Slib
- Frex Boukabep
- Moghniet
- Henchir Legraba
- Remada
- Fourchi
- Hallilif
- partie de la mechta El Malah
- Lemdarga
- Lamzara
- Henchir Ouled Zaïd
- Sedjra
- Roknia
- Ghar Tinn
- Agba Baïda
- Djid Malou
- Henchir Ouled Belaguel
- Ketf El Hassi
- Bir Benayed

== History ==
The first people known to have settled in the region are the Zemouls. They were the oldest and most formidable cavalry which was established in Aïn M'lila on the road between Constantine and Batna during the Ottoman Empire ruling. The Zemouls were a war like tribe whose chief military and administrative bore the title of zemala caid. On an order of the Bey, they would take up arms, to ride and lend a hand, or to punish the rebels, or to facilitate the implementation of administrative measures. For each about fifty horsemen, was called a chaouch which had only a purely military authority. Under the last Bey, Hadj Ahmed, they had more than five hundred horsemen commanded by ten or fifteen chaouche, as circumstances require.

=== World War I ===
As Algeria was a French colony many Algerians had participated in the War.

=== World War II ===
During the second world war a military airfield was built. It was built by the Army Corps of Engineers on a flat, dry lakebed at an altitude of 2580 feet, designed for heavy bomber use by the United States Army Air Force Twelfth Air Force during the North African Campaign with concrete runways, hardstands and taxiways.

Refer to Ain M'lila Airfield.
