= Oum El Adhaïm District =

Oum El Adhaïm District دائرة أم العظائم
- District
- Map of Algeria highlighting Souk Ahras Province
- Country: Algeria
- Province: Souk Ahras
- District seat: Oum El Adhaïm

Population (1998)
  - Total: 17,087
- Time zone: UTC+01 (CET)
- Municipalities: 3

Oum El Adhaïm is a district in Souk Ahras Province, Algeria. It was named after its capital, Oum El Adhaïm.

== Municipalities ==
The district is further divided into 3 municipalities:

- Oum El Adhaim
- Terraguelt
- Oued Keberit
