= Taoura District =

Coordinates: 36°10′12″N 8°02′34″E

Taoura District دائرة تاورة
- District
- Map of Algeria highlighting Souk Ahras Province
- Country: Algeria
- Province: Souk Ahras
- District seat: Taoura

Population (1998)
  - Total: 34,257
- Time zone: UTC+01 (CET)
- Municipalities: 3

Taoura is a district in Souk Ahras Province, Algeria named after its capital, Taoura. The district is further divided into 3 municipalities:

- Taoura
- Zaarouria
- Drea
