= Merahna District =

Coordinates: 36.1968°N 8.1742°E

Merahna District دائرة المراهنة
- District
- Map of Algeria highlighting Souk Ahras Province
- Country: Algeria
- Province: Souk Ahras
- District seat: Merahna

Population (1998)
  - Total: 25,398
- Time zone: UTC+01 (CET)
- Municipalities: 3

Merahna is a district in Souk Ahras Province, Algeria. It was named after its capital, Merahna.

== Municipalities ==
The district is further divided into 3 municipalities:

- Merahna
- Ouillen
- Sidi Fredj
