= M'Daourouch District =

Coordinates: 35°4′5″N 7°49′2″E

M'Daourouch District دائرة مداوروش
- District
- Map of Algeria highlighting Souk Ahras Province
- Country: Algeria
- Province: Souk Ahras
- District seat: M'Daourouch

Population (1998)
  - Total: 35,687
- Time zone: UTC+01 (CET)
- Municipalities: 3

M'Daourouch is a district in Souk Ahras Province, Algeria. It was named after its capital, M'Daourouch.

== Municipalities ==
The district is further divided into 3 municipalities:

- M'Daourouch
- Tiffech
- Ragouba
