= Integrated Phosphate Project =

Algerian mining and industrial project

The Integrated Phosphate Project (Arabic: مشروع الفوسفات المدمج) is a large-scale mining and industrial project in Algeria, aimed at extracting phosphate ore from the Bled El Hadba deposit and processing it into phosphate and nitrogen-based fertilizers for both domestic use and export. The project spans four provinces in eastern Algeria — Tébessa, Souk Ahras, Skikda and Annaba — and represents an estimated total investment of approximately $7 billion, making it Algeria's first fully integrated project combining mining extraction, chemical transformation and export within a single value chain.

Integrated Phosphate Project
Country	Algeria
Provinces	Tébessa · Souk Ahras · Skikda · Annaba
Operator	Sonatrach · Asmidal · Algerian Chinese Fertilizers Company (ACFC)
Investment	approx. US$7 billion
Construction started	November 2024
Expected commissioning	2027

== Background ==
The project was formally announced in 2022 with the signing of a partnership agreement establishing the Algerian Chinese Fertilizers Company (ACFC), a joint venture between Algerian state companies (holding a 56% stake) and Chinese partners (holding 44%). On 16 November 2024, Energy and Mines Minister Mohamed Arkab launched construction works at the Bled El Hadba mine site with the first blasting operation, marking the effective start of the project. The site's exploitable reserves are estimated to be sufficient for around 80 years of production.

== Components ==
The project consists of four integrated industrial hubs:

Hub	Location	Function
Mining and beneficiation	Main article: Bled El Hadba mine Bled El Hadba (Jebel El Onk), Bir El Ater, Tébessa Province	Extraction of raw phosphate ore at a capacity of 5.5 million tonnes per year, producing 3.2 million tonnes per year of beneficiated phosphate concentrate
Chemical processing	Oued Keberit, Souk Ahras Province	Integrated industrial complex producing 2.4 million tonnes per year of phosphate fertilizers and 570,000 tonnes per year of nitrogen fertilizer (urea), alongside intermediate products such as sulfuric acid, phosphoric acid and ammonia
Fertilizer finishing	Hadjar Essoud, Skikda Province	Final processing and packaging of fertilizer products for distribution and export
Export logistics	Port of Annaba	Expansion of the port and construction of a dedicated mining terminal to accommodate large vessels and export surplus production

The hubs are connected by an eastern mining railway line approximately 422 km long, linking Annaba, Souk Ahras, Tébessa and Bled El Hadba, serving as a strategic logistics corridor for transporting raw and processed material.

== Reserves and production capacity ==
Phosphate reserves in the Bled El Hadba area are estimated at over one billion tonnes, placing Algeria among the world's leading countries in phosphate reserves. The project is expected to raise Algeria's phosphate production from about 2.5 million tonnes per year to more than 10 million tonnes, with a fertilizer production target of around 5.4 million tonnes per year.

== Partnership and financing ==
The project is carried out through the Algerian Chinese Fertilizers Company (ACFC), in which Algerian state companies (Sonatrach and Asmidal) hold a 56% stake, with Chinese partners holding the remaining 44%. On 12 August 2026, Sonatrach and Asmidal signed two engineering, procurement and construction (EPC) contracts under a fast-track execution model:

Algerian party	International partner	Scope
Sonatrach / Asmidal	Saipem (Italy)	Construction of processing and fertilizer production facilities at Bled El Hadba and Oued Keberit
Sonatrach	China Harbour Engineering Company (CHEC)	Construction of port facilities at the Port of Annaba

== Economic impact ==
The project is expected to create around 12,000 jobs during the construction phase, and approximately 6,000 direct and 24,000 indirect jobs during the operational phase, as part of Algeria's broader strategy to diversify its economy away from hydrocarbons. The project's stated primary objective is to meet Algeria's growing domestic demand for agricultural fertilizers, with surplus production allocated for export, contributing to national food security and value-added industrial development.

== Timeline ==
Period	Event
2022	Formal announcement of the project and establishment of the Algerian Chinese Fertilizers Company (ACFC)
November 2024	Start of construction works at the Bled El Hadba mine with the first blasting operation
2024–2026	Site preparation and construction of associated infrastructure (railway, port)
August 2026	Signing of EPC construction contracts with Saipem and CHEC
Early 2027 (expected)	Commissioning and start of exports

== See also ==
- Bled El Hadba mine
- Phosphates
- Sonatrach
- Tébessa Province
- Souk Ahras Province
- Annaba Province
