= Compagnie des chemins de fer algériens de l'État =

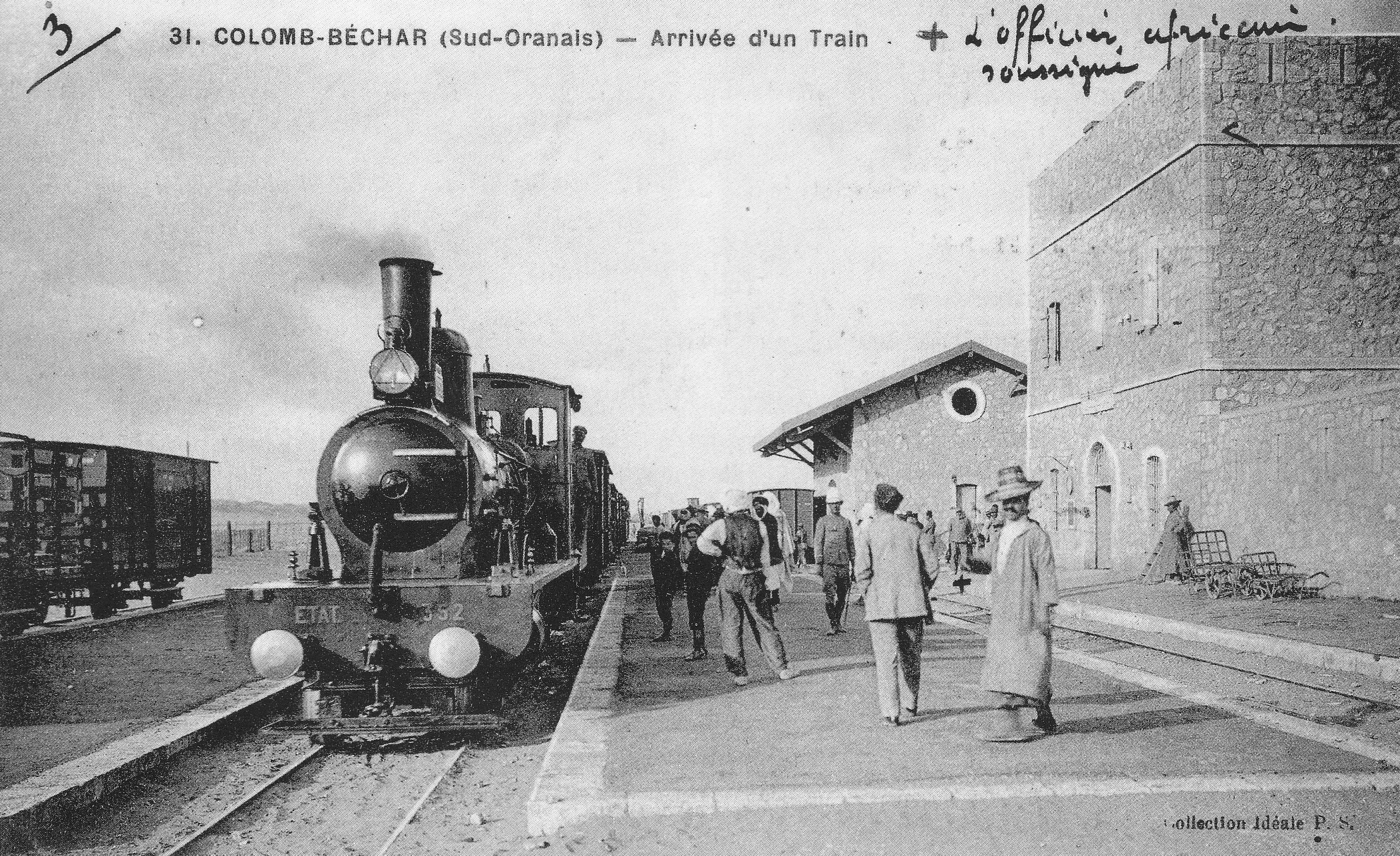
Colomb-Béchar station with locomotive 230 N°352.

The Compagnie des chemins de fer algériens de l'État (CFAE) was a French company established in 1908 in Algeria to operate a network of narrow-gauge railway lines in the regions of Constantine, Oran, and Bône.

== History ==
The company took over the assets of:

- Compagnie franco-algérienne
- Compagnie de l'Est algérien, which went bankrupt;
- Chemin de fer d'Aïn Beïda à Khenchela in 1908;
- Chemin de fer Bône-Guelma (April 1915);
- Chemin de fer Bône - Mokta - Saint-Charles;
- Chemin de fer de Bône à La Calle in 1921;
- Compagnie des Chemins de fer sur route d'Algérie;
- PLMA (Philippeville - Constantine line).

On July 2, 1907, the CFAE was granted a local interest railway from Mostaganem to Macta by the Oran department.

The CFAE company became one of the two railway operators, alongside the Compagnie des chemins de fer de Paris à Lyon et à la Méditerranée, on July 1, 1921, and the Algerian network was renamed PLMA. It was dissolved on May 30, 1938, nationalized, and integrated into the SNCF, and on January 1, 1939, it became part of the Office des chemins de fer algériens (OCFA).

== Network Evolution ==
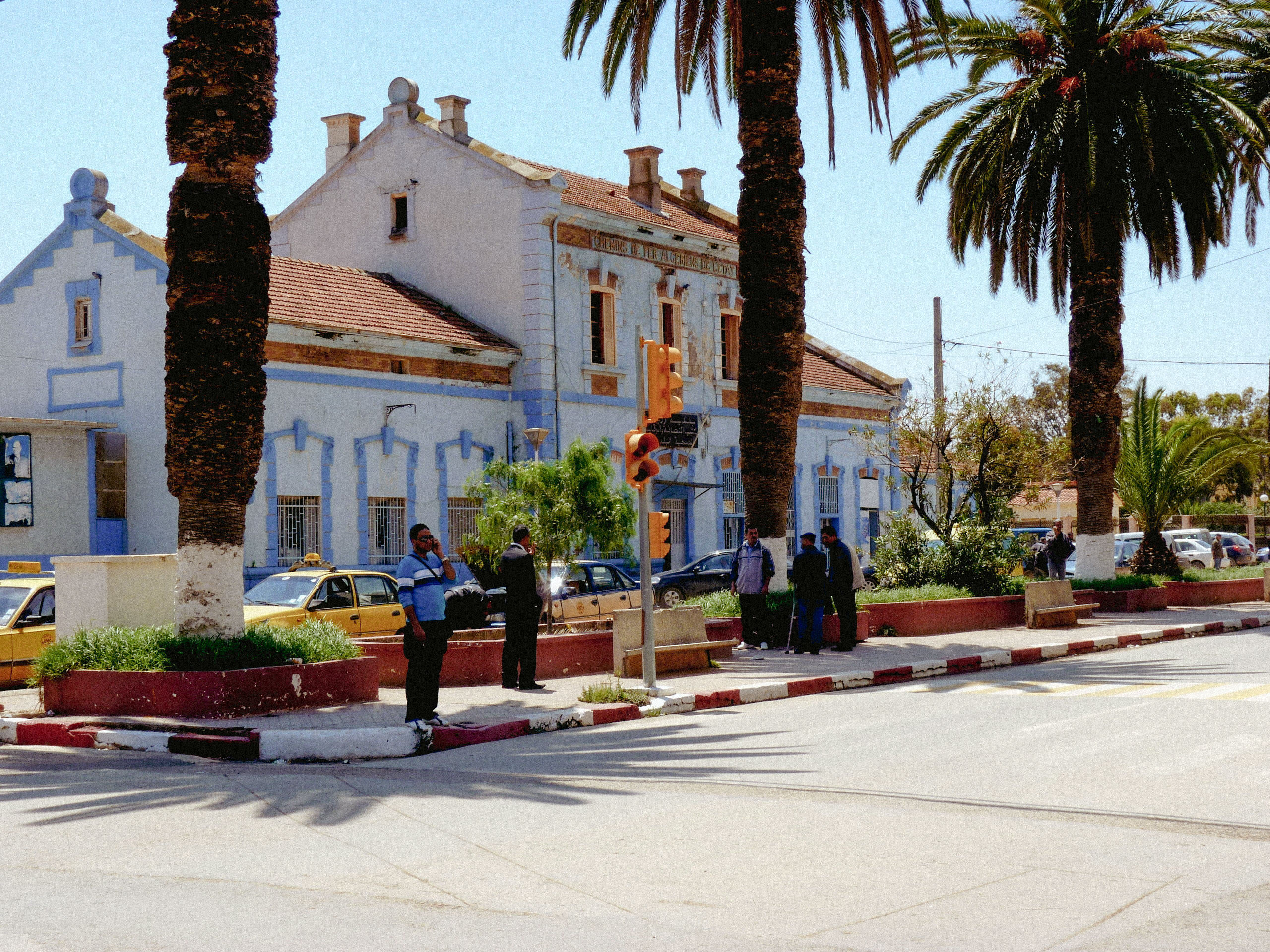
The station in Arzew in 2010.

- Souk Ahras – M'daourouch - Oued Kébérit - Ouenza (84 km): opened on February 10, 1922 (conversion from narrow gauge to standard gauge),
- Oulmène - La Meskiana (36 km): opened on July 15, 1925 (narrow gauge),
- La Meskiana – Tébessa (57.4 km): opened on October 15, 1925 (narrow gauge),
- Sidi Mabrouk (Constantine) – Oued Athmania (43 km): opened on September 1, 1931 (standard gauge),
- Souk Ahras – Oued Keberit (56.2 km): electrified in 1932;
- Guelma - Bouchegouf (51.9 km): (standard gauge),
- Bône – Bouchegouf (54.8 km): electrified in 1932, (standard gauge),
- Akid Abbes – Ghazaouet (54.6 km): opened on March 9, 1936, (standard gauge),
- Oued Kébérit – Ouenza (27.8 km): electrified in 1938, (standard gauge).

== Rolling Stock ==
=== Steam Locomotives ===
- Nos. 371 to 380, type 230, delivered in 1910 by Fives-Lille, narrow gauge;
- Nos. 401 to 415, type 241, delivered in 1921 by Schneider at Le Creusot, standard gauge;
- Nos. 451 to 460, type 140, delivered in 1908 by Fives-Lille, narrow gauge;
- Nos. 461 to 472, type 140, delivered in 1924 by Schneider at Le Creusot, narrow gauge;
- Nos. 473 to 475, type 140, delivered in 1924 by Schneider at Le Creusot, narrow gauge;
- Nos. 476 to 478, type 140, delivered in 1924 by SACM in Belfort, narrow gauge;
- Nos. 479 to 485, type 140, delivered in 1925 by SACM in Belfort, narrow gauge;
- Nos. 486 to 495, type 140, delivered in 1929 by Schneider at Le Creusot, standard gauge;
- Nos. 501 to 520, type 150, delivered in 1920 by Schneider at Le Creusot, standard gauge;
- Nos. 541 to 550, type 150, delivered in 1921 by Schneider at Le Creusot, standard gauge;
- Nos. 571 to 585, type 150, delivered in 1928 by Société Franco-Belge, standard gauge;
- Nos. 586 to 600, type 150, delivered in 1929 by Société Franco-Belge, standard gauge;
- Nos. 651 to 656, type 150, delivered in 1927 by Société Franco-Belge, narrow gauge;
Steam Locomotives

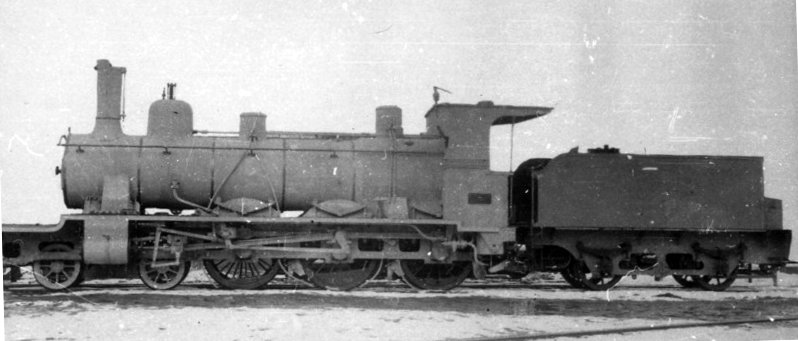
Type 230 Locomotive, Series 371 to 380.

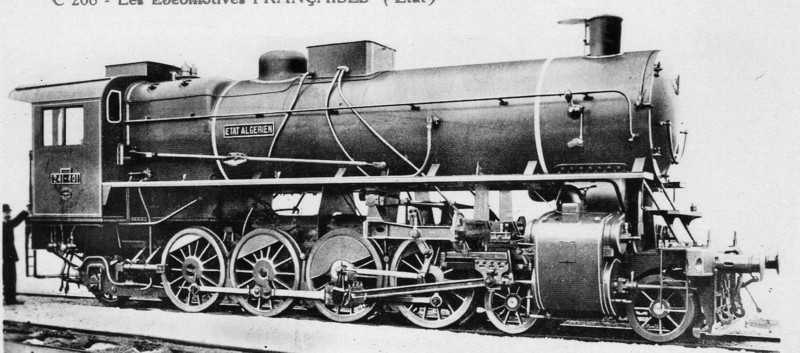
Type 241 Locomotive, Series 401 to 415.

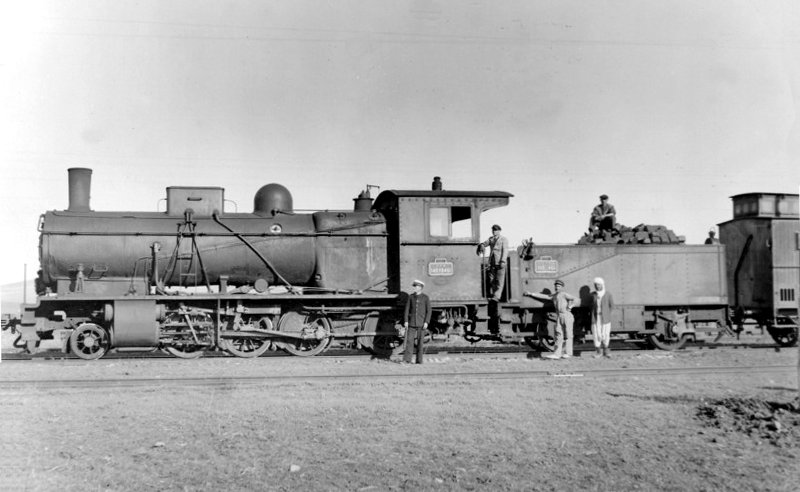
Type 140 Locomotive, Series 451 to 460.

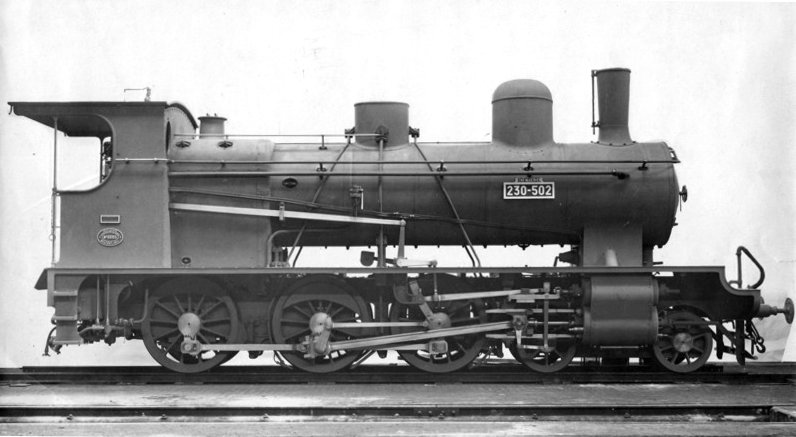
Type 230 Locomotive, Series 501 to 520.

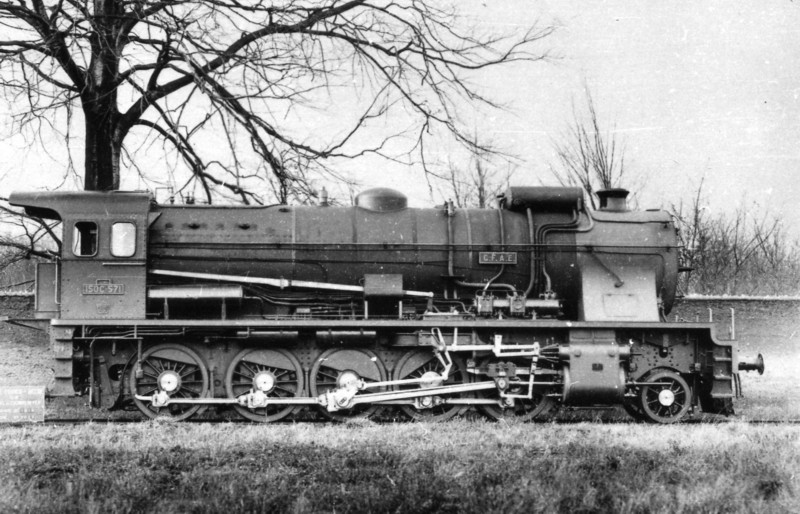
Type 150 Locomotive, Series 571 to 585.

=== Electric Locomotives ===
- 6 AE 1001 to 1030, Co'Co' type, delivered in 1932 by Alsthom, standard gauge
- 4 AE 1 and 2, Bo'Bo type, delivered in 1947 by Jeumont, standard gauge
- 6 BE 1 to 8, Co'Co' type, derived from the CC 7100, delivered in 1958 by Alsthom.
Electric Locomotives

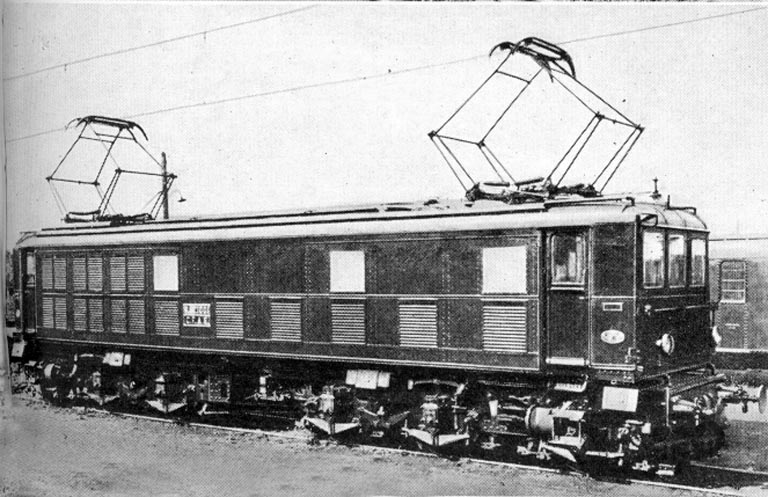
Series 6 AE.

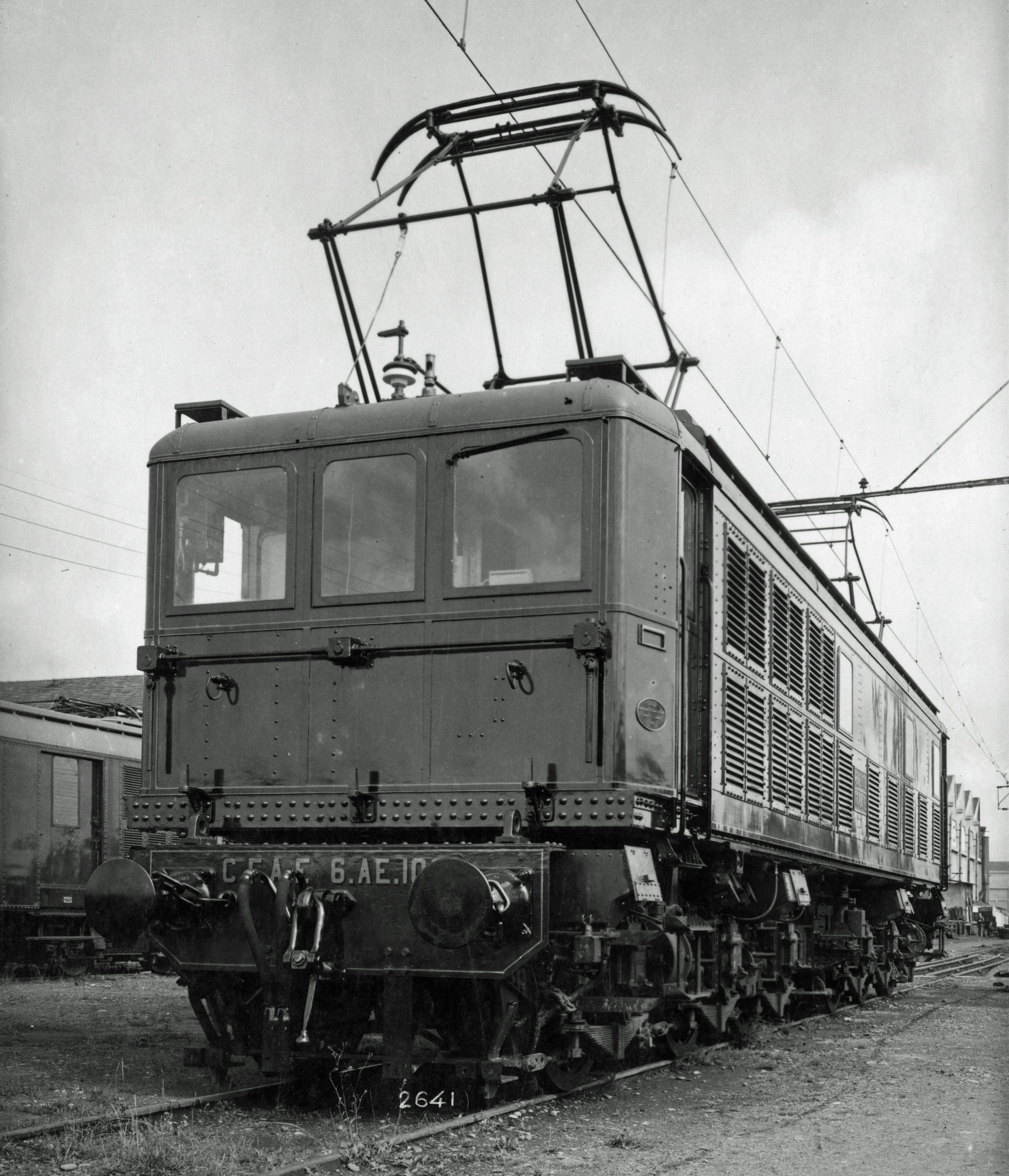
Front view.

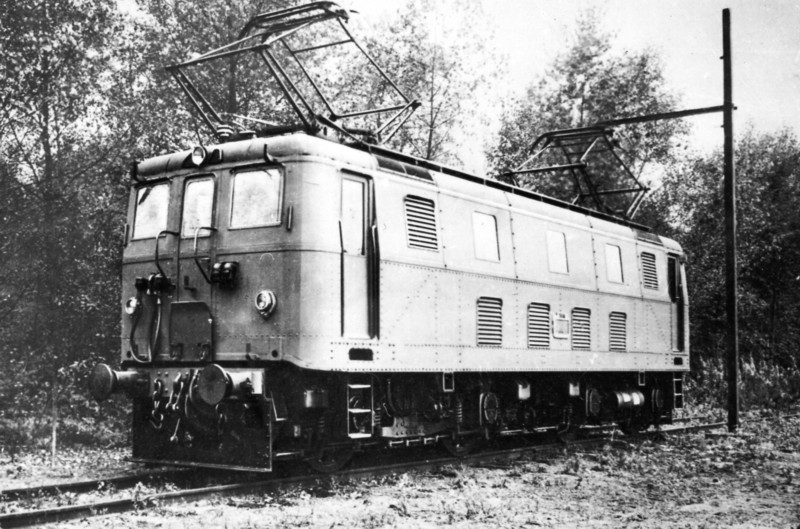
Series 4 AE.
