= Bir Bouhouche District =

Bir Bouhouche District دائرة بئر بوحـوش
- District
- Map of Algeria highlighting Souk Ahras Province
- Country: Algeria
- Province: Souk Ahras
- District seat: Bir Bouhouche

Population (1998)
  - Total: 11,888
- Time zone: UTC+01 (CET)
- Municipalities: 3

Bir Bouhouche is a district in Souk Ahras Province, Algeria. It was named after its capital, Bir Bouhouche.

== Municipalities ==
The district is further divided into 3 municipalities:

1. Bir Bouhouche
2. Zouabi
3. Safel El Ouiden
