= Société de l'Ouenza =

Algerian iron mining company

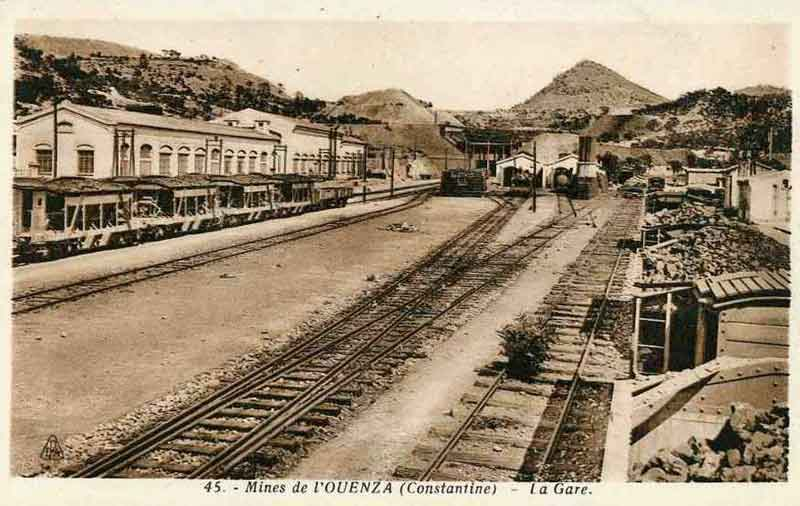
- Ouenza Station
- Industry: Mining
- Founded: 1913 in Ouenza, Tebessa Province, Algeria
- Defunct: 1966
- Fate: Nationalized

The Société de l'Ouenza was an Algerian iron ore mining company founded in 1913 and nationalized in 1966. It exploited rich deposits of high-quality ore at two sites in northeast Algeria near the Tunisian border. The ore was sent by rail to the port of Bône, then shipped to refineries in the UK, Europe and North America. At its peak it employed 4,000 workers who were housed in company towns.

== Ore deposits ==
Djebel Ouenza and Djebel Bou Khadra are isolated massifs near the border between Algeria and Tunisia, Their peaks are from 1,200 to 1,400 metres (3,900 to 4,600 ft) high. Since ancient times it has been known that the limestone formations contain large seams of iron ore. The iron ore was rediscovered in recent times by a prospector named Wetterlé who had migrated to Algeria after his home province of Alsace-Lorraine became part of Germany in 1871. He was looking for copper, a much more precious metal, and had little interest in the mountain of iron ore he stumbled upon.

The Djebel Ouenza deposit, 120 kilometres (75 mi) southeast of Bône (now Annaba), extends for more than 5 kilometres (3.1 mi) from northeast to southeast, with over 100 million tons of red hematite formed by metasomatism. Iron concentration ranges from 50% to 60%, and there is about 2% manganese. The ore outcrops are suitable for open pit mining. Djebel Bou-Khadra is 11 kilometres (6.8 mi) west of Morsott and 30 kilometres (19 mi) south of Djebel Ouenza. It has similar origins, structure and composition, and extends for over 1 kilometre (0.62 mi) with at least 23 million tons of ore. The low-phosphorus ore from both deposits is excellent quality, with 54% iron on average.

== Early disputes ==
Locations in Algeria

Rising iron ore prices at the start of the 20th century caused interest in exploiting the Ouenza deposits. The prospector F. R. Pascal obtained a concession to mine underground deposits of copper and iron at Ouenza in 1903. (The iron was thrown in as an afterthought.) Pascal did not have the resources to develop the concession, which he ceded through an intermediary to Eugène Schneider of Le Creusot. Schneider 's main competitor was the Rotterdam-based company of W. H. Muller and Co. Muller was mainly involved in shipping, and supplied ore to the German steel producers up the Rhine including Krupp. In 1902 Pascal revoked his agreement with Schneider and ceded it to Muller, who created the Société concessionnaire des Mines de l'Ouenza in 1903. Schneider then applied for a lease for the minière, or exploitation of the above-ground outcropping, which he was granted in 1903, and formed the Société d'Études de l'Ouenza, owned 2/3 by Schneider and other French steelmakers, and 1/3 by British, Belgian and German steelmakers – including Krupp. The two rival companies thus had superimposed concessions.

There then ensued an argument over the railway to carry the iron ore to the coast. The existing narrow-gauge Bône-Tébessa line did not have the capacity to carry the ore from Ouenza in addition to phosphates from Tébessa region. The shortest distance and easiest terrain for a new line would be from Ouenza to Nebeur in Tunisia, which was connected by rail to the port of Bizerte. Ships supplying coal to the French naval base there could carry the ore on the return journey. On the other hand, Bône was nearer to Ouenza and there would no need to expand the capacity of its port. The deciding factor was that Bône was in Algeria, and a purely Algerian (French) route was favored by the premier Georges Clemenceau and other leading politicians. The government proposed a law to let Schneider build the railway to Bône, but ran into opposition from various sources including socialists and syndicalists. In March 1909 the government withdrew the proposed Bône railway law, and immediately there were howls of protest from Algeria. In the end, the initial concessions expired on 10 April 1913 before any work had started.

== Concessions ==
The Société de l'Ouenza was created in 1913 with capital of 114 million francs to exploit the Ouenza iron deposits. Under the convention of 16 October 1913 the Société de l'Ouenza had the right to exploit both surface and sub-surface deposits at Djebel Ouenza until completely exhausted, with a minimum annual rate of extraction of 750,000 tons of ore, in return for royalties to the state of 1 franc per ton plus 50% of profits and payment to the railway of 6 francs per ton for transport to Bône. The articles of the Société de l'Ouenza as a Société Anonyme were approved in January 1914, and the company was granted the full concession on 28 March 1914.

A lead and zinc mining concession at Bou-Khadra was granted in 1903 to the Société Mokta El Hadid. This expired unused on 1 April 1913. New requests for the concession were presented in 1917, but due to the upheavals of World War I 1914–18) nothing was done. The opening of a standard gauge railway from Oued Keberit to Souk Ahras and availability of more powerful tractors made the Bou-Khadra deposit more attractive in 1920. Both the Société Mokta El Hadid and the Société de l'Ouenza asked for the concession. The Société de l'Ouenza made the better offer and on 29 August 1925 was granted the concession, including iron ore, lead and zinc. Similar royalty terms applied to the Djebel Bou-Khadra deposits.

== Facilities ==
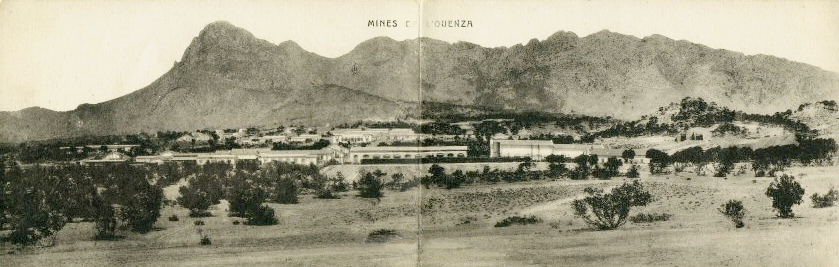
Mines at Ouenza c. 1950

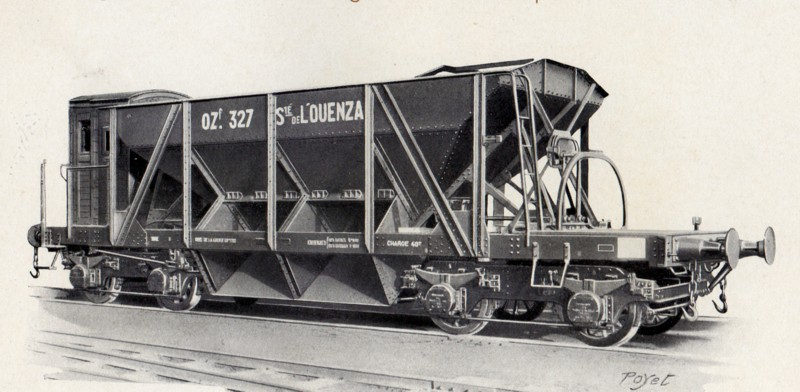
One of the company's ore wagons

At both mines the ore was mostly extracted through open pit mining, and only occasionally through underground galleries. The ore was extracted using pneumatic hammers. It was hauled up to the railroad by electrical machinery using power supplied by the Bourbonnais Power Station at Bône. In the port of Bône the company had a 400 metres (1,300 ft) quay and room to store 450,000 tons of ore. The ore was dumped into a hopper from which it was loaded into ships by three identical conveyors, each able to handle 600 tons per hour. Production grew to 1,000,000 tons in 1930.

At peak operation there were 400 Europeans working as managers and technicians and 3,500 Muslim workers. There were 20 armed guards at the Ouenza mine. The workforce was recruited from the local people and from migrants from El Oued, Petite Kabylie and Morocco. During World War II the company employed 230 Italian prisoners of war. In 1943 all the unskilled workers were Muslims. They worked an 8-hour day and received a salary, family allowances and attendance bonuses. Managers and office workers had different salaries for 40-hour and 48-hour work weeks.

At both mines the company built small towns with workers' housing, shops, offices and schools. In Ouenza there was a modern medical center, bank, hotel and post office. Water was supplied from D'hala. Both Europeans and Muslims were lodged and given access to electricity and water. A school with six classes taught 200 pupils. The medical center had a chief medical officer and an assistant doctor, a midwife and nurses. There were Catholic and Protestant pastors, and a mosque for the Muslims. The cinema played films twice a week. There was a sports field, two tennis courts, two Moorish cafes and a cafe-hotel.

== History ==
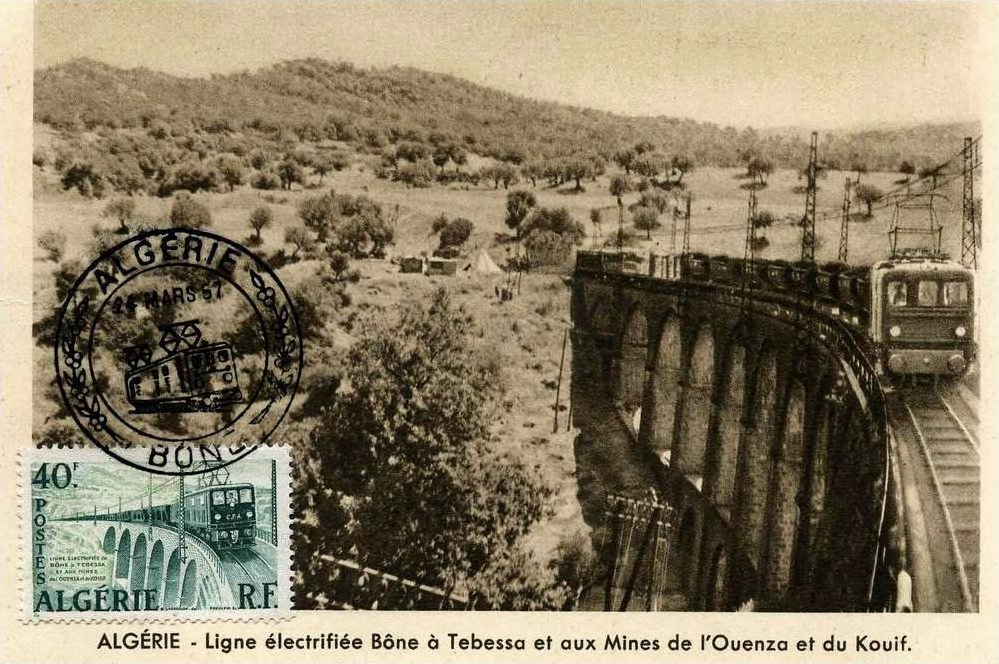
The electrified line from Bône to Ouenza

The government took over the Bône-Guelma line and widened it from Souk Ahras to the Ouenza and onward to Tebessa. A 24 kilometres (15 mi) narrow-gauge railway from the Djebel Ouenza mine to the Algerian railway network at Oued Keberit station was opened in March 1921 and mining began. Production reached 225,000 tons in 1922. A branch railway line from Bou Khadra to Ain Chenia was opened in early 1929 and mining operations began at Bou Khadra. The Société de l'Ouenza overtook the Société Mokta El Hadid as the largest mining company in Algeria in 1927.

The Great Depression forced the Société de l'Ouenza in 1932 to ask for a delay in payments to the Algerian government. Production fell to under 207,000 tons in 1932 and the operation at Bou-Khadra was suspended. The state took a greater share in the company and assigned two administrators designated by the governor general. Output began to rise again to 1,000,000 tons or more annually, but as the economic crisis continued the company asked for further revision of the concession terms, and a new agreement was made on 28 April 1937. A combined minimum of 1,350,000 tons was to be extracted from the two mines, with revisions to the taxes and transport charges.

As of 1 January 1938 all concessionary distinctions between the two mines were eliminated. The government share increased to almost 28% of capital, and the government was represented by three directors. Further adjustments to taxes, royalties, transport fees and shareholding were made in the years that followed. Output peaked at 1,866,000 tons in 1938. In the prewar period 50% of output went to England, 28% to Germany and only 7.5% to France. Other customers included Belgium, Italy, Poland, the US and Canada.

During World War II (1939–45) production fell to 175,000 tons in 1941 and 198,000 tons in 1942. The Bône port facilities were badly damaged by bombing in November 1942, but it proved possible to build a conveyor from the debris that could load 1,000 tons per hour. Shipments stopped in 1943. In 1944 production was 500,000 tons, in 1945 it was 900,000 tons and in 1946 it was 1,225,000 tons. By 1946 the company employed 2,000 people. In 1949 the Société de l'Ouenza was one of 20 French companies with capitalization over 5 billion francs. At 7.7 billion it ranked 10th. In 1951 the Société de l'Ouenza produced 60% of Algerian iron, 85% in Ouenza and 15% in Bou-Kadra. That year 2,140,000 tons of ore were produced and 2,057,000 tones were exported. By this time the company was 66% state-owned.

Algeria became independent in 1962. The company continued to operate, and in 1963 re-registered in Algeria and declared that it was an Algerian company with headquarters in Algeria. The company was nationalized by ordinances of 6 May 1966 and 14 July 1966 and the BAREM company was appointed administrator. An ordinance of 11 May 1967 transferred the assets, rights and liabilities of BAREM to the Société Nationale de Recherches et d'Exploitation Minières (SONAREM). Later there was a dispute where the former board of directors of the company claimed some sums owed to it by French, Italian and English companies. This was successfully disputed by SONAREM on the grounds that only it could represent the nationalized company.

== Sources ==
- Baldacci, Aimé (27 February 2007), "Histoire de la La Mine de l'Ouenza et de Boukhadra", Histoire de ouenza (in French)
- Clozier, R. (1950), "Les sociétés milliardaires en France", L'Information Géographique (in French), 14 (2)
- Dupont, Maurice (August–September 1952), "Les intérêts français contre l'intérêt de la France en Afrique du Nord", Esprit (in French), 193/194 (8/9), Editions Esprit, JSTOR 24253081
- Lauterpacht, E. (1970), International Law Reports, Cambridge University Press, ISBN 978-0-521-46386-7
- Lebert, André (June 2001), "Les mines de fer de l'Ouenza et de Bou-Khadra", l'Algérianiste (in French) (94), archived from the original on 2013-10-22
- Prochaska, David (2002), Making Algeria French: Colonialism in Bône, 1870–1920, Cambridge University Press, ISBN 978-0-521-53128-3
