= Pontilia gens =

Ancient Roman family

The gens Pontilia was an obscure plebeian family at ancient Rome. Hardly any members of this gens appear in history, but a number of them are mentioned in inscriptions.

== Origin ==
The nomen Pontilius belongs to a class of gentilicia which were originally derived from cognomina ending in -ilus. However, such names were so common that the ending -ilius came to be regarded as a regular gentile-forming suffix, and was applied in cases where there was no morphological justification. This may have been the case with Pontilius, which is probably derived from the Oscan praenomen Pompo or Pomptus, which also gave rise to several other nomina, including Pompilius, Pomponius, and Pontius. Pompo was the Oscan cognate of the Latin praenomen Quintus, and thus Pontilius was equivalent to Latin gentes such as Quinctia and Quinctilia.

== Praenomina ==
The chief praenomina of the Pontilii were Gaius, Marcus, Lucius, and Numerius. The first three were the most common praenomina throughout Roman history, while Numerius was mainly used by plebeian families, especially those of Oscan origin. Other praenomina are occasionally found, with instances of Publius, Sextus, and Titus, all of which were very common.

== Members ==
This list includes abbreviated praenomina. For an explanation of this practice, see filiation.

- Pontilia, buried at Rome.
- Pontilius, named in an inscription from Carthage in Africa Proconsularis.
- Pontilius M. f., son of Marcus Pontilius Urbanus and Fortunata, buried at Atina in Lucania, in a tomb dating to the third century AD, or the latter part of the second.
- Gaius Pontilius, mentioned by Appian one of the allied leaders during the Social War, may be a mistake for "Gaius Pontidius", which is what he is called by Velleius Paterculus.
- Gaius Pontilius, one of the masters of Philippus, a slave mentioned in an inscription from Carthago Nova in Hispania Citerior.
- Gaius Pontilius, named in an inscription from the present site of Mechta 'Ain el Msad, formerly part of Numidia.
- Marcus Pontilius, one of the masters of Philippus.
- Marcus Pontilius, named in an inscription from Aquileia in Venetia and Histria.
- Numerius Pontilius, buried at Atina.
- Gaius Pontilius Bantius, named in a libationary inscription from Thignica in Africa Proconsularis.
- Pontilius Caedimnus, a friend of Gnaeus Julius Maturus, a quattuorvir buried at Hipponium in Bruttium, during the second or third centuries AD.
- Numerius Pontilius Campanus, buried at Atina, in a tomb dedicated by his children.
- Marcus Pontilius Cerealis, named in an inscription from Rome.
- Gaius Pontilius Coronarius, named in a libationary inscription from Thignica.
- Pontilius Crescens, buried at Ausafa in Africa Proconsularis, aged fifty-eight.
- Pontilia Crispina, wife of Tiberius Parmensius Tacitus, and mother of Parmensia Tacitae, buried with her daughter at Parma in Etruria.
- Lucius Pontilius L. f. Durus, a standard-bearer, named in an inscription from Caere in Etruria.
- Lucius Pontilius Epidius, one of the masters of Philodamus, a slave, named in an inscription from Minturnae.
- Marcus Pontilius Epidius, one of the masters of Philodamus.
- Publius Pontillius Eros, named in an inscription from Rome.
- Pontilia Festa, buried at the present site of Sidi Mohammed el Azreg, formerly part of Africa Proconsularis, aged fifty-five.
- Pontilius Fortunatus, buried at Thagura in Africa Proconsularis.
- Gaius Pontilius Fregellanus, an administrative decurion at Salona in Dalmatia.
- Pontilius Nundinarius, named in a libationary inscription from Thignica.
- Pontilia Renata, dedicated a tomb at Atina, dating to the third century AD, to her husband, Aurelius Quintasius, aged forty-five.
- Publius Pontilius Saturninus, buried at the present site of Marakib, formerly part of Africa Proconsularis.
- Pontilia Secunda, daughter of Pontilius Victorinus, buried at Madaurus in Numidia, aged twenty-nine years, ten months, and twenty-four days.
- Marcus Pontilius Urbanus, husband of Fortunata, buried a son at Atina.
- Titus Pontilius Venal[...], named in an inscription from Pausulae in Picenum.
- Pontilius Victorinus, father of Pontilia Secunda.
- Sextus Pontilius Vindex, aedile and quattuorvir, buried at the present site of Rouzou, formerly in Africa Proconsularis.
- Caecilius Pontilius Paulinus, a flamen and patron of the Roman colony at Madaurus.

== See also ==
- List of Roman gentes

== Bibliography ==
- Marcus Velleius Paterculus, Compendium of Roman History.
- Appianus Alexandrinus (Appian), Bellum Civile (The Civil War).
- Dictionary of Greek and Roman Biography and Mythology, William Smith, ed., Little, Brown and Company, Boston (1849).
- Theodor Mommsen et alii, Corpus Inscriptionum Latinarum (The Body of Latin Inscriptions, abbreviated CIL), Berlin-Brandenburgische Akademie der Wissenschaften (1853–present).
- Gustav Wilmanns, Inscriptiones Africae Latinae (Latin Inscriptions from Africa, abbreviated ILAfr), Georg Reimer, Berlin (1881).
- Ettore Pais, Corporis Inscriptionum Latinarum Supplementa Italica (Italian Supplement to the Corpus Inscriptionum Latinarum), Rome (1884).
- René Cagnat et alii, L'Année épigraphique (The Year in Epigraphy, abbreviated AE), Presses Universitaires de France (1888–present).
- George Davis Chase, "The Origin of Roman Praenomina", in Harvard Studies in Classical Philology, vol. VIII (1897).
- Stéphane Gsell, Inscriptions Latines de L'Algérie (Latin Inscriptions from Algeria, abbreviated ILAlg), Edouard Champion, Paris (1922–present).
- Inscriptiones Italiae (Inscriptions from Italy, abbreviated InscrIt), Rome (1931-present).
