= Heddada District =

Haddada District دائرة الحدادة
- District
- Map of Heddada District in Souk Ahras Province
- Country: Algeria
- Province: Souk Ahras
- District seat: Haddada

Population (1998)
  - Total: 19,487
- Time zone: UTC+01 (CET)
- Municipalities: 3

Haddada is a district in Souk Ahras Province, Algeria. It was named after its capital, Haddada.

== Municipalities ==
The district is further divided into 3 municipalities:

- Haddada
- Khedara
- Ouled Moumen
