= Haddada =

Haddada may refer to,

== Algeria ==
- Haddada District, part of Souk Ahras Province, Algeria
- Haddada, Algeria, a town or commune located in Haddada District
- Haddada, Boumerdès, a village located in Thenia District

== Morocco ==
- Haddada, Morocco
