= Aïn Soltane =

Aïn Soltane may refer to:

In Tunisia:

- Aïn Soltane, Tunisia

In Algeria:

- Aïn Soltane, Aïn Defla, a municipality or commune in Aïn Defla Province
- Aïn Soltane, Souk Ahras, a municipality or commune in Souk Ahras Province
- Aïn Soltane, Saïda, a municipality or commune in Saïda Province
- Aïn Soltane, Bordj Bou Arréridj, a municipality or commune in Bordj Bou Arréridj Province
