= Mechroha District =

Mechroha District دائرة المشروحة
- District
- Map of Algeria highlighting Souk Ahras Province
- Country: Algeria
- Province: Souk Ahras
- District seat: Mechroha

Population (1998)
  - Total: 33,316
- Time zone: UTC+01 (CET)
- Municipalities: 2

Mechroha is a district in Souk Ahras Province, Algeria. It was named after its capital, Mechroha.

== Municipalities ==
The district is further divided into 2 municipalities:

- Mechroha
- Hannencha
