= Sedrata District =

Sedrata District دائرة سدراتة
- District
- Map of Algeria highlighting Souk Ahras Province
- Country: Algeria
- Province: Souk Ahras
- District seat: Sedrata

Population (1998)
  - Total: 54,182
- Time zone: UTC+01 (CET)
- Municipalities: 3

Sedrata (Berber: Isedraten) is a district in Souk Ahras Province, Algeria. It was named after its capital, Sedrata.

== Municipalities ==
The district is further divided into 3 municipalities:

- Sedrata
- Khemissa
- Aïn Soltane
