= Ouled Driss District =

Coordinates: 36.3500°N 8.0167°E

Ouled Driss District دائرة أولاد إدريـس
- District
- Map of Algeria highlighting Souk Ahras Province
- Country: Algeria
- Province: Souk Ahras
- District seat: Ouled Driss

Population (1998)
  - Total: 19,408
- Time zone: UTC+01 (CET)
- Municipalities: 2

Ouled Driss is a district in Souk Ahras Province, Algeria. It was named after its capital, Ouled Driss.

== Municipalities ==
The district is further divided into 2 municipalities:

- Ouled Driss
- Ain Zana
