= Titurnia gens =

Ancient Roman family

The gens Titurnia was an obscure plebeian family at ancient Rome. Few members of this gens are mentioned in history, but others are known from inscriptions.

== Praenomina ==
The main praenomina of the Titurnii were Gaius, Marcus, and Lucius, the three most common names at all periods of Roman history. Other praenomina found in this family include Quintus, Titus, and Decimus, of which Quintus and Titus were common, while Decimus was more distinctive.

== Branches and cognomina ==
Several of the earlier Titurnii came from towns in Venetia and Histria, but the great majority of inscriptions from this family show that they settled in Roman Africa at an early date, prospering there until at least the second or third century.

== Members ==
This list includes abbreviated praenomina. For an explanation of this practice, see filiation.

- Marcus Titurnius Rufus, the last member of a family with whom Cicero had long been warmly acquainted. In 46 BC, the orator earnestly recommended him to Manius Acilius Glabrio.
- Marcus Titurnius M. f. Africanus, in 2 BC rebuilt the temple of Tellus at Vaga in Africa Proconsularis.
- Gaius Titurnius C. l. Florus, a freedman who dedicated a tomb at Altinum in Venetia and Histria during the first half of the first century for his patron, the freedman Gaius Titurnius Gratus.
- Gaius Titurnius C. l. Gratus, a freedman buried at Altinum during the first half of the first century, with a monument from his client, the freedman Gaius Titurnius Florus.
- Gaius Titurnius C. l. Senecio, a freedman buried at Aquileia in Venetia and Histria during the latter half of the first century, in a sepulchre built by the freedman Jucundus.
- Gaius Titinius Quartio, an eques in the Legio III Gallica, probably during Trajan's Parthian campaign of AD 115, since his inscription mentions trophies won at Seleucia and Babylon. After serving for thirty-five years, Quartio was buried at the site of modern Naimine er Rodoui, formerly part of Africa Proconsularis.
- Titurnia Extricoi, buried in a second-century tomb at Castellum Celtianum in Numidia, aged eighty.
- Titurnia Januaria, buried in a second-century tomb at Castellum Celtianum, aged forty-five.
- Titurnia Rogata, buried in a second-century tomb at Castellum Celtianum, aged forty.
- Titurnia Silvana, buried in a second-century tomb at Castellum Celtianum, aged ninety-five.
- Titurnius Postumus, the former master of Titurnia Artemonis, who made a second- or third-century offering in his honour to Diana at Segobriga in Hispania Citerior.
- Titurnia Artemonis, a freedwoman, made an offering to Diana at Segobriga, dating between the beginning of the second and the late third century, in honour of Titurnius Postumus, her former master.
- Titurnius Rogatus, a soldier in the first cohort of the vigiles at Rome in AD 205. He served in the century of Victor.
- Titurnia, buried in a second- or third-century tomb at Castellum Celtianum.
- Gaius Titurnius Villanus, buried in a second- or third-century tomb at Castellum Celtianum, aged forty-one.

=== Undated Titurnii ===
- Titurnia, buried at Lambaesis in Numidia, aged sixty, with a monument from her husband, Gaius Sextius Bassus.
- Titurnius, made an offering to Saturn at Calama in Africa Proconsularis.
- Titurnius, dedicated a tomb at Ammaedara in Africa Proconsularis for his father, Gaius Titurnius Felix.
- Decimus Titurnius D. T. l. Diphilus, a freedman named in an inscription from Tarraco in Hispania Citerior.
- Titurnia Fausta, buried at the site of modern Ouled Sellam, formerly part of Africa Proconsularis, aged thirty.
- Gaius Titurnius C. f. Felix, buried at Ammaedara in Africa Proconsularis, aged sixty-two, with a monument from his son, Titurnius.
- Lucius Titurnius L. f. Felix, buried at Uchi Maius in Africa Proconsularis, aged sixty-five.
- Quintus Titurnius Fortunatus, named in an inscription from the site of modern Chettaba, formerly part of Numidia.
- Lucius Titurnius Januarius, buried at Civitas Popthensis in Numidia, aged forty-one.
- Titurnia Maximina, wife of the priest Gaius Terebellius Paternus, with whom she made an offering at Cuicul in Numidia in honour of their children, Terebellius Nestor and Grania.
- Titurnia Marcia, buried at Respublica Vahartanensium in Mauretania Caesariensis, aged sixty.
- Titurnia Monula, buried at Castellum Phuensium in Numidia. The portion of the inscription giving her age is damaged, but she was at least twenty.
- Titurnia Nina, buried at Vasampus in Africa Proconsularis, aged one hundred and fifteen, with a monument from her son, Rogatus Felix Messor.
- Titurnia L. f. Quintilla, buried at Milevum in Numidia, aged twenty-five.
- Titurnia Rogata, a young woman buried at Castellum Celtianum, aged eighteen.
- Quintus Titurnius Saturninus, made an offering at Thignica in Africa Proconsularis.
- Gaius Titurnius Verus, dedicated a tomb at Aquileia for the freedwoman Vettia Sabina, aged twenty-six, perhaps his mother.
- Titurnius Vitalis, buried at Zugal in Numidia, aged eighty.

== See also ==
- List of Roman gentes

== Bibliography ==
- Marcus Tullius Cicero, Epistulae ad Familiares.
- Dictionary of Greek and Roman Biography and Mythology, William Smith, ed., Little, Brown and Company, Boston (1849).
- Theodor Mommsen et alii, Corpus Inscriptionum Latinarum (The Body of Latin Inscriptions, abbreviated CIL), Berlin-Brandenburgische Akademie der Wissenschaften (1853–present).
- René Cagnat et alii, L'Année épigraphique (The Year in Epigraphy, abbreviated AE), Presses Universitaires de France (1888–present).
- Stéphane Gsell, Inscriptions Latines de L'Algérie (Latin Inscriptions from Algeria), Edouard Champion, Paris (1922–present).
- Epigraphica, Rivista Italiana di Epigrafia (1939–present).
- Alfred Merlin, Inscriptions Latines de La Tunisie (Latin Inscriptions from Tunisia), Fondation Dourlans, Paris (1944).
