= Sedrata, Souk Ahras =

Algerian municipality

Sedrata / Isedraten سدراتة
- Commune and town
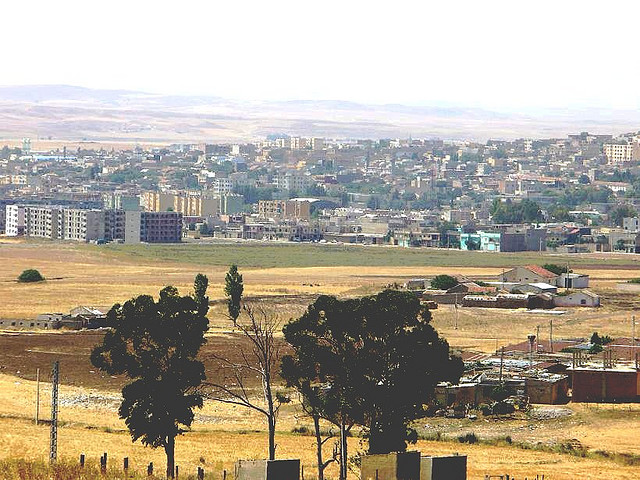

- Location within Algeria
- Coordinates: 36°07′42″N 7°31′53″E
- Country: Algeria
- Province: Souk Ahras Province
- District: Sedrata District

Population (2019)
  - Total: 110.213
- Time zone: UTC+1 (CET)

Sedrata (Berber: Isedraten, Arabic: سدراتة) is a municipality and large city in Souk Ahras Province, Algeria, capital of Sedrata District. It has a population of 110.213 as of the 2019 census, which gives it 11 seats in the PMA. Its municipal code is 4102 and postal code is 41200. It is located in the north east of the country, close to the border with Tunisia. It is situated to the west of Souk Ahras. There are four high schools in Sedrata, one of which is a technical school. There is also a centre of formation for jobs for pupils who dropped out of middle school. Sedrata accommodates one of the important paper factories in the east, as well as other factories.

== Climate ==
Sedrata has a hot-summer Mediterranean climate (Köppen: (Csa).

Climate data for Sedrata
Month	Jan	Feb	Mar	Apr	May	Jun	Jul	Aug	Sep	Oct	Nov	Dec	Year
Daily mean °C (°F)	5.4 (41.7)	6.5 (43.7)	8.8 (47.8)	11.7 (53.1)	16.0 (60.8)	20.1 (68.2)	24.1 (75.4)	24.2 (75.6)	21.3 (70.3)	15.4 (59.7)	10.6 (51.1)	6.5 (43.7)	14.2 (57.6)
Average precipitation mm (inches)	74 (2.9)	63 (2.5)	56 (2.2)	45 (1.8)	50 (2.0)	21 (0.8)	9 (0.4)	11 (0.4)	32 (1.3)	42 (1.7)	55 (2.2)	66 (2.6)	524 (20.8)
Source: Climate-Data.org
