= Titedia gens =

Ancient Roman family

The gens Titedia, also written as Titidia, or Titiedia, was an obscure plebeian family at ancient Rome. Hardly any members of this gens are mentioned by Roman writers, and only one, Titidius Labeo, held any of the higher magistracies of the Roman state; others are known from inscriptions.

== Origin ==
The nomen Titedius belongs to a class of gentilicia formed using the suffix -idius to form nomina from cognomina ending in -idus. It resembles, and may be derived from the same root as the Titia gens.

== Praenomina ==
The main praenomina of the Titedii were Lucius and Gaius, which happen to be the two most common praenomina at all periods of Roman history. A few of the Titedii bore other names, including Gnaeus and Quintus.

== Members ==
This list includes abbreviated praenomina. For an explanation of this practice, see filiation.

- Titidia, the daughter of Titulus, made an offering, perhaps to Diana, at Marruvium in Samnium, dating from the late second or early first century BC.
- Lucius Titedius L. l. Martialis, a freedman, dedicated a tomb at Supinum Vicus in Samnium, dating from the late first century BC or early first century AD, for his collibertus, (Note: Someone freed on the same occasion as Primigenius.) Lucius Titedius Primigenius.
- Lucius Titedius L. l. Primigenius, a freedman buried at Supinum Vicus, in a tomb built by his collibertus Lucius Titedius Martialis, in the late first century BC, or early first century AD.
- Gaius Titedius, the master of Jucundus, a slave buried at Casinum in Latium in AD 6.
- Titidius Labeo, (Note: Titedius in some manuscripts of Pliny; Titidius in Tacitus. A former reading was Ateius.) praetor and governor of Gallia Narbonensis during the reign of Tiberius. In AD 19, his wife, Vistilia, was accused of prostituting herself. Labeo was reluctant to take action, but under pressure from the aediles, he agreed to exile her to the island of Seriphos in the Cyclades. Labeo lived to an advanced age, and was fond of painting small subjects, although his contemporaries found his hobby unbecoming in a man of his rank.
- Titedius C. l. Philumena, a freedwoman buried at Iguvium in Umbria during the first half of the first century.
- Titidia Ɔ. l. Salvia, a freedwoman who built a sepulchre at Paestum in Lucania, dating from the early or middle first century, for herself and the freedwoman Titidia Sura.
- Gnaeus Titidius, the former master of Titidia Sura.
- Titidia Cn. l. Sura, a freedwoman named in a sepulchral inscription from Paestum, dating from the early or middle first century, from a tomb built by the freedwoman Titidia Salvia.
- Gaius Titedius Moderatus, named in a first-century bronze inscription from Matrice in Hispania Citerior.
- Gaius Titedius Tyrannus, dedicated a first-century tomb at Vicus Fificulanus for his wife, Titedia Prima.
- Titedia Ɔ. l. Prima, a freedwoman buried in a first-century tomb built by Gaius Titedius Tyrannus, Vicus Fificulanus.
- Gaius Titedius, one of the municipal quattuorviri at Aquinum in Latium in AD 74.
- Titedia Venusta, the wife of Optatus, and mother of Asteris, a young woman buried at Rome, aged seventeen years, three months, and eleven days, between the middle of the first century and the end of the second.
- Lucius Titedius Valentinus, one of the Seviri Augustales, and the husband of Titedia Venusta, was the father of Titedia Fucentia and Lucius Titedius Valentinus, buried at Alba Fucens in Samnium during the first half of the second century.
- Titedia Venusta, the wife of Lucius Titedius Valentinus, and mother of Titedia Venusta and Lucius Titedia Valentinus, a young man buried at Alba Fucens during the first half of the second century.
- Titedia L. f. Fucentia, the daughter of Lucius Titedius Valentinus and Titedia Venusta, and brother of Lucius Titedius Venustus, a young man buried at Alba Fucens during the first half of the second century.
- Lucius Titedius L. f. Valentinus, a young man buried at Alba Fucens, aged twenty-two, with a monument from his parents, Lucius Titedius Valentinus and Titedia Venusta. His sister was Titedia Fucentia.
- Titedia Apicula, honored by a second-century inscription from Velitrae in Latium, dedicated by her son, Colpus, and niece, Themis.
- Titiedius Augurius, a youth buried at Alba Fucens, aged fourteen years, eleven months, and eight days, in a second-century tomb built by Quintus Gargilius.
- Titiedius Flaccus, a military tribune in the Legio X Gemina, and one of the quattuorviri, buried in a second-century tomb at Carsioli in Samnium.
- Titidius Maximus, a centurion in the fourth cohort of the Legio II Traiana Fortis, stationed at Nicopolis in Egypt in AD 157.
- Titiedia Faustina, named in a dedicatory inscription from Alba Fucens, dating from AD 168.
- Lucius Titedius L. f. Proculinus, the father of Lucius Titedius Proculus, and at least one other child, who dedicated a statue in their memory at Tusculum in AD 196.
- Lucius Titedius L. f. L. n. Proculus, the son of Lucius Titedius Proculinus, with whom he was honoured with a statue placed by a sibling at Tusculum in AD 196.
- Lucius Titiedius Flaccus Petronianus, named in a sepulchral inscription from Rome, dating from the latter half of the third century.
- Lucius Titiedius L. f. Flaccus, a little boy buried at Rome, aged four years and four days, in a tomb dating from the latter half of the third century. He might be the same person as Lucius Titiedius Petronianus, named earlier in the same inscription.
- Titidia Felicitas, buried at Rome, aged seventy, in a tomb built by her sons, Petronius Proclus and Petronius Proclianus, dating from the first half of the fourth century.

== Undated Titidii ==
- Lucius Titiedius, named in an inscription from Carsioli.
- Titedius Agathopus, buried at Rome in a tomb built by Titedia Felicula, either his mother or his wife.
- Lucius Titiedius Alcimus, a potter whose maker's mark was found on pottery from Sicily.
- Titedia Felicula, built a tomb at Rome for her husband and son, one of whom was Titedius Agathopus.
- Lucius Titedius Fortunatianus, buried at Rome, aged thirty-five years, two months, six days, and thirteen hours, in a tomb built by his wife, Titedia Memmia, and kinsman, Titedius Titianus.
- Gaius Titedius Fuscus, buried at Lambaesis in Numidia.
- Lucius Titidius L. f. Maximus, buried in a family sepulchre at Parentium in Venetia and Histria, built by his mother, the freedwoman Septimia Myrtis, for herself, her son, and her husband, Lucius Titidius Olympus.
- Titedia Memmia, the wife of Lucius Titedius Fortunatianus, for whom she built a tomb at Rome, along with her husband's kinsman, Titedius Titianus.
- Lucius Titidius Olympus, buried at Parentium, in a family sepulchre built by his wife, the freedwoman Septimia Myrtis, for herself, her husband, and their son, Lucius Titidius Maximus.
- Lucius Titiedius L. l. Philodamus, a freedman named along with several other freedmen from various gentes in a sepulchral inscription from Rome.
- Titiedia Plias, buried at Rome, in a tomb dedicated by her husband, Titius Valerianus.
- Titedius Potamus, named in an inscription from Narbo in Gallia Narbonensis.
- Quintus Titedius Q. f. Secundus, buried at Civitas Popthensis in Numidia, aged sixty-eight.
- Titedius Titianus, a kinsman of Lucius Titedius Fortunatianus, for whom he built a tomb at Rome, along with Fortunatianus' wife, Titedia Memmia.
- Titiedia L. l. Venusta, a freedwoman buried at Firmum Picenum, in a tomb built by her husband, Allidius Claudius.

== See also ==
- List of Roman gentes

== Bibliography ==
- Gaius Plinius Secundus (Pliny the Elder), Historia Naturalis (Natural History).
- Publius Cornelius Tacitus, Annales.
- Dictionary of Greek and Roman Biography and Mythology, William Smith, ed., Little, Brown and Company, Boston (1849).
- Theodor Mommsen et alii, Corpus Inscriptionum Latinarum (The Body of Latin Inscriptions, abbreviated CIL), Berlin-Brandenburgische Akademie der Wissenschaften (1853–present).
- Giovanni Battista de Rossi, Inscriptiones Christianae Urbis Romanae Septimo Saeculo Antiquiores (Christian Inscriptions from Rome of the First Seven Centuries, abbreviated ICUR), Vatican Library, Rome (1857–1861, 1888).
- Bulletin Archéologique du Comité des Travaux Historiques et Scientifiques (Archaeological Bulletin of the Committee on Historic and Scientific Works, abbreviated BCTH), Imprimerie Nationale, Paris (1885–1973).
- René Cagnat et alii, L'Année épigraphique (The Year in Epigraphy, abbreviated AE), Presses Universitaires de France (1888–present).
- Paul von Rohden, Elimar Klebs, & Hermann Dessau, Prosopographia Imperii Romani (The Prosopography of the Roman Empire, abbreviated PIR), Berlin (1898).
- Stéphane Gsell, Inscriptions Latines de L'Algérie (Latin Inscriptions from Algeria), Edouard Champion, Paris (1922–present).
- Antonio Ferrua, Antiche Inscrizione Inedite di Roma (Unedited Ancient Inscriptions from Rome, 1939–1980).
