= Bled El Hadba mine =

Phosphate mine in Algeria

Coordinates: 34°39′28.6″N 8°9′58.3″E

- Interactive map of Bled El Hadba mine
- Location: Tébessa Province, Algeria
- Products: Phosphates

The Bled El Hadba mine is a large mine located in Tébessa Province. Bled El Hadba represents one of the largest phosphates reserve in Algeria having estimated reserves of 800 million tonnes of ore grading 15% P_{2}O_{5}.

== History ==
The 16th November 2024 was inaugurated by the Algerian-Chinese Fertilizers Company(ACFC), the beginning of the project that includes the development of a phosphate ore mine and phosphate production and processing complex in Oued Keberit (Souk Ahras). Together, these initiatives are part of Algeria's Integrated Phosphate Project.

The Algerian-Chinese company, named Algerian Chinese Fertilizers Company (ACFC), was created in March 2022 by the Algerian companies Asmidal and Manal, which owned the 56%, and the Chinese groups Wuhuan and Tian’an, which own the remaining 44% stake, for an investment of 7 billion dollars.

Key highlights include:

- Job Creation; These projects are expected to generate over 12,000 direct jobs for construction and operation and more than 24,000 indirect jobs in logistics and related industries.
- Resource Utilization*: The site at Bled El Hadba will extract raw phosphate, enriched to improve its quality, while Oued Keberit will process it into fertilizers like phosphoric acid and ammonium-based products. This process will also integrate natural gas for producing ammonia and urea.
- Economic Impact*: With estimated reserves of 1.2 billion tons of phosphate at Bled El Hadba, Algeria is positioned among the top 10 countries globally in phosphate resources. The project is seen as a cornerstone for enhancing food security and establishing Algeria as a key player in the global fertilizer market.
- Strategic Development; The project represents a fully Algerian effort, led by national companies Sonatrach and Sonarem, with an estimated investment of $1.5 billion. It also includes plans for export infrastructure to handle finished products.

These initiatives are a pivotal part of Algeria’s strategy to diversify its economy and reduce reliance on imports for agricultural products, while also boosting its export potential.

Production will begin in early 2027, according to the official agency.
