= Souk Ahras =

Souk Ahras Arabic: سوق أهراس Tamazight: ⵙⵓⵇ ⴰⵀⵔⴰⵙ
- City and commune
- City of Souk Ahras
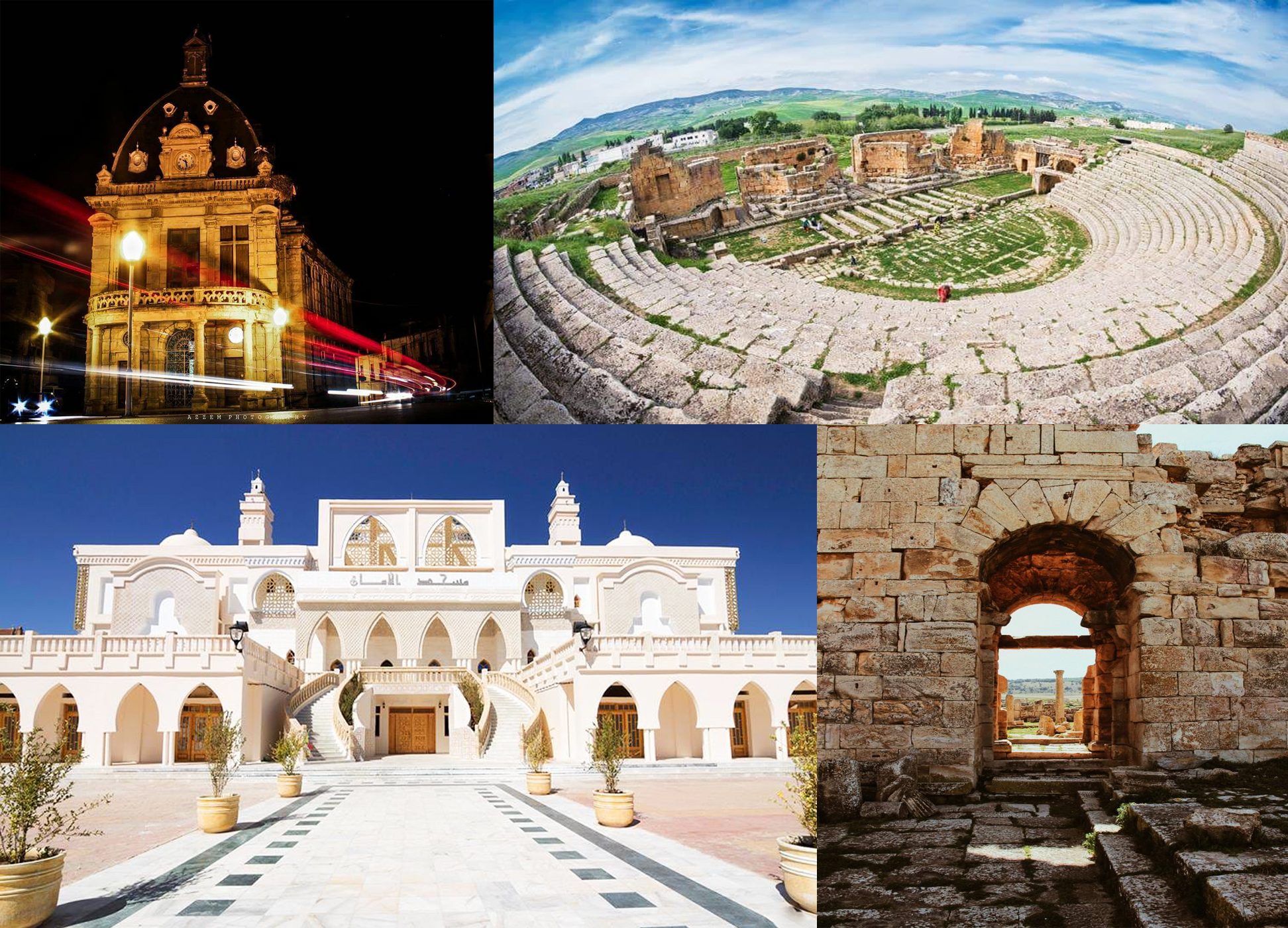
- View of the city

- Location of Souk Ahras within Algeria
- Coordinates: 36°17′11″N 7°57′4″E
- Country: Algeria
- Province: Souk Ahras (seat)
- District: Souk Ahras (coextensive)

Government
  - PMA Seats: 33

Area
  - Total: 812 km^{2} (314 sq mi)
- Elevation: 699 m (2,293 ft)

Population (2011)
  - Total: 156,745
  - Density: 193/km^{2} (500/sq mi)
- Demonym: Souk ahrasi
- Time zone: UTC+1 (CET)
- Postal code: 41000
- Area code: +213 (37)
- ONS code: 4101
- Climate: Csa
- Website: https://www.wilaya-soukahras.dz

Souk Ahras (Tamazight: ⵙⵓⵇ ⴰⵀⵔⴰⵙ, romanized: Ssuq Ahras, Arabic: سوق أهراس, romanized: Sūq Ahrās) is a municipality in Algeria. It is the capital of Souk Ahras Province. The Numidian city of Thagaste (or Tagaste), on whose ruins Souk Ahras was built, was the birthplace of Augustine of Hippo and a center of Berber culture.

== Etymology ==
The name derives from the Arabic word souk which means "market", and the Chaoui Berber word ahra (plural ahras) which means "lion", in reference to the Barbary lions which existed in the neighboring forests until their extinction in 1930; hence Souk Ahras means "market of lions" (see also Oran (Wahran) and Tahert for names with a related etymology).

The old name of the Numidian city of Thagaste derives from the Berber Thagoust, which means the bag, given that the site of the town is located at the foot of a mountain surrounded by three peaks in the form of a bag containing the city. Subsequently, when the Arabic language appeared in the region it was called Soukara. In other sources it is cited as the Palace of the African, according to Al-Masudi.

== History ==
=== Prehistory ===
The town of Souk Ahras, as its region, was home to people of the Aterian culture from the end of the Middle Palaeolithic to the early upper Palaeolithic Ages. After the Aterian, Souk Ahras was inhabited by people of the Capsian culture. Many stone tools dating to this period have been discovered. Stemmed arrows were found on the site of present-day Souk Ahras, but also in Tiffech and Taoura, not far from it.

=== Antiquity ===
It was the birthplace of Augustine of Hippo (born 13 November 354 CE), son of Saint Monica of Hippo, who later became the Bishop of Hippo and Saint Augustine. Souk Ahras (Thagaste) has played an important role in the political and cultural history of the region because of its strategic position at the crossroads of Numide, Ancient Roman, and Berber civilizations. It was the location of military fortifications (Madaure, Tiffech, Khemissa, etc.) and urban centers.

==== Thagaste ====
Thagaste was a town of Numidia in Roman North Africa, on the banks of the Oued Hamise river. Augustine of Hippo was born here. The Roman city is identified with ruins of Tajilt near Souk Ahras, Algeria.

The Numidian city of Thagaste or Tagaste, on whose ruins Souk Ahras was built, was situated in the north-eastern highlands of Numidia. It was about 100 km (60 miles) from Hippo Regius, (present day Annaba), 32 km (20 miles) southwest of Thubursicum (present day Khamissa), and about 240 km (150 miles) from Carthage (on the coast of present-day Tunisia).

Thagaste became a Roman municipium. The city was mentioned by Pliny the Elder. As a municipium, Thagaste was not settled by Roman Italian immigrants, but was inhabited by Romanized native Berbers.

=== Modern era ===
In 1830 Souk Ahras became a colonial settlement of French Algeria (1830–1962). In the late 19th century connection via the Algerian Railway, and in the 20th century iron ore and phosphate mining brought some modern significance and prosperity to the town.

During the Algerian War of Independence (1954–1962), Souk Ahras housed the Ouled Bechiah Mounts as an autonomous military base of the Army of National Liberation (ALN), called "Basis of the East".

== Geography ==
=== Relief and hydrography ===
The town of Souk Ahras is located in a basin surrounded by wooded mountains as the Djebel Beni Salah or Djebel Ouled Moumen.

Souk Ahras is crossed by a major North African river, the Medjerda.

Three dams exist in the region of Souk Ahras, that of Ain-Edalia supplies the town of Souk Ahras and its region with 76 million cubic metres (2.7 billion cubic feet). The dams of Oued Charef and Djedra, provide a capacity of 153 and 35 million cubic metres (5.4 and 1.2 billion cubic feet), respectively. Dam Djedra is intended to supply the town of Souk Ahras with a quantity of 12 and 35 million cubic metres (420 and 1,240 million cubic feet) of potable water, while 2 million cubic metres (71 million cubic feet) will be pumped for irrigation.

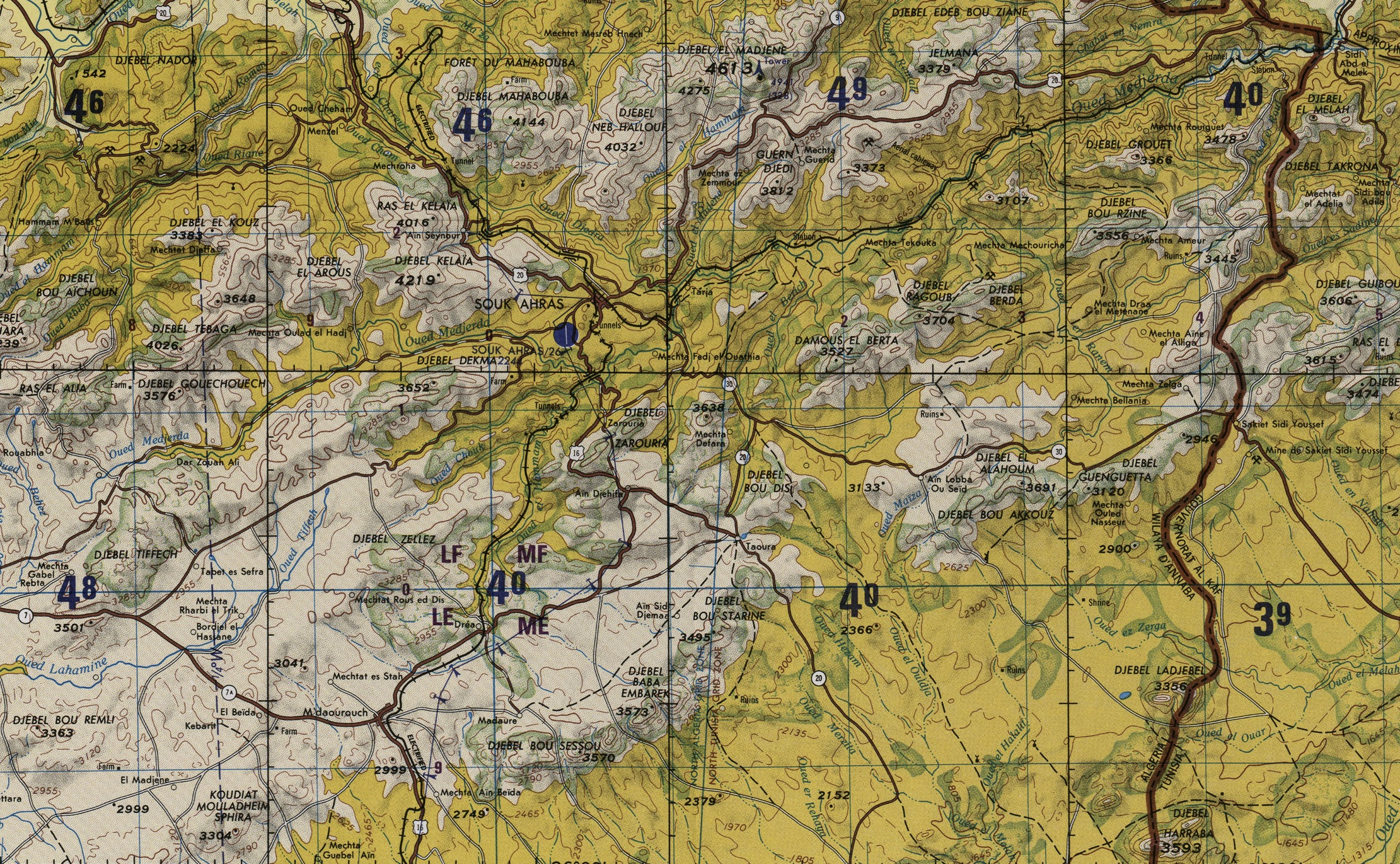
Souk Ahras topographic map

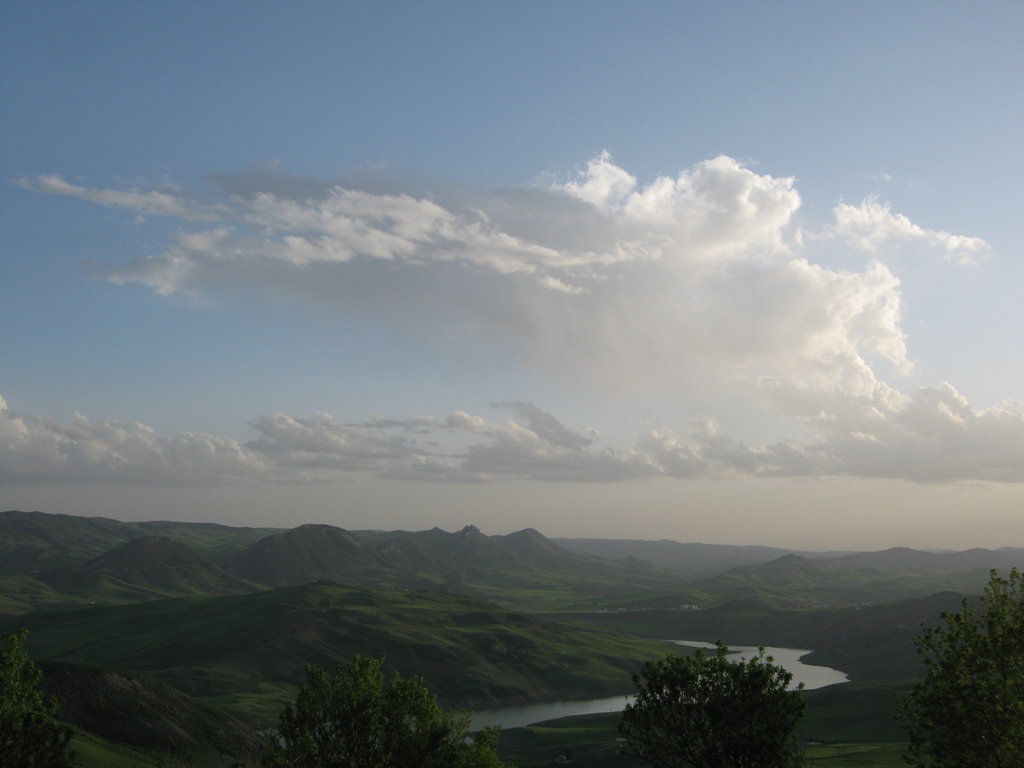
The Medjerda river

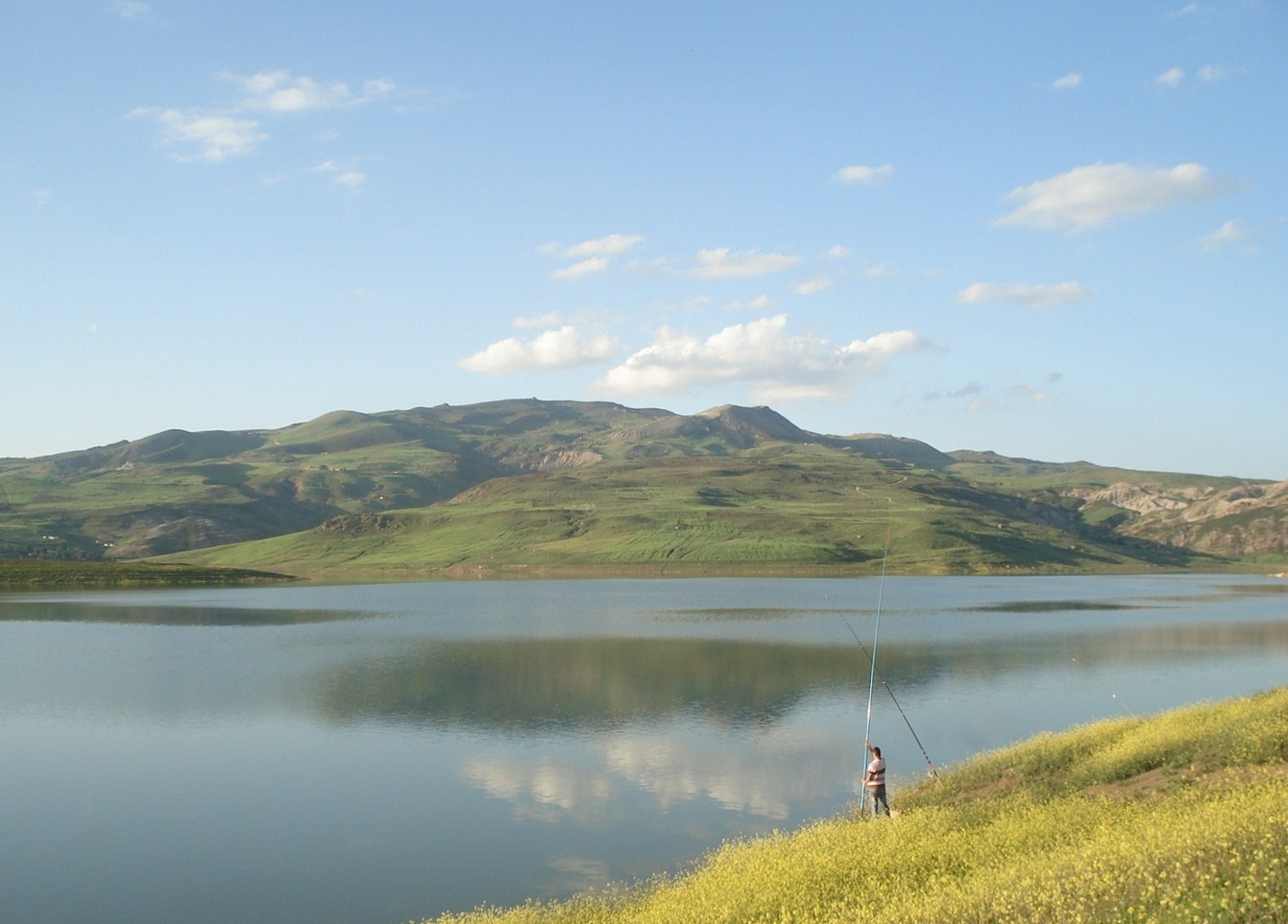
The Ain-dalia dam

=== Districts of Souk Ahras ===
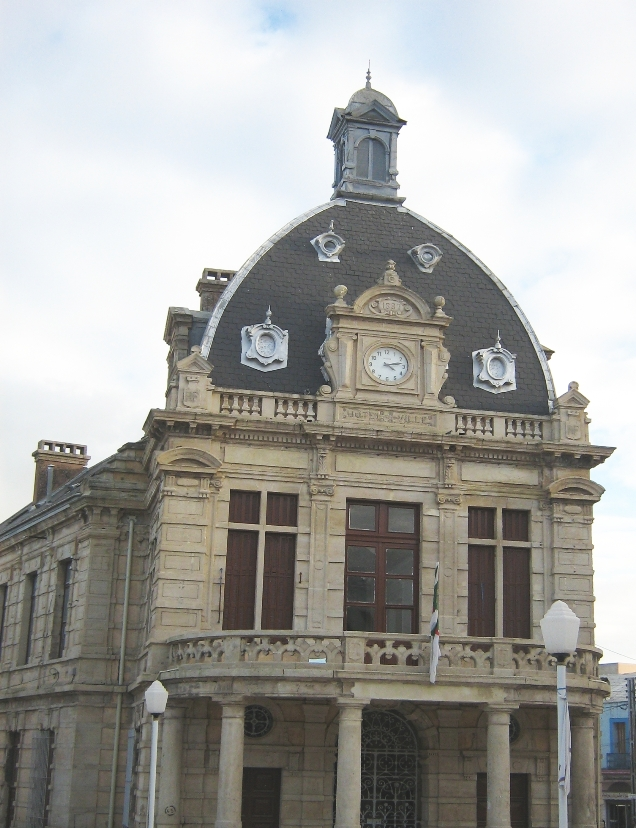
Former city hall of Souk Ahras, now used as a municipal theatre

- Souk Ahras
- Hamma-Loulou
- An-Nasser
- Diar Ezzarga
- 1er Novembre 1954
- 5 Juillet
- 17 Octobre
- 20 Août
- 26 Avril 1958
- El-Allaouia
- Ibn Rochd
- Kouicem Abdelhak
- Sidi Messaoud
- Sidi Okba
- Et-Tagtaguia

=== Climate ===
Souk Ahras has a hot-summer Mediterranean climate (Köppen climate classification Csa) with warm summers and mild winters. Its proximity to the Mediterranean Sea aids in moderating the city's temperatures. As a result, Souk Ahras usually does not see the extreme temperatures that are experienced in the adjacent interior deserts. The climate of Souk Ahras, like that of other Atlas cities, features wet winters and dry summers. Souk Ahras on average receives roughly 840.74 mm (33.10 inches) of precipitation per year, the bulk of which is seen between October and April.

Climate data for Souk Ahras (1991–2020)
| Month | Jan | Feb | Mar | Apr | May | Jun | Jul | Aug | Sep | Oct | Nov | Dec | Year |
|---|---|---|---|---|---|---|---|---|---|---|---|---|---|
| Record high °C (°F) | 24.5 (76.1) | 27.3 (81.1) | 30.6 (87.1) | 32.2 (90.0) | 37.9 (100.2) | 43.0 (109.4) | 43.7 (110.7) | 43.1 (109.6) | 43.0 (109.4) | 37.2 (99.0) | 29.0 (84.2) | 25.8 (78.4) | 43.7 (110.7) |
| Mean daily maximum °C (°F) | 11.6 (52.9) | — | 15.4 (59.7) | 18.6 (65.5) | 23.6 (74.5) | 29.3 (84.7) | 33.4 (92.1) | 33.4 (92.1) | 28.2 (82.8) | 23.5 (74.3) | 16.9 (62.4) | 12.7 (54.9) | — |
| Daily mean °C (°F) | 7.6 (45.7) | 7.9 (46.2) | 10.5 (50.9) | 13.2 (55.8) | 17.4 (63.3) | 22.4 (72.3) | 26.0 (78.8) | 26.3 (79.3) | 22.2 (72.0) | 18.0 (64.4) | 12.4 (54.3) | 8.8 (47.8) | 16.1 (61.0) |
| Mean daily minimum °C (°F) | 3.5 (38.3) | — | 5.6 (42.1) | 7.7 (45.9) | 11.2 (52.2) | 15.5 (59.9) | 18.7 (65.7) | 19.1 (66.4) | 16.1 (61.0) | 12.6 (54.7) | 8.0 (46.4) | 4.9 (40.8) | — |
| Record low °C (°F) | −5.7 (21.7) | −6.1 (21.0) | −1.5 (29.3) | −1.2 (29.8) | 2.1 (35.8) | 7.0 (44.6) | 9.5 (49.1) | 10.5 (50.9) | 7.6 (45.7) | 3.0 (37.4) | −0.5 (31.1) | −4.2 (24.4) | −6.1 (21.0) |
| Average precipitation mm (inches) | 118.2 (4.65) | 99.0 (3.90) | 85.3 (3.36) | 75.8 (2.98) | 60.2 (2.37) | 20.4 (0.80) | 7.0 (0.28) | 20.8 (0.82) | 42.8 (1.69) | 53.1 (2.09) | 82.0 (3.23) | 108.4 (4.27) | 773.0 (30.43) |
| Average precipitation days (≥ 1 mm) | 10.5 | 10.1 | 9.3 | 7.9 | 6.3 | 2.8 | 1.3 | 2.8 | 5.9 | 6.7 | 8.4 | 10.4 | 82.4 |
| Mean monthly sunshine hours | 153.2 | — | 208.4 | — | 277.9 | 311.0 | 348.7 | 318.4 | 239.5 | 221.6 | 169.5 | 142.6 | — |
Source: NOAA

== Demographics ==
The inhabitants of the town of Souk Ahras are of Berber origin. They are mainly from the different regions of the wilaya of Souk Ahras and neighboring wilayas. The first tribes having established in Souk Ahras were known as the Papiria, or Babiria from the name of Berber. They were composed of Causses and Syliactae.

The tribes of Mousoulami, Kirina, Hnanchas, Hrakta have also lived here, all of them having Berber origins. These tribes lived in tents and practiced nomadism. They have established later and founded respective cities for themselves, including the town of Souk Ahras.

Demographic evolution of Souk Ahras

| Year | Pop. | ±% |
|---|---|---|
| 1901 | 7,500 | — |
| 1926 | 10,600 | +41.3% |
| 1948 | 17,025 | +60.6% |
| 1954 | 20,700 | +21.6% |
| 1960 | 22,800 | +10.1% |
| 1966 | 34,400 | +50.9% |

| Year | Pop. | ±% |
|---|---|---|
| 1974 | 52,100 | +51.5% |
| 1977 | 57,173 | +9.7% |
| 1987 | 80,015 | +40.0% |
| 1998 | 115,882 | +44.8% |
| 2010 | 157,329 | +35.8% |

Source: World Gazzetter link, Recensement 1948 pdf

== Tourism ==
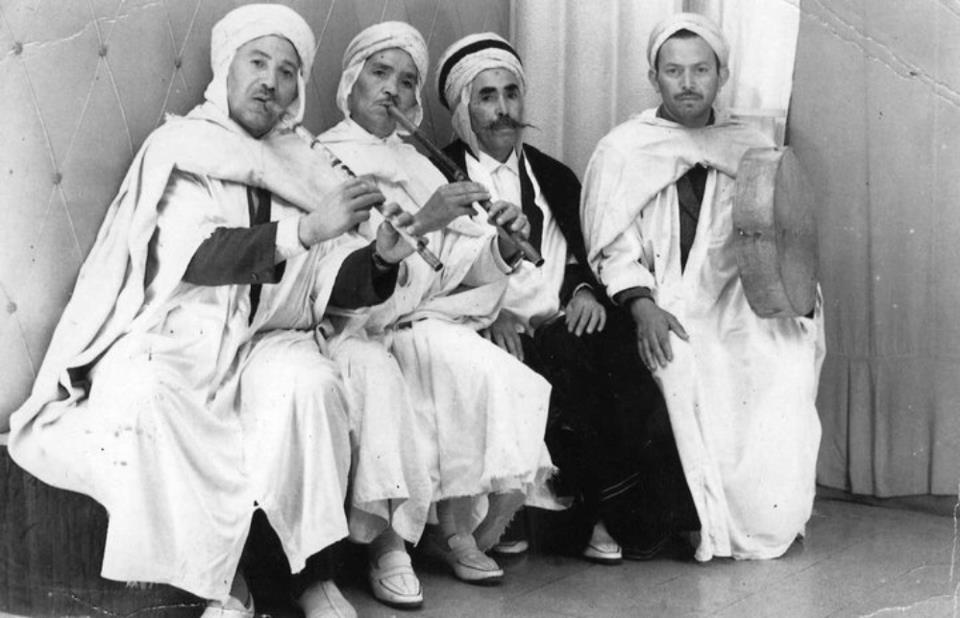
Cheikh Bourogaa, Algerian Folklorist 1950s to 1970s.

Tourism in Souk Ahras focuses largely on a variety of historical and natural sites. In recent years it has become a destination for culture and health tourism. Landmarks include the Al-Aman mosque, the Thagaste bridge in the center of the city, the olive tree of St. Augustine, the corner of Sidi Massoud, and the cultural center. It is located 90 km (56 miles) from Annaba and its airport.

== Related people ==
- Alypius of Thagaste, Christian bishop celebrated on August 15
- Apuleius, Hellenized Numidian author
- Saint Augustine of Hippo, Berber Christian author and Doctor of the Church
- Saïd Boualam, Algerian colonel in the French Army
- Chabane Boualleg, Algerian psychologist and senator
- Martianus Capella, Hellenized Roman author and Latin scholar
- Firmus and Rusticus, Christian martyrs of the 4th century
- Taoufik Makhloufi, middle-distance runner and gold medalist at the 2012 Summer Olympics
- Saint Monica, Berber Christian and mother of Augustine
- Charles Pellat, French scholar and historian
- Tacfarinas, Numidian Berber who resisted the Roman invasions
- Ahmad al-Tifashi, Algerian author
- Tahar Ouettar, Algerian author
- Kateb Yacine, Algerian author
- Antar Yahia, Algerian footballer
- Salim Halali, Algerian Jewish musician
- Warda Al-Jazairia, Algerian Singer

== Bibliography ==
- Nacéra Benseddik (2005). Thagaste. Souk Ahras, ville natale de saint Augustin. Algiers: Ed. Inas.
- Serge Lancel (2002). Saint Augustine, Hymns Ancient & Modern. Chapter I: Ltd. pp. 3–7.
- "The Martyrs of Madaura". Archived from the original on January 20, 2016.
