= Khemissa =

Khemissa خميسة
- Commune and town
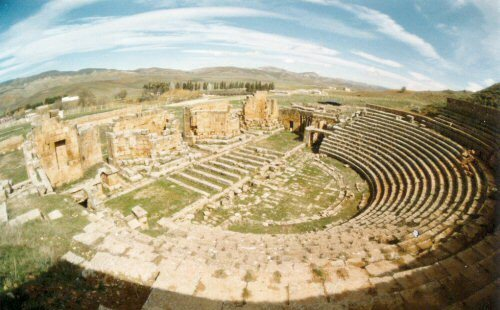
- Roman Theatre in Khemissa

- Location within Algeria
- Coordinates: 36°11′18″N 7°39′32″E
- Country: Algeria
- Province: Souk Ahras Province
- District: Sedrata District

Population (2008)
  - Total: 3,517
- Time zone: UTC+1 (CET)

Khemissa (Arabic: خميسة) is a town and commune in Souk Ahras Province in north-eastern Algeria. It is the location of Thubursicum Numidarum, a well-preserved Roman theater.
