= Madauros =

Ancient Roman-Berber city in Algeria

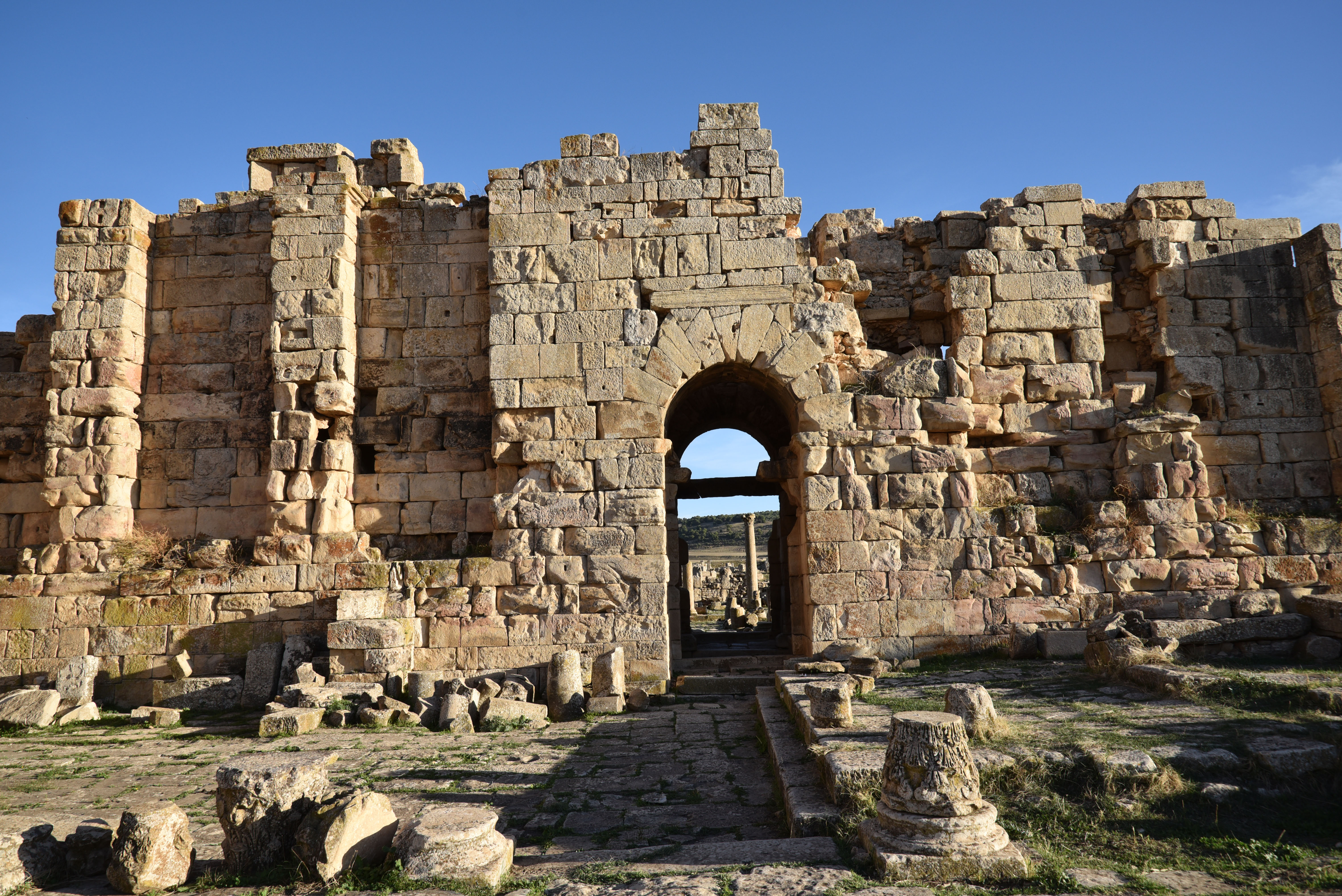
- Ruins of Madauros

- Location within Algeria
- 36.076667°N 7.82°E
- Location: Algeria
- Region: Souk Ahras Province

Madauros (Madaurus, Madaura) was a Roman-Berber city and a former diocese of the Catholic Church in the old state of Numidia, in present-day Algeria. It had one of the oldest universities, The University of Madaurus is often considered one of the earliest, if not the oldest, centers of higher learning in North Africa and the first in Africa, dating back to the Roman era (around 75 BC to 2nd century AD).

== History ==
The birth of the city dates back to the 5th century BC under the aegis of the Punics.

Madauros was made a Roman colony at the end of the first century and was famous for its "schola". A colony of veterans was established there; it was called Colonia Flavia Augusta Veteranorum Madaurensium under emperor Nerva.

The city was fully Romanised in the fourth century, with a population of Christian Berbers who spoke mainly African Romance, according to Theodor Mommsen.

Madauros was the see of a Christian diocese. There were three famous bishops of this diocese: Antigonus, who celebrated the 349 Council of Carthage; Placentius, who celebrated the 407 Council of Carthage and Conference of 411; and Pudentius, who was forced into exile alongside others present at the Synod of 484 because of the Vandal king Huneric.

The ruins of Madauros are close to the current city of M'Daourouch (Arabic: مداوروش) in present-day Algeria. It is possible to see:

- A Roman mausoleum with some statues.
- A Roman theatre, reduced in size because of a Byzantine fortification made in 535.
- Some small Roman thermae.
- A Roman basilica of the Byzantine era with three sections of columns.
- Some epitaphs, with Latin inscriptions.

== Notable residents ==
Apuleius, the author of the famous novel The Golden Ass, which is the only ancient Latin novel to survive in its entirety, was born in Madauros in the 120s. Lucius, the (fictional) protagonist of the novel, is also from Madauros. He was called the philosophus platonicus madaurensis which means the Madaurian Platonic philosopher.

Saint Augustine of Hippo studied in Madauros in the 4th century.

Maximus of Madauros was a grammarian of Berber origin from the late 4th century, known for his correspondence with Saint Augustine. He was also a teacher of Saint Augustine at the schools of Thagaste.

== See also ==
- Caesarea, Numidia
- Cirta
- Lambaesis
- Milevum

== Bibliography ==
- Gurney, Hudson The works of Apuleius Publisher Bell (University of California Libraries). London, 1878
- Gsell, Stephane. Histoire ancienne de l'Afrique du Nord en 8 tomes, Inscriptions de Madaure, ibid., p. CLXX-CLXXIV. Paris, 1922.
- Mommsen, Theodore. The Provinces of the Roman Empire. Barnes & Noble Ed. New York, 2005
