= Thubursicum =

Archaeological site

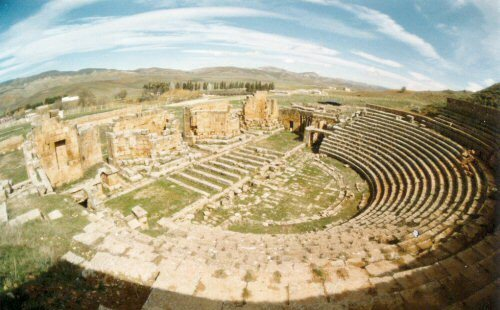
- Roman theatre in Thubursicum

- Location within Algeria
- 36.188611°N 7.659167°E
- Location: Algeria
- Region: Souk Ahras Province

Khamissa, ancient Thubursicum Numidarum or Thubursicum, is an Ancient Roman and Byzantine archaeological site, in Souk Ahras Province of northeastern Algeria.

== Geography ==
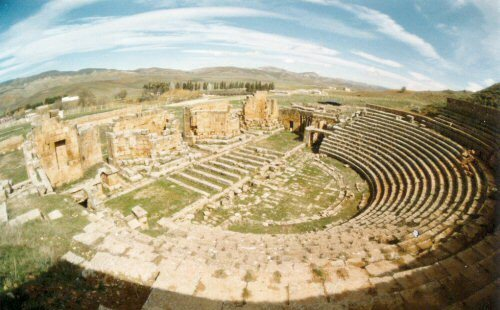
Ancient Roman theatre in Khamissa

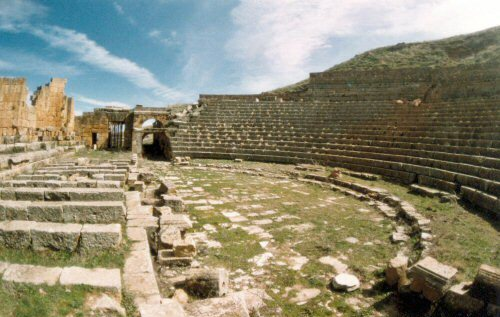
Thubursicum Numidarum theatre

Khamissa is located 40 kilometres (25 mi) southeast of Guelma, the coastal city known as Calama by ancient Roman settlers, and 32 kilometres (20 mi) northwest of Souk Ahras, known as Thagaste by ancient Berbers and Romans. It was around 250 kilometres (160 mi) west of ancient Carthage.

== History ==
Originally the site was a primary settlement of an indigenous Berber tribe of Numidia. This city is probably the town of which Tacitus speaks in connection with the revolt of Tacfarinas in the time of Tiberius (15 CE to 24 CE).

=== Roman era ===
Khamissa, then known as Thubursicum, was a Roman town in the Maghreb founded by the Emperor Trajan around 100 CE, when he elevated it to a municipium (Municipium Ulpium Traianum Augustum Thubursicu). Its inhabitants enrolled in the Papiria tribe.

It became a colonia (Roman colony) by 270 CE.

Khamissa became the seat of a bishopric, with a rectangular basilica having walls covered with marble constructed in the 2nd century. It was visited by Augustine of Hippo (St. Augustine) twice. He served as priest, coadjutor Bishop, and Bishop in regionally local Hippo Regius from 391 to 430.

=== Byzantine era ===
The town became part of the Vandalic Kingdom of Carthage from 435 to 534. It was reconquered in the Vandalic War by the East Roman Empire (Byzantine Empire) in 534, who built a Byzantine style chapel and small forts. It remained in the Byzantine Praetorian prefecture of Africa and Exarchate of Africa until the Muslim conquest of the Maghreb in 698.

== Archaeological site ==
Khamissa has a well preserved Roman theatre (built 2nd or 3rd century), considered one of the most beautiful and best-preserved in North Africa. Other Roman and Byzantine structures and ruins remain also.

Archaeological excavations, conducted from 1900 to 1922, cleared only one part of the town site. Most of the objects collected then, notably the Ancient Roman statues, are in Guelma at the Guelma Museum, Algeria.

== See also ==
- North Africa during Antiquity
- Synod of Hippo
- List of cultural assets of Algeria
