= Safel El Ouiden =

Coordinates: 35°55′45″N 7°29′25″E

- Commune and town
- Country: Algeria
- Province: Souk Ahras Province
- Time zone: UTC+1 (CET)

Safel El Ouiden is a town and commune in Souk Ahras Province in north-eastern Algeria.
