= Aïn Soltane, Tunisia =

Aïn Soltane عَيْن سُلْطَان
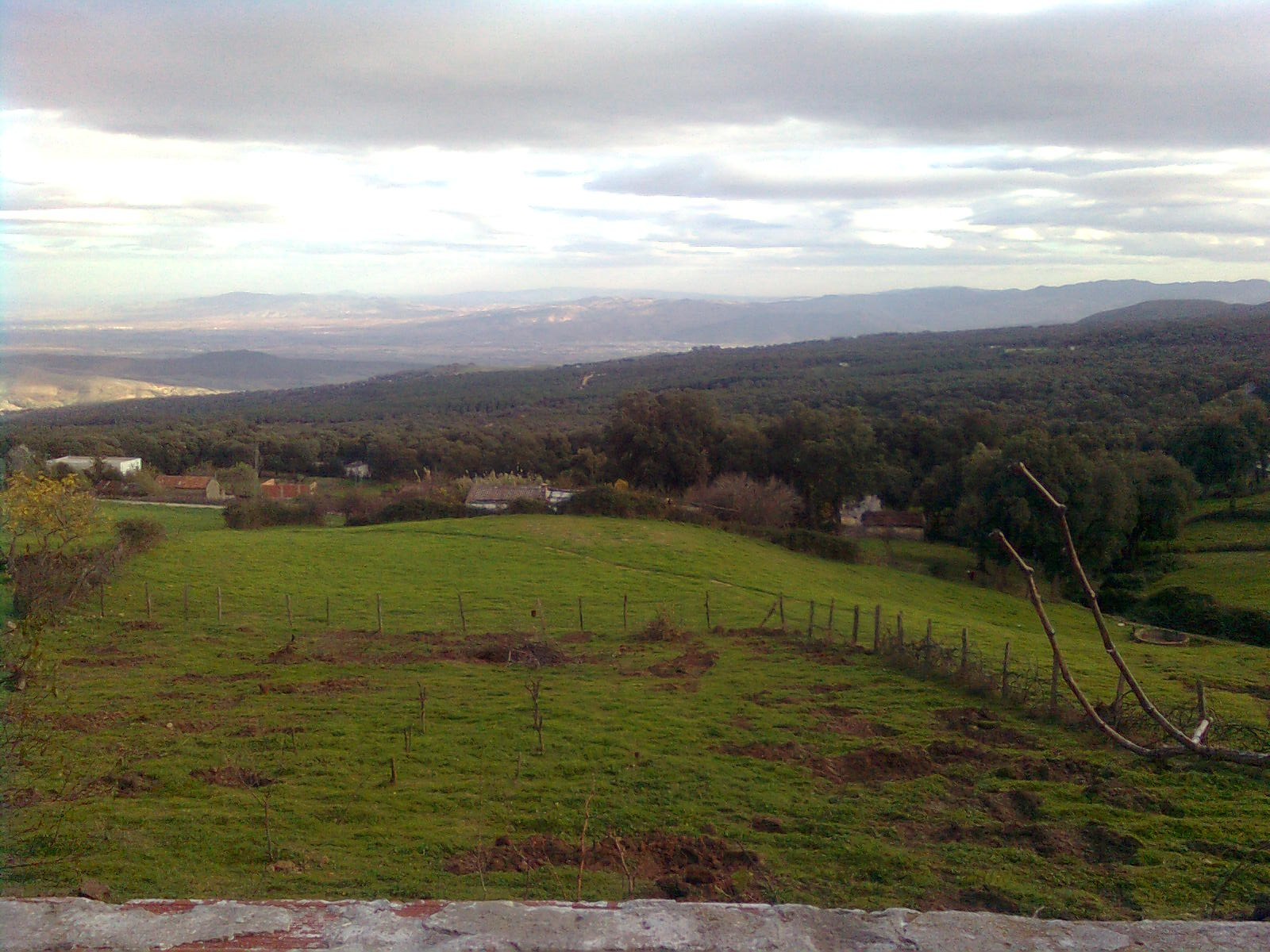

- Location within Tunisia
- Coordinates: 36°35′0″N 8°28′50″E
- Country: Tunisia
- Governorate: Jendouba
- Elevation: 850 m (2,790 ft)
- Time zone: UTC+1 (West Africa Time)

Aïn Soltane is a town in north-western Tunisia.

Ain Soltane is a Tunisian village in the north-west of Ghardimaou in the governorate of Jendouba, near the Tunisian border with Algeria. The village contains a Camping Centre managed by the Ministry of Youth and Sports. Groups of young people come from time to time to spend their summer holidays, especially Tunisian Scouts. In fact, summer camping dates back to the colonial period when Ain Soltane was designated as a national camping centre for the French. And until now there are traces of a swimming pool, bathrooms and camping sites in the village. Recently work has begun to build a national training complex for sports teams, similar to that in Ain Draham. This project will represent a quantum leap in the history of the village and will bring back its old fame.

Weather in Ain Soltane is extremely cold in the winter, and temperatures are generally moderate in the summer. Rainfall rates vary from 1,000 to 1,500 mm a year, and sometimes a blanket of snow covers the village with its thickness bypassing in some cases half a metre. The village is famous for its sweet waters and forever green forests.

== See also ==
- List of cities in Tunisia
