= Civitas Popthensis =

Ancient Roman-Berber city

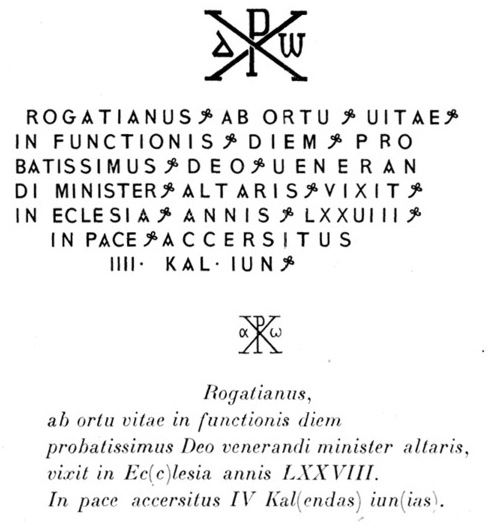
- Epitaph of a cleric named Rogatianus, discovered in the necropolis of the city

- Location within Algeria
- 36.410833°N 8.398333°E
- Location: Algeria
- Region: Souk Ahras Province

Civitas Popthensis was an ancient Roman-Berber city located in the present-day Henchir Kssiba area in the municipality of Ouled Moumen in Souk Ahras Province, Algeria. The word "civitas" is derived from the Latin civis ("city"), meaning that the city was a politically autonomous city-state.

== History ==
The history of the site goes back to the Punic and Numidian periods. The findings in the ruins of the ancient city testifies of a cultural diversity of the city influenced as well by Berbers, Carthaginians and mainly by Romans.

The inscriptions that have been found are in three ancient languages, Latin, Libyan, and Punic. Epigraphy reflects particular local cults to Ba'al Hammon (equivalent to Roman Saturn) and Mercury.

Initially the "Civitas Popthensis" was probably a big village at the centre of an opulent agricultural land with cereal, olive growing, as many presses and livestock have been found in and out of the city. Not far from major trade routes, the city organized the local exchanges between the people of the plain and those of the mountains. Civitas Popthensis was located at the foot of the "Alpes Numidicae" and near the present border between Tunisia and Algeria

Its period of maximum prosperity seems to be at the beginning of the 3rd century, under emperor Septimius Severus. From the area ruins and the evaluation of the flow of water, Julien Guey, a French archeologist, estimated the population of the agglomeration around 10,000 and 12,000 inhabitants. Civitas Popthensis had huge Roman baths and probably a Roman theater.

Paul Monciaux found a Christian epitaph of the beginning on the fifth century, that shows the importance of Christianity in the city when was under the influence of Saint'Augustine. Christianity remained dominant until the arrival of the Arabs, who destroyed the city at the end of the seventh century.

However the history of the city is still not explored; furthermore 80% of this legacy is still buried under the Earth: Serious excavations are needed to illuminate the past of this city.

== Discovery ==
The exact name of the ancient city remained unknown until 1917 where the finding of an official inscription commemorating the building of a temple to Saturn, helped prove that this city was the "Civitas Popthensis".

Excavations in the 1930s resulted in the foreground the religious history of the city by finding a sacred area and 47 steles dedicated to Saturn. Excavations carried out by Julien Guey in the thermal baths in 1936 also allowed to find many Latin inscriptions. The baths were built in large unit and included well-preserved latrines. In 1930, an epitaph dedicated to a cleric named Rogatianus was discovered in the necropolis of the city.

== Bibliography ==
- Laffi, Umberto. Colonie e municipi nello Stato romano Ed. di Storia e Letteratura. Roma, 2007 ISBN 8884983509
- Mommsen, Theodore. The Provinces of the Roman Empire Section: Roman Africa. (Leipzig 1865; London 1866; London: Macmillan 1909; reprint New York 1996) Barnes & Noble. New York, 1996
- Smyth Vereker, Charles. Scenes in the Sunny South: Including the Atlas Mountains and the Oases of the Sahara in Algeria. Volume 2. Publisher Longmans, Green, and Company. University of Wisconsin. Madison,1871 ( Roman Civitas Popthensis )

== See also ==
- Cirta
- Mauretania Caesariensis
- Caesarea
- Auzia
- Rapidum
- Chullu
- Milevum
