= Drea =

Coordinates: 36°07′N 7°53′E

- Commune and town
- Country: Algeria
- Province: Souk Ahras Province
- Time zone: UTC+1 (CET)

Drea is a town and commune in Souk Ahras Province in north-eastern Algeria.
