= Sidi Fredj, Souk Ahras =

Sidi Fredj سيدي فرج
- Commune and town

- Location within Algeria
- Coordinates: 36.1537121°N 8.1952751°E
- Country: Algeria
- Province: Souk Ahras Province

Population (2008)
  - Total: 7,497
- Time zone: UTC+1 (CET)

Sidi Fredj is a town and commune in Souk Ahras Province in north-eastern Algeria.
