= Terraguelt =

Coordinates: 35°53′00″N 7°35′50″E

- Commune and town
- Country: Algeria
- Province: Souk Ahras Province
- Time zone: UTC+1 (CET)

Terraguelt is a town and commune in Souk Ahras Province in north-eastern Algeria.
