= Ragouba =

Coordinates: 36°07′30″N 7°40′00″E

- Commune and town
- Country: Algeria
- Province: Souk Ahras Province
- Time zone: UTC+1 (CET)

Ragouba is a town and commune in Souk Ahras Province in north-eastern Algeria.
