= Ouillen =

- Commune and town

- Location within Algeria
- Coordinates: 36°13′40″N 8°3′53″E
- Country: Algeria
- Province: Souk Ahras Province

Population (2008)
  - Total: 6,544
- Time zone: UTC+1 (CET)

Ouillen is a town and commune in Souk Ahras Province in north-eastern Algeria.

== Settlements ==
- Aïn Battouma
- Kordina
- Aïn Djenane
- Aïn El Mora
- Aïn Messaouda
- Aïn Safra Remila
- Aïn Tirtri
- Aïn Youcif
- Aïn Zrad
- Berrichi
- Boukebch
- Boulebch
- Bouzaroura
- Dhissa
- Derdara
- Djelida
- Draa Safir
- Etarfaya
- El Battoun
- El Ksor
- El Luiza
- El Mekimen
- Ghoumriane
- Hamman Tassa
- Henchir El Ouachaï
- Khenguet Zaouch
- Ras El Kef
- Sidi Khachine
- Takouka
