= Khedara =

Coordinates: 36°17′02″N 8°19′05″E

- Commune and town
- Country: Algeria
- Province: Souk Ahras Province
- Time zone: UTC+1 (CET)

Khedara is a town and commune in Souk Ahras Province in north-eastern Algeria. In 2008, the town was listed as having 8,329 residents.
