= Hanancha =

- Commune and town

- Location within Algeria
- Coordinates: 36°13′N 7°50′E
- Country: Algeria
- Province: Souk Ahras Province
- Time zone: UTC+1 (CET)

Hanancha, also Hannencha, is a town and commune in Souk Ahras Province in north-eastern Algeria.
