= Oum El Adhaim =

Coordinates: 36°02′02″N 7°36′09″E

- Commune and town
- Country: Algeria
- Province: Souk Ahras Province
- Time zone: UTC+1 (CET)

Oum El Adhaim is a town and commune in Souk Ahras Province in north-eastern Algeria.
