= Ouled Driss =

- Commune and town

- Location within Algeria
- Coordinates: 36°21′N 8°1′E
- Country: Algeria
- Province: Souk Ahras Province
- Time zone: UTC+1 (CET)

Ouled Driss is a town and commune in Souk Ahras Province in north-eastern Algeria.
