= Heddada =

Haddada
- Commune and town

- Location within Algeria
- Coordinates: 36°13′51″N 8°20′16″E
- Country: Algeria
- Province: Souk Ahras Province
- Time zone: UTC+1 (CET)

Haddada is a town and commune in Souk Ahras Province in north-eastern Algeria.
