= Zouabi =

Coordinates: 36°03′54″N 7°27′13″E

- Commune and town
- Country: Algeria
- Province: Souk Ahras Province

Population (1998)
  - Total: 3,332
- Time zone: UTC+1 (CET)

Zouabi is a town and commune in Souk Ahras Province in north-eastern Algeria. According to the 1998 census it has a population of 3,332.
