= Mechroha =

Coordinates: 36°21′N 7°50′E

- Commune and town
- Interactive map of Mechroha
- Country: Algeria
- Province: Souk Ahras Province
- Time zone: UTC+1 (CET)

Mechroha is a town and commune in Souk Ahras Province in north-eastern Algeria.
