= Zaarouria =

Coordinates: 36°13′38″N 7°57′28″E

- Commune and town
- Country: Algeria
- Province: Souk Ahras Province
- Time zone: UTC+1 (CET)

Zaarouria is a town and commune in Souk Ahras Province in north-eastern Algeria.
