= Merahna =

Coordinates: 36°11′51″N 8°09′18″E

- Commune and town
- Country: Algeria
- Province: Souk Ahras Province
- Time zone: UTC+1 (CET)

Merahna is a town and commune in Souk Ahras Province in north-eastern Algeria.
