= Ouled Moumen =

Coordinates: 36°20′24″N 8°18′57″E

- Commune and town
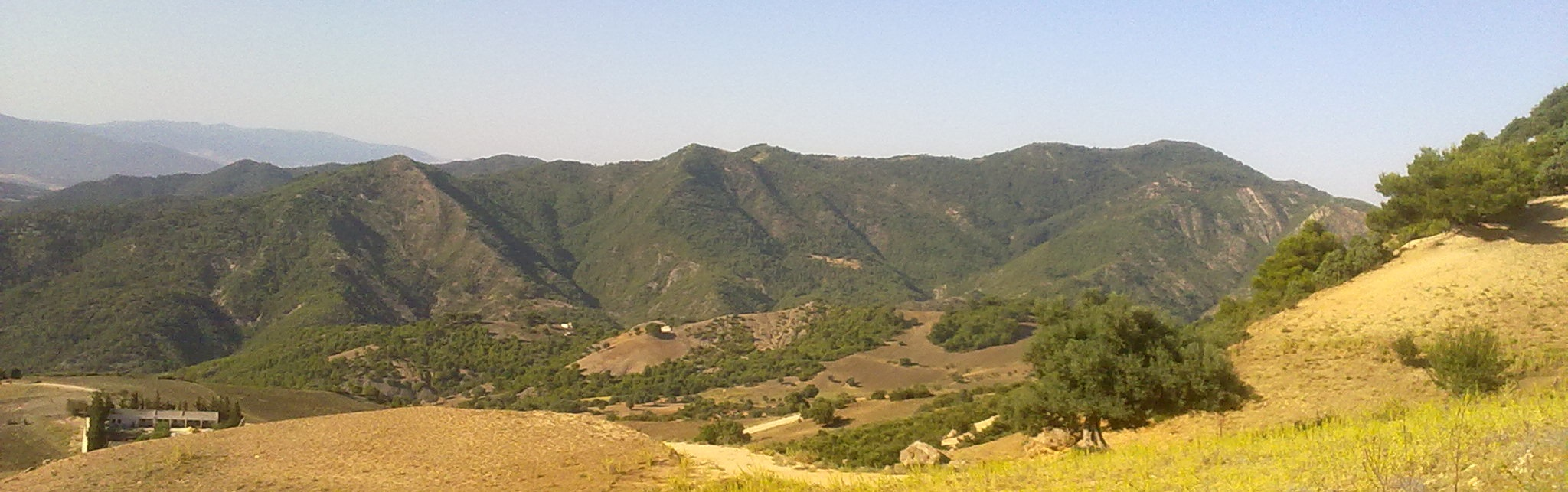
- Ouled Moumen Mountains

- Location within Algeria
- Country: Algeria
- Province: Souk Ahras Province
- Time zone: UTC+1 (CET)

Ouled Moumen is a town and commune in Souk Ahras Province in north-eastern Algeria. The commune occupies the ancient Roman and Carthaginian town of Civitas Popthensis, a town that had an estimated 10,000 to 12,000 inhabitants during the Roman Principate period.
