= Bir Bouhouche =

Coordinates: 36.0500°N 7.4667°E

- Commune and town
- Interactive map of Bir Bouhouche
- Country: Algeria
- Province: Souk Ahras Province
- Time zone: UTC+1 (CET)

Bir Bouhouche is a town and commune in Souk Ahras Province in north-eastern Algeria.
