= Aïn Soltane, Souk Ahras =

Aïn Soltane
- Commune and town

- Location within Algeria
- Coordinates: 36°10′42″N 7°22′09″E
- Country: Algeria
- Province: Souk Ahras Province

Population (2008)
  - Total: 3,091
- Time zone: UTC+1 (CET)

Aïn Soltane is a town and commune in Souk Ahras Province in north-eastern Algeria. It is located 55 km (34 mi) south of Guelma.

== Settlements ==
- Aïn Baïda
- Aïn Bakhbakha
- Aïn Soltane
- Aïn Tagalout
- Ben Labdjaoui
- Benabid
- Benghodbane
- Benzeblah
- Boussaïd
- Chkour
- El Gourzi
- ElKhabia dite Aïn Ferhana
- Enza
- Gubel Ragouba
- Toumia
