= Taoura =

Coordinates: 36°10′N 8°02′E

- Commune and town
- Country: Algeria
- Province: Souk Ahras Province
- Time zone: UTC+1 (CET)

Taoura, known in antiquity as Thagora, is a town and commune in Souk Ahras Province in north-eastern Algeria.

== History ==
Thagora was a Phoenician and Roman town in the African interior. It minted its own bronze coins.
