= M'Daourouch =

Commune in Souk Ahras Province, Algeria

Coordinates: 36°4.6′N 7°49.2′E

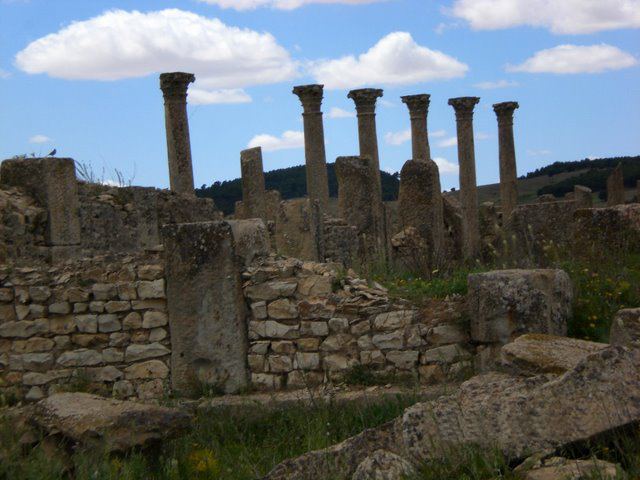
Ruins of the ancient site Madaure (Madaura, Madaurius, M'daourouch)

M'daourouch is a commune in Souk Ahras Province, Algeria. It occupies the site of the Berber-Roman town of Madauros in Numidia.

== Demographics ==
As of the 2008 census, M'daourouch has 36,351 inhabitants, which gives it 11 seats in the PMA.

== History ==
The old Numidian town once belonged to the Masaesylian kingdom of Syphax and was annexed to that of Masinissa at the close of the Second Punic War. It became a Roman colony about the end of the first century and was famous for its schools.

It was the native town of Apuleius, author of The Golden Ass, and of the grammarians Nonius Marcellus and Maximus. Augustine of Hippo studied there; a letter which he addressed later to the inhabitants mentions that many were still pagans.

Madauros had many martyrs known by their epitaphs; several are named in the Roman Martyrology on 4 July.

Its bishopric is included in the Catholic Church's list of titular sees. Three bishops are known: Antigonus, who attended the Council of Carthage of 349; Placentius, the Council of Carthage of 407 and the Conference of 411; and Pudentius, sent into exile by the Vandal king Huneric with the other bishops who had been present at the Synod of 484.

The ruins of Madauros are seen near M'daourouch. A fine Roman mausoleum, vast thermae, a Byzantine fortress and a Roman basilica are noteworthy and have furnished several Christian inscriptions.
