= Souk Ahras Province =

Province of Algeria

Souk Ahras Province ولاية سوق أهراس
- Province
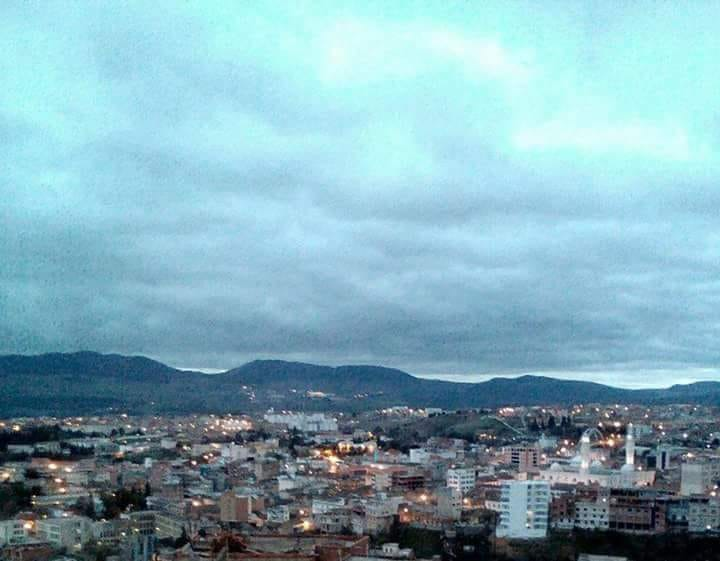

- Map of Algeria highlighting Souk Ahras
- Coordinates: 36°23′N 8°00′E
- Country: Algeria
- Capital: Souk Ahras

Area
  - Total: 4,541 km^{2} (1,753 sq mi)

Population (2008)
  - Total: 440,299
  - Density: 96.96/km^{2} (251.1/sq mi)
- Time zone: UTC+01 (CET)
- Area Code: +213 (0) 37
- ISO 3166 code: DZ-41
- Districts: 10
- Municipalities: 26

Souk Ahras (Arabic: ولاية سوق أهراس) is a province (wilaya) in the Aures region in Algeria, named after its capital, Souk Ahras. It stands on the border between Algeria and Tunisia, and as of 2008, Souk Ahras had a population of 440,299 people.

== Geography ==
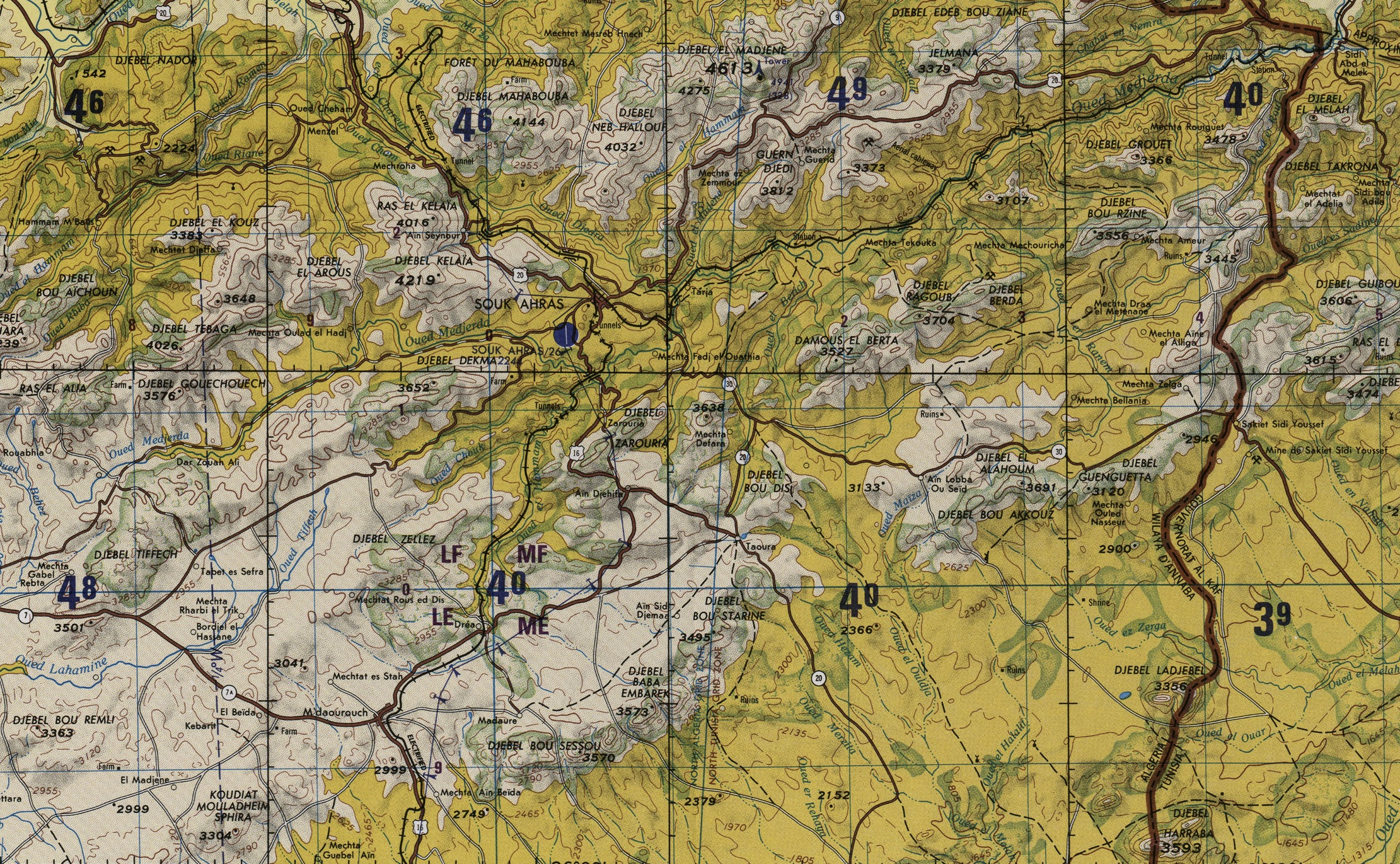
Souk ahras topography

Souk Ahras is situated in the extreme north east of Algeria. Its area is 4360 km^{2}. Its border to the north is the province of El Taref; in the east is Tunisia; westward is the province of Guelma and the province of Oum el Bouaghi; in the south the province of Tebessa. Its geography is composed of three distinct areas, with a mountainous north, the central region being lowlands, and the south being fertile.

== Climate ==
The city of Souk Ahras has a semi continental and humid climate, heavy rains in the north in winter and very hot and dry in the south during summer. The rains are 350–750 mm/year and the temperatures vary from 1 °C to 14 °C in winter and from 25 °C to 38 °C in summer.

The fauna is very rich in Souk Ahras, where species such as the hare, partridge, fox, sparrow, ferret, porcupine and barbarian hart can be found. The flora as well is very rich, with species such as:

- Cork oak: 12,000 hectares
- Zeen oak: 4,600 hectares
- Ash-tree
- Flowering ash
- Aleppo pine (Pinus halepensis)
- Cypress tree
- Mastic-tree
- Lavender
- Heather

== Trading activities ==
Trading activities are widespread in Sedrata and Zaarouria were many public and private companies have been set up:

- National company of painting
- National company of textile
- Brick-making company
- Sedrata metallic company
- Mansouri paper factory
- Hamada dairy
- ALKALAM factory

== Agriculture ==
The most important activities in this region are: agriculture, breeding and com cultivation. The total area is about 436,000 hectares. 235,000 hectares are consecrated to agriculture.

== Infrastructure ==
Basic under structures and the railway system:

Main roads: 600 km Secondary roads: 1600 km. The railway from Souk Ahras to Annaba is 138.8 km, among which 100 km are electrified.

== History ==
The province was created from Guelma Province in 1984.

== Administrative divisions ==
The province is divided into 10 districts (daïras), which are further divided into 26 communes or municipalities.

=== Districts ===
1. Bir Bouhouche
2. Haddada
3. M'Daourouch
4. Mechroha
5. Merahna
6. Ouled Driss
7. Oum El Adhaïm
8. Sedrata
9. Souk Ahras
10. Taoura

=== Communes ===
Communes of Souk Ahras Province

1. Ain Zana
2. Ain Soltane
3. Bir Bouhouche
4. Drea
5. Haddada
6. Hanancha
7. Khedara
8. Khemissa
9. M'Daourouch
10. Mechroha
11. Merahna
12. Oued Keberit
13. Ouillen
14. Ouled Driss
15. Ouled Moumem
16. Oum El Adhaim
17. Ragouba
18. Safel El Ouiden
19. Sedrata
20. Sid Fredj
21. Souk Ahras
22. Taoura
23. Terraguelt
24. Tiffech (Tifash)
25. Zaarouria
26. Zouabi
