= Oued Keberit =

Coordinates: 35°56′N 7°55′E

- Commune and town
- Country: Algeria
- Province: Souk Ahras Province

Population (1998)
  - Total: 5,000
- Time zone: UTC+1 (CET)
- Postal code: 41018

Oued Keberit is a town and commune in Souk Ahras Province in north-eastern Algeria.
