= Bir El Ater Province =

Bir El Ater Province ولاية بئر العاتر ⴰⴳⴻⵣⴷⵓ ⵏ ⴱⵉⵔ ⵍⵄⴰⵜⴻⵔ
- Province
- Map of Bir El Ater Province
- Coordinates: 34°44′55″N 8°03′29″E
- Country: Algeria
- Created: 2026
- Capital: Bir El Ater

Area
  - Total: 5,100 km^{2} (2,000 sq mi)

Population (2008)
  - Total: 98,441
  - Density: 19/km^{2} (50/sq mi)
- Time zone: UTC+01 (CET)
- Area code: +213
- ISO 3166 code: DZ-12
- Districts: 2
- Municipalities: 4

Bir El Ater Province (Arabic: ولاية بئر العاتر, romanized: Wilāyat Biʾr al-ʿĀtir) is a province (wilaya) in northeastern Algeria, with Bir El Ater as its provincial capital. It was created in 2026 by separation from Tébessa Province.

The province lies on the Tunisian border and covers an area of about 5,100 km². Around 98,441 people lived in the province at the 2008 census, giving it a population density of about 19 inhabitants per square kilometre.

== Administrative divisions ==
The wilaya of Bir El Ater is divided into 4 communes, grouped into 2 districts (daïras).

Daïras	Communes	
Daïras	Name	Pop. 2008
Bir El Ater	Bir El Ater	77,727
Bir El Ater	El Ogla El Melha	5,899
Negrine	Negrine	9,445
Negrine	Ferkane	5,370
