= Muqaddam (disambiguation) =

Muqaddam is an Arabic and Sufi title.

Muqaddam or Mukaddam or Moqaddam or Moqadam or Mokeddem or Mokadem or Mükeddem may also refer to:

== People ==
- Abdullah Mukaddam, Pakistani cricketer
- Ahmad Khan Muqaddam, Iranian governor
- Ali Mukaddam, Canadian actor
- Hakim El Mokeddem, French footballer
- Ismael Mokadem, Moroccan footballer
- Malika Mokeddem, Algerian writer
- Maryam Moqadam, Iranian actress
- Muhammad al-Faqih al-Muqaddam, Yemeni Sufi

== Places ==
- Moqaddam, a village in Iran
- Bir El Mokadem, a town and commune in Algeria
- Bir Mokadem District, a district in Algeria
- Qeshlaq-e Moqaddam Shabandeh, a village in Iran
- Safra-ye Moqaddam, a village in Iran

== Geography ==
- Wadi Muqaddam, a river in Sudan

== History ==
- Moqaddam family, an old Turkic family/dynasty in Iran

== See also ==
- Muqaddimah (disambiguation)
- Moghaddam, Persian form of the Arabic name
