= List of mines in Algeria =

This list of mines in Algeria is subsidiary to the list of mines article and lists working, defunct and future mines in the country and is organised by the primary mineral output. For practical purposes stone, marble and other quarries may be included in this list.

- Feldspar mines
  - Aïn Barbar mine
- Iron mines
  - Gâra Djebilet mine
  - Boukhadra iron mine
- Lead and zinc mines
  - Tala Hamza mine
- Phosphate Mines
  - Betita mine
  - Bled El Hadba mine
  - Djebel Onk mine
  - Djemi Djema mine
  - Kef Snoun mine
