= El Kouif District =

Coordinates: 35°29′59″N 8°19′21″E

- District
- Country: Algeria
- Province: Tébessa Province
- Time zone: UTC+1 (CET)

El Kouif District is a district of Tébessa Province, Algeria.

The district is further divided into 3 municipalities:

- El Kouif
- Bekkaria
- Boulhaf Dir
