= Bir Mokadem District =

Coordinates: 35°22′21″N 7°48′27″E

- District
- Country: Algeria
- Province: Tébessa Province
- Time zone: UTC+1 (CET)

Bir Mokadem District is a district of Tébessa Province, Algeria.

The district is further divided into 3 municipalities:

- Bir El Mokadem
- Guorriguer
- Hammamet
