= El Aouïnet District =

Coordinates: 35°51′57″N 7°53′14″E

- District
- Country: Algeria
- Province: Tébessa Province
- Time zone: UTC+1 (CET)

El Aouïnet District is a district of Tébessa Province, Algeria.

The district is further divided into 2 municipalities:

- El Aouinet
- Boukhadra
