= Ouenza District =

Coordinates: 35°56′42″N 8°08′07″E

- District
- Country: Algeria
- Province: Tébessa Province
- Time zone: UTC+1 (CET)

Ouenza District is a district of Tébessa Province, Algeria.

The district is further divided into 3 municipalities:

- Ouenza
- Aïn Zerga
- El Meridj
