= Oum Ali District =

Coordinates: 35.0107°N 8.3009°E

- District
- Country: Algeria
- Province: Tébessa Province
- Time zone: UTC+1 (CET)

Oum Ali District is a district of Tébessa Province, Algeria.

During the Arab Spring of 2011, Oum Ali District was home to hundreds of Tunisian refugee dissidents.

The district is further divided into 2 municipalities:

- Oum Ali
- Safsaf El Ouesra
