= Thala-Kasserine Disturbances =

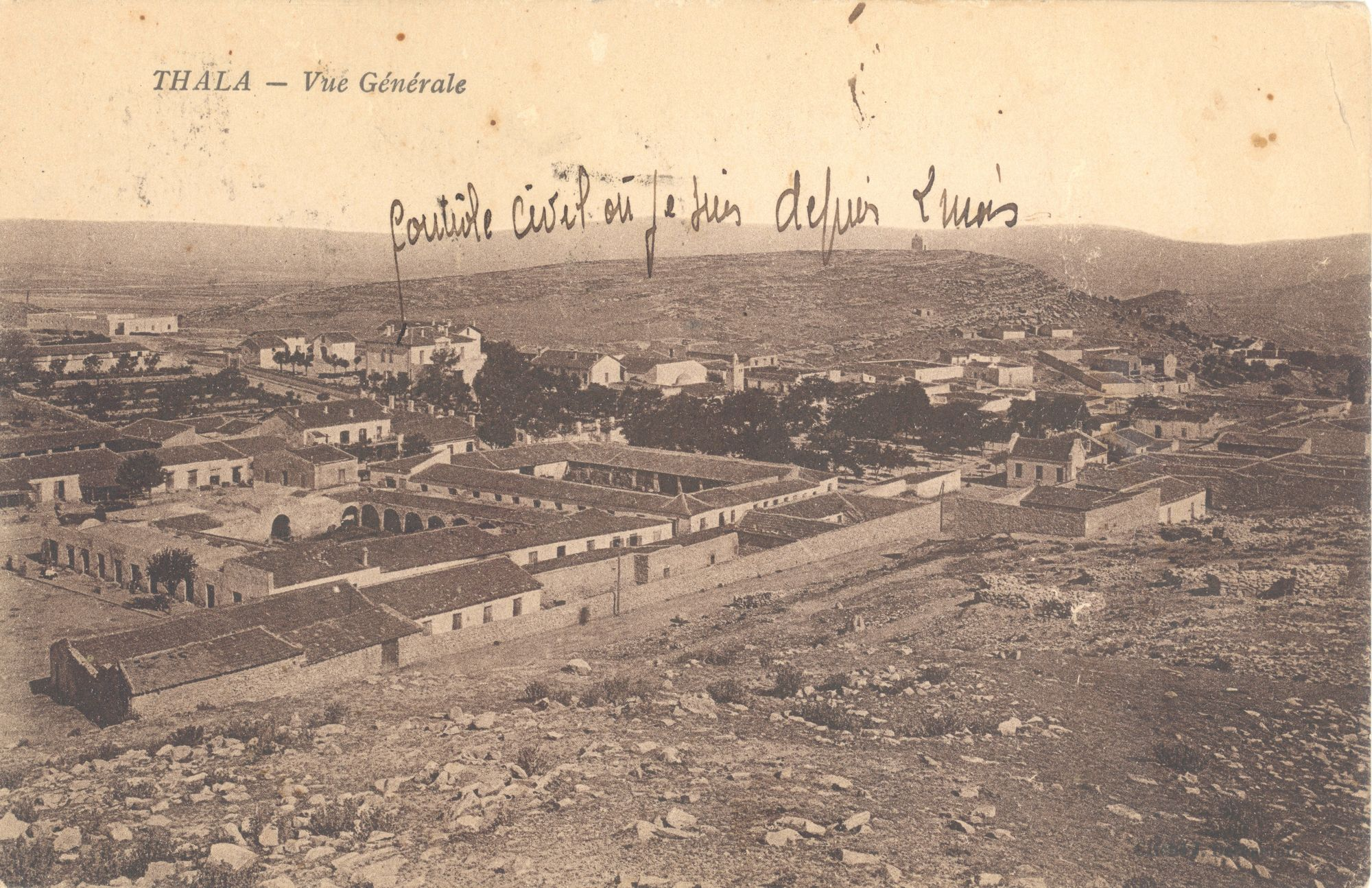
The town of Thala around 1925

The Thala-Kasserine Disturbances were an episode of unrest in April 1906 in western Tunisia, the first violent resistance against authority under the French protectorate since its establishment in 1881. Inspired by an Algerian marabout, insurgents killed three French settlers in the Kasserine region before a gunfight in Thala left around a dozen of them dead and the rest in custody.

During this revolt, the 3rd Algerian Spahis Regiment deployed a squadron from Tebessa to confront the Fraichich tribe, who notably occupied the territory of El Ma Labiodh. The Fraichich, known for their resistance, were engaged in clashes and contestation against colonial forces and the tribes who supported them (Brarchas, Allaouna of Nemencha and Ouled Sidi Yahia ben Taïeb) attempting to assert control over the region at the city of Tebessa since as early as the attack of 1853 barely 2 years following the French occupation of Tebessa and it's region.

== Background ==
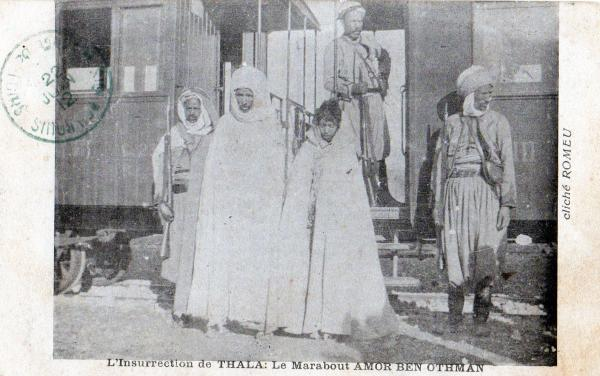
Amor ben Othman, who inspired the uprising

The region's remoteness and the poverty of its soil had long preserved it from land acquisitions by European settlers. Thus in 1906, of 933,000 hectares, fewer than 10,000 had come under European ownership. However even this small change upset the balance of life for local people, as the land taken by Europeans was the most productive. Even on poorer land, the new owners would prevent the nomadic tribes from passing across it unless they paid a fee for grazing their animals. Furthermore, the two years before the unrest had seen very poor harvests and the local people were sinking to severe hardship, so between 1904 and 1906 the tax revenue fell by half. All of these circumstances created a climate of tension between the local people and the colonists.

The exceptionally harsh winter of 1905-06 was the last straw. At Thala, the snow fell uninterruptedly from 6–10 February and the houses were buried in snowdrifts 2.5m deep. Indeed, some houses collapsed under the weight of the snow. For eight days, the town was completely cut off from the world. Many thousands of animals, already in poor condition as winter started, succumbed to the cold and the lack of provisions. The local Fraichiche nomads lost 9,000 sheep and another 9,000 goats which starved as the pastures were deep in snow. Some people were surviving on wild beets and boiled mallow. Faced with this distress, the authorities did nothing to organise help and refused requests for seed.

A few months previously, a marabout named Amor Ben Othman from Souk Ahras in Algeria had arrived in the region, One of his close associates was Ali ben Mohammed ben Salah, a local sheikh who had been dismissed by the central authorities for misappropriation of funds, who encouraged people to believe that Amor ben Othman had supernatural powers. Against the background of the extreme winter conditions, The presence of Amor ben Othman served as a catalyst for local despair.

== Events of 26–27 April ==
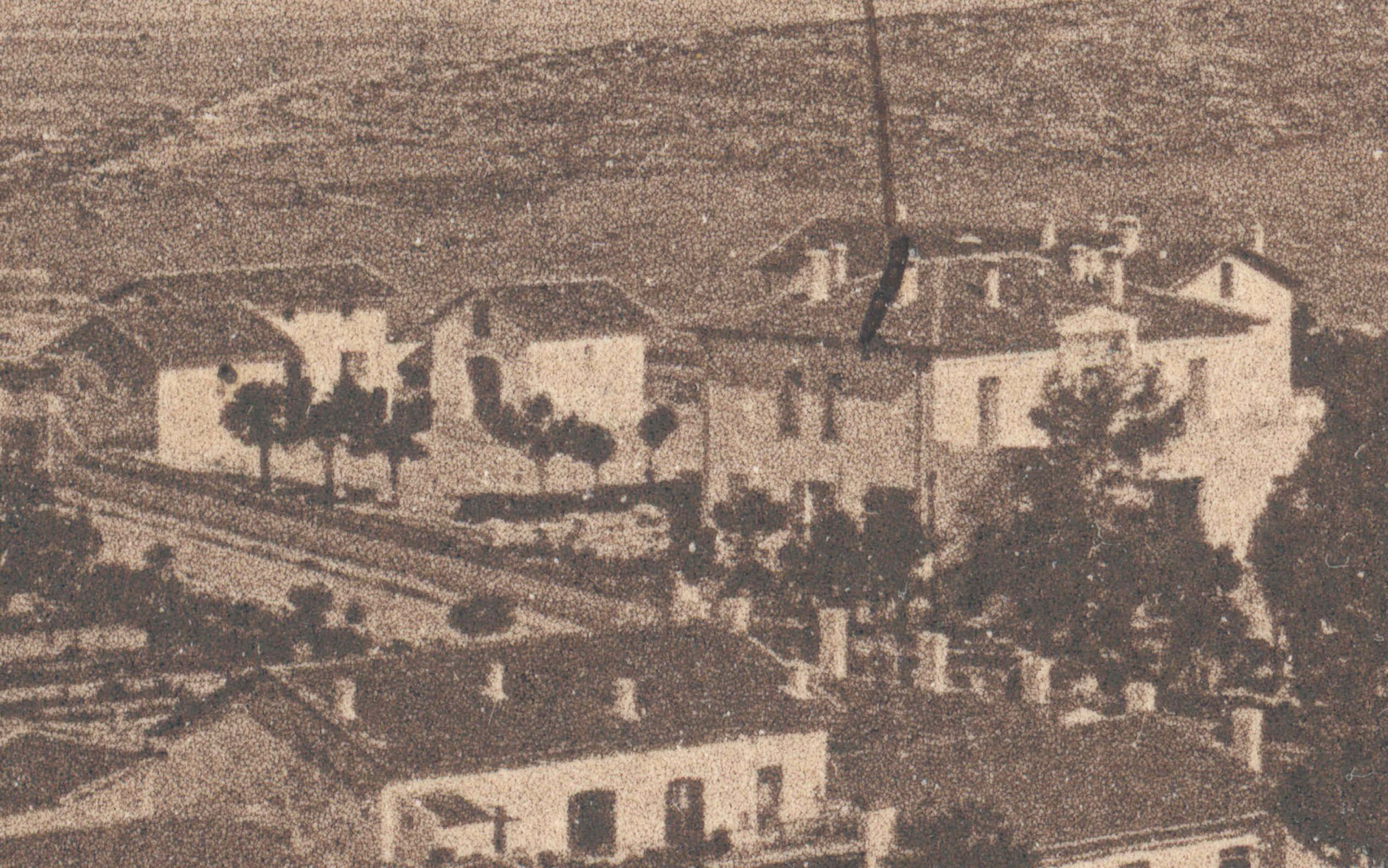
French civil administration office in Thala around 1925.

On 26 April some dozens of Fraichiche bedouin from the Ouled Néji, Gmata, Hnadra and Hrakta subclans who were encamped on the plain of Foussana, near Kasserine, attacked the farm of a French settler named Lucien Salle who was known as a violent, brutal, and greedy man. They were unaware that Salle himself was absent, and when they arrived at his farm they were met by his brother Henri, who was quickly killed with a single shot. When his servant Domenico Mira tried to help him, he was stabbed and his life only spared because he recited the shahada. Salle's mother had her throat cut while she lay in bed. Another servant, Tournier, was taken prisoner and he too saved his life by reciting the shahada, whereupon he was forcibly circumcised. The farm was looted, and three employees, Graffaud, Martin and Sagnes, who lived nearby on a stud farm, were taken prisoner after accepting forced conversion to Islam.

The insurgents now moved on to another farm owned by a settler named Bertrand. In contrast with Salle, Bertrand had worked to establish good relations with his Fraichiche neighbours. At this farm three occupants all converted to avoid death but one, an Italian named Delrio, refused, so he was killed and his body burned. The farm was not however looted and the bedouin moved on to the mines at Jebel ech Chambi where all the Europeans were summoned to convert. All the prisoners were made to wear Tunisian dress and sent to the marabout Amor ben Othman, who had remained behind at the encampment.

The next day, encouraged by their success, they decided to attack the French civil administration office in Thala, Tunisia, a symbol of colonial rule. Ben Othman had convinced them they were invincible, telling them that the sticks they were carrying would spit fire when pointed at the infidels, and that the bullets of the settlers would melt like drops of water when they touched their bodies. However, when they reached Thala they found themselves facing a well-defended base where dozens of armed French settlers and Italian workers fired on them at close range, leaving between ten and fourteen of them dead. They were routed.

Amor Ben Othman and his accomplices offered no resistance when they were arrested, and all their prisoners were set free.

== Trial and sentencing ==
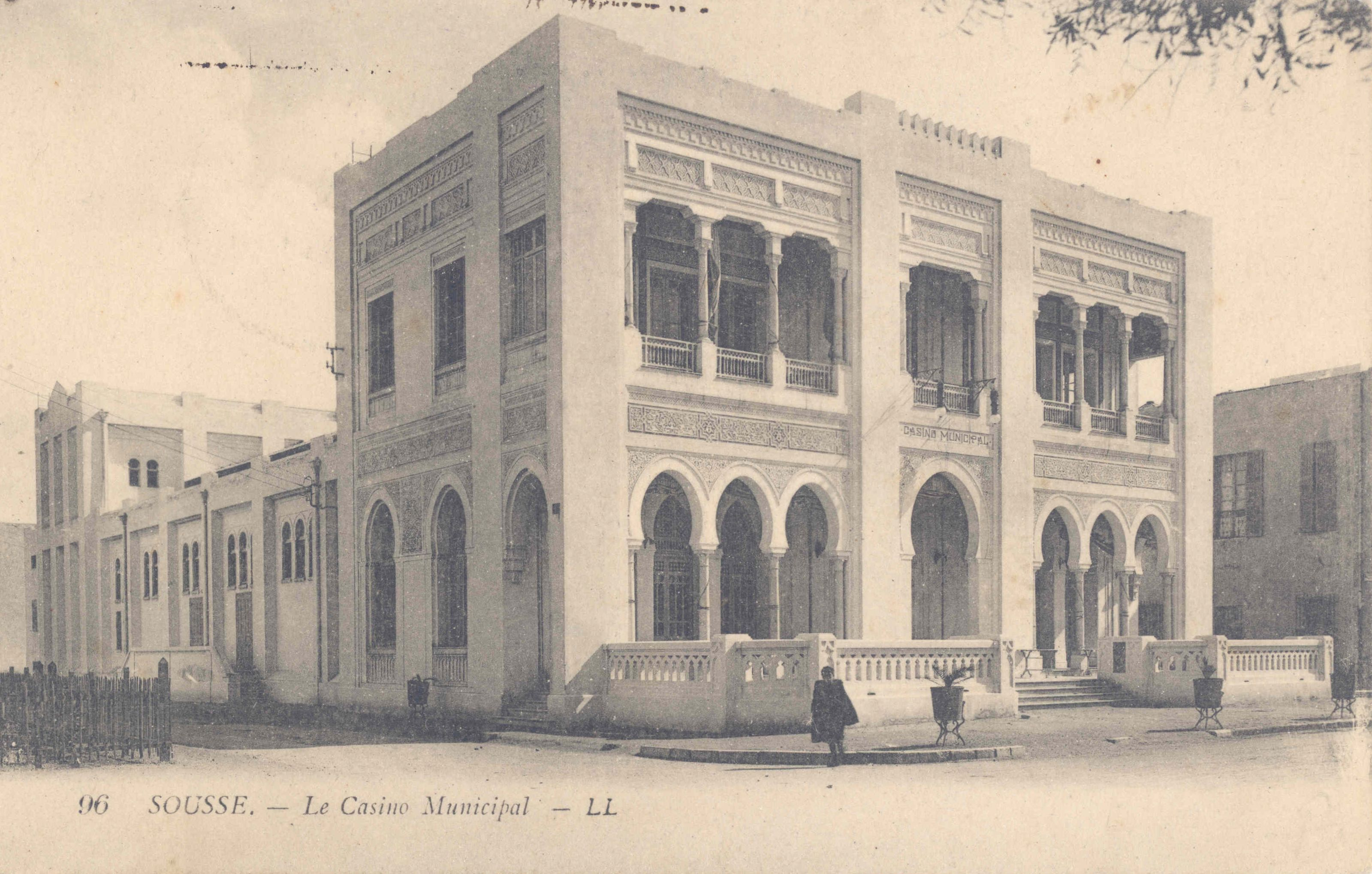
The Casino in Sousse where the trial was held

The trial of Ben Othman and fifty-eight of his associates was held in Sousse from 21 November-12 December 1906. Two of the accused were still at large and were tried in absentia.

- 44 men were charged with looting
- 1, Salah Ben Mohamed Ben Saad, known as El Ouagaf, was charged with the murder of un pour assassinat, le dénommé
- 25 were charged with being accessories to the murder of Henri Salles
- 26 were charged with being accessories to the murder of Salles' mother
- 26 were charged with the attempted murder of Mira
- the same 26 were charged with the murder of Delrio
- 43 were charged with aiding and abetting the accused above
- 2 were charged with assault against an employee of Salles from the stud farm
- 1 was charged with violence towards Miss Cécile Bertrand
- 3 were charged with violence towards Modolo
- 11 were charged with attempted looting
- 3, Amor Ben Othman, his assistant and their host, Ferhat Ben Mohamed Ben Salah, were charged with conspiring to commit all of the crimes above

The trial lasted 22 days and as it unfolded the respective roles of the accused became clearer. Numerous witnesses accused Salah Ben Mohamed Ben Saad of having struck the first blow against Henri Salles, using a sabre found in the house. He was also implicated in the murder of Madame Salle, killed by Ahmed Ben Messaoud, who had died in the rifle fire at Thala. Witnesses also said he had struck Delrio two blows with the sabre.

Mohamed Ben Belgacem Ben Goaïed was accused of the murder of Delrio, on whom he had fired at close range. He had also been seen brandishing his weapon and shouting 'See, Mohammed, how we convert the Christians to Islam!'. At the Salle farm, he had chased after Domenico Mira, but spared his life when he converted.

Amor Ben Ali Ben Amor was accused of the murder of Delrio, whose skull he had smashed with a blow from a spade. He had then prepared the bonfire to burn his body.

Harrat Ben Belgacem Ben Ali was accused of taking part in the murder of Delrio by stabbing him several times with a dagger.

Ali Ben Mohamed Ben Salah and Amor Ben Othman were accused of inciting the murders, but Ben Othman's culpability was diminished following testimony from doctors who had examined him and attributed his limited intelligence to historic attacks of epilepsy. The real instigator appeared to be Ali Ben Mohamed Ben Salah who had exploited the fervour created by the marabout's presence aura to trigger the attacks.

Ferhat, who had provided Amor Ben Othman with accommodation, was likewise accused of having sheltered the organiser of the murders, taken part in preparatory meetings and kept the captured French people prisoner.

At the end of the hearings, the prosecutor, Liautier, demanded four death penalties and many sentences of lifelong forced labour, with lighter penalties for the accomplices. The verdicts were handed down on 12 December.

- Three death penalties: Salah Ben Mohamed Ben Saad, known as El Ouagaf, Mohamed Ben Belgacem Ben Goaïed, and Amor Ben Ali Ben Amor known as Bouaïda
- Two sentences to lifelong hard labour: Ali Ben Mohamed Ben Salah and Harrat Ben Belgacem Ben Ali
- Nine sentences to twenty years of forced labour
- Eight sentences, including Ben Othman, to ten years of forced labour
- Four sentences to five years of forced labour
- Three sentences to ten years' imprisonment
- Four sentences to five years' imprisonment
- Eight sentences to two years' imprisonment
- Sixteen acquittals

Ferhat was acquitted after claiming he had sheltered Ben Othman against his will. His advanced age (he was 65) was also taken into account. Harrat Ben Belgacem Ben Ali escaped the death sentence thanks to his youth (he was 20).

== Reaction ==
Initial reports of the disturbances in the French press strongly emphasised the idea that 'religious fanaticism' was the cause. Parallels were drawn with events in Aïn Torki (Margueritte) in Algeria in 1901. There too, incited by a marabout, Europeans had been forced to convert or die. The newspapers emphasised the small number of settlers in the region, which, they maintained, meant that challenging the protectorate itself could not have been the motive for the attacks. This was also the opinion of the French Resident General. The more extreme elements among the settlers saw the cause as being the lax and cowardly colonial policy which led to a lack of security in remote regions, and a failing justice system. These elements were reassured by the convictions which were for criminal offences, ignoring any idea of a political dimension.

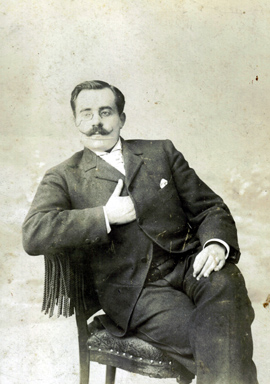
Portrait of Abdeljelil Zaouche.

Nonetheless, other voices emphasised the lack of education in the Thala region and ascribed the unrest to this. Abdeljelil Zaouche wrote on 25 December 1906 in Le Temps 'The day when, in North Africa, primary education is compulsory, we will no longer see Muslim peasants hanging on the words of a Yacoub, as at Margueritte, or lending an obliging ear to the nonsense of an Amor ben Othman, as at Thala. Today, the Arab of the countryside is deprived of all intellectual culture; once he is enlightened he will be the first to mock the fanatics who emerge from the brotherhoods that all educated Muslims deprecate.'

In fact, since 1897, the main settler lobby had insisted on an end to primary school education for Muslim children and the Thala-Kasserine Disturbances were perhaps the result. In his Nouveau dictionnaire de pédagogie et d’instruction primaire, Benjamin Buisson, Director of the Boys' Normal School in Tunis and brother of Ferdinand Buisson, former Director of primary school education in France, wrote 'The events of Kasserine and Thala, in which a young Algerian marabout crossed the border and managed to raise an ignorant and fanatical population against isolated French settlers, demonstrate how dangerous it is to deprive the native population, and the young generation most of all, of all European contact. The French school, with its schoolmaster often serving also as postmaster, is one of the best means of bringing civilisation, one of the surest and cheapest weapons against superstition and fanaticism.'

The decision was therefore taken to press ahead with opening new schools. By 1908 the number of Tunisian school pupils had recovered to its previous level in 1897.

=== Reporting by Myriam Harry ===
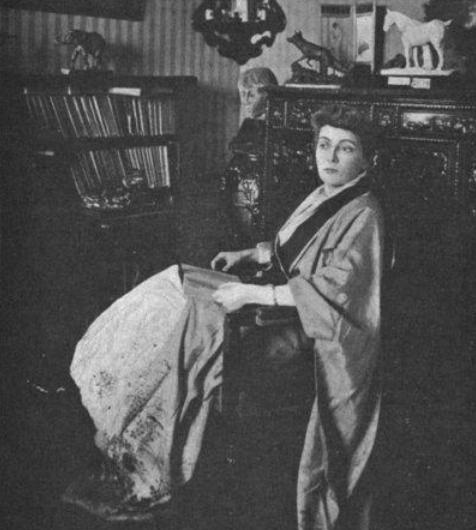
Myriam Harry around 1904

On the 23 February 1907 the novelist Myriam Harry, who had attended the trial, published a piece of reportage about it. It was noteworthy for the sympathetic tone it adopted towards the accused. According to the historian Charles-André Julien, 'Myriam Harry's account caused a scandal in the French community in Tunisia, not for its portrayal of the settlers, but for the sympathy it expressed for the marabout, offering, if not a justification, at least an explanation for the revolt.' Five years later, in his work 'How France Will Lose its Colonies', Henri Tridon stated that 'In Tunisia we have a bitter memory of the article by Mme. Myriam Harry in the Kasserine Disturbances because of the tender portrait she painted of the marabout, who had instigated the insurrection and the massacres which followed.'

=== Reprieve for the condemned ===
Appeals from those convicted were rejected on 31 January 1907. A plea for clemency for those condemned to death was then sent to the French Minister of Justice. It was supported by the Resident General Stephen Pichon, who felt that the tribe had been punished sufficiently and that a return to calm was necessary. Four members of the jury from the trial also supported the appeal, and the publication of Myriam Harry's article on 23 February tended to support this view. On 23 March the three death penalties were commuted to lifelong hard labour, but the six other sentences who had appealed for clemency were upheld. They were transported to the penal colonies in French Guiana.

== Legacy ==
The Thala-Kasserine disturbances might be considered as initial events in the emergence of the Tunisian national movement (one of the French prisoners testified that he had heard the raiders declare that they planned to march on El Kef and Tunis). However it is striking that the original group of around fifty insurgents did not succeed in mobilising any of their neighbours. Furthermore, although there were many Europeans at the mines of Ain Khemouda, close by the place where they had set off on their day of killing and looting, they had chosen to walk 12 kilometres to attack the farm of Lucien Salle, who was particularly hated. The most recent research concludes that 'born spontaneously from poverty and the particular conditions of the region, the Thala insurrection was not followed by unrest in any other part of the country and remained entirely separate from the claims of the movement which affected Tunis at the time.'

== See also ==
- History of Tunisia
- Tunisian national movement
- History of French-era Tunisia
