= Kef Snoun mine =

Mine in Tébessa, Algeria

- Location: Tébessa Province, Algeria
- Products: Phosphates

The Kef Snoun mine is a large mine located in Tébessa Province, Algeria. Kef Snoun represents one of the largest phosphate reserves in the country, having estimated reserves of 520 million tonnes of ore grading 12% P_{2}O_{5}.

== See also ==
- List of mines in Algeria
