= Youks-les-Bains =

Coordinates: 35°27′N 7°57′E

Youks-les-Bains was the French colonial name of modern Hammamet, Tébessa.

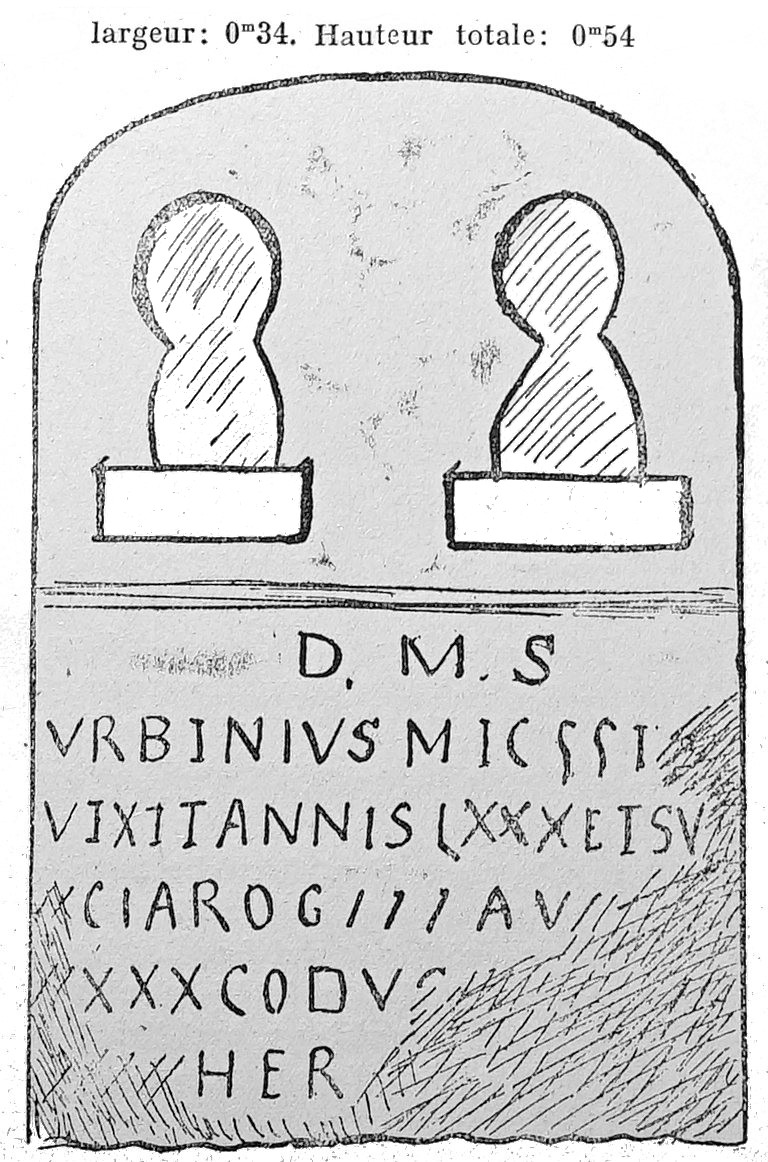
Inscription romaine découverte à Youkous.

This was the site of the Ancient Roman city and bishopric of Caesarea in Numidia, which only remains as a Latin Catholic titular see.

In World War II, its Youks-les-Bains Airfield played a part in the allied fight against the Nazi Afrika Korps.
