= Djebel Onk mine =

Phosphate mine in Algeria

Coordinates: 34.7°N 8.0°E

- Interactive map of Djebel Onk mine
- Location: Bir el Ater, Tébessa Province, Algeria
- Products: Phosphates

The Djebel Onk mine is a large mine located in the Tébessa Province. Djebel Onk represents one of the largest phosphates reserve in Algeria having estimated reserves of 2.8 billion tonnes of ore grading 24% P_{2}O_{5}.

== Mining Railway ==
A new mining railway line is being built in 2024 to transport phosphates from the deposits near Djebel Onk to the Mediterranean harbour in Annaba. Once the line is operational, over 23 million tonnes of phosphate are planned be transported annually.
