= AOQ =

AOQ can refer to:

- Apparat Organ Quartet, an Icelandic electronica band
- Aerovías, a defunct airline based in Guatemala from 1977 to 1998, by ICAO code
- Aappilattoq Heliport (Avannaata), a heliport in Aappilattoq, Avannaata municipality, Greenland
- African Petroleum Corporation, a corporation which Frank Timiș was formerly part of until 2014, by National Stock Exchange of Australia ticker; see Frank Timiș#African Petroleum
- Australian Organization for Quality, an organization that awarded Mohamed Zairi the "Outstanding Contribution to Global Quality" award in 2013
