= El Ma Labiodh District =

Coordinates: 35°12′24″N 8°10′11″E

- District
- Country: Algeria
- Province: Tébessa Province
- Time zone: UTC+1 (CET)

El Ma Labiodh District is a district of Tébessa Province, Algeria.

The district is further divided into 2 municipalities:

- El Ma El Biodh
- Lahouidjbet
