= El Ogla District =

Coordinates: 35°11′17″N 7°28′11″E

- District
- Country: Algeria
- Province: Tébessa Province
- Time zone: UTC+1 (CET)

El Ogla District is a district of Tébessa Province, Algeria.

The district is further divided into 4 municipalities:

- El Ogla
- Bedjene
- El Mezerra
- Stah Guentis
