= Mohamed Zairi =

British academic and researcher

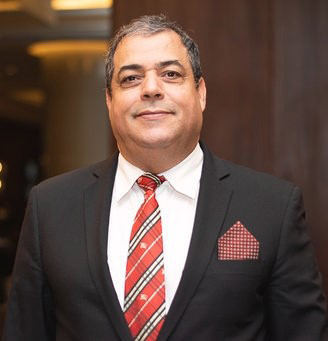
- Born: Algeria
- Education: North Staffordshire Polytechnic
- Occupations: Author, emeritus professor at the University of Bradford, consultant, and entrepreneur
- Website: ecbpm.com

Mohamed Zairi is a British academic and researcher in the field of total quality management and excellence management. Over a period of 35 years, he has been influencing Quality Management Thinking. He is also recognized as a luminary in the Global Quality Horizon. In addition to TQM and Excellence Management, Zairi has immense expertise in areas such as Performance Measurement, Business Process Management, Change Management, Innovation Management, Governance, and Service Improvement.

Zairi is also known as one of the main pioneers in the field of Benchmarking and Best Practice Management. He helped to bridge the gap between academic thinking and the application of practical solutions to problems by translating novel ideas and innovative concepts into useful and purposeful guidelines and blueprints that can be used by managers in all sectors of the industry and commerce. He is currently serving as the Editorial Director of the Benchmarking International Journal (BIJ), now in its 27th volume. In 2010, he was awarded the 2009 ASQ Grant Medal for the development of quality management educational programs. He was also awarded the Yoshio Kondo academic prize (2010), celebrating his outstanding research carried out over several years that have advanced the global body of quality knowledge.

Zairi is a frequent speaker and gave over 600 keynote addresses at national and international conferences. He also had numerous papers published in industry journals. He has written extensively about the role of Quality in all 4 Industrial Revolutions. At present, he is focusing on Quality in the digital era and is one of the originators of the concept of Quality 4.0. Recently, he has published several works on the disruptive thinking of Quality 4.0 in the World and is also leading a major research on Quality Future Thinking.

Over the last 25 years, Zairi has played a significant role in growing the quality movement in the MENA region. At present, he is acting as a senior advisor for Prime Minister's Office (UAE Government). He has also acted in the capacity of Jury Chairman of various government programs including the Abu Dhabi Award for Excellence in Government Performance, Dubai Government Excellence Program and Sheikh Khalifa Government Excellence Program.

== Early life and work ==
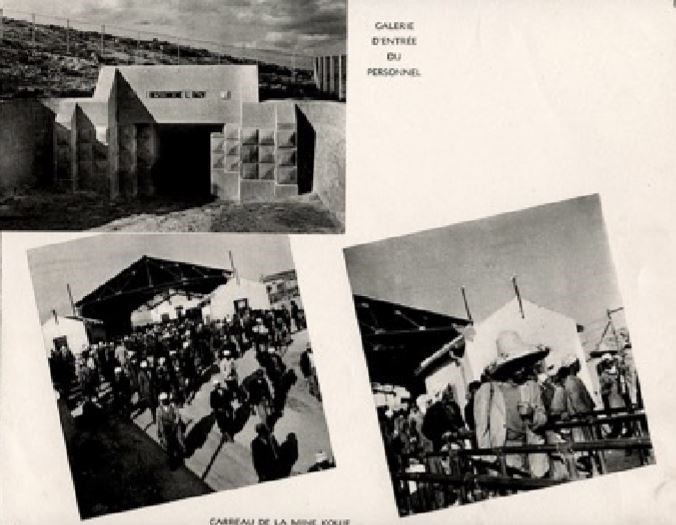
El Kouif

Zairi was born on 17 September 1956, the fifth of ten children and raised in a small Algerian town of El Kouif, 4 km from The Tunisian Border. His father worked in a phosphate mine all his life.

Zairi attended primary and secondary school in El Kouif and moved to Annaba, a relatively bigger town on Algeria's Mediterranean coast, to continue his college education.

He got his French Baccalaureate with distinction and immigrated to the UK in October 1975, to pursue his higher education. He completed his BSc (Hons) in Polymer Science and Technology from the University of Aston, Birmingham, in 1979; MSc in Safety Technology in 1980, from the same University; Postgraduate Diploma in Human Resource and Operations Management from De Montfort University, Leicester in 1985; and PhD in the Management of New Technology from the North Staffordshire Polytechnic (University of Staffordshire) in 1989.

Zairi began his career by working in the private sector as a production control coordinator and then moving on to be a production manager. He pioneered the Benchmarking and Best Practice Movement in the UK since mid 80s. During 1985-86, Zairi actively worked in the area of Advanced Manufacturing Technology (AMT) and created an industrial network for the exchange of Best Practices, and developed methods and guidelines useful to companies when considering the introduction of complex technology-based innovations. The work was later carried out at Staffordshire Polytechnic from 1986–1989.

== Career progression and contributions ==
Zairi was the first academic professional to be sponsored by Unilever PLC, in the area of Quality and Innovation Management in Europe, which had a lasting impact on the whole Unilever Group and hundreds of organisations covering the Fast-Moving Consumer Goods Sector, Engineering, Aerospace, Automobile, Communications and Computer Industry. He held the Unilever Sponsorship from 1990 to 1995 at the Bradford University School of Management.

In 1991, Zairi was appointed as a member of the European Foundation for Quality Management (EFQM) Working Group, UK for 2 years.

In 1993, Zairi was appointed by the UK Government as a Non Executive Director at Huddersfield NHS Trust since its inception as a Trust. During a period of six years (1993-1999), he has made significant contributions in various aspects such as support in the development of a Risk Management Strategy based on Quality Principles, which later became one of the flagships of the Trust and was adopted widely by other Trusts; the encouragement of the Trust to gain ISO 9000 Certification in several of its support services and the contribution of various papers and debates for the development of a seamless and patient orientated healthcare delivery approach.

Between 1994-95, Zairi helped set up the European Best Practice Benchmarking Award, for which he was appointed as Chairman.

=== European Centre for Best Practice Management (ECBPM) ===
Since 1996, Zairi had taken up the responsibility of managing The European Centre for Total Quality Management (ECTQM). ECTQM, an entirely externally funded centre based within Bradford University School of Management, was aimed at supporting industry and commerce through applied research and advisory work in the area of Best Practice Management. In September 2009, ECTQM was renamed as European Centre for Best Practice Management (ECBPM) and became a standalone independent non-profit centre. ECBPM is now an internationally known and respected centre for Best Practice Management throughout the World.

=== The Middle East Quality Association (MEQA) ===
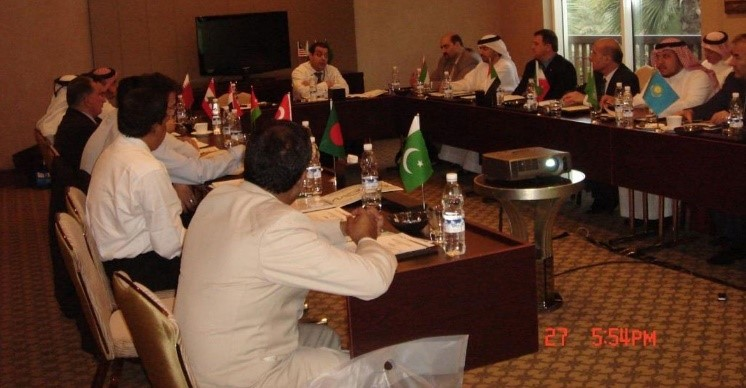
MEQA First Council Meeting

ECTQM has been the architect in the launch of the Middle East Quality Association (MEQA) with Zairi as its first President for the period of 4 years. On 27 March 2006, MEQA was officially recognised as the fifth quality hub of the world at Burj Al Arab Hotel in Dubai, paving the way for the rest of the region to achieve greater standards in quality. MEQA functions as a non-profit organization, with the main purpose being the creation of economic growth and development in the Middle East and North Africa (MENA) and facilitating the free flow of information and the exchange of the best practices in the field of quality

Several PhD and M.Phil. students both in the UK and overseas worked under the supervision of Zairi. He has successfully examined 50 Doctoral thesis, covering a wide area of subjects and tackling different aspects of Quality Management and its implementation on a global basis, with a unique contribution to the development of theory and management concepts. Over the years, he has also undertaken various externally funded research projects.

Zairi is an Emeritus Professor at the Bradford University School of Management, UK, since September 2009.

Currently, he is also the Founder of Zairi Institute, an organisation designed to disseminate the Best Management philosophy and techniques more widely.

== Co-founder of Hamdan Bin Mohammed Smart University ==
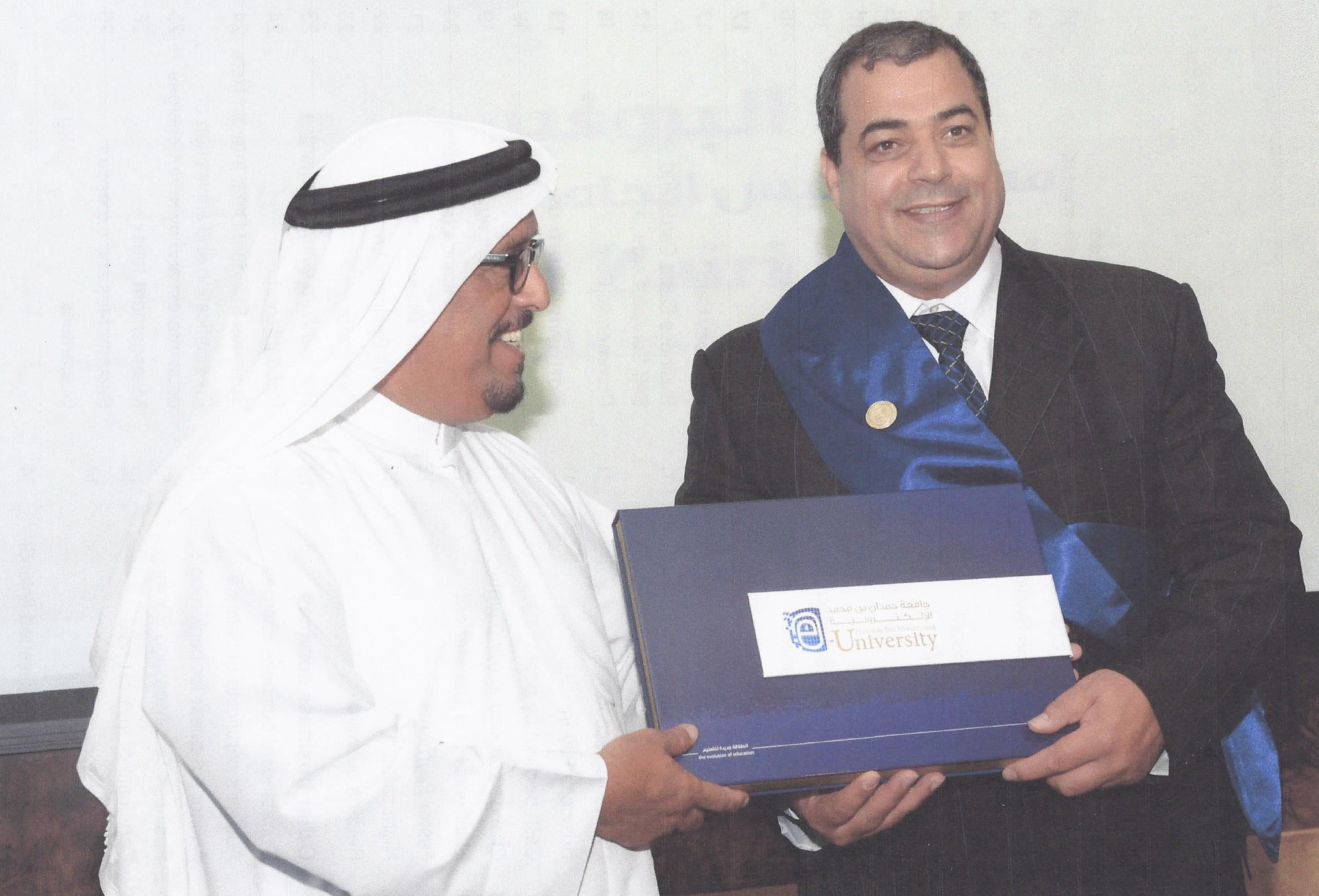
Recognition of Prof zairi's 10 years service by Hamdan Bin Mohammed Smart University

The establishment of Hamdan Bin Mohammed e-University (HBMeU) (now Hamdan Bin Mohammed Smart University (HBMSU)) started in 2001. Zairi led the Academic Vision right from the onset as a co-founder. The first milestone was the establishment of the e-TQM College, which became a global beacon for TQM. The second milestone was the launch of Hamdan Bin Mohammed e-University (HBMeU) in 2009, which later was rebranded as Hamdan Bin Mohammed Smart University (HBMSU) to reflect the latest digital technological evolution.

== Endowed chairs ==
=== SABIC Chair ===
In 1995, Zairi was appointed to the prestigious SABIC Chair in Best Practice Management at the European Centre for Total Quality Management (ECTQM), University of Bradford, UK which he held until 2004.

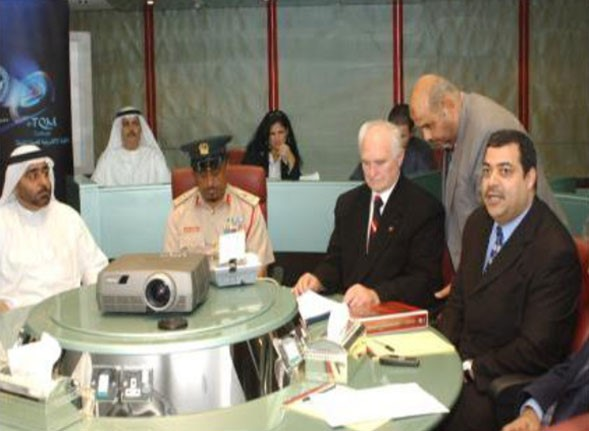
JURAN CHAIR SIGNING - (From left) Dr. Mansoor Al Awar, Lt. General Dhahi Khalfan Tamim, Dr. James Harrington and Professor Mohamed Zairi

=== JURAN Chair ===
From 2004, Zairi held the Juran Chair in Total Quality Management for 10 years.

Joseph M. Juran known as Father of Quality has contributed to this field more than any other person over a longer period. In February 2005, Zairi was honoured with an invitation from Joseph M. Juran to visit him at his home in the USA, to receive his personal congratulations.

On 2 June 2005, Zairi held the inaugural lecture for the Juran Chair in Total Quality Management.

He worked on the extension of Juran's philosophy (quality trilogy) to include internet-based business environments and the focus on customer centricity since 2004. This gradually led to the establishment of a new concept coined as Excellence Tetralogy.

== Organizational affiliations ==
- Fellow of the Chartered Management Institute
- Fellow of the Royal Society for the encouragement of Arts, Manufactures and Commerce
- Fellow of the Hong Kong Quality Management Association
- Fellow of the Chartered Quality Institute
- Fellow of the American Society for Quality

== Government sectors ==
Over the years, Zairi has guided and supported several government entities such as Saudi Standards, Metrology and Quality Org and Al Ain Municipality.

== Initiatives ==
Some initiatives that Zairi had supported include the launch and development of Regional Award Scheme, known as Excellence Yorkshire in 2000. It was intended to encourage the use of quality management principles in both public and private sector organisations operating in Yorkshire and the Humber. He was also a board member. Later, it was merged with other regional awards, which is now known as the North of England Excellence like a federation.

The launch of SME Knowledge Network in 2001, for supporting the growth and to help small and medium-sized enterprises in the UK, with the adoption of Best Practice concepts and to facilitate the sharing and transfer of useful ideas.

The setting up of Excellence in Schools Initiative in September 2002. This scheme encouraged schools to adopt the principles of quality and excellence through self-assessment and the generic model of Excellence. It was supported by Lloyds TSB who, through their Quality in Education scheme have been assisting thousands of schools throughout the country. This scheme had generated a lot of interest amongst more than 600 targeted schools and a Network of Best Practice Exchanges was established.

Zairi also assisted in the implementation of several Excellence and National Quality Award Programs.

== Publications ==
Since the late 1980s, Zairi has been prolifically contributing to the field of quality and related topics through his presence at conferences and publishing. He has published over 70 books and 400 scientific papers, most of which have been refereed and published in international journals. He has participated in the growth and development of various concepts, some of which he has been the catalyst and originator. Zairi also has contributed chapters to books and viewpoints in various professional magazines.

Some of his books, magazines and editorship journals:

- M. Zairi (1991), Total Quality Management for Engineers, Woodhead Publishing Limited, Cambridge, England. Reprint 1993 by Butterworth-Heinemann, Oxford, England, and Waltham, Massachusetts, USA. ISBN 0884151506 / ISBN 9780884151500
- M. Zairi (1992), The Management of Advanced Manufacturing Technology: Current issues and Implications, Sigma Press Ltd. Reprint 1992 by John Wiley & Sons, Malden, Massachusetts USA. ISBN 1850581312 / ISBN 9781850581314
- Zairi, M (1994), Measuring performance for business results, Chapman & Hall of London. Reprint 1994 by Springer. ISBN 0412574004 / ISBN 9780412574009
- Zairi, M & P. Leonard (1994), A complete guide to practical benchmarking: the driving force for culture change, Chapman & Hall. Reprint 1994 by Springer, ISBN 0412574101 / ISBN 9780412574108
- Zairi, M (1996), Effective Benchmarking: Learning from the Best, Chapman & Hall. ISBN 0412714906 / ISBN 9780412714900
- Zairi, Mohamed (2005). Deming and Juran: Gift to the World. Spire.
- Zairi, M (2009), Benchmarking and Performance Management: Contribution to Theory and Application, ECBPM Publishing House, Bradford, UK. ISBN 9781906993016
- Zairi, M (2009), Total Quality Management: Contributions to theory and Application, ECBPM Publishing House, Bradford, UK (ISBN 9781906993009)
- Zairi, M. (2009), Total Transformational Thinking in Academic Leadership: A New DNA, ECBPM Publishing House, Keighley, UK, (ISBN 9781906993092)
- Zairi, M. (2012), Empathy: If Quality matters why doesn't the Customer?, ECBPM Publishing House, Keighley, UK, (ISBN 9781906993276)
- Zairi, Mohamed (2012). Benchmarking for Best Practice. CRC Press. ISBN 978-0-7506-3948-4.
- M.Zairi (2013), LoE 00 Leadership of Excellence Explained; 1st edition,2013; ISBN 978-1-906993-28-3; ASIN: B07MJ3WYLR; ISBN 1793276862
- M.Zairi (2018), Deep in Crisis; Quality4.0 series, 1st edition,2018; ISBN 978-1-906993-68-9; ASIN: B07F5VLVCK; ISBN 172014382X
- M.Zairi (2018), Super Excellence; Quality4.0 series, 1st edition,2018; ISBN 978-1-906993-68-9; ASIN: B07F5W4KFL; ISBN 1726788652
- M.Zairi (2019), An Assessment Guide; Quality4.0 series, 1st edition,2019; ISBN 978-1-906993-59-7; ASIN: B07NPSLHH4; ISBN 1796815977
- Founding Editor of The International Journal of Excellence in Education (ISSN 1993-8675)
- The International Journal of Excellence in Government, 1st edition 2019; (ISSN 2516-4384)

== Recognition, awards & medals ==
Recognition, Awards & Medals
Year	Name	Presented by	For
1998	Citation of excellence	ANBAR Electronic Intelligence	Competing through modern quality principles; a forward management approach
1999	Citation of excellence	ANBAR Electronic Intelligence	BPR implementation process: an analysis of key success and failure factors
2001	Highly Commended Award	Emerald Literati Club	Social responsibility and impact on society
2002	Lifetime Achievement Award	Emerald Literati Club	Contributions to the Field of Quality and Performance Management
2003	Highly Commended Award	Emerald Literati Club	Sustaining and transferring excellence: a framework of best practice of TQM transformation based on winners of Baldrige and European Quality Awards
2005	The Ishikawa- Harrington Medal	Asian Pacific Quality Organisation (APQO)	Significant contribution in 12 Asian countries to make quality happen in this important region.
2006	The E.Jack Lancaster Medal	American Society for Quality (ASQ)	Outstanding leadership, dedication and contributions to the European Centre for TQM; Spearheading the quality management concepts in various contraries around the world; Being a pioneer in benchmarking practices in the UK; Adopting best practices in management thinking
2009	Grant Medal	American Society for Quality (ASQ)	The development of exceptionally meritorious, technologically innovative and intellectually challenging quality management education programs at Bradford University European Centre for TQM (UK) and Hamdan bin Mohamed eUniversity (UAE)
2010	Yoshio Kondo Academic Research Prize	International Academy of Quality (IAQ)	Sustained contributions to excellence through published records
2012	Recognition for being the Cofounder of Hamadan University after 10 years of service	Hamdan Bin Mohammed Smart University	For his outstanding continuous support
2013	Outstanding Contribution to Global Quality	Australian Organization for Quality (AOQ)	Quality for contributions in global quality
2017	SQC Award	KSA Saudi Quality Council (SQC)	As a keynote speaker at SQC annual event
2019	10 years of supporting Sheikh Khalifa Government Excellence Program	Sheikh Khalifa Government Excellence Program	In recognition of his ten years supporting Sheikh Khalifa Government Excellence Program
2019	Award of Honorary Distinguished Editor	Emerald Group	In recognition and appreciation for his long-standing contribution to scientific developments across multiple disciplines as founding editor, reviewer and author for numerous publications.
