= Oueid Khenig-Roum bombing =

2021 al-Qaeda attack in Algeria

- Part of Islamist insurgency in the Sahel
- Location: Oueid Khenig-Roum, Telidjane District, Tebessa Province, Algeria
- Date: January 14, 2021
- Target: Algerian soldiers
- Deaths: 5 civilians killed
- Injuries: 3 injured
- Perpetrator: AQIM

On January 14, 2021, five people were killed by a bomb placed by Al-Qaeda in the Islamic Maghreb in Oueid Khenig-Roum, near Telidjane, Tébessa Province, Algeria.

== Background ==
Following the end of the Algerian Civil War, the Salafist Group for Preaching and Combat, the predecessor to Al-Qaeda in the Islamic Maghreb (AQIM), launched limited incursions and bombings into Algerian territory as it consolidated power in Mali, Niger, and Mauritania. Many of these attacks targeted Algerian soldiers. In December 2020, a shootout in Jijel Province killed an Algerian officer and three AQIM jihadists. At the beginning of January 2021, clashes between Algerian soldiers and AQIM killed three soldiers and six fighters.

== Bombing ==
The bombing occurred on January 14 when a civilian car drove over a homemade landmine on a road in the rural Oueid Khenig-Roum region of Tebessa. The drivers were hunters from Bir el Ater, and were on their way to a hunting area. Five civilians were killed and three others were wounded in the explosion. In the statement released by the Algerian Ministry of Defense announcing the bombing, Algerian authorities also stated that a shootout several hours later between Algerian authorities and a jihadist in Khenchela Province killed the jihadist. The jihadist killed was monitoring the area to scope out locations for a jihadist attack.

The bombing at Oueid Khenig-Roum was the deadliest attack on civilians in Algeria in several years. The bombing was also the first civilian vehicle bombing by jihadists in Algeria in ten years. Al-Qaeda claimed responsibility for the attack but stated they did not intend to kill civilians. Egypt condemned the bombing in a statement released on January 15.
