= Ouenza =

Coordinates: 35°57′N 8°08′E

Ouenza الونزة
- City and Commune
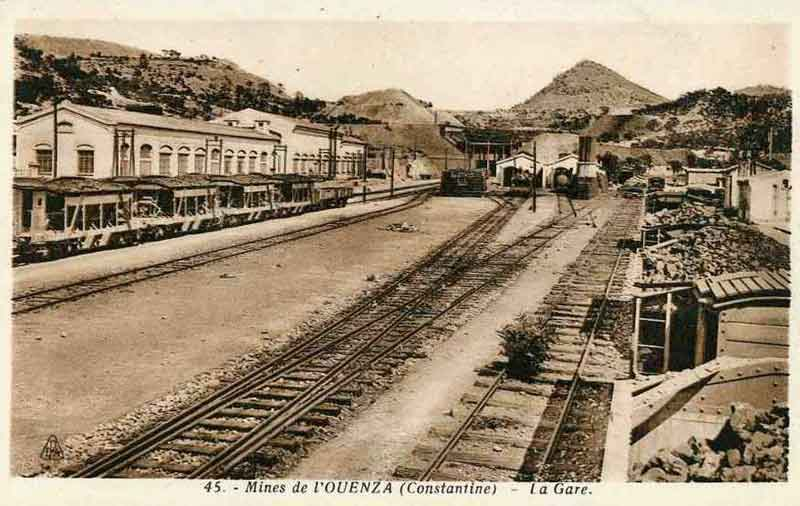
- Ouenza's train station

- Location of Taher in the Tébessa Province
- Country: Algeria
- Province: Tébessa Province
- District: Ouenza District
- APC: 2012-2017

Government
  - Type: Municipality
  - Mayor: Omar Ifroujen (RND)

Area
  - Total: 48 sq mi (124 km^{2})

Population (2008)
  - Total: 52,737
- Time zone: UTC+1 (CET)
- Postal code: 12350; 12003
- ISO 3166 code: CP

Ouenza (Arabic: الونزة) is a town in Tébessa Province, in far eastern Algeria; near the border with Tunisia; 43 km south of Souk Ahras, and west of M'Daourouch.

== Demographics ==
The population is 52,000. Ethnologically, the city draws its population from the diverse surrounding regions, including Souk Ahras, Taoura, Annaba, Guelma, Tebessa, Chréa, El-meridj, Ain Zerga, Meskiana and others.

== Life in Ouenza ==
Ouenza was built by the French Société de l'Ouenza at the start of the 20th century, to exploit the iron ore deposits that have been the basis of economic growth in the region for over 100 years. Originally, workers from Morocco, Tunisia, Libya and other regions of Algeria came to Ouenza, contributing to its cultural diversity and making the town unique in the region. But once these workers retired and returned home with their families, they were replaced by inhabitants of Ouenza's neighbouring villages.

Ouenza's location brings it a dry climate, with hot summers and cold winters. The majority of the inhabitants leave for coastal towns such as Annaba and el Kala during the summer season.

Ouenza has a number of locations very popular with its inhabitants. One of these, the suq, is known by its colonial name, SAS. People of all ages gather at the boulodrome, named "le Cercle", to watch the game of pétanque. The main supermarket is named "L'économat". There is also a village hall with a 400-seat cinema and air conditioning. There are also three tennis courts and the football field of the local team OSO. Recently a number of cybercafes have emerged, catering for the tastes of the young people.

== See also ==
- Iron ore in Africa
