= Cheria District =

Coordinates: 35.2704°N 7.7520°E

Cheria District Cheria
- District
- Country: Algeria
- Province: Tébessa Province
- Time zone: UTC+1 (CET)
- 12002: 12002
- Area code: 37

Cheria District is a district of Tébessa Province, Algeria.

The district is further divided into 2 municipalities:

- Cheria
- Tlidjene
