= Negrine District =

Coordinates: 34.4857°N 7.5205°E

- District
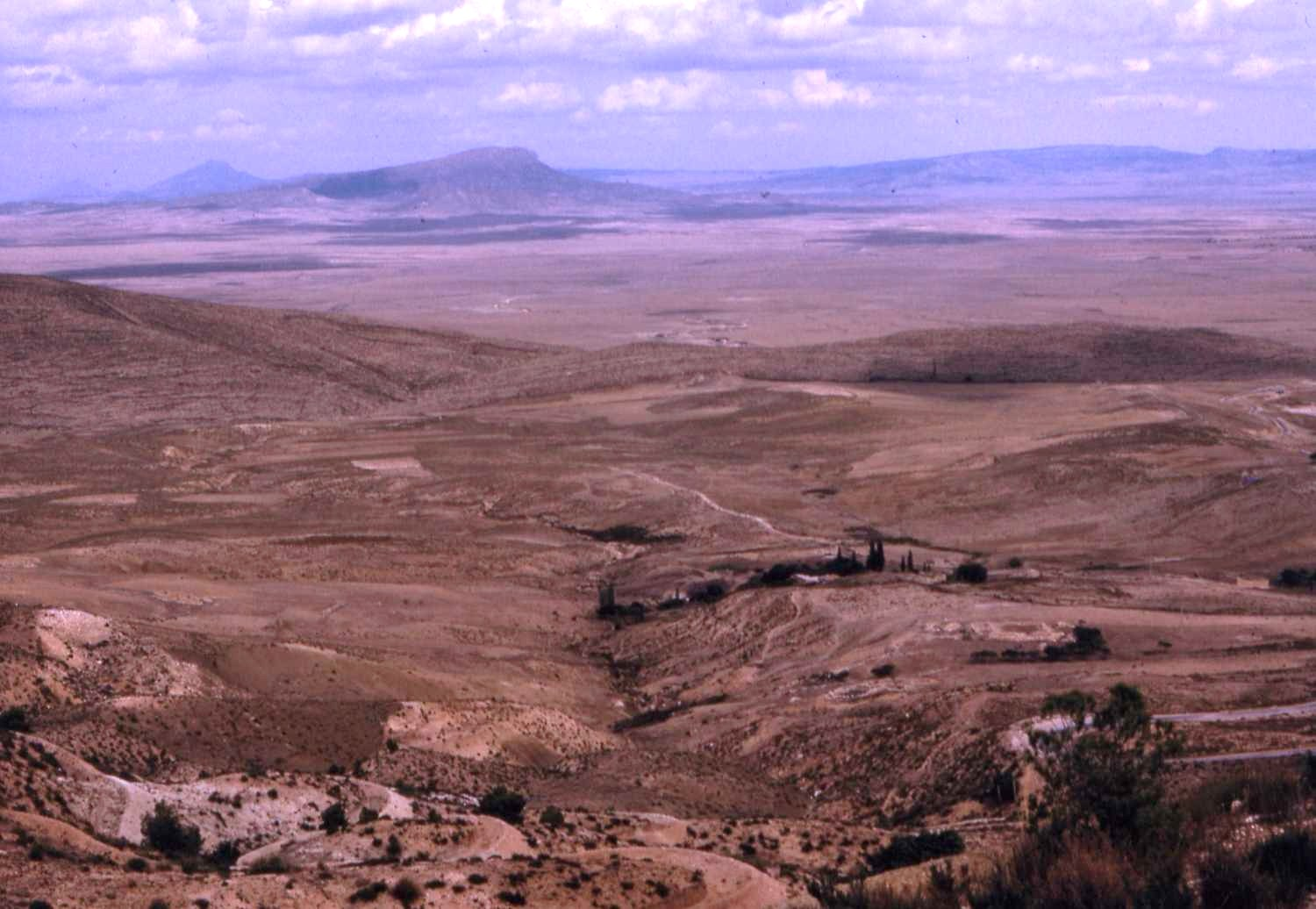
- Negrine area
- Interactive map of Negrine District
- Country: Algeria
- Province: Tébessa Province

Area
  - Total: 968 sq mi (2,507 km^{2})
- Elevation: 1,024 ft (312 m)
  - Density: 15/sq mi (5.9/km^{2})
- Time zone: UTC+1 (CET)

Negrine District is a district of Tébessa Province, Algeria. The district population in 1998 was 14815 inhabitants and has an elevation of 321m above sea level and is located near the Chott el Ghasa.

The district is further divided into 2 municipalities:

- Negrine
- Ferkane
