= Thala, Tunisia =

Thala Tāla تالة
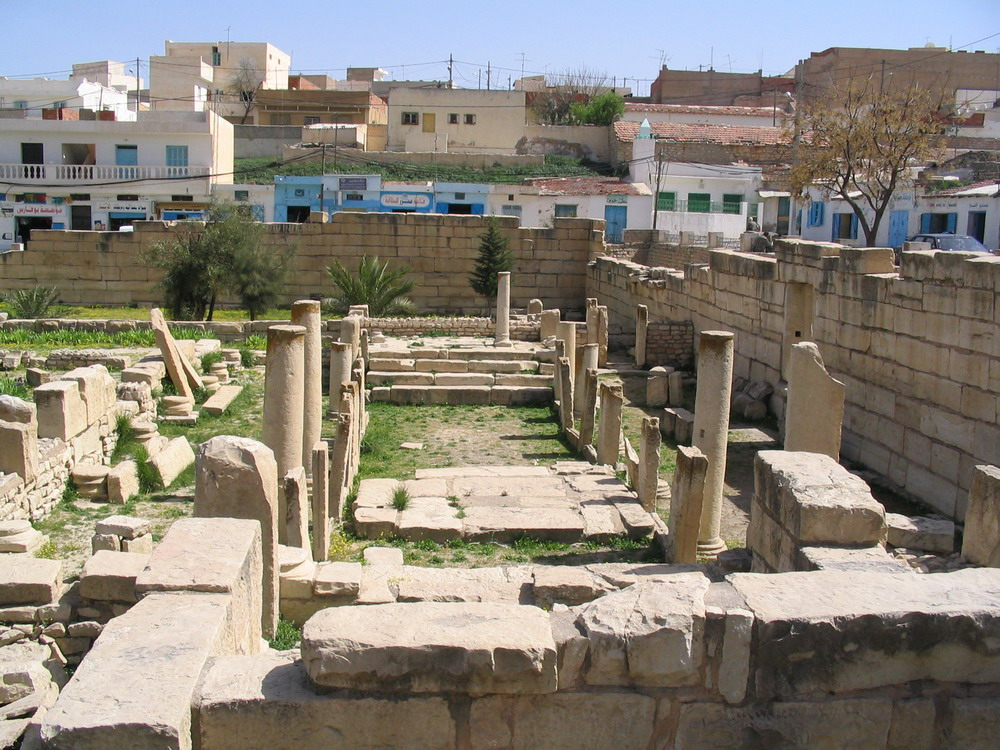
- Ruins at Thala

- Location in Tunisia
- Coordinates: 35°34′N 8°40′E
- Country: Tunisia
- Governorate: Kasserine Governorate

Government
  - Mayor: Abdelmagid Hayouni (Independent)
- Elevation: 1,017 m (3,337 ft)

Population (2014)
  - Total: 18,230

Thala (Arabic: تالة, romanized: Tāla) is a town and commune in Tunisia. It is located in the Kasserine Governorate since 1956. As of the 2004 census it had 13,968 inhabitants. The altitude of Thala is 1,017 metres (3,337 ft), which makes it the highest and the coldest town in the country.

== History ==
During the Roman Empire Thala was the site of a Roman settlement and was the seat of an ancient bishopric. It still has a titular absentee bishop (currently the auxiliary Bishop of Sydney, Richard Umbers), who is appointed by the Pope.

In 1906, an attack by local bedouin on the French civil administration offices during the Thala-Kasserine Disturbances was the first violent resistance to French authority under the protectorate.

Thala was the scene of fierce fighting during World War II, in the late stages of the Battle of the Kasserine Pass. The 10th Panzer Division sought to exploit its early success against US forces. In a series of defensive actions on 21 February 1943, the British 26th Armoured Brigade, part of Nickforce, and the divisional artillery of the U.S. 9th infantry Division, arriving after an 800-mile forced march, blocked an advance by the German division's Kampfgruppe which, despite coming under the personal command of Erwin Rommel, were finally unable to make headway through fire from British tanks and artillery.

== Geography ==
=== Climate ===
The climate in Thala is cold semi-arid (BSk, according to the Köppen climate classification), with Mediterranean influences. Summers are moderately hot (by Saharan standards) and dry, and winters are chilly and wetter. Snowfalls can occur seldom.

Climate data for Thala, Tunisia (1981–2010 normals, extremes 1976–2017)
Month	Jan	Feb	Mar	Apr	May	Jun	Jul	Aug	Sep	Oct	Nov	Dec	Year
Record high °C (°F)	21.2 (70.2)	27.5 (81.5)	29.9 (85.8)	30.9 (87.6)	38.2 (100.8)	39.3 (102.7)	41.0 (105.8)	40.6 (105.1)	39.1 (102.4)	33.6 (92.5)	27.1 (80.8)	24.8 (76.6)	41.0 (105.8)
Mean daily maximum °C (°F)	9.2 (48.6)	10.6 (51.1)	13.7 (56.7)	17.2 (63.0)	22.8 (73.0)	28.4 (83.1)	32.0 (89.6)	31.4 (88.5)	26.1 (79.0)	21.1 (70.0)	14.6 (58.3)	10.4 (50.7)	19.8 (67.6)
Daily mean °C (°F)	5.5 (41.9)	6.3 (43.3)	8.8 (47.8)	11.6 (52.9)	16.5 (61.7)	21.4 (70.5)	24.8 (76.6)	24.4 (75.9)	19.9 (67.8)	16.0 (60.8)	10.5 (50.9)	6.9 (44.4)	14.4 (57.9)
Mean daily minimum °C (°F)	2.5 (36.5)	2.7 (36.9)	4.5 (40.1)	6.6 (43.9)	10.8 (51.4)	15.1 (59.2)	18.3 (64.9)	18.4 (65.1)	15.0 (59.0)	11.8 (53.2)	7.0 (44.6)	3.8 (38.8)	9.7 (49.5)
Record low °C (°F)	−8.4 (16.9)	−6.9 (19.6)	−3.2 (26.2)	−2.5 (27.5)	0.4 (32.7)	4.9 (40.8)	6.9 (44.4)	9.5 (49.1)	6.3 (43.3)	1.8 (35.2)	−2.9 (26.8)	−4.6 (23.7)	−8.4 (16.9)
Average precipitation mm (inches)	41.9 (1.65)	28.1 (1.11)	46.0 (1.81)	42.9 (1.69)	43.6 (1.72)	31.1 (1.22)	10.9 (0.43)	25.5 (1.00)	42.4 (1.67)	32.2 (1.27)	43.4 (1.71)	39.6 (1.56)	427.6 (16.84)
Average precipitation days (≥ 1.0 mm)	6.5	5.4	7.0	6.7	5.5	3.6	1.5	3.8	5.4	5.0	5.6	5.4	61.4
Average relative humidity (%)	74	70	71	67	63	55	47	52	60	67	73	73	64
Mean monthly sunshine hours	161.7	170.4	209.8	224.5	275.4	304.1	343.7	306.2	237.2	211.9	176.5	155.8	2,777.2
Percentage possible sunshine	53	57	57	58	64	71	78	74	65	62	58	52	63
Source: Institut National de la Météorologie (precipitation days and humidity 1961–1990) (Note: The Station ID for Thala is 64646311.)
