= Bir Dheb =

- Commune and town
- Location within Algeria
- Coordinates: 35°31′29″N 7°56′18″E
- Country: Algeria
- Province: Tébessa Province
- District: Morsott District

Population (2008)
  - Total: 7,181
- Time zone: UTC+1 (CET)

Bir Dheb is a town and commune in Tébessa Province, Algeria.
