= Al-Qaeda in the Islamic Maghreb =

Islamist militant organization in Northwest Africa and the Sahel

- تنظيم القاعدة في بلاد المغرب الإسلامي
- The black flag variant used by AQIM
- Leader: Yazid Mubarak
- Dates active: 2007–present
- Groups: Uqba ibn Nafi Brigade (until 2017); Sahara Emirate Brigade (until 2017); Al-Mourabitoun Battalion (2015-2017)
- Active regions: The Maghreb and the Sahel: Primarily across Northern and Southern Algeria, Mali, Libya, Niger and Mauritania
- Ideology: Salafist jihadism
- Size: 3,000–10,000 (2007–2014); 5,000 in Libya (2018 estimate)
- Part of: Al-Qaeda
- Wars: Insurgency in the Maghreb (2002–present) and the Global War on Terrorism

Al-Qaeda in the Lands of the Islamic Maghreb (Arabic: تنظيم القاعدة في بلاد المغرب الإسلامي, romanized: Tanẓīm al-Qā'idah fī Bilād al-Maghrib al-Islāmī, French: l'Organisation d'Al-Qaïda aux Pays du Maghreb Islamique), or AQIM, is a Salafi-jihadist militant organization (of al-Qaeda) active in North Africa engaged in an insurgency campaign in the Maghreb and Sahel regions.

The militant group originated from the Salafist Group for Preaching and Combat (GSPC). It has declared its intention to attack Western targets. The group has been designated a terrorist organization by the United Nations, Australia, Canada, Malaysia, Russia, the United Arab Emirates, the United Kingdom and the United States.

Membership is mostly drawn from the Algerian and local Saharan communities (such as the Tuaregs and Berabiche tribal clans of Mali), as well from other North African countries AQIM has focused on kidnapping for ransom as a means of raising funds and is estimated to have raised more than $50 million in the last decade.

On 2 March 2017, the Sahara branch of AQIM merged with Macina Liberation Front, Ansar Dine, and al-Mourabitoun, into Jama'at Nasr al-Islam wal Muslimin.

== Name ==
The group's official name is Organization of al-Qa'eda in the Land of the Islamic Maghreb (Qaedat al-Jihad fi Bilad al-Maghrib al-Islami), often shortened to Al-Qaeda in the Islamic Maghreb (AQIM, from French al-Qaïda au Maghreb islamique, AQMI). Prior to January 2007 it was known as the Salafist Group for Preaching and Combat (Arabic: الجماعة السلفية للدعوة والقتال al-Jamā'ah as-Salafiyyah lid-Da'wah wal-Qiṭāl) and the French acronym GSPC (Groupe Salafiste pour la Prédication et le Combat).

== History ==
AQIM fighters in a 2015 propaganda video, filmed in the Sahara Desert.

In January 2007, the GSPC announced that it would now operate under the name of Al-Qaeda in the Islamic Maghreb (AQIM).

On 19 January 2009, the UK newspaper The Sun claimed that there had been an outbreak of bubonic plague at an AQIM training camp in the Tizi Ouzou province in Algeria. The Washington Times, in an article based on a senior U.S. intelligence official source, claimed a day later that the incident was not related to bubonic plague, but was an accident involving either a biological or chemical agent.

Al Qaeda in the Islamic Maghreb is one of the region's wealthiest, best-armed militant groups due to the payment of ransom demands by humanitarian organizations and Western governments. It is reported that 90 per cent of AQIM resources come from ransoms paid in return for the release of hostages. Omar Ould Hamaha said:

The source of our financing is the Western countries. They are paying for jihad.

In December 2012, one of AQIM's top commanders, Mokhtar Belmokhtar, split off from AQIM and took his fighters with him, executing the In Amenas hostage crisis in Algeria weeks later, just after France launched Operation Serval in Mali. Belmokhtar later claimed he acted on behalf of Al Qaeda. In December 2015, Belmokhtar's splinter group, Al-Mourabitoun rejoined AQIM, according to audio statements released by both groups.

A top commander of AQIM, Abdelhamid Abou Zeid, was reported killed by French and Chadian forces in northern Mali on 25 February 2013. This was confirmed by AQIM in June 2013.

=== Alleged prejudice ===
The United States National Counterterrorism Center stated that AQIM had a reputation for holding cultural and racial insensitivities towards Sub-Saharan Africans. The NCTC maintained that some recruits "claimed that AQIM was clearly racist against some black members from West Africa because they were only sent against lower-level targets." The bulletin goes on to say that former AQIM commander Mokhtar Belmokhtar in August 2009 stated, "he wanted to attract black African recruits because they would agree more readily than Arabs to becoming suicide bombers and because poor economic and social conditions made them ripe for recruitment."

By 2016, AQIM had reportedly recruited large numbers of young sub-Saharan Africans, with attacks like the 2016 Grand-Bassam shootings in Ivory Coast being carried out by black AQIM members. AQIM commander Yahya Abou El-Hammam, in an interview with a Mauritanian website, was quoted as saying "Today, the mujahideen have built up brigades and battalions with sons of the region, our black brothers, Peuls, Bambaras and Songhai".

== Leadership ==
Key leaders and operatives of this group included Yahya Abu El Hammam, who served as a senior leader of al-Qaeda in the Islamic Maghreb (AQIM), planning operations and kidnapping Westerners in North and West Africa. He was wanted by the US Rewards for Justice Program with a $5 million bounty for his arrest. Hammam played a key role in perpetuating AQIM's terrorist activities in West Africa and Mali, and participated in several AQIM terrorist attacks in Mauritania. In December 2013, Yahya Abu Hammam gave an interview to al-Jazeera in which he threatened France's military intervention in the Sahara would open "the gates of hell for the French people".

In July 2010, Hammam was reportedly involved in the killing of a seventy-eight-year-old French hostage in Niger. In 2006, Hammam was sentenced to death in absentia by Algerian authorities for terrorism-related charges. Hammam was killed by French forces in February 2019.

== International links ==
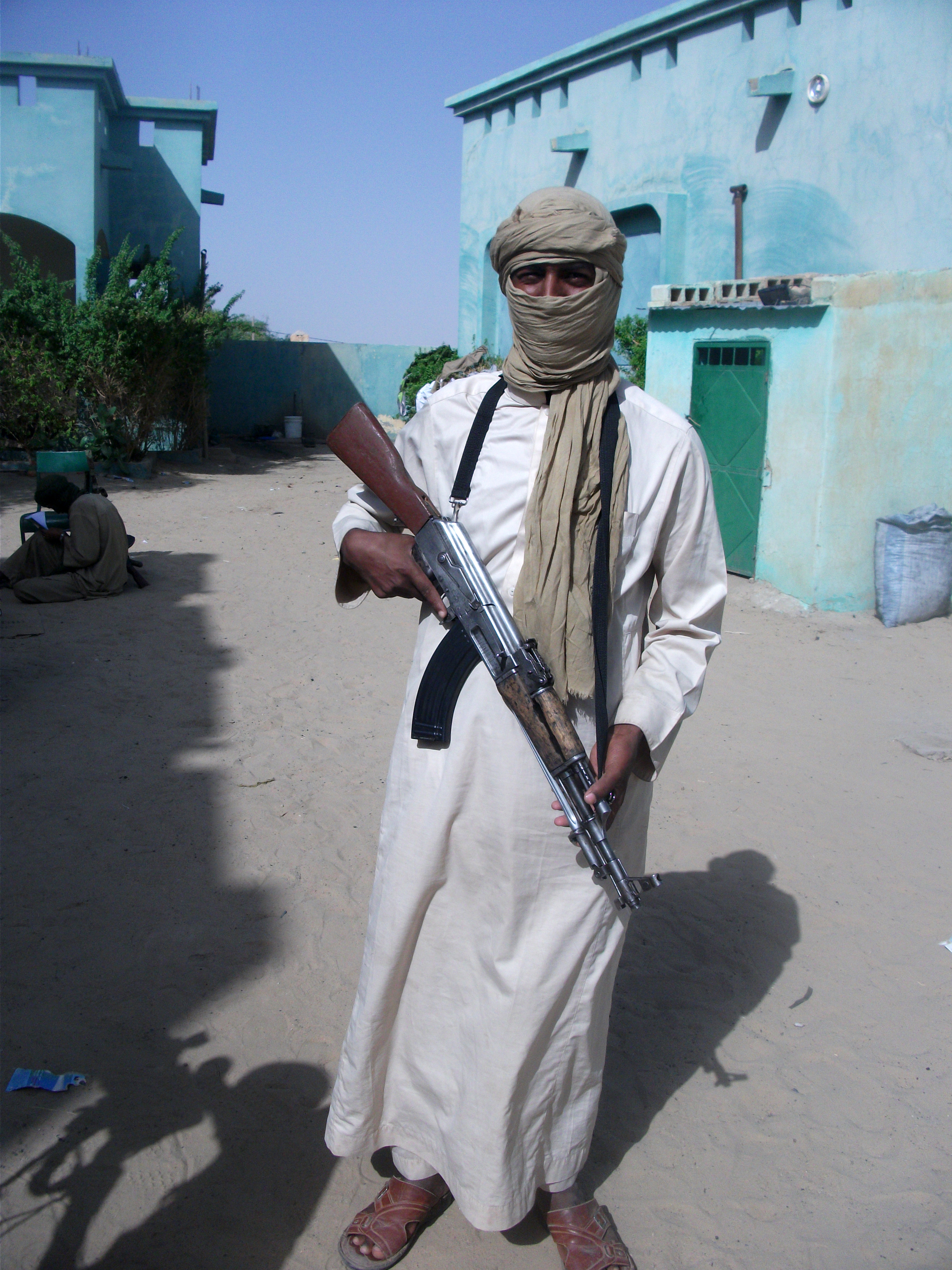
AQIM Tuareg militant in Sahel, December 2012.

Allegations of the former GSPCs links to al-Qaeda predated the September 11 attacks. As followers of a Qutbist strand of Salafist jihadism, the members of the GSPC were thought to share al-Qaeda's general ideological outlook. After the deposition of Hassan Hattab, various leaders of the group pledged allegiance to al-Qaeda.

In November 2007, Nigerian authorities arrested five men for alleged possession of seven sticks of dynamite and other explosives. Nigerian prosecutors alleged that three of the accused had trained for two years with the then Salafist Group for Preaching and Combat in Algeria.

In late 2011, the splinter group Movement for Oneness and Jihad in West Africa was founded in order to spread jihadi activities further into West Africa. Their military leader is Omar Ould Hamaha, a former AQIM fighter.

According to U.S. Army General Carter Ham, Al-Qaeda in the Islamic Maghreb, the Somalia-based Al-Shabaab, and the Nigeria-based Boko Haram were as of June 2012 attempting to synchronize and coordinate their activities in terms of sharing funds, training and explosives. Ham added that he believed that the collaboration presented a threat to both U.S. homeland security and the local authorities. However, according to counter-terrorism specialist Rick Nelson with the Washington-based Center for Strategic International Studies, there was little evidence that the three groups were targeting U.S. areas, as each was primarily interested in establishing fundamentalist administrations in their respective regions.

In a 2013 Al Jazeera interview in Timbuktu, AQIM commander Talha claimed that his movement went to Niger, Algeria, Burkina Faso and Nigeria, to organize cells of AQIM. He explained their strategy: "There are many people who have nothing, and you can reach them by the word of God, or by helping them."

== Statements ==
Al Qaeda in the Islamic Maghreb operates a media outlet known as Al-Andalus, which regularly releases propaganda videos showing AQIM operations, hostages, and statements from members.

According to London-based risk analysis firm Stirling Assynt, AQIM issued a call for vengeance against Beijing for mistreatment of its Muslim minority following the July 2009 Ürümqi riots.

AQIM voiced support for demonstrations against the Tunisian and Algerian Governments in a video released on 13 January 2011. Al Qaeda offered military aid and training to the demonstrators, calling on them to overthrow "the corrupt, criminal and tyrannical" regime, calling for "retaliation" against the Tunisian government, and also calling for the overthrow of Algerian President Abdelaziz Bouteflika.

AQIM leader Abu Musab Abdul Wadud appeared in the video, calling for Islamic sharia law to be established in Tunisia. Al Qaeda has begun recruiting anti-government demonstrators, some of whom have previously fought against American forces in Iraq and Israeli forces in Gaza.

AQIM endorsed efforts in Libya to topple the regime of Colonel Muammar Gaddafi, though it remains unclear how many fighters in Libya are loyal to al-Qaeda, or members of it. Gaddafi seized on the expression of support and help for the rebel movement to blame al-Qaeda for fomenting the uprising.

== Timeline of attacks ==
=== 2007–09 ===
- 11 April 2007: Two car bombs were detonated by the group. One was close to the Prime Minister's office in Algiers and the blast killed more than 30 people and wounded more than 150.
- February 2008: Two Austrians were captured in Tunisia and taken via Algeria to Mali and freed later that year, the kidnappings were attributed to Al-Qaeda in the Islamic Maghreb
- December 2008: Two Canadian diplomats were taken hostage along with their driver in south-western Niger while on official UN mission to resolve a crisis in northern Niger. The driver was freed in March 2009. The diplomats were freed in April 2009. The kidnappings were attributed to Al-Qaeda in the Islamic Maghreb.
- 22 January 2009: Four Westerners were kidnapped while visiting the Andéramboukane festival in Niger near the border with Mali. AQIM demanded the British government release Abu Qatada, and on 31 May 2009 a statement was released claiming Edwyn Dyer had been executed, which was confirmed by the British Prime Minister Gordon Brown on 3 June 2009. All of the other tourists were eventually released.
- 30 July 2009: At least 11 Algerian soldiers are killed in an ambush while escorting a military convoy outside the coastal town of Damous, near Tipaza.

=== 2010–12 ===
- March 2010: An Italian national, Sergio Cicala, and his wife are held hostage. They were released on 16 April 2010.
- 16 September 2010: Seven employees from Areva and Vinci are kidnapped in Arlit, Niger (five French, one Togolese and one Malagasy). The capture was claimed on 21 September by AQIM in a communiqué published in Al Jazeera. Three of the hostages were released on 24 February 2011. The other four were released on 28 October 2013.
- 25 November 2011: Three Western tourists were abducted in Timbuktu: Sjaak Rijke from the Netherlands, Johan Gustafsson from Sweden and Stephen Malcolm McGown from South Africa. A fourth tourist, from Germany, was killed when he refused to cooperate with the perpetrators. Rijke was rescued in April 2015. Gustafsson was released in June 2017. McGown was released in July 2017.
- 9 December 2011: AQIM published two photos, showing five kidnapped persons of European descent including the three tourists abducted in Timbuktu. French hostage Philippe Verdon was killed in March 2013. His body was found in July 2013. French hostage Serge Lazarevic was released on 9 December 2013.

=== 2013–2015 ===
- 30 September 2013: AQIM claimed responsibility for a suicide car bombing in Timbuktu that killed at least two civilians.
- 20 November 2015: AQIM and Al-Mourabitoun attacked a hotel in Bamako, Mali. They took more than 100 persons hostage, killing 19 before the siege was ended by security forces.

=== 2016–2018 ===
- 8 January 2016: Gunmen kidnapped Swiss nun Beatrice Stockly in Timbuktu, Mali. AQIM claimed responsibility for the kidnapping a month later and released a video in January 2017 showing Stockly still alive. Stockly was killed in September 2020.
- 15 January 2016: AQIM gunmen attacked the Cappuccino and Splendid Hotel in Ouagadougou, killing at least 28 people, wounding at least 56 and taking a total of 126 hostages. 200 km to the north, Australian couple Ken and Jocelyn Elliott, medical doctors, were kidnapped. Jocelyn was released a few days later due to guidance from al Qaeda leaders, as mentioned in a recording released by AQIM (in which AQIM takes responsibility for the kidnapping). Ken was released in May 2023.
- 13 March 2016: AQIM attacked the town of Grand-Bassam, in the Ivory Coast, killing at least 16 people, including 2 soldiers, and 4 European tourists. 6 assailants were also killed.
- 1 July 2018: A suicide bomber drove a vehicle loaded with explosives into an army patrol and detonated it in the Malian city of Gao. Four civilians were killed and 31 others, including four French soldiers, were wounded in the attack. AQIM claimed responsibility for the attack.
- 8 July 2018: The Uqba bin Nafi Battalion, the Tunisian wing of AQIM, claimed responsibility for an attack which killed six Tunisian policemen in Ghardimaou, Jendouba Governorate.

=== 2019–present ===
- 20 January 2019: AQIM claims the attack on 10 UN Mali peacekeepers due to Chad's restoration of relations with Israel.
- 26 April 2019: A Tunisian Army soldier was killed and three were injured in an IED attack in Chaambi Mountains National Park, north-western Tunisia. AQIM claimed the attack was undertaken by militants from its Uqba bin Nafi Battalion.
- On 20 June 2020, militants ambushed an Algerian Army detachment in Ain Defla, northern Algeria, killing one soldier. An al-Qa’ida-aligned media agency claimed that AQIM was responsible for the attack.
- On 27 June 2020, two Algerian Army personnel were killed by an improvised explosive device (IED) in Ain Dalia, northern Algeria. An al-Qa’ida-aligned media agency claimed that AQIM was responsible for the attack.
- On January 14, 2021, five people were killed in the Oueid Khenig-Roum bombing.
- On 25 to 26 February 2022, France anti-jihadist military forces conducted an operation in Mali which resulted in the death of Yahia Djouadi, AQIM's leader for financing and logistics and former "emir" of the group's Libyan operations.
- On 2 August 2024, the al-Qaeda affiliate in West Africa's Sahel region took two Russian citizens hostage in Niger, as shown in a video released by Jama'a Nusrat ul-Islam wa al-Muslimin (JNIM). The captives, identified as Yuri and Greg, were working for a Russian company in the gold-rich Tillaberi region.

== See also ==
- List of designated terrorist groups
- Insurgency in the Maghreb (2002–present)
- Jund al-Khilafah
