= Bekkaria =

- Commune and town
- Location within Algeria
- Coordinates: 35°22′20″N 8°14′32″E
- Country: Algeria
- Province: Tébessa Province
- District: El Kouif District

Population (2008)
  - Total: 9,917
- Time zone: UTC+1 (CET)

Bekkaria is a town and commune in Tébessa Province, Algeria.
