= Stah Guentis =

Stah Guentis سطح قنطيس
- Commune and town
- Nickname: Ar

- Location within Algeria
- Coordinates: 34.9984°N 7.30829°E
- Country: Algeria
- Province: Tébessa Province
- District: El Ogla District

Area
  - Total: 434 sq mi (1,124 km^{2})

Population (2008)
  - Total: 3,689
- Time zone: UTC+1 (CET)

Stah Guentis is a town and commune in Tébessa Province in north-eastern Algeria.
