= Nemencha =

North African tribal confederation

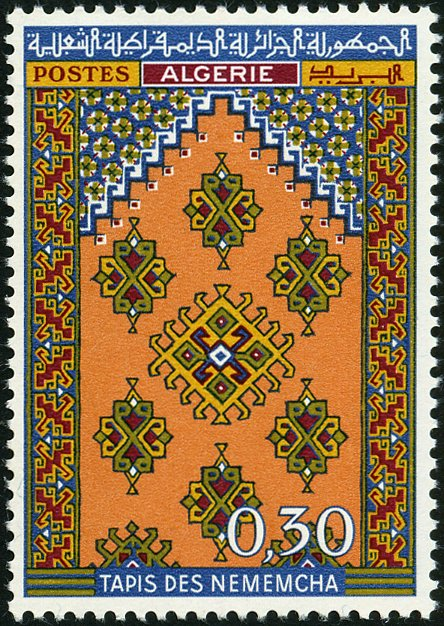
Traditional Nemencha rug

The Nemencha or Nmemcha or ⴰⵀ ⵏⵎⵎⵓⵛ (Ah Nemmuš) are a large tribal confederation of Berbers inhabiting North Africa. They are composed of three clans: Alawna (العلاونة), Awlad Rashashh (أولاد رشاش), al-Bararsheh (البرارشة). They live in a territory in Algeria that bears their name, the Nemencha Mountains. The Nemencha are also the neighbors of the Berber tribes of Fraichiches, Kasserine, and Hammema Gafsa.

== History ==
The Nemencha Mountains host significant prehistoric sites, including two from the Paleolithic period: an Acheulean site at El Ma El Biodh and the Aterian site at Bir El Ater, the latter being the city for which the Aterian culture is named.

Damous el-Ahmar stands as the only robust reference site for the Nemencha region. It is uniquely capable of providing the major elements for reconstructing behavioral patterns comparable to those of the Aurès Mountains.The establishment of generations of pastoralists in their summer mountain residences within the vast rock shelters (Damous) of Djebel Anoual (at 1400–1500 m altitude) marks a distinct shift from the discomfort and unpredictability of open-air Capsian campsites.

All archaeological materials have been well-preserved at this high-altitude, sheltered location, and they are both typical and well-suited for providing evidence for socio-economic reconstruction.Analysis of the formal burials at the site has established that these communities were Mechtoid groups who resided there seasonally (spring and autumn) with their herds of sheep, goats, and cattle. The choice of this mountainous territory in the Nemencha, which occurred during the 5th-6th millennium cal BC, appears to have been later than the settlement at the Capeletti Cave (Aurès) in the 7th millennium cal BC, and appears contemporaneous with the third occupational phase at Capeletti.

The Nemencha confederation moved seasonally between the Tebessa region in the north and the Souf valley in the south, following the cycles of a pastoral-agricultural economy. Their refusal to pay the Kharaj tax to the Ottoman authorities further reinforced their shift towards a nomadic lifestyle and their stance as opponents of central power. The very emergence of the Nemencha as a distinct confederation appears to be linked to the Ottoman period. This transition to pastoral nomadism was a decisive factor in their Arabization, strengthening their ties with neighboring Arab-Bedouin tribes, such as the Ouled Abid to the south.

Nomadic and pastoral lifestyles in the region predated the Ottomans, existing under the Hafsids, Almohads, and even Zirids. As noted by Ibn Khaldun, Hawwara tribes had already adopted this "Arabized" way of life due to their proximity to Arab tribes in the plains.

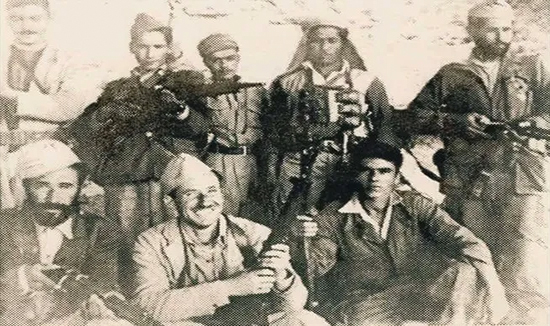
Leaders of Aurès-Nemencha (1954–1957)

From the 18th century onward, the Nemencha were able to assert their dominance over a vast territory stretching from Jebel Cherich (Aures) to the Jerid, and from Tebessa to Souf. As the de facto rulers of the region throughout the Ottoman era, they posed a major obstacle to French expansion, mounting a long and determined resistance. French forces only managed to gain full control of the city of Tebessa in 1851.

Furthermore, the Nemencha were among the first to join the Algerian War of Independence, to the extent that the historic first military region (Wilaya I) was named "Aurès-Nemencha."
