= Muqaddimah (disambiguation) =

Muqaddimah is and early Islamic treatise on world history by Ibn Khaldun.

Muqaddimah (مقدمة) or Mukadimah (meaning "Prologue" or "The Introduction") may also refer to:

- Muqaddimah Ibn al-Salah (Introduction to the Science of Hadith), early treatise on hadith science
- Muqaddimah Al-Ajurrumiya, famous treatise on Arabic grammar
- Mukadimah UUD '45, preamble of the Constitution of Indonesia

== See also ==
- Prolegomena (disambiguation)
- Muqaddam (disambiguation)
- Muqadama, a 1996 Indian action-drama film by K. C. Bokadia
