= Tala Hamza mine =

Lead and zinc mine in Algeria

- Location: Algeria
- Products: Lead, Zinc

The Tala Hamza mine is the largest lead and zinc mine in Algeria. The mine is located in northern Algeria. The mine has reserves amounting to 68.6 million tonnes of ore grading 1.1% lead and 4.6% zinc thus resulting 0.75 million tonnes of lead and 3.15 million tonnes of zinc.

== See also ==
- List of mines in Algeria
