= Bedjene =

- Commune and town
- Location within Algeria
- Coordinates: 35°20′56″N 7°28′18″E
- Country: Algeria
- Province: Tébessa Province
- District: El Ogla District

Population (2008)
  - Total: 4,505
- Time zone: UTC+1 (CET)

Bedjene is a town and commune in Tébessa Province, Algeria.
