= Betita mine =

Phosphate mine in Algeria

- Location: Tébessa Province, Algeria
- Products: Phosphates

The Betita mine is a large mine located in Tébessa Province. Betita represents one of the largest phosphates reserve in Algeria having estimated reserves of 175 million tonnes of ore grading 18% P_{2}O_{5}.
