= Moghaddam =

Moghaddam or Moghadam (Persian: مقدم: "first", "preceding"); is a Persian language surname which in both of its Latin transcriptions of the Perso-Arabic alphabet is also common among the Iranian diaspora.

Notable people with the surname include:

== Moghaddam ==
- Afshin Moghaddam (1945–1976), Iranian singer
- Assaf Moghadam, American academic, also active in Israel
- Bita Moghaddam, neuroscientist
- Esmail Ahmadi-Moghaddam (born 1961), Iranian military officer
- Fathali M. Moghaddam, Iranian psychologist
- Gholamreza Mesbahi-Moghaddam (born 1951), Iranian politician
- Hamid Moghaddam (born 1956), Iranian-born American business executive and philanthropist
- Hassan Tehrani Moghaddam (1959–2011), Iranian engineer and military officer
- Hurie Moghadam (born 1997), Iranian actress, writer and director.
- Mahbod Moghadam (1982–2024), American internet entrepreneur
- Mahmood Amiry-Moghaddam (born 1971), Norwegian-Iranian neuroscientist
- Mahta Moghaddam, Iranian-American electrical engineer and academic
- Mandana Moghaddam (born 1962), Swedish-Iranian visual artist
- Maryam Moghaddam (born c.1970), Iranian actress and filmmaker
- Masoud Fouladi Moghaddam (born 1985), Iranian record producer, artist and DJ
- Mehdi Sojoudi Moghaddam (born 1962), Iranian writer
- Morteza Kermani Moghaddam (born 1965), Iranian footballer
- Nasser Moghaddam (1921–1979), Iranian general
- Reza Moghaddam (born 1962), British-Iranian economist

== See also ==
- Moqaddam (disambiguation)
