= Djemi Djema mine =

Phosphate mine in Algeria

- Location: Tébessa Province, Algeria
- Products: Phosphates

The Djemi Djema mine is a large mine located in Tébessa Province. Djemi Djema represents one of the largest phosphates reserve in Algeria having estimated reserves of 620 million tonnes of ore grading 12% P_{2}O_{5}.
