= Diocese of Vicus Aterii =

Roman Catholic titular see

The Diocese of Vicus Aterii (Latin: Dioecesis Vico-Ateriensis) is a suppressed and Titular Bishopric of the Roman Catholic Church.

The ancient Bishopric was centered on Aterii, a vicus of the Roman province of Byzacena in what was Roman North Africa. Vicus Aterii is tentatively identified with Bir-El-Ater in modern Algeria.

There are three bishops of this diocese known from antiquity, and three from the modern era.

- Rogatian, a donatist who spoke at the Carthage conference of 411, which saw the Catholic and Donatist bishops of Roman Africa gathered together. The town did not have the Catholic bishop at that time. This bishop is probably the same Rogatian who participated in the council of Cabarsussi, held in 393 by the Maximianists, (a break away sect of the Donatists), and signed the deeds, but without the indication of his bishopric.
- Pacato took part in the synod gathered in Carthage by Huneric the Vandal king in 484, after which he was exiled.
- In a document of 525 there is an allusion to the bishop of Vico di Aterio, but without indication of his name.
- Ebasio took part in the antimonotelite council of 641.

The bishopric lasted until around the 690s when the Muslim conquest of the Maghreb caused it to effectively cease to operate. However in the 20th century the bishopric was revived in name at least. Today Vicus Aterii survives as a titular bishop's seat; the titular bishop until his death was Franz Vorrath, former auxiliary bishop of Essen.

- James Joseph Sweeney (1968–1968)
- Mathias Dionys Albert Paul Defregger (1968–1995)
- Franz Vorrath (1995–2022)
