= Morsott District =

Coordinates: 35°40′10″N 8°00′40″E

- District
- Country: Algeria
- Province: Tébessa Province
- Time zone: UTC+1 (CET)

Morsott District is a district of Tébessa Province, Algeria.

The district is further divided into 2 municipalities:

- Morsott
- Bir Dheb
