= Algeria–Tunisia border =

International border

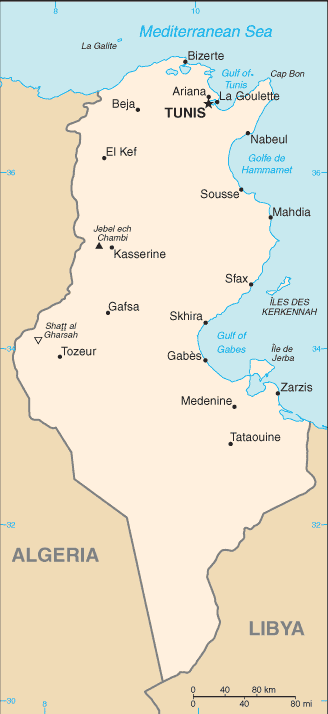
Map of Tunisia, with Algeria to the west

The Algeria–Tunisia border is 1,034 km (642 mi) in length and runs from the Mediterranean Sea in the north to the tripoint with Libya in the south.

== Description ==
The border starts in the north at the Mediterranean coast, proceeding overland in a broadly southwards direction via a series of overland lines. Toward the middle it curves west, and in the southern sections of the border straight lines predominate, which eventually veer to the south-east down to the tripoint with Libya.

== History ==
France occupied much of the northern coastal areas of Algeria in the period 1830-47 and Tunisia in 1881, both of which had hitherto been subject to the nominal control of the Ottoman Empire. France gradually pushed inland, annexing the Saharan areas of Algeria in 1902. The border from the coast south to Bir Ramane was established by various French decrees, notably those of 1888-89 and 1901. The sections south of this down to the Libyan tripoint was somewhat vaguer, and appear to have been delimited during the period 1911–23.

Tunisia gained independence from France in 1956. France and Tunisa then confirmed the existing boundary between them by an agreement of 6 January 1960.

Eventually, in 1962, Algeria (following the Algerian War) gained independence, making it an international border. Relations between the two have generally been positive.

== Settlements near the border ==
=== Algeria ===
- Lacroix
- Roum el Souk
- Oued Mougras
- Sidi Fhrerib
- Mechtat Ahmed
- Ouenza
- Aïn Zerga
- Ain Kouif
- Tébessa
- Oum Ali

=== Tunisia ===
- Tabarka
- Ain Draham
- Ghardimaou
- Hennchir Abid
- Sakiet Sidi Youssef
- Charpin Ville
- Haïdra
- Ain Amara
- Dernaia
- Moularès
- Tamerza

== See also ==
- Algeria–Tunisia relations
- Lake Mellah
