= Hamdan Bin Mohammed Smart University =

Emirian online educational institution

Coordinates: 25.10486°N 55.39243°E

Hamdan bin Mohammed Smart University
- جامعة حمدان بن محمد الذكية
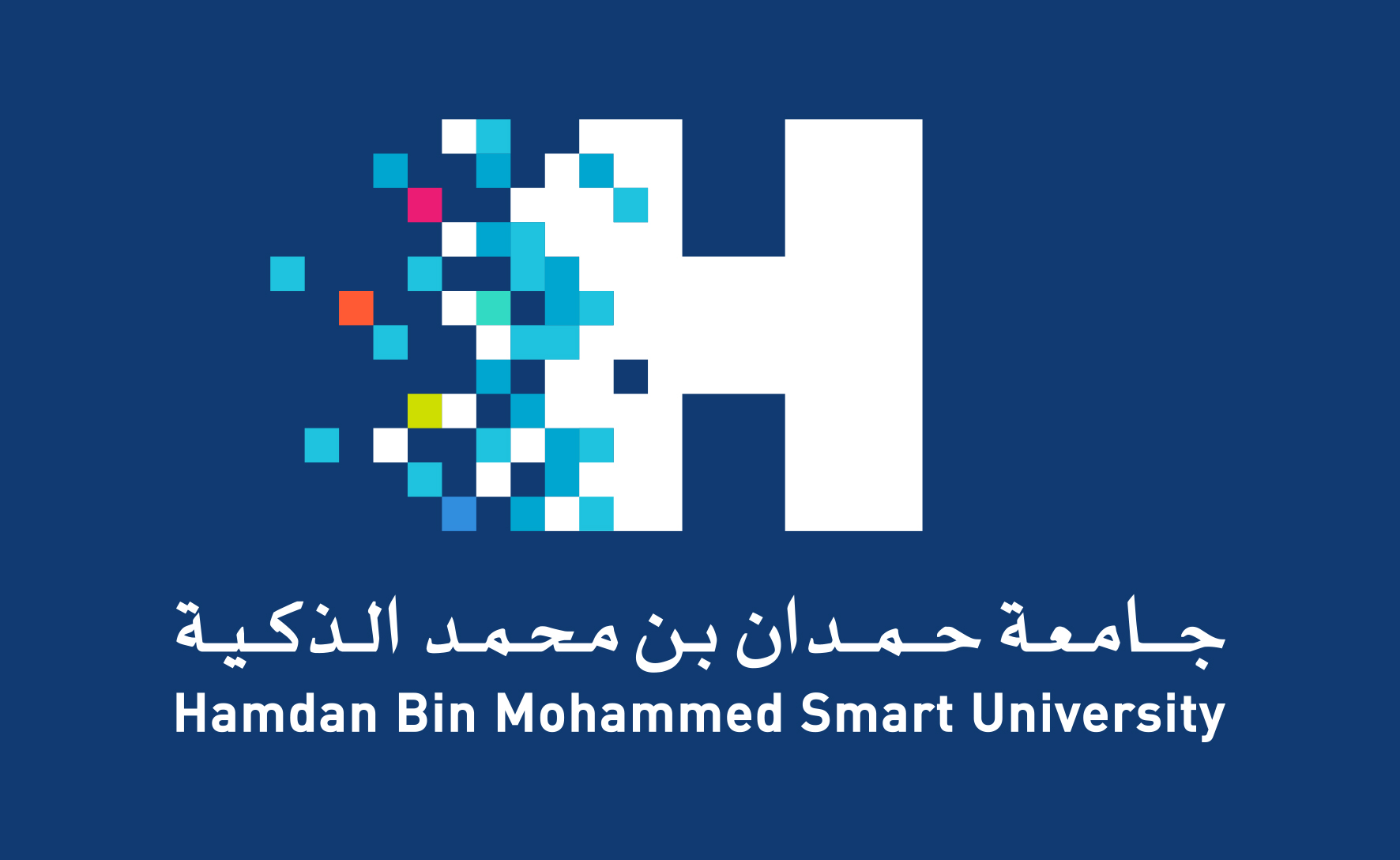
- Innovating Education
- Former names: Hamdan Bin Mohammed e-University
- Established: 2002
- Chairman: Hamdan bin Mohammed bin Rashid Al Maktoum
- Chancellor: Dr. Mansoor Al Awar
- Total staff: 350
- Students: 1600
- Location: Dubai, UAE
- Website: www.hbmsu.ac.ae

Hamdan Bin Mohammed Smart University (abbreviated HBMSU; formerly Hamdan Bin Mohammed e-University) is the first smart university in the United Arab Emirates, established in 2002. The President of the university is the Crown Prince of Dubai, Sheikh Hamdan bin Mohammed bin Rashid Al Maktoum. Being the first e-learning institute in the UAE, its working model has paved the way for the Ministry of Higher Education and Scientific Research (MOHESR), UAE to design standards for accreditation for an e-learning institution. Hamdan Bin Mohammed Smart University (HBMSU) follows in its delivery of learning a blended learning. These methods may include a mixture of face-to-face classrooms, online classrooms, and self-paced learning.

The student-centered environment at the university is reflected in the support offered to learners with automated pre-enrolment and admissions support, e-virtual communities and learners' clubs, and additional learning resources such as the Library, e-Career, and Placement Services, using the ICT technologies to communicate with learners across the globe. Its flagship virtual learning environment, Smart Campus won the 2015 Wharton-QS Stars Reimagine Education Awards.

The university is based on the paradigm of Lifelong Learning model providing all of its professional programs through certification routes to progress through a career path in multiple sectors including quality and business management, banking, healthcare, environment, smart learning, and e-education.

== Features ==
- The university is the first smart university accredited by the Ministry of Higher Education in the U.A.E.
- The university was the first Middle East organization to host International Council for Open and Distance Education Standing Conference of Presidents (SCOP 2012).
- In 2012, the university also became the first educational institute to enter children's entertainment world at KidZania® Dubai.
- In 2014, His Highness Sheikh Mohammed bin Rashid Al Maktoum launched the world's first online e-MBA in Islamic Banking & Finance designed by HBMSU at the 10th World Islamic Economic Forum.
- The university recently announced the launch of the first fully online master's degree offered by a university in the U.A.E.

== Accreditation ==
Accredited by UAE Ministry of Higher Education and Scientific Research.

The postgraduate degree of Master of Islamic Banking and Finance is accredited by Finance Accreditation Agency.

The postgraduate degree of Master in Public Health is accredited by Agency for Public Health Education Accreditation(APEHA).

== Location ==
The university campus is located in Dubai Academic City in the Emirate of Dubai.

== Academics ==
=== School of Business & Quality Management ===
The School is accredited locally in the UAE by the Ministry of Higher Education & Scientific Research and internationally by the Association to Advance Collegiate Schools of Business (AACSB).

The School offers short courses, diplomas, degree and doctoral certifications in Management, Total Quality Management, Innovation, Management, Islamic Banking and Project Management.

=== School of Health and Environment Studies ===
The School offers short courses, diplomas, degree and doctoral certifications in Public Health, Environmental Management and Health Administration.

=== School of e-Education ===
The School offers short courses, diplomas, degree and doctoral certifications in Curriculum development, Education Technology and Educational Leadership.

== Cloud Campus ==
Cloud Campus is a repository of 60 to 90-second videos that use the micro-learning method to disseminate and maximize knowledge retention. Cloud Campus offers 5,000 courses covering professional business skills, digital tools, and applications. Cloud Campus partnered with Starbucks to offer direct access to 10 hours of free interactive lectures which can be viewed using mobile devices, laptops, tablets, and smartphones running on Android, iOS, and Windows in its outlets across U.A.E.

== Dubai Center for Islamic Banking and Finance ==
The Dubai Center for Islamic Banking and Finance (DCIBF) is a specialized center for the development of human capital and talent in the Islamic finance industry and has been established in partnership with the "Dubai: Capital of Islamic Economy" initiative by Dubai Islamic Economy Development Centre.

== Innovation Arabia ==
Innovation Arabia , established in 2007 is an annual multi-conference on management, healthcare, education and Islamic Banking, organized by Hamdan Bin Mohammed Smart University.
