= El Aouinet =

Coordinates: 35°52′N 7°53′E

- Commune and town
- Country: Algeria
- Province: Tébessa Province
- Time zone: UTC+1 (CET)

El Aouinet is a town and commune in Tébessa Province in north-eastern Algeria.
