= Safsaf El Ouesra =

Coordinates: 34°57′24″N 8°12′28″E

- Commune and town
- Country: Algeria
- Province: Tébessa Province
- Time zone: UTC+1 (CET)

Safsaf El Ouesra is a town and commune in Tébessa Province in north-eastern Algeria.
