= Lahouidjbet =

Coordinates: 35.2972°N 8.2935°E

- Commune and town
- Interactive map of Lahouidjbet
- Country: Algeria
- Province: Tébessa Province
- Time zone: UTC+1 (CET)

Lahouidjbet is a town and commune in Tébessa Province in north-eastern Algeria.
