= Guorriguer =

Coordinates: 35°25′22″N 7°35′36″E

- Commune and town
- Interactive map of Guorriguer
- Country: Algeria
- Province: Tébessa Province
- Time zone: UTC+1 (CET)

Guorriguer is a town and commune in Tébessa Province in north-eastern Algeria.
