= Safra-ye Moqaddam =

Safra-ye Moqaddam صفرامقدم
- Village
- Location within Iran
- Coordinates: 30°43′46″N 48°45′26″E
- Country: Iran
- Province: Khuzestan
- County: Shadegan
- Bakhsh: Central
- Rural District: Buzi

Population (2006)
  - Total: 295
- Time zone: UTC+3:30 (IRST)
  - Summer (DST): UTC+4:30 (IRDT)

Safra-ye Moqaddam (Persian: صفرامقدم, also Romanized as Şafrā-ye Moqaddam and Şafrā-e Maqadam; also known as Şafrā) is a village in Buzi Rural District, in the Central District of Shadegan County, Khuzestan Province, Iran. As of the 2006 census, its population was 295, in 63 families.
