= El Ogla el Malha =

Coordinates: 35°07′19″N 7°57′04″E

- Commune and town
- Country: Algeria
- Province: Tébessa Province
- Time zone: UTC+1 (CET)

El Ogla el Malha is a town and commune in Tébessa Province in north-eastern Algeria.
