= El Mezerra =

Coordinates: 35°05′39″N 7°34′49″E

- Commune and town
- Interactive map of El Mezerra
- Country: Algeria
- Province: Tébessa Province
- Time zone: UTC+1 (CET)

El Mezerra is a town and commune in Tébessa Province in north-eastern Algeria.
