= Aïn Barbar mine =

Feldspar mine in Algeria

Coordinates: 36°59′25.1″N 7°33′26.9″E

- Interactive map of Aïn Barbar mine
- Location: Tamanrasset Province, Algeria
- Products: Feldspar

The Aïn Barbar mine is a large open pit mine in the south-eastern Algeria in Tamanrasset Province. Aïn Barbar represents one of the largest feldspar reserves in Algeria having estimated reserves of 7 million tonnes of ore.
