= El Meridj =

Coordinates: 35°48′N 8°14′E

- Commune and town
- Interactive map of El Meridj
- Country: Algeria
- Province: Tébessa Province
- Time zone: UTC+1 (CET)

El Meridj is a town and commune that is located in the Tébessa Province in north-eastern Algeria.
