= Negrine =

Coordinates: 34°29′N 7°31′E

Negrine نقرين Casae Nigrae
- Commune and town
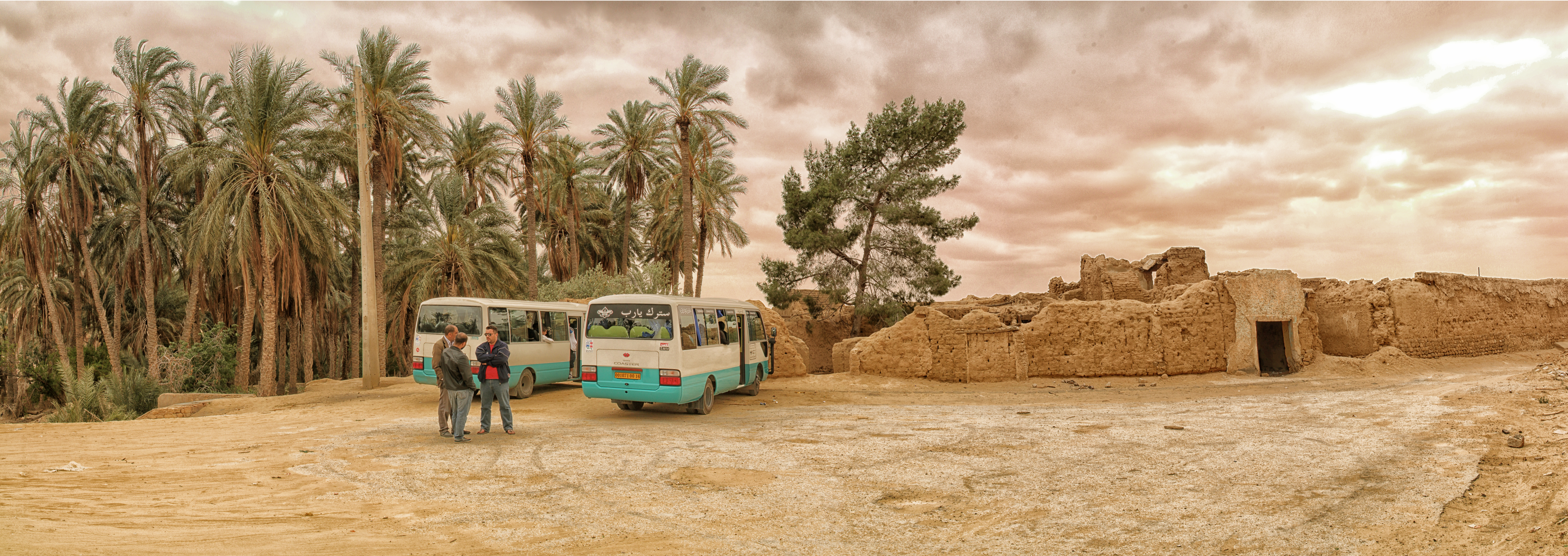
- The Old Town Of Negrine Tébessa.

- Country: Algeria
- Province: Tébessa

Government

Area
  - Total: 619 sq mi (1,604 km^{2})
- Elevation: 1,024 ft (312 m)

Population (2008)
  - Total: 9,445
- Time zone: UTC+1 (CET)
- Postal code: 12240

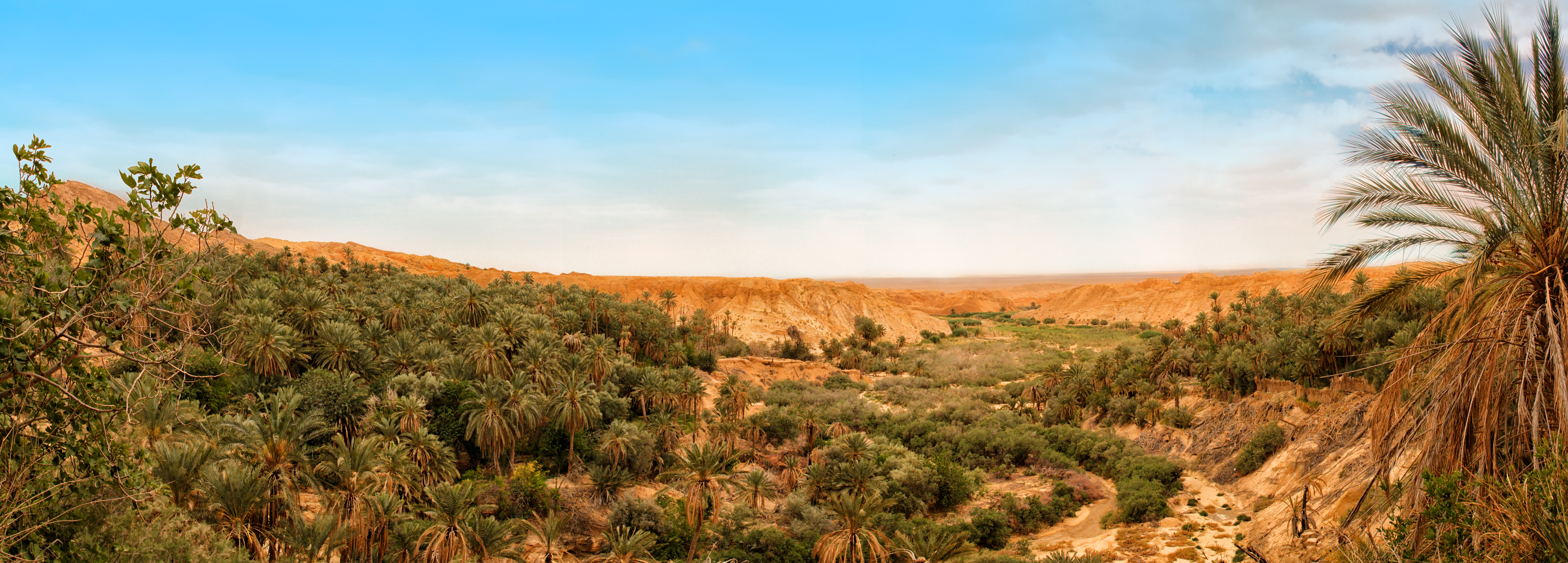
Casae Nigrae

Negrine is a town and commune in Tébessa Province in north-eastern Algeria. It was the site of ancient Casae Nigrae, a settlement of Roman North Africa with an attached bishopric that remains a Latin Catholic titular see.

== Geography ==
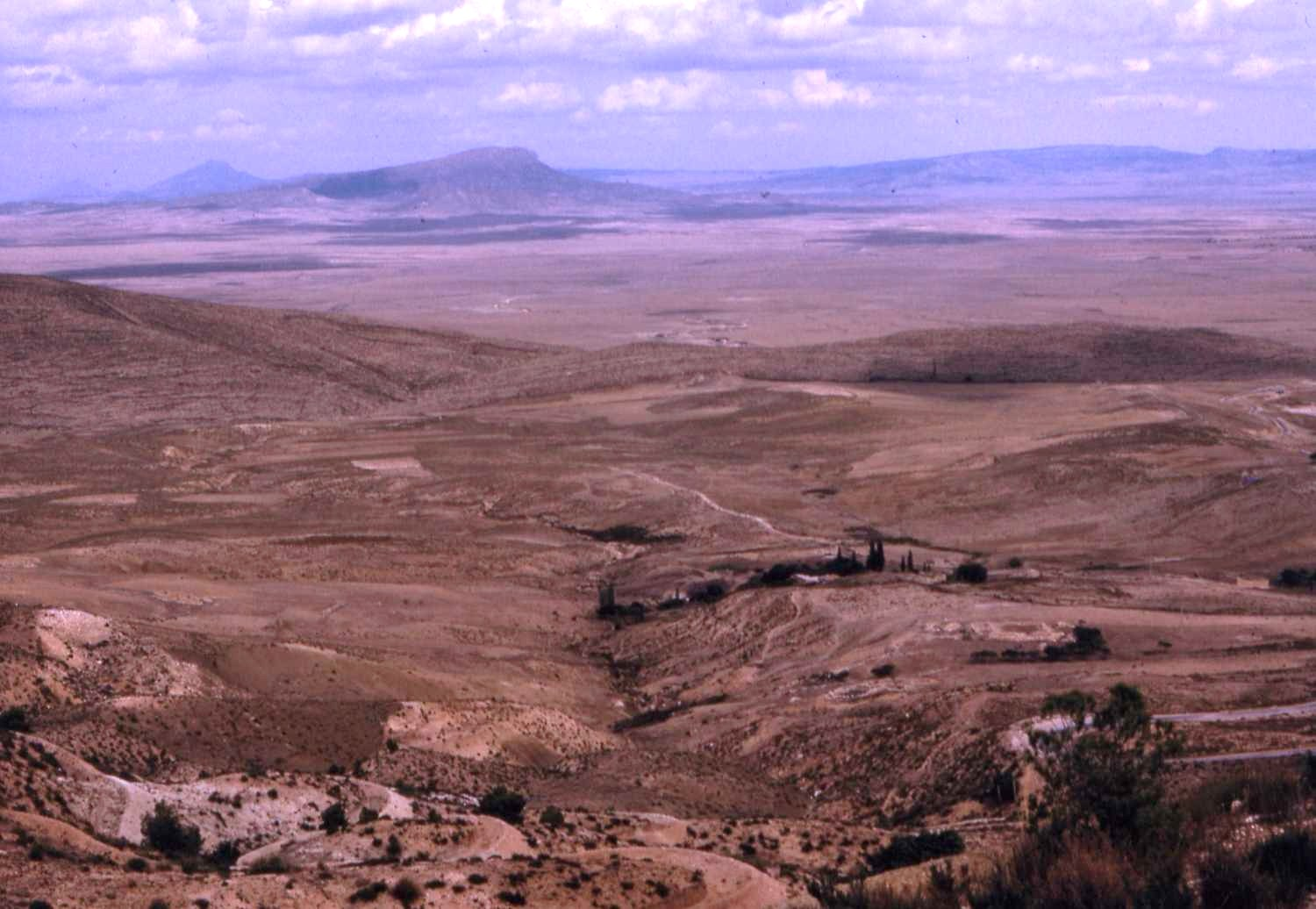
Negrine area

Negrine is located in the Negrine District of the sahara of Tébessa Province, NE Algeria. It is north of the Chott el Ghasa, near the borders of Tunisian border and has an elevation of 321 meters (1,053 ft) above sea level.

The village population was 9445 inhabitants in 2008. The landscape is generally arid and the topography is generally flat, interspersed with long low mesas transecting the countryside.

Average annual rainfall is between 5 and 20 millimetres (0.20 and 0.79 in) with the winter being the main wet season. Average temperatures range from 7 °C (45 °F) in winter to 40 °C (104 °F) in July.

== History ==
During prehistoric times Negrine was within the Capsian cultural area, which lasted from c. 8500 BC to 5400 BC. Snail shells and piles of ash which include mixed tools and kitchen refuse are some of the defining cultural elements of the Capsian culture, as well as engraved ostrich eggs.

Negrine was known as Casae Nigrae during the time of the Roman, Byzantine and Vandal empires (30 BC – AD 640). It was located in the province of Numidia, North Africa. Casae Nigrae was also known as Nigrenses Maiores during this period. There are extensive Roman ruins in the desert between Negrine and Tebessa, Algeria.

The area was incorporated into the Maghreb in the 7th century and today the area is home to the Nemencha, a tribe of Berber extraction.

== Ecclesiastical history ==
The town was the seat of one of many suffragan bishoprics in Numidia during Roman and Vandal times. It was the birthplace of Donatus Magnus, the founder and namesake of the Donatist Church, and the Donatist movement was influential in the town. Christian influence, however, effectively ended after the Muslim conquest of the 640s AD.

Known residential bishops include :

- Donatus the Great (fl. 311–312), founder of the schismatic heretical Donatist movement
- Ianvarianus (fl. 394–411), a Donatist bishop
- Felix (fl. 484), a Catholic bishop

=== Titular see ===
In 1933 the diocese was nominally restored as a Latin Titular bishopric in the Roman Catholic Church, named Casæ nigræ (Latin) / Case nere (Curiate Italian).

It has had the following incumbents, so far of the fitting Episcopal (lowest) rank:

- Francis Costantin Mazzieri Conventual Friars Minor (O.F.M. Conv.) (26 Nov. 1965 – retired 14 Dec. 1970), on emeritate as former only Apostolic Prefect of Ndola (Zambia) (1938 – 1949.01.13), promoted only Apostolic Vicar of Ndola (1949.01.13 – 1959.04.25) and Titular Bishop of Cœliana (1949.01.13 – 1959.04.25), again promoted first Suffragan Bishop of Ndola (1959.04.25 – 1965.11.26); died 1983
- Michael Patrick Olatunji Fagun (28 June 1971 – 30 July 1972) as Auxiliary Bishop of Ondo (Nigeria) (1971.06.28 – 1972.07.30); later only Bishop of Ado-Ekiti (Nigeria) (1972.07.30 – 1972.12.11), restyled first Bishop of Ekiti (Nigeria) (1972.12.11 – retired 2010.04.17)
- Heriberto Correa Yepes, Yarumal Society for the Foreign Missions (M.X.Y.)(29 Jan. 1973 – death 9 Sept. 2010) as Apostolic Vicar of Buenaventura (Colombia) (1973.01.29 – 1996.11.30) and on emeritate; previously Apostolic Prefect of Mitú (Colombia) (1953.03.27 – 1967)
- José Carlos Chacorowski, Lazarists (C.M.) (22 Dec. 2010 – 19 June 2013), as Auxiliary Bishop of São Luís do Maranhão (Brazil) (2010.12.22 – 2013.06.19); later Bishop of Caraguatatuba (Brazil) (2013.06.19 – ...)
- Robert Anthony Llanos (13 July 2013 – ...) as Auxiliary Bishop of Port of Spain (Trinidad and Tobago) (2013.07.13 – ...); also Apostolic Administrator of Saint John’s–Basseterre (Antigua and Barbuda) (2016.04.29 – ...).

== See also ==
- List of Catholic dioceses in Algeria

== Sources and external links ==
- GCatholic- (former and) titular bishopric
- Digital Atlas of the Roman Empire
