= Boulhaf Dir =

Coordinates: 35.4885°N 8.0717°E

- Commune and town
- Country: Algeria
- Province: Tébessa Province

Area
  - Total: 65 sq mi (168 km^{2})

Population (2008)
  - Total: 4,741
- Time zone: UTC+1 (CET)

Boulhaf Dir is a town and commune in Tébessa Province in north-eastern Algeria.
