= Franz Vorrath =

German Roman Catholic prelate (1937–2022)

His Excellency Franz Vorrath
- Auxiliary Bishop Emeritus of Essen
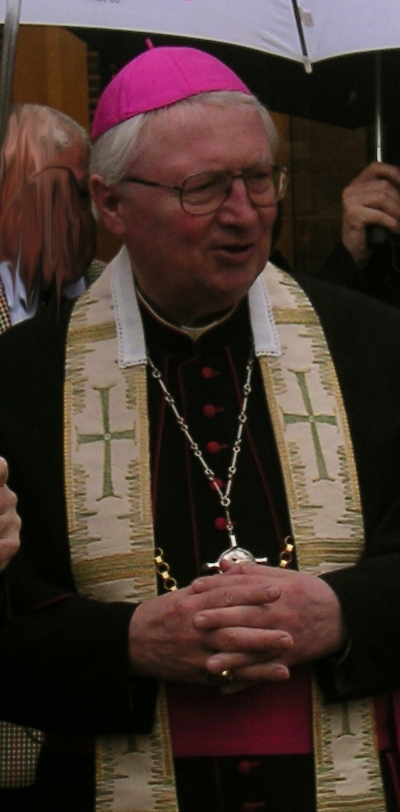
- Archdiocese: Cologne
- Appointed: 22 November 1995
- Term ended: 14 March 2014
- Other post: Titular Bishop of Vicus Aterii (1995–2022)

Orders
- Ordination: 26 July 1962 by Franz Hengsbach
- Consecration: 7 January 1996 by Hubert Luthe

Personal details
- Born: 9 July 1937 Essen, Rhine Province, Prussia, Germany
- Died: 17 October 2022 (aged 85) Duisburg, North Rhine-Westphalia, Germany
- Coat of arms

Franz Vorrath (9 July 1937 – 17 October 2022) was a German Roman Catholic prelate.

Vorrath was born in Germany and was ordained to the priesthood in 1962. He served as titular bishop of Vicus Aterii and as auxiliary bishop of the Roman Catholic Diocese of Essen, Germany, from 1996 until his retirement in 2014.

Catholic Church titles
Preceded by —	Auxiliary Bishop of Essen; 1995–2014	Succeeded by —
Preceded by Mathias Dionys Albert Paul Defregger	Titular Bishop of Vicus Aterii; 1995–2022	Succeeded by Vacant
