= Oum Ali =

Oum Ali أم علي
- Commune and town

- Location within Algeria
- Coordinates: 35°0′39″N 8°18′03″E
- Country: Algeria
- Province: Tébessa Province

Area
  - Total: 73 sq mi (188 km^{2})

Population (2008)
  - Total: 3,744
- Time zone: UTC+1 (CET)

Oum Ali is a town and commune in Tébessa Province in north-eastern Algeria, near the border with Algeria.
