= Tlidjene =

Coordinates: 35°07′03″N 7°46′02″E

- Commune and town
- Country: Algeria
- Province: Tébessa Province
- Time zone: UTC+1 (CET)

Tlidjene is a town and commune in Tébessa Province in north-eastern Algeria.
