= Boukhadra =

Commune and town in Algeria

Coordinates: 35°44′40″N 8°01′57″E

Boukhadra بوخضرة
- Commune and town
- Country: Algeria
- Province: Tébessa Province

Population (2008)
  - Total: 10,701
- Time zone: UTC+1 (CET)

Boukhadra (Arabic: بوخضرة) is a town and commune in Tébessa Province in north-eastern Algeria.
