= Hammamet, Tébessa =

Hammamet
- Commune and town

- Location within Algeria
- Coordinates: 35.4483648°N 7.9530716°E
- Country: Algeria
- Province: Tébessa Province

Area
  - Land: 34 sq mi (88 km^{2})

Population (2008)
  - Total: 20,148
- Time zone: UTC+1 (CET)

Hammamet is a town and commune in Tébessa Province in north-eastern Algeria.
