= Ferkane =

Coordinates: 34°34′N 7°24′E

- Commune and town
- Country: Algeria
- Province: Tébessa Province

Area
  - Total: 349 sq mi (903 km^{2})

Population (2008)
  - Total: 5,370
- Time zone: UTC+1 (CET)
- Postal Code: 12044

Ferkane is a town and commune in Tébessa Province in north-eastern Algeria.
