= Bir el Ater =

Bir El Ater بئر العاتر
- District

- Location within Algeria
- Coordinates: 34°44′55″N 8°03′29″E
- Country: Algeria
- Province: Bir El Ater Province
- Districts: Bir El Ater

Government
  - Type: بلدية

Area
  - Total: 588 sq mi (1,522 km^{2})

Population (2017)
  - Total: 120,000
  - Density: 200/sq mi (79/km^{2})
- Time zone: UTC+1 (CET)
- Post code: 12001
- Area code: 12

Bir el Ater (Arabic: بئر العاتر) is a city located in far eastern Algeria. It is located towards the border with Tunisia, around 87 kilometers south of Tebessa and just beyond the Sahara. The town has a population of approximately 120,000 (2017) inhabitants.

Bir el Ater is the type site of the Paleolithic Aterian industry. The term Aterian derives from el-Ater. This lithic culture lasted between 40000 – 20000 years BC.

It is now a mining city, located 15 km south of Bir El Ater. There are deposits of Djebel Onk Phosphates, the largest in Algeria which are extracted and shipped by train to Annaba a port, 300 km north on the Mediterranean or are used locally.

Historical population
Year	Population
1987	33,400
1998	53,200
2008	77,727
2010	100,000
2017	120,000

== Geography ==
To the north of Bir el-Ater is a plain. Agriculture was flourishing at the time of the Romans. Nowadays, the soil is dry and not very fertile. Vegetation consists essentially of tufts of alfa. To the south lies the Jebel Onk, north-east south-west, it is home to phosphates mines.

The landscape becomes more rugged with few peaks and wadis including many canyons in the yellow ocher. Continuing towards Negrine, the vegetation becomes increasingly rare and the ground is made of white clay and pebbles.

== History ==
=== Prehistoric ===
Early hominoid fossils have been found here. Further, Bir El Ater is the archaeological site which gave its name to the Aterian culture of North Africa which corresponds roughly to the late Middle Paleolithic and early Upper Paleolithic (30,000-40,000 years BC, even up to 20 000 years BP in the Sahara).

=== Antiquity ===
The former wealth of this area is attested by many Roman wells and a few villas. These remains are listed on the staff maps. The wells are all dried up today. A few kilometers north of Bir el-Ater are the ruins of a large Roman oil mill, preserved on two floors. The name of the village in antiquity was Vicus Aterii indicating only a small settlement, though it was the seat of an ancient Christian bishopric in the Roman province of Byzacena. The ancient Bishopric survives today as a titular see of the Roman Catholic Church called Vicus Aterii. and the bishop until his death was Franz Vorrath of Germany, the seat being subsequently left vacant.
