= El Ma El Biodh =

Coordinates: 35°12′20″N 8°10′12″E

- Commune and town
- Country: Algeria
- Province: Tébessa Province
- Time zone: UTC+1 (CET)

El Ma El Biodh is a town and commune in Tébessa Province in north-eastern Algeria.
