= Aïn Zerga =

- Commune and town

- Location within Algeria
- Coordinates: 35°38′55″N 8°15′40″E
- Country: Algeria
- Province: Tébessa Province
- Time zone: UTC+1 (CET)

Aïn Zerga is a town and commune in Tébessa Province in north-eastern Algeria, near the border with Tunisia.
