= Bir El Mokadem =

Coordinates: 35.3725°N 7.8074°E

- Commune and town

- Location within Algeria
- Country: Algeria
- Province: Tébessa Province
- Time zone: UTC+1 (CET)

Bir El Mokadem is a town and commune in Tébessa Province in north-eastern Algeria.
