= El Kouif =

Coordinates: 35°30′N 8°19′E

- Commune and town
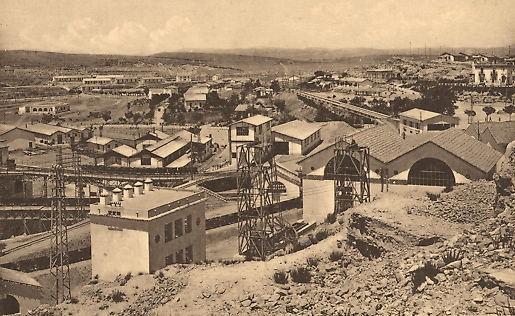
- El Kouif phosphate mines, 1928

- Country: Algeria
- Province: Tébessa Province

Area
  - Total: 99 sq mi (257 km^{2})

Population (2008)
  - Total: 17,319
- Time zone: UTC+1 (CET)

El Kouif is a town and commune in Tébessa Province in north-eastern Algeria.
