= Tébessa Province =

Province of Algeria

Tébessa Province ولاية تبسة
- Province
- Map of Algeria highlighting Tébessa
- Coordinates: 35°24′N 8°7′E
- Country: Algeria
- Capital: Tébessa

Government
  - Wāli: Ahmed Belhadad

Area
  - Total: 14,227 km^{2} (5,493 sq mi)

Population (2008)
  - Total: 657,227
  - Density: 46.196/km^{2} (119.65/sq mi)
- Time zone: UTC+01 (CET)
- Area Code: +213 (0) 37
- ISO 3166 code: DZ-12
- Districts: 12
- Municipalities: 28

Tébessa (Arabic: ولاية تبسة) is a province (wilayah) of Algeria. Tébessa is also the name of the capital, which in ancient times it was known as Theveste. Another important city in the province is El Ouenza. The city of Tébessa is located 20 kilometers west of the Tunisian border.

== History ==
The province was created from Annaba department and Batna (département) in 1974.

In 1984 Khenchela Province was carved out of its territory.

== Administrative divisions ==
The province is divided into 12 districts (daïras), which are further divided into 28 communes or municipalities.

=== Districts ===
1. Bir El Ater
2. Bir Mokadem
3. Cheria
4. El Aouïnet
5. El Kouif
6. El Ma Labiodh
7. El Ogla
8. Morsott
9. Negrine
10. Ouenza
11. Oum Ali
12. Tebessa

=== Communes ===
1. Ain Zerga
2. Bedjene
3. Bekkaria
4. Bir Dheheb (Bir Dheb)
5. Bir El Ater (Bir-El-Ater)
6. Bir Mokadem
7. Boukhadra
8. Boulhaf Dir (Boulhaf Dyr)
9. Cheria
10. El Aouinet (El-Aouinnet)
11. El Kouif
12. El Ma El Biod (El Malabiodh)
13. El Meridj
14. El Mezeraa
15. El Ogla
16. El Ogla Malha (Ogla Melha)
17. Ferkane
18. Guorriguer
19. Hammamet
20. Lahouidjbet
21. Morsott (Morsot)
22. Negrine
23. Ouenza
24. Oum Ali
25. Safsaf Ouesra (Saf Saf El Ouesra)
26. Stah Guentis
27. Tebessa
28. Tlidjen (Tlidjene, Thelidjene)

== See also ==
- Oueid Khenig-Roum bombing
