= Vehicle registration plates of France =

- French front plate with local reference to a Department number (from 2009). In this example, 00 is used as a placeholder. There is a regional logo at the top right and the number of the department below it.
- Country: France
- Country code: F

Current series
- Size: 520 mm × 110 mm 20.5 in × 4.3 in
- Serial format: AA-123-AA
- Colour (front): Black on white
- Colour (rear): Black on white
- Introduced: 2009

History
- First issued: 1901

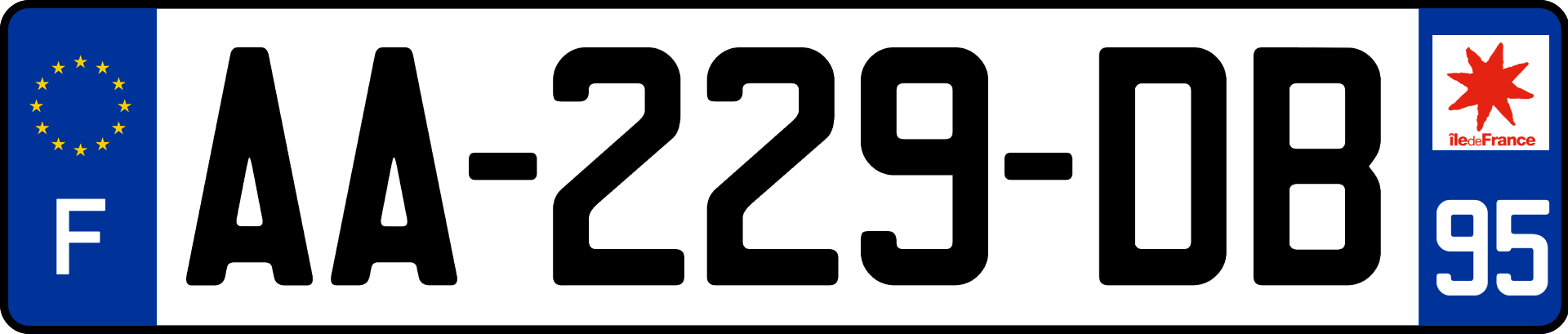

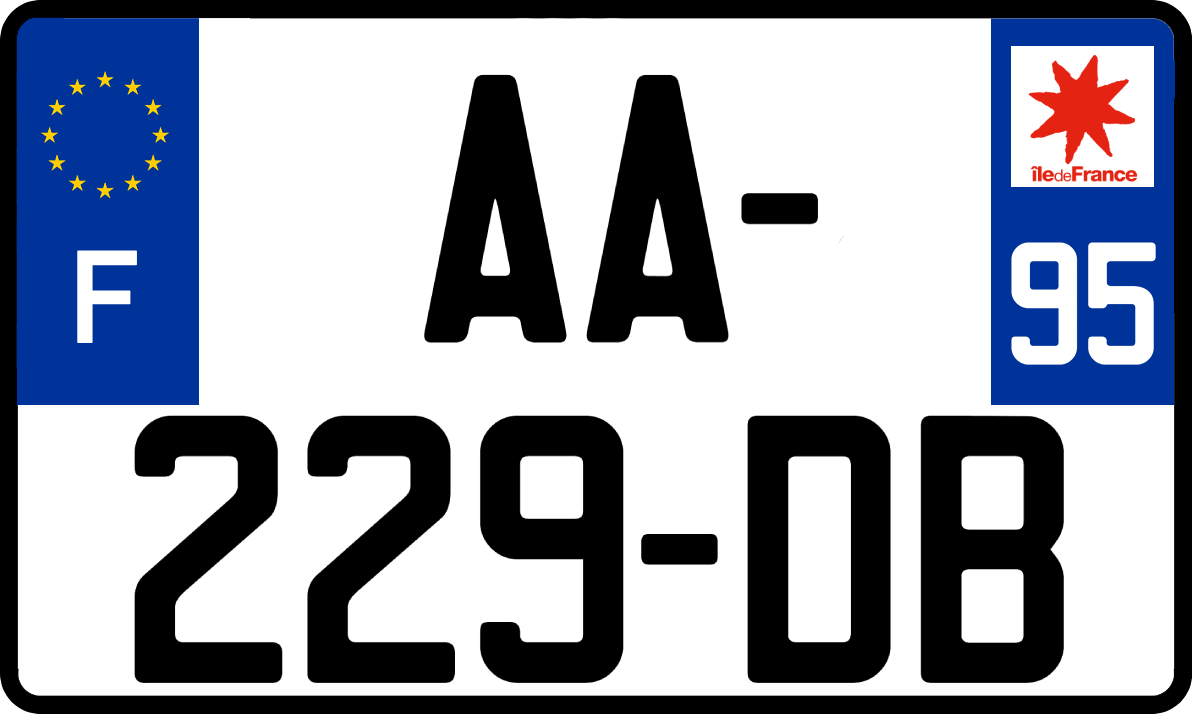

Vehicle registration plates are mandatory number plates used to display the registration mark of a vehicle registered in France. They have existed in the country since 1901. It is compulsory for most motor vehicles used on public roads to display them.

In French, vehicle registration plates are called plaques d'immatriculation or plaques minéralogiques. The latter makes a reference to the national mining administration, which was responsible for issuing the plates in the early 20th century.

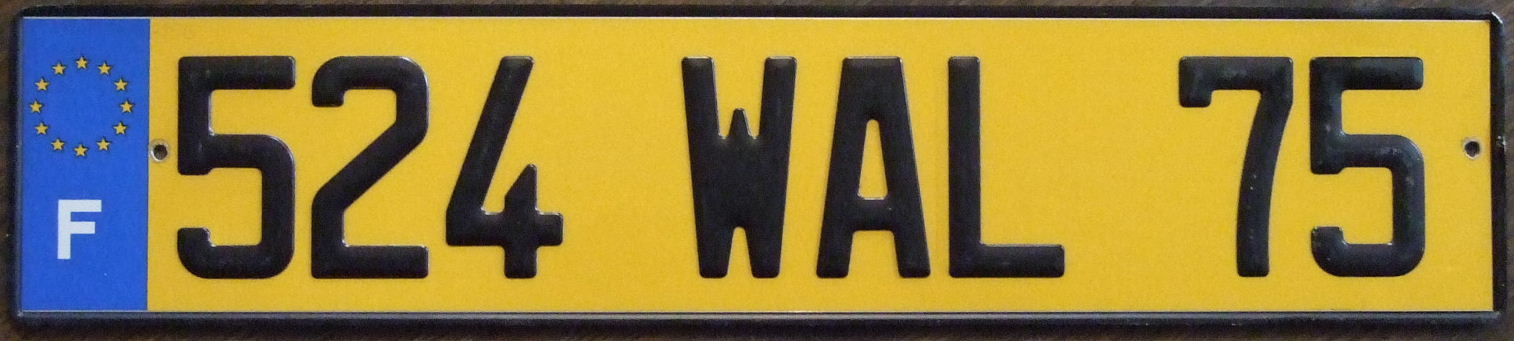
A pre-2009 car plate with the two-digit code for Paris (75).

Since 1901, various systems have been successively introduced, the most recent dating from 2009. The registration plates issued since 2009 use a XX-NNN-ZZ format, composed of a series of 7 alphanumeric characters: 2 letters, 3 numbers, and then 2 letters (e.g. AB-126-FD). This format is monitored nationwide and car plates are permanent and attached to a single vehicle from its first registration to its disposal. As such, car plates do not need to be changed if the car is sold or if the owner moves to another region within France.

Cars bought before 2009 can still bear the old format, dating from 1950, if the owner has not moved to a different département since then. Unlike the new one, the 1950 format is geographical. Until 2009, car plates had to be changed whenever the owner moved to another département or bought a car from a person living in a different département. The 1950 format uses a N X NN format, composed of a series of one to four numbers, one to three letters and a two-digit code corresponding to the département where the car is registered. The international code for French plates is "F" (France). Some older French number plates did not have any blue stripes.

== Current scheme ==
=== SIV ===
A two-line registration plate with the code for Oise (60) and the logo of Picardy region.

Called système d'immatriculation des véhicules ("vehicle registration system"), shortened to SIV, the current scheme was adopted in France in 2009 (15 April for new vehicles; 15 October for second-hand ones). It was inspired by the "AA-111-AA" format that was successfully adopted in Italy in 1994. Under the SIV scheme, car plates are permanent and do not need to be changed if the car owner sells it or moves to a different region.

The SIV system was adopted to ease vehicle registration and law enforcement on roads because it is fully monitored by computer and administered nationwide. The SIV database can easily be combined with other computer files. The SIV was also implemented to replace the 1950 format, which was running out of character combinations. Had it been maintained, it would have been completely exhausted by 2025 for Paris, the most populous French département. The SIV scheme started in 2004 for motorcycles with an engine capacity under 50 cc. However, these vehicles carry plates with fewer characters, such as AA-11-A.

Due to the 2008 financial crisis, the introduction of the new plates was postponed from 1 January 2009 until 15 April 2009 for all new cars. It was again postponed until 15 October 2009 for all other vehicles due to computer bugs in the SIV system.

=== Colour and dimensions ===
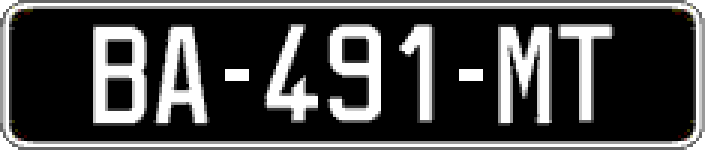
Black plates are permitted on registered classic cars.

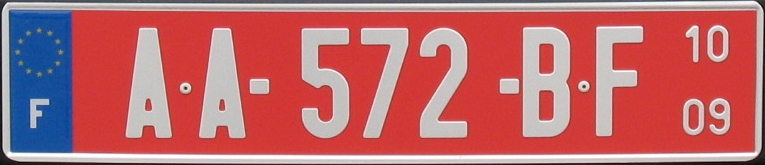
A temporary transit plate, with the expiry date on the right (October 2009).

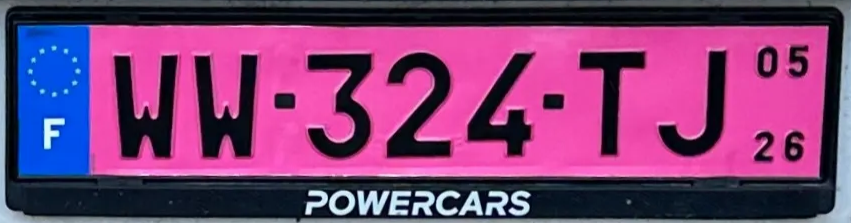
A temporary license plate with pink background issued after 2026

Registration plates issued after 2009 must be displayed in accordance with the 9 February 2009 Order (French: Arrêté du 9 février 2009). They must be made of reflex-reflecting material, white at the front and rear, with black non-reflecting characters. Characters may be displayed on one or two lines. The industry standard size number plate is 520 mm × 110 mm (20.5 in × 4.3 in) or 520 mm × 120 mm (20.5 in × 4.7 in) if it includes a horizontal cartouche to display information about the car dealer. The left side of the plate must contain a blue band with the letter F for France under the stars of the European flag. A similar band must be present on the right side to display a department code and the symbol of the region where the département is located.

The positioning of the characters on the plate is fully regulated but there is no official typeface. The law provides guidelines: characters must be sans serif, monospaced and without any opening on closed characters.

In some cases, colours may vary. Vehicles registered as classic cars can carry black plates with silver or white characters and without the blue bands on the sides. Vehicles in transit on French territory must carry a red plate with white characters. Instead of the regional code, the right hand band displays the expiry date of the plate. Vehicles purchased in the free trade zones of Gex and Savoie also carry red plates, but with the regional code. Diplomatic vehicles carry green plates with orange or white characters. Vehicles owned by the French Forces and Civilian Elements stationed in Germany (FFECSA) carry a pale blue plate with white characters. Since 2026, temporary plates have a pink background, with the regional code replaced by the expiration date, in an attempt to simplify road checks.

Motorcycles and mopeds have to display a rear plate. Motorcycle plates have the same colour and general design as the usual vehicle plates.

=== Numbering ===
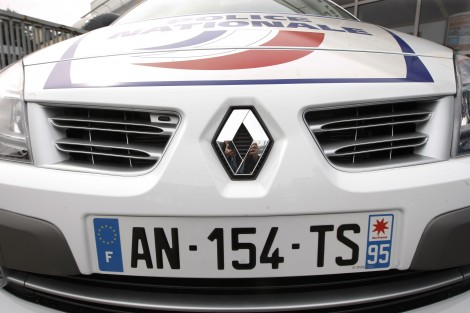
A registration plate on a National Police patrol car with the code for Val-d'Oise (95) and the logo of Île-de-France region.

Under the SIV system, registration plates contain seven alphanumeric characters: two letters, a dash, three numbers, a dash and two letters, such as AA-001-AA and no such series as AA-001-AI/AA-001-AO/AA-001-AU or AI-001-AA/AO-001-AA/AU-001-AA. The system is nationwide and chronological. The first car registered in France under the SIV, a Mazda 6 station wagon, received a AA-001-AA registration plate, the second one AA-002-AA, the third AA-003-AA. The system will be exhausted when ZZ-999-ZZ is reached, which is scheduled to occur after 80 years of use.

The numbering system goes as follows:

- AA-001-AA to AA-999-AA (numbers evolve first);
- AA-001-AB to AA-999-AZ (then the last letter on the right);
- AA-001-BA to AA-999-ZZ (then the first letter on the right);
- AB-001-AA to AZ-999-ZZ (then the last letter on the left);
- BA-001-AA to ZZ-999-ZZ (then the first letter on the left).

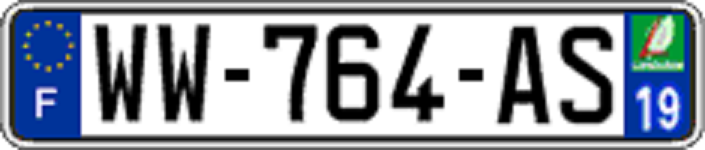
A temporary car plate, starting with WW, with the code for Corrèze (19) and the logo of Limousin region.

The SIV format provides $((23 \times 23) - 2) \times 999 \times ((23 \times 23) - 1)$, or 277,977,744, different combinations. This figure excludes three letters that are not used: I, O and U, as they can be confused with 1, 0 and V, respectively. It also excludes the SS combination because it is reminiscent of the Nazi organisation and WW in the first group of letters as it indicates a temporary plate. Other combinations of letters that were avoided in the previous system because they sounded vulgar to French speakers, such as KK, PD, PQ, QQ, and WC, were included in the SIV.

Here's what the numbering system would go with restrictions:

- After HZ-999-ZZ, the system will skip to JA-001-AA.
- After NZ-999-ZZ, the system will skip to PA-001-AA.
- After SR-999-ZZ, the system will skip to ST-001-AA.
- After TZ-999-ZZ, the system will skip to VA-001-AA.

The SIV system does not provide special plates for the government, army, police or any other organisation that had such plates under the previous system. Their vehicles display regular registration plates. The only exception concern temporary plates, which start with WW, and demonstration cars at car dealers, whose plates start with W.

=== Regional codes ===
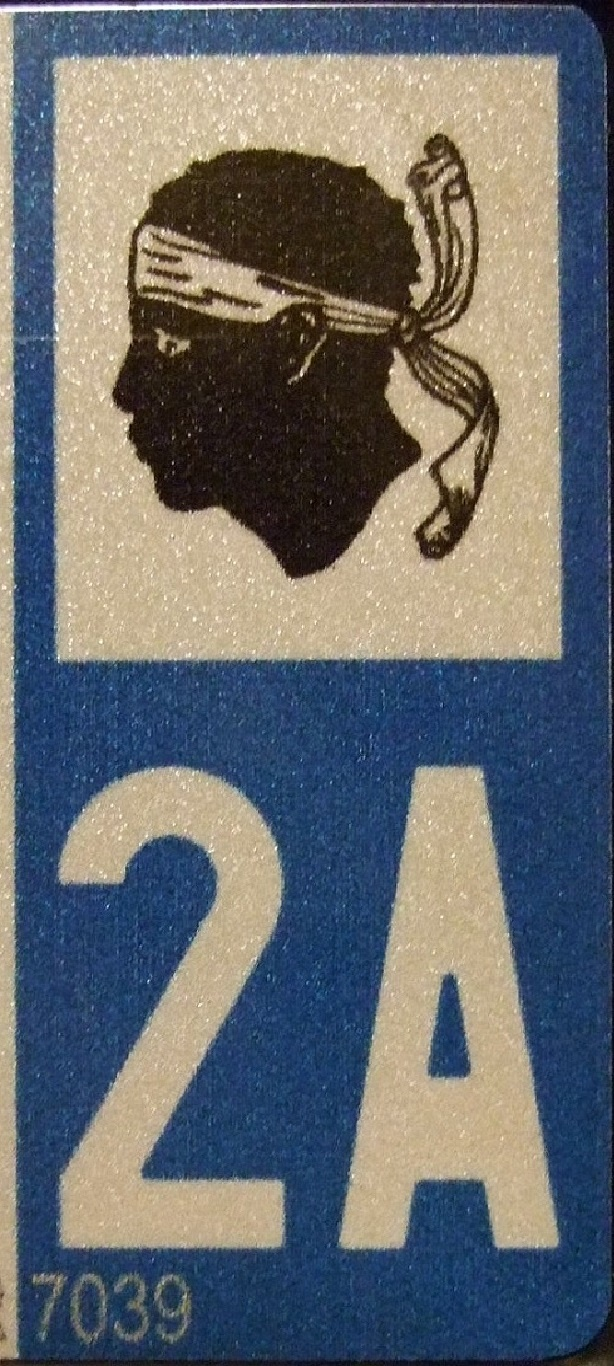
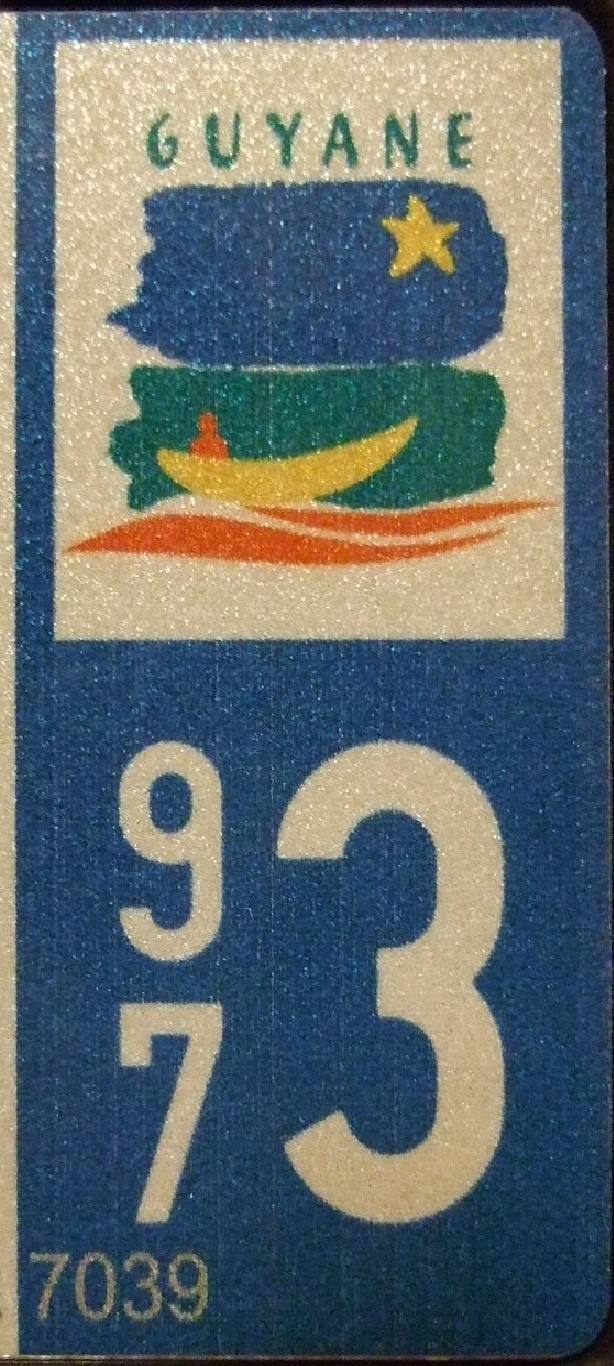
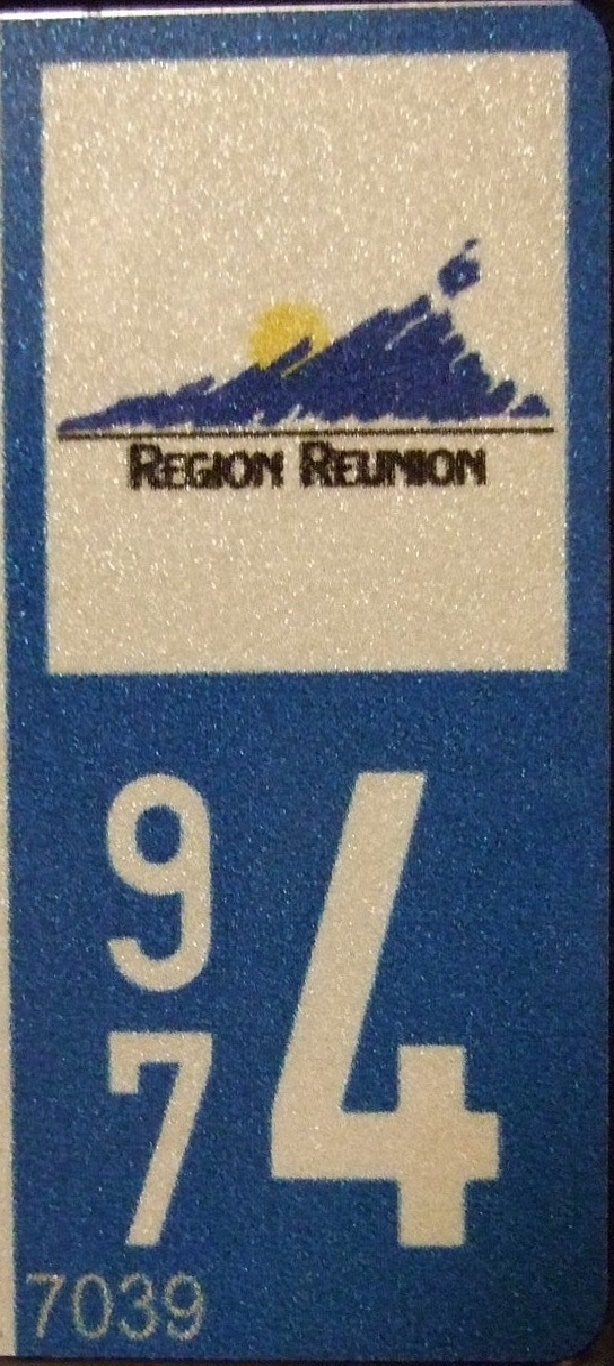
Blue bands of plates from (left to right) Morbihan (56, Brittany), Corse-du-Sud (2A, Corsica), French Guiana (973), and Réunion Island (974).

As it is nationwide, the SIV system does not use geographical codes as did the previous system. At first, it was not planned to display the departments' codes on the new plates. Because of that, the new format encountered strong opposition. Parliamentarians from both the majority and opposition lobbied at the National Assembly to keep what they saw as a part of national identity. In 2008, several months before the SIV system was implemented, the Minister of the Interior acknowledged the attachment French people had to their départements and decided to add a blue band on the right to display geographical codes.

As it is not used for administrative purposes, car owners can choose the code of the département they want, no matter where they reside. The code must be displayed together with the symbol of the corresponding region. It is forbidden to display the symbol of a region the chosen département does not belong to. The département code may be changed at any time without any change in the registration documents.

The département codes are also used for other purposes, such as statistics and postcodes. They contain two numbers, such as 05 for Hautes-Alpes and 67 for Bas-Rhin. Some exceptions exist however. The two départements of Corsica, Corse-du-Sud and Haute-Corse, use 2A and 2B because they were created only in 1976 when the Corse département (20) was split in two. The overseas départements have three-digit codes, starting with 97, which was originally the single code for them all. For instance the code for Guadeloupe is 971 and the one for Martinique is 972.

Shortly before the introduction of the system French regions were asked which symbol they wanted to represent them on car plates. The vast majority chose their logos, except Alsace, which opted for its coat of arms, and Brittany and Corsica, which chose their flags.

== Previous scheme ==
=== FNI ===
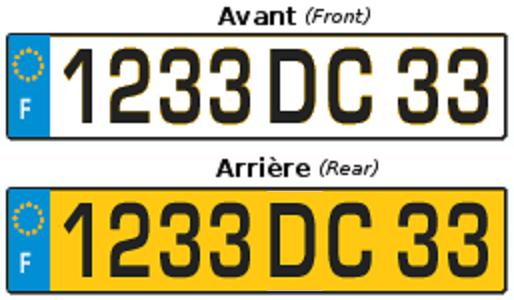
French registration plates (until 2009).

Before the introduction of the current format in 2009, French cars were registered under the FNI system (French: Fichier National des Immatriculations, "National Car Registration Record"). The FNI format was adopted in 1950 and amended several times due to its long operating life.

Vehicle owners had to re-register their vehicle if they relocated permanently to another département. There used to be an annual tax on cars, called the vignette, whose rate depended on the département. This tax now exists only for corporate-owned vehicles (and there exist exemptions for small numbers of vehicles); it is thus no longer important to know the department of a car on sight. Furthermore, computerised files allow large national databases to be maintained without the need for them to be split at local level.

A side effect of the vehicle tax system was that many corporations registered their vehicles in departments, such as Oise (60), with lower rates. Regulations aimed at preventing such schemes were passed in 1999.

=== Colour and dimensions ===
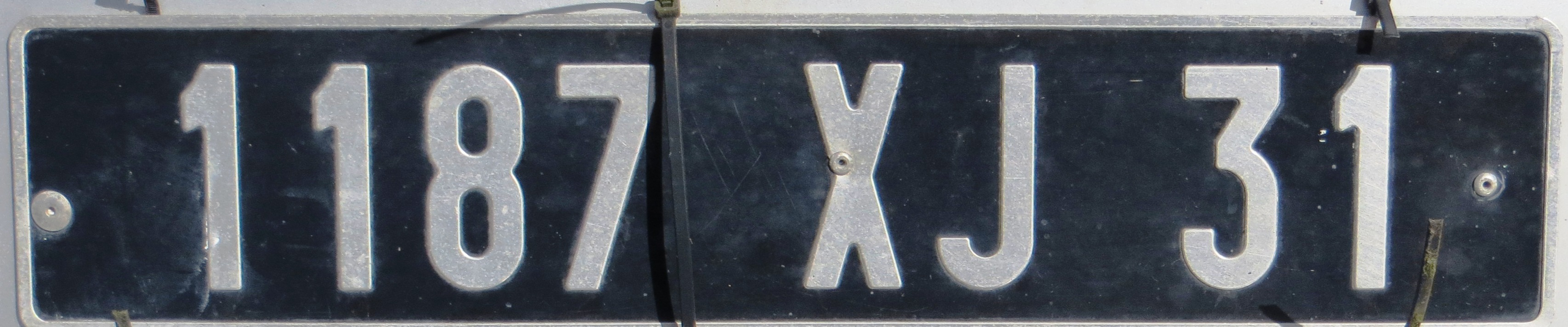
A pre-1993 black registration plate from Haute-Garonne (31).

As with the SIV format, plates issued under the FNI system were closely regulated by law. They had to meet a number of requirements about size, shape, colour, typeface and material. From the adoption of the format in 1950 until its withdrawal in 2009, several laws and orders came to modify regulations on plates. For instance, the blue band with the European stars and the letter F was introduced in 1998 and became compulsory on new plates in 2004.

At the beginning, plates were black with white or silver characters. Reflective plates were introduced in 1963 but only became compulsory on new cars in 1993. The new plates had to be white on the front and yellow on the rear until 2007, when white rear plates were allowed.

=== Numbering ===
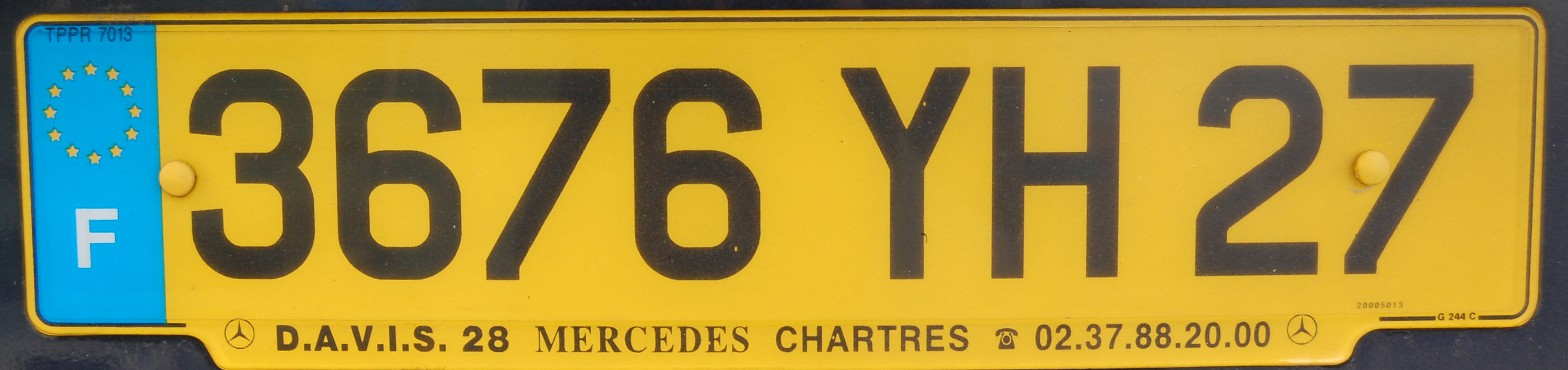
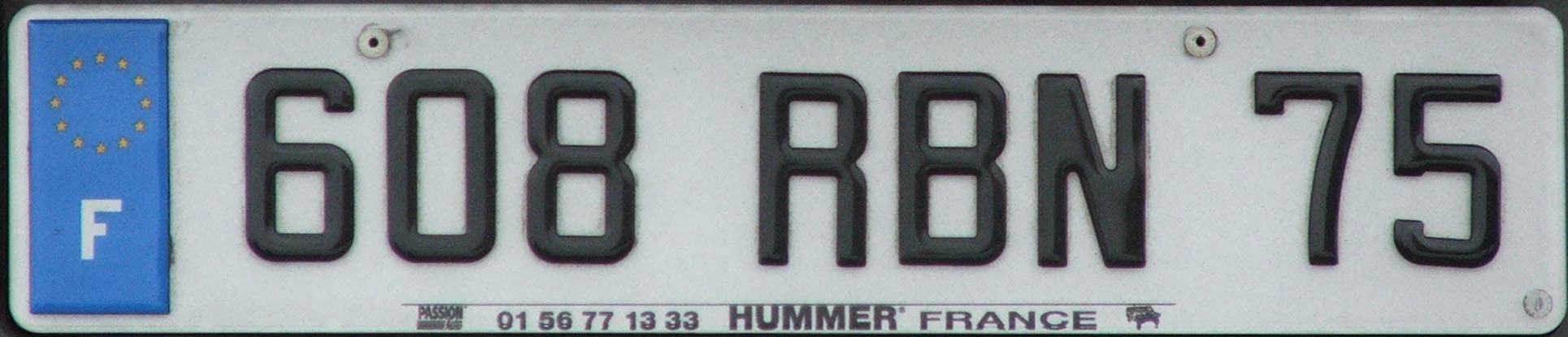
Less populated départements such as Eure (27) still had only two letters on their car plates in the 2000s, while others like Paris (75) were approaching the ZZZ combination.

The FNI format was chronological, as is the SIV system. It was also regional, which means that it evolved independently in each département. Registration plates contained from 4 to 8 alphanumeric characters split into three parts by spaces. The first space could be omitted on registration plates issued after 1996.

- First part: one to four numbers;
- Second part: one to three letters;
- Third part: the code for departments.

Numbering went as follows: numbers evolved first, starting from 1, until they reached 999. Then letters evolved. The first car registered in Paris had a 1 A 75 car plate, and the second one 2 A 75. Once 999 A 75 had been reached, the following car was registered under 1 B 75. The format would have been exhausted in Paris once 999 ZZZ 75 had been reached.

The following chronology summarises the numbering system. Most of the départements chose to have four numbers on their plates once the letters reached QA, in order to have more combinations available. The "00" at the end stands for the geographical code.

- 1 A 00 to 999 Z 00;
- 1 AA 00 to 999 PZ 00;
- 1 QA 00 to 9999 ZZ 00;
- 1 AAA 00 to 999 ZZZ 00.

Numbers from 1 to 10 and numbers identical to the département code (whether it be the one code or even a double code for some départements, such as 24 VQ 24 or 2727 YV 27) were not used after 1976. In some départements, round numbers (such as 200 ACL 54), or even repeat numbers (such as 5555 PL 10) weren't even issued. Just like the SIV system, the letters I and O were never used because they could be confused with other characters, like numbers 1 and 0. U was excluded as well in 1984, similar to the letter V, but some départements issued registration plates containing that letter until 1991. The letter O was exceptionally used on official cars at the 1992 Winter Olympics in Albertville. Such cars had registration plates with figures between 1 JO 73 and 9999 JO 73. "JO" stands for Jeux olympiques while "73" is the code for Savoie where the games took place. Offensive letter combinations, for instance SS, PD, PQ, QQ, KK or WC, were avoided by some départements either because of historical reasons or because they sound vulgar to French speakers. In the same way, Haute-Garonne did not deliver car plates with "AZF" after the tragic explosion of the AZF factory in Toulouse in 2001. MMM, MMW, MWM and MWW were withdrawn in 1994 because they needed too much space on plates.

Bearing in mind that only 23 letters were used by the format and that most of the départements used four numbers after reaching QA, the number of car plates that the FNI format provides can be estimated at: (999 × 22) + (999 × 14 × 23) + (9988 × 9 × 23) + (988 × 21 × 23 × 23) = 13,386,864. This figure does not take into account avoided letter and number combinations.

=== Regional codes ===
Under the FNI system, the code of the département was placed at the right of the registration plate. The codes are part of the Community Identification Number known in France as Code officiel géographique and are not only used for car registration but also in postcodes, statistics and for many other purposes.

Each code consists of two digits except for Corse-du-Sud and Haute-Corse (2A and 2B) and the overseas departments where the identifier consists of 3 digits (in the series 971 to 978), the first two digits were often stacked on plates to save space.

Between 1950 and 2009 France experienced some territorial changes that reflected on regional codes. Algeria was part of France until 1962 and French Algeria was also divided into départements. They had their own codes, which were used on plates the same way as in the rest of France: Alger 91, Oran 92, Constantine 93 and the Southern Territories 94. Bône was created in 1955 and received 99. Several new départements were created in 1956–1958 as France was struggling with independence movements in the Algerian War. The new départements used codes such as 9A, 9B, 9C, 9D, etc. After the independence of the country, French car plates were no longer used there and Algerian codes became obsolete with the use of a local plate system.

In 1968 two départements in the Paris region were split into smaller ones because of the growing population. 75, which had been the code for Seine, was attributed to Paris and 78 (Seine-et-Oise) to Yvelines. Newly created départements were Essonne (91), Hauts-de-Seine (92), Seine-Saint-Denis (93), Val-de-Marne (94) and Val-d'Oise (95). Most of them received numbers that had previously been allocated to the départements in French Algeria.

Saint Pierre and Miquelon, now a self-governing overseas collectivity with its own registration plates, was a proper département between 1976 and 1985. As such, it could have had FNI format car plates but it always kept its own local format.

=== Special plates ===
==== Permanent special plates ====
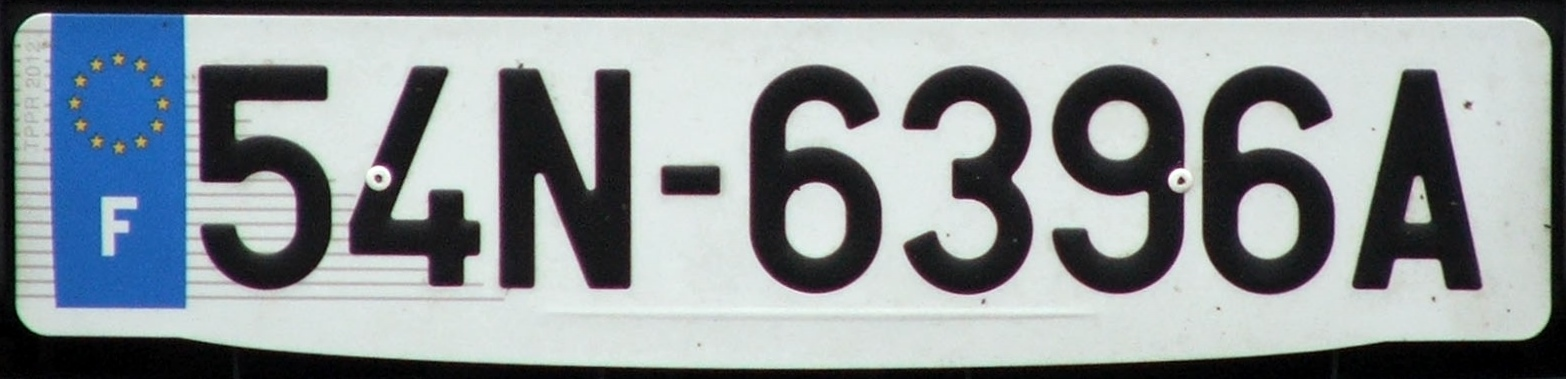
Registration plate of the National Police.

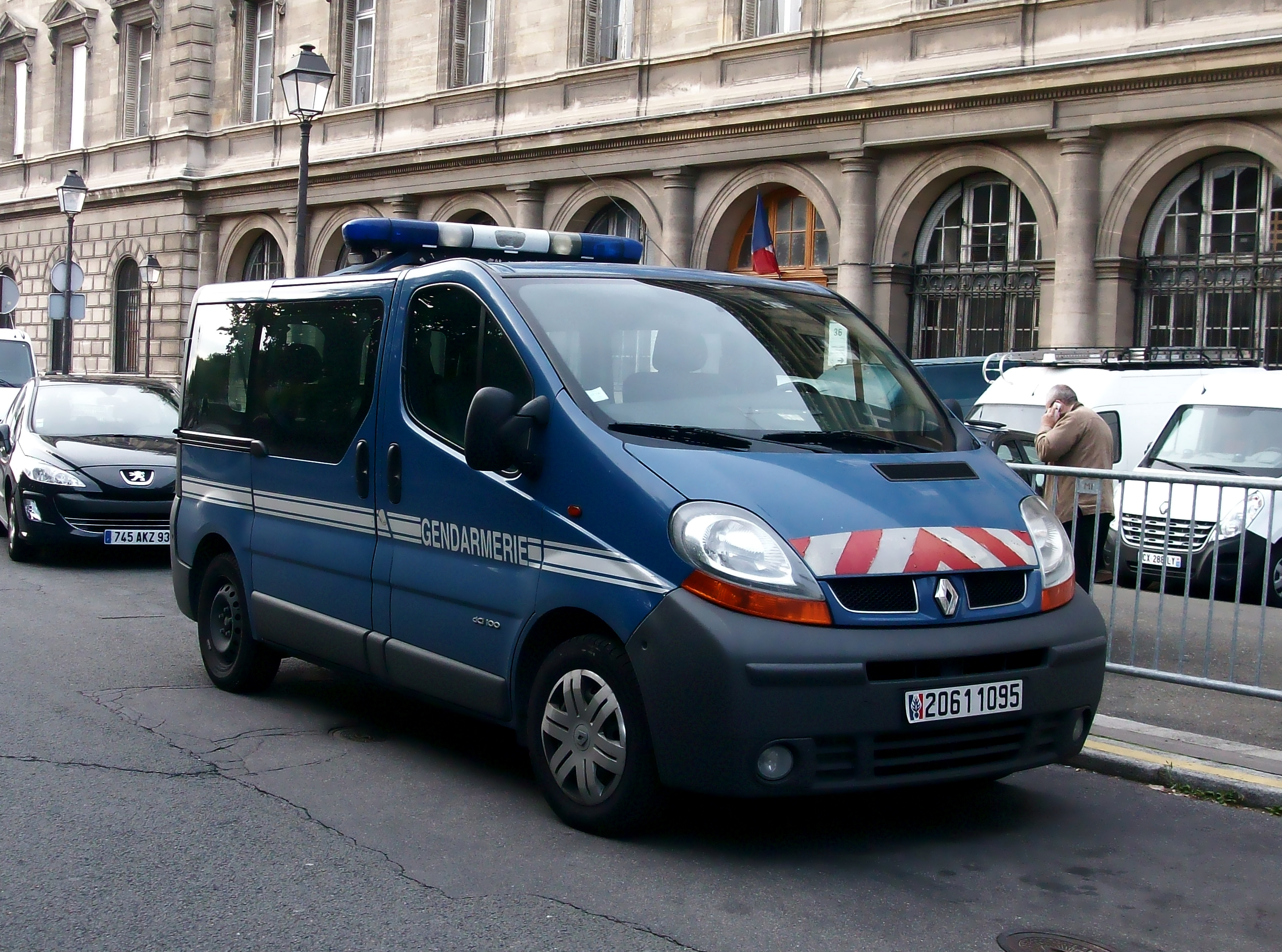
Registration plate of the National Gendarmerie.

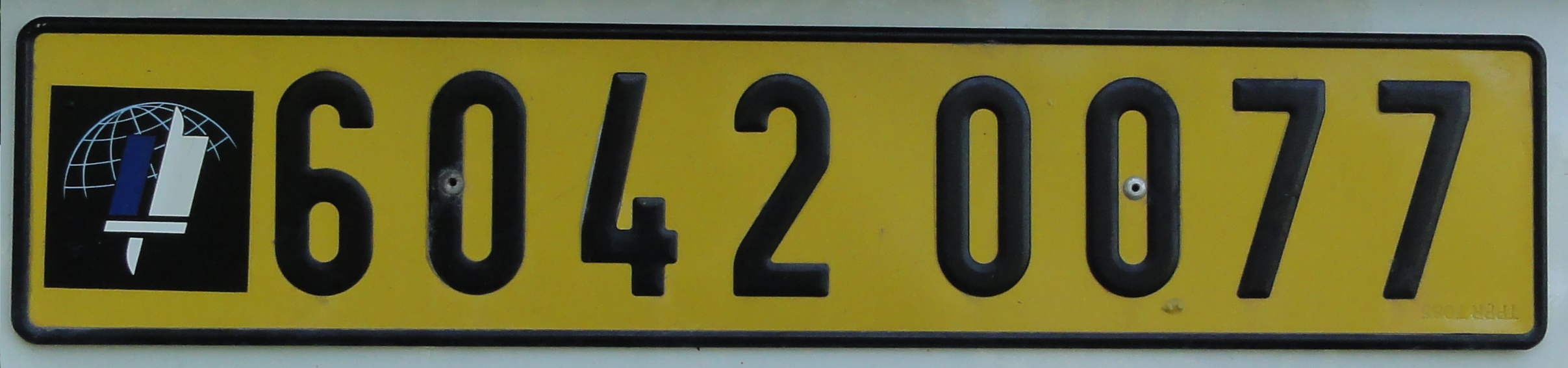
Registration plate of the French Army.

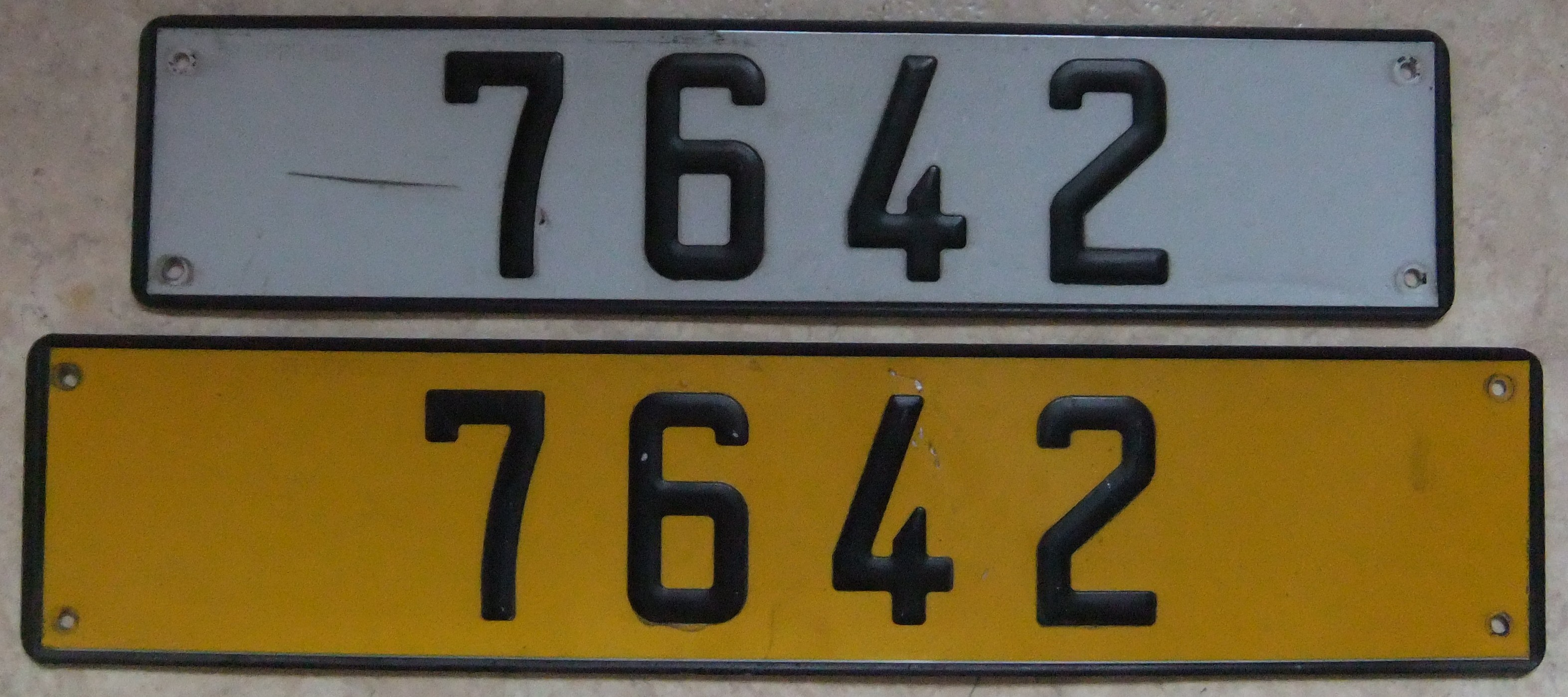
Pre-2003 pair of RATP bus plates.

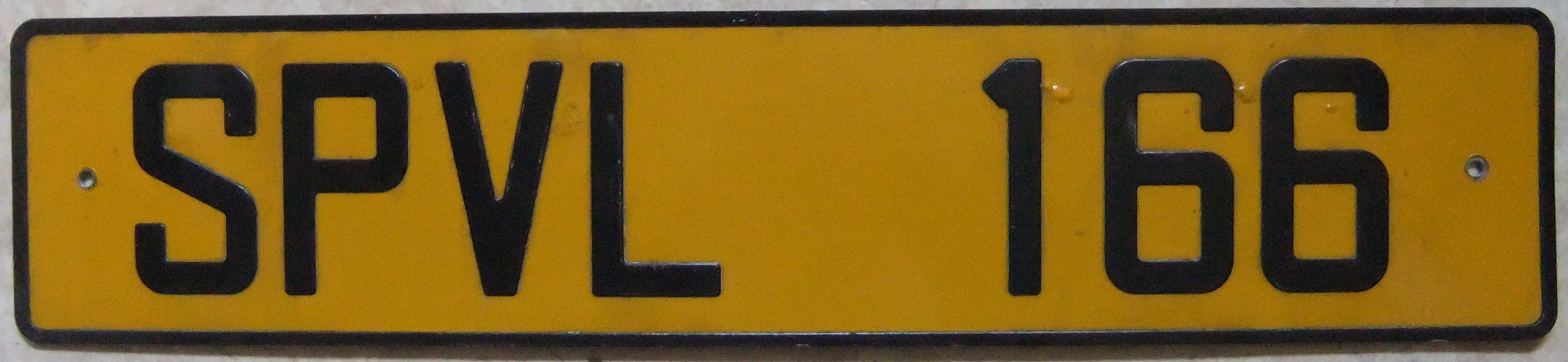
Old brigade of Sapeurs-Pompiers de Paris plate, SPVL mean "Sapeurs-Pompiers Véhicule Léger".

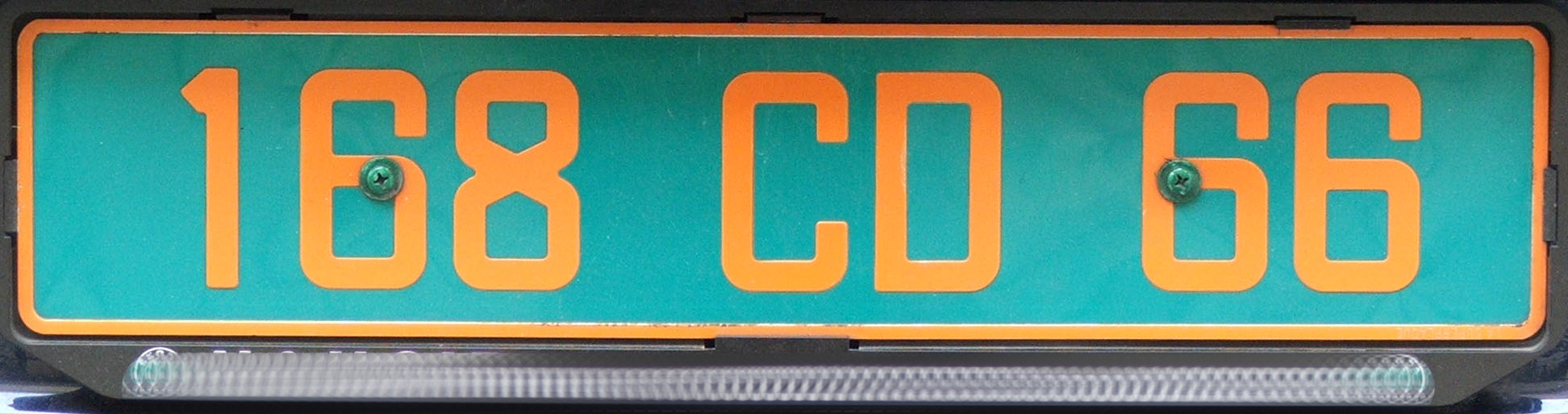
Diplomatic plate for the Czech Republic (168).

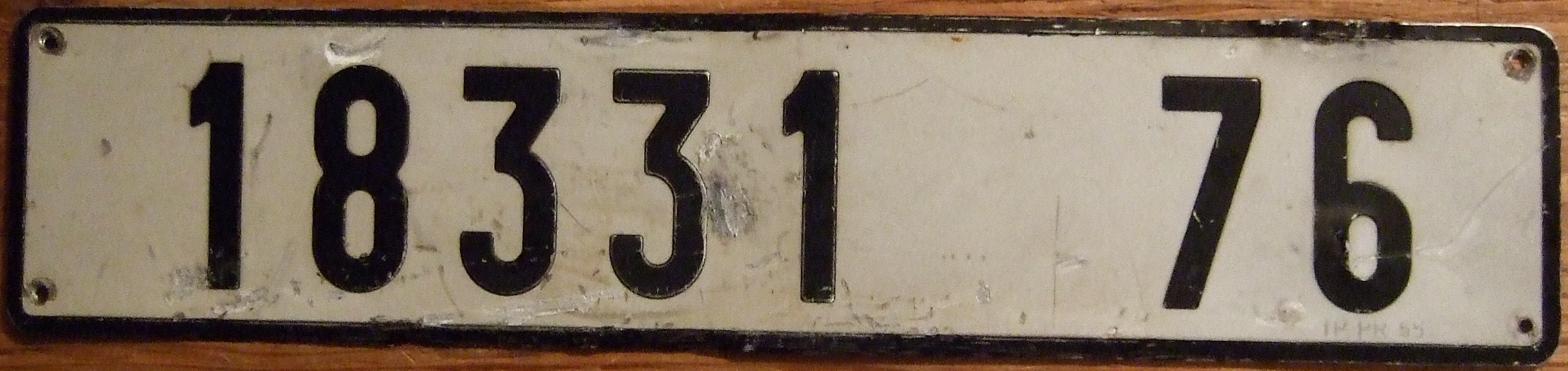
A plate for an agricultural vehicle.

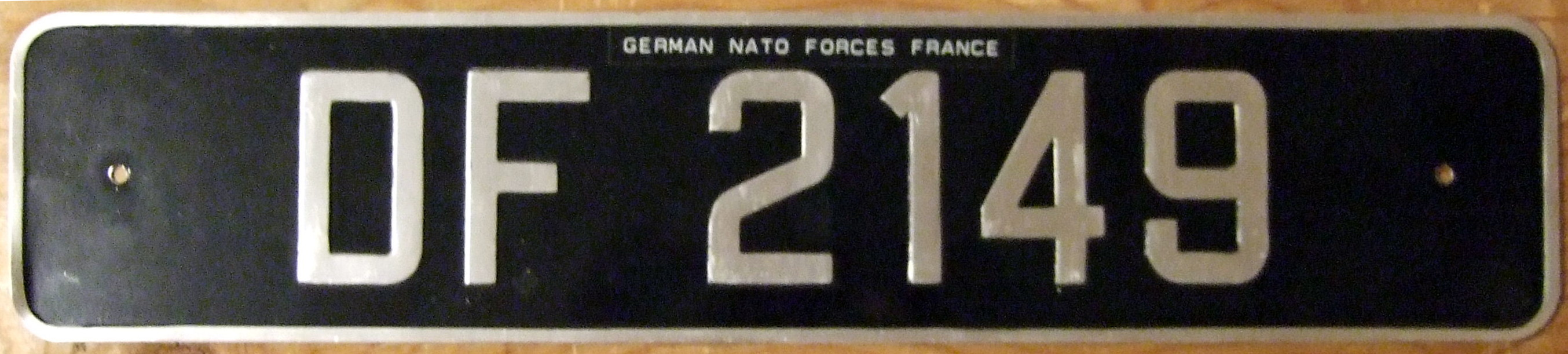
Plate of German military staff in France

A registration plate for French Forces and Civilian Elements stationed in Germany.

Unlike the SIV system, the FNI comprised many special plates.

The state public services, such as the National Police (French: Police nationale), had special plates that comprised the département code; a letter to indicate in which area the vehicle was authorised to travel (D for the département, R for the region, N for the national territory, E for the European Union); a dash; four numbers from 1001 to 9999; and a letter.

The French Armed Forces (French: Forces armées françaises), including the National Gendarmerie (French: Gendarmerie nationale) had a different registration plate with: a number to identify the army unit (2 for Gendarmerie, 6 for the Army (French: Armée de terre), 7 for the Air Force (French: Armée de l'air), 7 for the Navy (French: Marine nationale) and 8 for the General Services); two digits to identify the year of car registration (01 for 2001); a number to identify the type of vehicle (1 for cars and coaches, 3 for lorries, etc.) and four numbers from 0001 to 9999. Registration plates bore the symbol of the army unit the vehicle belonged to, for instance a black anchor on a French flag for the Navy.

The Paris Fire Brigade (French: Brigade des sapeurs-pompiers de Paris), although part of the Armed Forces, had different plates with letters to identify the type of vehicle, for instance PS for first aid, followed by numbers. The Marseille Naval Fire Battalion (French: Bataillon de marins-pompiers de Marseille) used regular plates with the Bouches-du-Rhône département code, while the one in Brest used similar plates as the Navy.

In Paris, RATP buses used special registration plates with only four numbers until March 2003, when standard registration plates were adopted.

Diplomatic cars used green plates with orange or white lettering, depending on the series. Plates comprised one to three numbers identifying the embassy or the international organisation; letters identifying the status (C for consulates, CD for embassies, CMD for ambassadors, K for technical staff); and a series of numbers.

Agricultural vehicles had white or yellow plates with black lettering. They contained one to five numbers identifying the farm and the département code. Several vehicles belonging to the same farm could share the same figures.

German military staff in France used black plates with white characters. Registration plates started with DF followed by a number identifying the headquarters area (0 to 3 for Paris, 4 for Var and 6 to 9 for Strasbourg) and three numbers between 000 and 999.

Vehicles owned by the French Forces and Civilian Elements stationed in Germany (FFECSA) carried a pale blue plate with silver characters. Plates contained a number from 0 to 9; a number identifying the headquarters area (0 for the Comptoir de l'Économat, 1 Baden-Baden, 2 Freiburg im Breisgau, 3 Landau-Pfalz, etc.); a dash; and four numbers between 1001 and 9999.

The President of France could use registration plates ending with PR 75, for instance 9999 PR 75.

==== Temporary plates ====
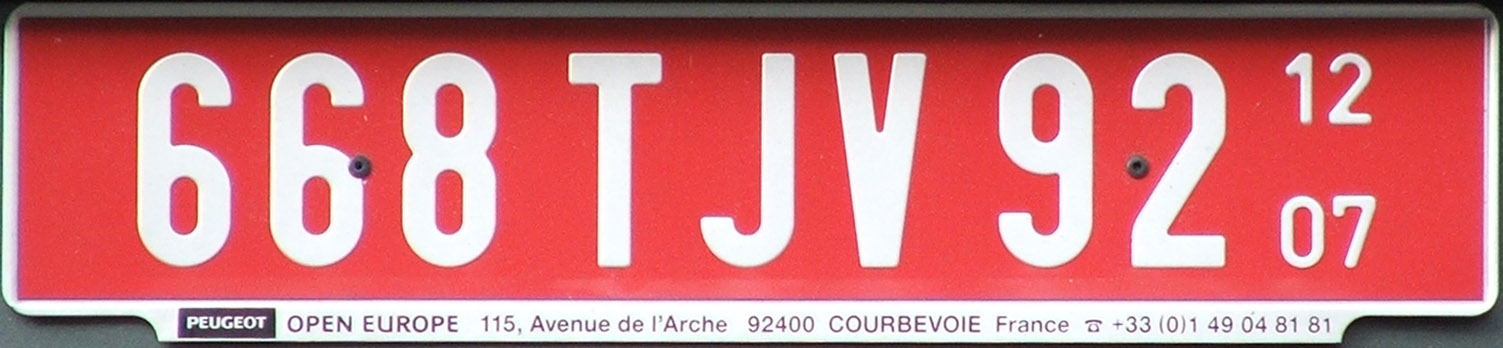
A red provisional plate.

As with the SIV system, the FNI allowed temporary plates for car dealers and mechanics. They contained one to four numbers, the two letters WW and the département code. Some départements used an extra letter after WW. Monaco could use these plates but with a blue background, white lettering and MC instead of the département code.

Duty-free cars purchased abroad or in the free trade zones of Gex and Savoie used red plates with white or silver characters. They contained one to three numbers; three letters between TAA and TZZ; a département code; and an expiry date. Cars bought outside the European Union and registered in Gex and Savoie had plates with five numbers; TT; and a letter identifying the free zone (Q for Savoie and W for Gex). They did not have an expiry date as they were valid as long as the owner resided in a free zone.

== History ==
=== First attempts ===
The very first attempt to register vehicles in France date from the 18th century. In 1749, a Marechaussee officer from Paris suggested a system of vehicle identification to Louis XV. His idea only concerned Paris, where crimes were numerous in the streets. No decision was taken until 1783, when Louis XVI required coachmen to put a metal plate with their name and address on their carriage.

In the 19th century, several French cities implemented local registration systems for carriages. For instance in Lyon, they had to bear a plate with a number to cross the Parc de la Tête d'Or. In 1893, it became mandatory for all cars and carriages in France to have a plate with the name and address of the owner. Registration documents, called carte grise ("grey card"), were created in 1899.

=== 1901 ===
Left: map of the districts and geographical codes used between 1901 and 1919. Right: map of the districts and geographical codes used after 1919.

Following the rapid development of the motor vehicle at the end of the 19th century, French authorities adopted a nationwide registration system in 1901. The 11 September 1901 Circular created a regional system and registration plates contained three numbers followed by a letter identifying a region. In 1899, the Mining Administration had been chosen to approve car engines, and it logically had to attribute the new plates. The administration decided to use its regional mapping and attributed a letter to each of its districts. Each district comprised up to ten départements. They were only used by the Mining Administration and they have nothing to do with present-day French regions.

The system did not offer a wide range of combinations, even if regions could begin a second series of three numbers once they had reached 999 with the first one. The identifying letter had to be doubled to show that a car plate belonged to the second series.

To anticipate any shortage, three regions obtained a second letter in 1904: O for Nancy, K for Poitiers and V for Marseille. Regions were allowed to begin new series of three numbers in 1905. The new ones were distinguished from the original ones by a number between 2 and 9 added after the letter. 1 was probably avoided because it could have been confused with another character such as the I. As Paris was still running up of combinations, four-digit series were allowed locally in 1910.

Temporary registration plates for vehicles for sale were created in 1909. They had the letter W instead of the regional code.

Schematic representations:
456 – M;	Plate from the Marseille region (before 1905)
345 – MM;	Plate from the Marseille region (before 1905, second series)
634 – T3;	Plate from the Toulouse region (after 1905)

Geographical codes in use in 1901
Code	Region	Code	Region	Code	Region
A	Alais (nowadays Alès)	B	Bordeaux	C	Chalon-sur-Saône
D	Douai	E/G/I/U/X	Paris	F	Clermont-Ferrand
H	Chambéry	L	Le Mans	M	Marseille
N	Nancy	P	Poitiers	R	Arras
S	Saint-Étienne	T	Toulouse	Y/Z	Rouen

=== 1919 ===
In 1919, regions were reorganised. Some disappeared while other ones were created. After its reversion to France following World War I, Alsace-Lorraine became the Strasbourg region in 1922. Until then, cars in that region had continued to use German plates with the regional code VI.

Geographical codes in use after 1919–1922
Code	Region	Code	Region	Code	Region
A	Alais	B/P/K	Bordeaux	C/H	Lyon
D	Douai	E/G/I/U/X	Paris	F	Clermont-Ferrand
J	Strasbourg (1922)	L	Nantes	M/V	Marseille (V withdrawn after 1921)
N/O	Nancy (O withdrawn after 1920)	R	Arras	S	Saint-Étienne
T	Toulouse	Y/Z	Rouen		

=== 1928 ===
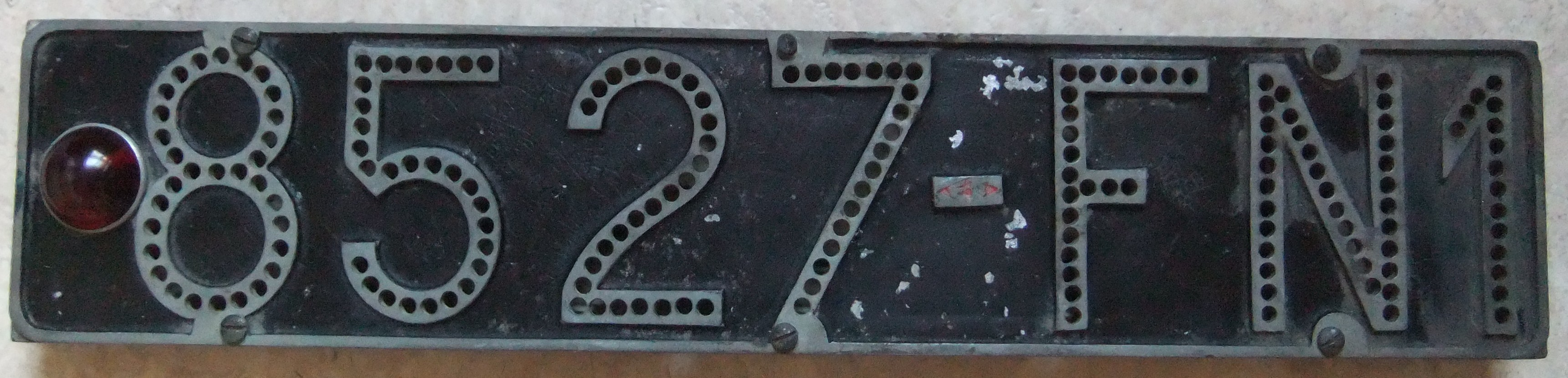
A 1932 Gard department license plate, this model of plate could be lighted from the inside at night.

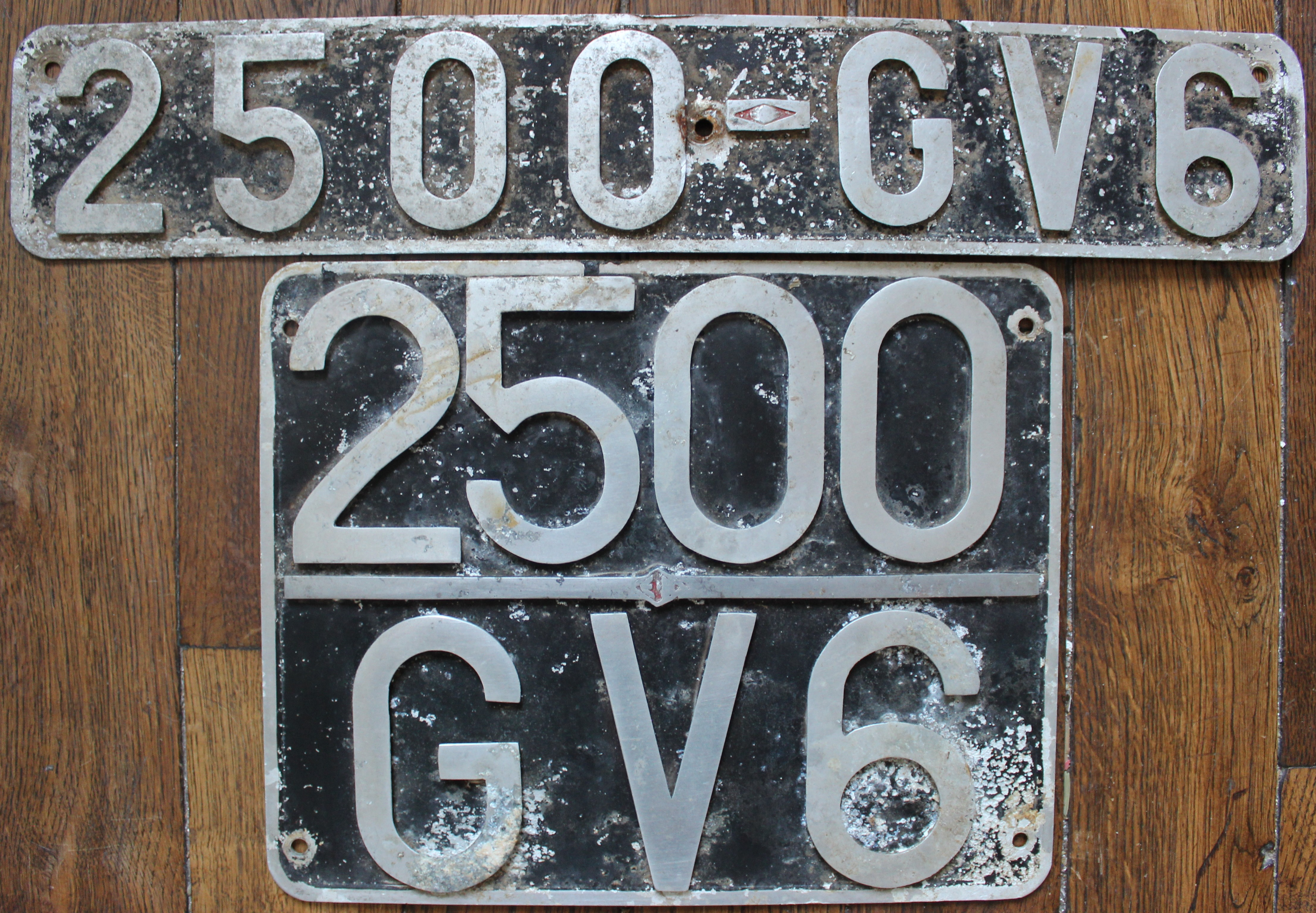
A pair of 1949 Ille-et-Vilaine department license plates.

In 1928, a new system was adopted to replace the first one. It retained its regional characteristic but greatly widened geographic codes. Under the 1928 system, each département obtained its own codes consisting of two letters. The least populated, for instance Cantal and Haute-Loire, received only one code (here CZ and JZ respectively), while most of the départements received several ones. Seine, the most populous one, received several dozen new codes.

The new codes did not use the letters I and O (because they could be confused with the numbers 1 and 0) or W (which was reserved for use on provisional plates). Double letters and letter combinations that designated countries, such as GB for Great Britain, were also avoided. Blocks of codes were allocated to the départements following (for the most part) the alphabetical order of their names. The first département, Ain, thus received AB, AC, AD, and AE, while the last, Yonne, received ZU, ZV and ZY.

As the system lasted only 22 years, a lot of the départements never used all of their codes. Isère, for instance, was allocated HK, HL, HM, HN, HP, and HQ but used only HK.

Registration plates issued after 1928 were similar to the older ones, with one to four numbers followed by the two-letter code. This code could be in turn followed by a number from 1 to 9 for the same purpose as in the 1901 system. The first car registered in Paris obtained 1 RB, and when 999 RB had been reached the following car obtained 1 RB1.

Temporary plates for vehicles in transit on the French territory were created in 1933. They used TT instead of the geographical code. Diplomatic plates were first issued in 1936. They were in dark yellow with white lettering.

Initially planned to last 75 years, the system was withdrawn in 1950. The following format kept the geographical structure but identified départements with numbers rather than letters, allowing a greater range of combinations.

Schematic representations:
7857 – BX;	Plate from Aveyron
4955 – HK9;	Plate from Isère
3178 – ZA1;	Plate from Vaucluse

Geographical codes in use between 1928 and 1950
Code	Region	Code	Region	Code	Region	Code	Region	Code	Region
AB – AE	Ain	AF – AM	Aisne	AN – AQ	Allier	AR	Basses-Alpes	AS	Hautes-Alpes
AT – AU	Ardèche	AV – AY	Ardennes	AZ	Ariège	BA – BM	Alpes-Maritimes	BN – BS	Aube
BT – BV	Aude	BX – BY	Aveyron	BZ	Territoire-de-Belfort	CA – CR	Bouches-du-Rhône	CT – CY	Calvados
CZ	Cantal	DB – DF	Charente	DG – DM	Charente-Inférieure	DN – DQ	Cher	DR – DS	Corrèze
DT	Corse	DU – DZ	Côte-d'Or	EA – EC	Côtes-du-Nord	ED – EF	Creuse	EG – EI	Dordogne
EK – ER	Doubs	ES – EZ	Eure	FA – FD	Drôme	FE – FH	Eure-et-Loir	FJ – FM	Finistère
FN – FR	Gard	FS – FX	Haute-Garonne	FY – FZ	Gers	GA – GN	Gironde	GP – GU	Hérault
GV – GZ	Ille-et-Vilaine	HA – HC	Indre	HD – HJ	Indre-et-Loire	HK – HQ	Isère	HR – HT	Jura
HU – HV	Landes	HX – HZ	Loir-et-Cher	JA – JF	Loire	JG	Haute-Loire	JH – JN	Loire-Inférieure
JP – JS	Loiret	JT – JU	Lot	JV – JY	Lot-et-Garonne	JZ	Lozère	KA – KE	Maine-et-Loire
KF – KH	Manche	KJ – KP	Marne	KQ – KR	Haute-Marne	KS – KT	Mayenne	KU – KZ	Meurthe-et-Moselle
LA – LD	Meuse	LE – LG	Morbihan	LH – LN	Moselle	LP – LQ	Nièvre	LS – LZ	Oise
MB – MV	Nord	MX – MZ	Orne	NA – NG	Pas-de-Calais	NH – NK	Puy-de-Dôme	NM – NR	Basses-Pyrénées
NS	Hautes-Pyrénées	NT – NU	Pyrénées-Orientales	NV – NZ	Bas-Rhin	PB – PD	Haut-Rhin	PF – PZ	Rhône
QA – QC	Haute-Saône	QD – QH	Saône-et-Loire	QJ – QM	Sarthe	QN – QP	Savoie	QR – QT	Haute-Savoie
QU – QZ	Seine-et-Marne	RB – VZ	Seine	XA – XK	Seine-Inférieure	XL – XN	Deux-Sèvres	XP – XU	Somme
XV – XZ	Tarn	YA – YR	Seine-et-Oise	YS – YT	Tarn-et-Garonne	YU – YZ	Var	ZA – ZD	Vaucluse
ZE – ZG	Vendée	ZH – ZK	Vienne	ZL – ZP	Haute-Vienne	ZQ – ZT	Vosges	ZU – ZY	Yonne

== Overseas territories ==
From left to right, top to bottom: car plates from New Caledonia, French Polynesia, Kerguelen Islands and Wallis and Futuna.

Overseas territories of France do not have the same system as continental France, unlike the overseas départements. Overseas territories have diverse statuses and enjoy a large autonomy. They are French Polynesia, Saint Pierre and Miquelon, Wallis and Futuna, Saint Martin, Saint Barthélemy, New Caledonia, the French Southern and Antarctic Lands (TAAF) and Clipperton Island.

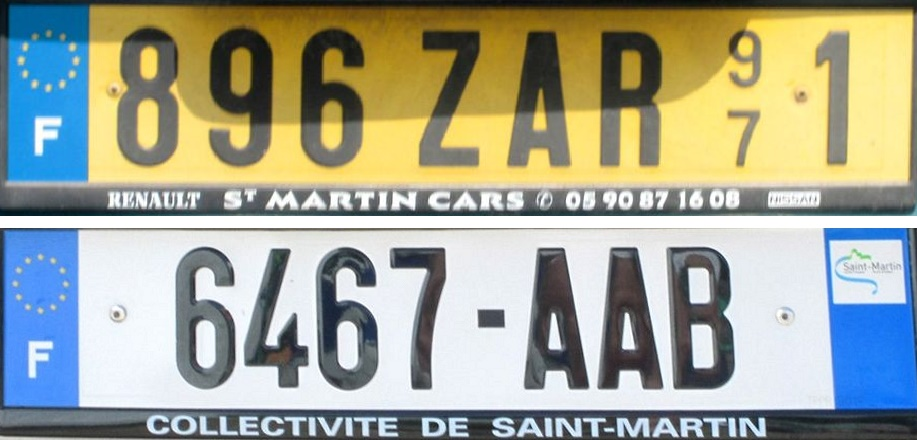
Two plates from Saint Martin. The top one dates from when the island was part of Guadeloupe (971).

Plate sample from French Polynesia (986)

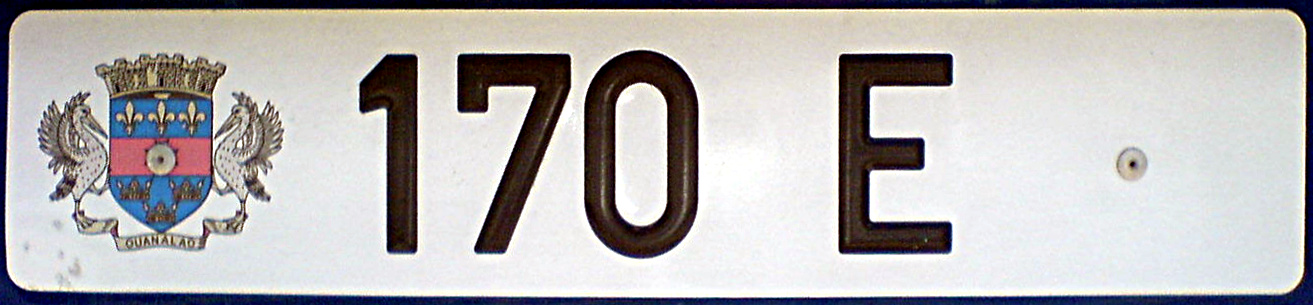
Plate sample from Saint Barthélemy (977)

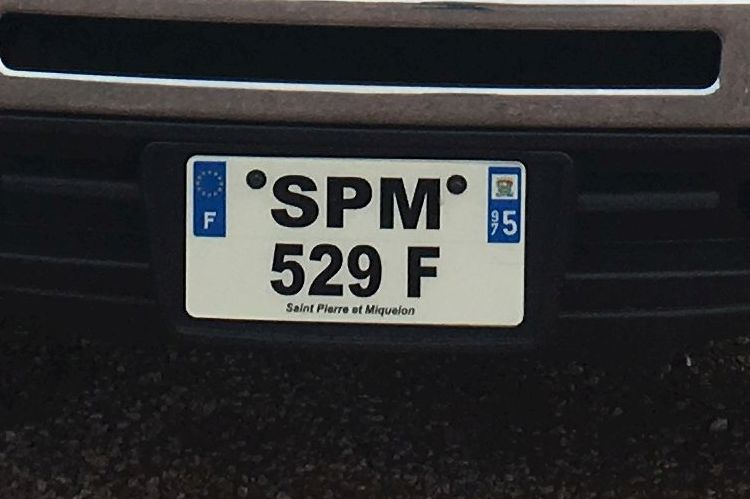
Plate sample from Saint Pierre and Miquelon (975)

- Saint Pierre and Miquelon: white front plate and white or yellow rear plate with black lettering. Contains SPM followed by one to three digits and a letter. SPM 999 A
- Saint Barthélemy: white front plate and white or yellow rear plate with black lettering. Contains one to three digits and a letter. 999 A
- Saint Martin: white front and rear plates. Contains four digits, a dash and three letters. 9999 - AAA
- New Caledonia: white front and rear plate with black lettering. Contains one to six digits followed by NC. 999999 NC
- French Polynesia: white front plate and yellow black plate or black plates with silver lettering. One to six digits followed by P. 999999 P
- French Southern and Antarctic Lands: two digits indicating the year the car was built followed by the four last digits of the serial number of the car. Registration plates are only in use on Kerguelen Islands and are imported from Réunion. They are regular French plates, white with the European strip and the number and symbol of Réunion 99 9999
- Wallis and Futuna: white front plate and yellow black plate or black plates with silver lettering. Contains one to four digits followed by WF. 9999 WF

== Diplomatic codes (pre-2009) ==
Code	Country	Code	Country	Code	Entity
2	South Africa	4	Algeria	5	Germany
6	United States	7	Egypt	9	Argentina
11	Austria	12	Belgium	16	Brazil
20	Cameroon	26	China	28	Colombia
36	Denmark	40	Spain	43	Gabon
45	United Kingdom	46	Greece	53	India
54	Indonesia	59	Israel	60	Italy
62	Japan	63	Jordan	67	Lebanon
69	Libya	76	Morocco	77	Mauritania
78	Mexico	91	Peru	93	Poland
94	Portugal	96	Romania	100	Senegal
105	Switzerland	113	Tunisia	114	Turkey
115	Russia	120	Yugoslavia	180	Eritrea
415	European Union	416	(European Union) Euratom	433	Organisation internationale de la Francophonie
434	International Bureau of Weights and Measures	435	European Molecular Biology Laboratory	431	CERN

== See also ==
- European vehicle registration plates
