= Rebiha Khebtani =

French Algerian politician (1926–2006)

Member of the National Assembly for Sétif
- In office 30 November 1958 – 3 July 1962

Mayor of Sétif
- In office April 1959 – ?

Personal details
- Born: 7 May 1926 Bougie, French Algeria
- Died: 16 January 2006 (aged 79) Le Plessis-Robinson, France
- Party: Unity of the Republic
- Spouse: Abdelkader Khebtani (m. 1941)
- Children: 3

Rebiha Khebtani (7 May 1926 – 16 January 2006) was a French Algerian politician who served in the National Assembly of France from 1958 until 1962. A member of the Unity of the Republic party, she represented the Sétif constituency. Khebtani's position as a Muslim woman in favor of continued union between France and Algeria led to her becoming one of the faces of the Algerian unionist movement.

== Biography ==
=== Early life ===
Rebiha Khebtani was born on 7 May 1926 in the city of Bougie, then part of French Algeria. She was married at the age of 15, having graduated primary school with two years of upper primary education. Her husband, 17-year-old Abdelkader Khebtani, was the son of family friends and had a similar level of education. He later became a successful businessman and public works contractor, while Khebtani was a housewife and the caretaker for their three children.

Khebtani was encouraged to enter politics by her husband; both were Algerian Muslims supportive of the French government. During the May 1958 crisis, the Khebtanis became members of the local Committee of Public Safety in Sétif; these committees, which were founded in every major Algerian town, were unionist organizations calling for the installment of Charles de Gaulle as president of France. During this period, Khebtani also removed her veil as part of broader "un-veiling ceremonies organized by the colonial authorities".

=== Political career ===
In the 1958 French legislative election, Khebtani was elected to the National Assembly of France, representing the Sétif constituency as a member of the Unity of the Republic party, a "pro-Gaullist list promoting national reconciliation". In April 1959, Khebtani was also elected mayor of Sétif, despite garnering criticism from residents of European descent, who viewed her as "an intruder ... forced upon the town by de Gaulle's administration". Two months after her election as mayor, her brother was assassinated by pro-independence rebels in the city.

Khebtani was one of just five women in parliament during the 1958–1962 session; two of the others, Kheira Bouabsa and Nafissa Sid Cara, were fellow Algerian Muslims who were also staunchly unionist. The trio attracted outsized attention throughout their tenure simply for their presence in parliament. Saliha Belmessous, a historian at the University of New South Wales, considers their election to have been a "propaganda coup for the French authorities", with much focus placed on their appearance; according to Belmessous, Khebtani was "presented as a blonde pin-up girl, with her bleached hair, her low-cut neckline and her leopard-skin blouse". French politicians lauded the trio as "models for emancipated Algerian women", and in a society where the unveiling of Muslim women had become "politicized and fetishized", their presence in parliament was "the ultimate unveiling, out of the anonymous white haïk of tradition and bareheaded into the spotlight of modern democracy".

However, the trio also received criticism from pro-independence figures and the French Left. The National Liberation Front (FLN), the primary organization fighting for Algerian independence, stated that the three were "traitors to religion and the fatherland" and frequently singled them out in their propaganda. The leader of the French Communist Party, Waldeck Rochet, also accused the trio of "having been elected under the control of the army and thus of not being legitimate representatives of the Algerian people". In a speech responding to criticism from Francis Leenhardt, the leader of the Socialist parliamentary group, Khebtani stated:

Mister Prime Minister, my dear colleagues [she began], a year ago, I was still a veiled woman. I am today the elected representative of a department of more than one million Muslim French people and only 24,000 European French. And, despite the opinion of our colleague Leenhardt, I regard myself as just as valuable as the other metropolitan deputies. I am proud to be in the French National Assembly, the spokeswoman of all those who, in the department of Sétif, the rebel stronghold, have definitively broken with a time gone by, and have decided to build the future of Algeria through France, with France, and within France.

Despite these criticisms, Khebtani accomplished several policy goals throughout her tenure. Among her accomplishments were the promotion of "policies aimed at lifting the social and economic conditions of Muslim people", the easement of "prison conditions for Muslim detainees through the distribution of food packages during Ramadan", and the "early release of a number of FLN supporters of the Sétif region". Khebtani also represented France at the United Nations General Assembly, rallying international support for the French cause during the Algerian War. The parliamentary tenure of Khebtani and the other French Algerian MPs ended on 3 July 1962, the day France declared Algeria to be independent.

=== Death ===
Khebtani died on 16 January 2006 in Le Plessis-Robinson, a suburb of Paris.
