= November 1946 French legislative election in Algeria =

Elections to the National Assembly of France were held in Algeria on 10 November 1946. The election was held with two colleges, citizens and non-citizens. Republican Rally and Algerian Unity won the most seats in the first college, whilst the Movement for the Triumph of Democratic Liberties won the most seats in the second college.

== Results ==
=== First college ===
Party	Algiers			Constantine			Oran			Total seats
Party	Votes	%	Seats	Votes	%	Seats	Votes	%	Seats	Total seats
Republican Rally and Algerian Unity	103,668	66.2	5	–	–	–	–	–	–	5
United Republican Party	–	–	–	46,955	64.9	3	–	–	–	3
Democratic Union for Progress and Freedom	37,293	23.8	1	11,242	15.5	0	36,331	28.6	1	2
French Section of the Workers' International	15,610	10.0	0	14,226	19.6	1	23,230	18.2	1	2
Republican Union for the Safeguarding of French Algeria	–	–	–	–	–	–	45,748	36.0	2	2
French and Republican Rally for the defence of Algeria	–	–	–	–	–	–	21,832	17.2	1	1
Invalid/blank votes	2,143	–	–	1,659	–	–	2,052	–	–	–
Total	158,714	100	6	74,082	100	4	129,193	100	5	15
Source: Sternberger et al.

=== Second college ===
Party	Algiers			Constantine I			Constantine II			Constantine III			Oran			Total seats
Party	Votes	%	Seats	Votes	%	Seats	Votes	%	Seats	Votes	%	Seats	Votes	%	Seats	Total seats
MTLD	99,792	44.8	2	21,852	28.7	0	37,930	85.2	3	–	–	–	–	–	–	5
ADSM	108,812	48.8	3	–	–	–	–	–	–	–	–	–	–	–	–	3
PCA	14,161	6.4	0	4,345	5.7	0	6,582	14.8	0	23,130	38.4	1	34,607	40.2	1	2
DFA	–	–	–	49,981	65.6	2	–	–	–	–	–	–	–	–	–	2
UFMDI	–	–	–	–	–	–	–	–	–	–	–	–	51,384	59.8	2	2
Algerian Charter	–	–	–	–	–	–	–	–	–	37,126	61.6	1	–	–	–	1
Invalid/blank votes	1,914	–	–	596	–	–	625	–	–	732	–	–	1,932	–	–	–
Total	224,679	100	5	76,774	100	2	45,137	100	3	60,988	100	2	85,923	100	3	15
Source: Sternberger et al.
