= ADSM =

ADSM may refer to:

- ad sectam, legal term
- ADSL Mobile, Italian mobile telecommunications company
- Abu Dhabi Securities Market, stock exchange in the UAE
- Active disassembly using smart materials, developing technology for re-use of materials
- Active Duty Service Member, Full-time occupation within a military force
- Adstar Distributed Storage Manager, an IBM data protection platform
- Air Defense Suppression Missile, variant of the Stinger surface-to-air missile
- American Defense Service Medal, military award established by Franklin D. Roosevelt
- A political party in the November 1946 French legislative election in Algeria
- Asynchronous delta-sigma modulation
