= Bône (département) =

Former French department in Algeria (1955–1962)

Bône département is identified on this map as "9C". "9C" was also the number by which the department was identified on automobile license plates and in other places where a departmental code was used.

Bône ([bon], Arabic: عنابة ‘Annāba) was a French département in Algeria which existed between 1955 and 1962.

Considered as a French province, Algeria was departmentalised on 9 December 1848. Three civil zones (départements) replaced the three beyliks into which the Ottoman former rulers had divided the territory. The easternmost of the three original Algerian departments was called Constantine. For over a century the town of Annaba, known at that time as Bône (and in classical times as Hippo), was a sub-prefecture in the département of Constantine: this changed in 1955.

On 7 August 1955 the eastern extremity of the former département of Constantine was split off and became the separate département of Bône. This administrative reorganisation was a response to the rapid population increase experienced across the territory, especially during the preceding decade.

The new coastal département of Bône covered an area of 25,367 square kilometres (9,794 sq mi); a population of 730,594 was recorded. The department comprised five sub-prefectures: these were La Calle, Clairfontaine, Guelma, Souk Ahras and Tébessa. A final but temporary change took place between 17 March 1958 and 7 November 1959, during which time the Tébessa sub-prefectures was transferred to the département of Batna.

In 1962 Bône département was renamed Annaba département.

The département of Annaba remained in existence until after the independence of Algeria and subsequently became Annaba Province.
