= Batna (département) =

Coordinates: 35°33′42.7″N 6°10′39.9″E

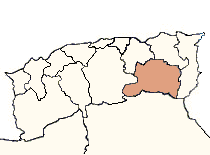
Map in 1962

Batna ([bat.na], Arabic: باتنة Bātna) is a former French département in Algeria. The département of Batna existed between 1957 and 1974.

== History ==
Considered as an integral piece of French territory, Algeria was departmentalised on 9 December 1848, and thereby was administratively structured in the same way as metropolitan France. Three civil zones (départements) replaced the three beyliks into which the Ottoman former rulers had divided the territory. The easternmost of the three original Algerian departments was called Constantine. For over a century the town of Batna, was a sub-prefecture in the département of Constantine: this changed in 1957.

On 20 May 1957 the Batna sub-prefecture was split off and became a separate département. This administrative reorganisation was undertaken in response to the rapid population increase experienced across the territory, especially during the preceding decade. The new département of Batna was located directly to the south of the newly created département of Sétif and the newly diminished département of Constantine.

The département of Batna covered an area of 38,494 km^{2} (14,863 sq mi): a population of 529,532 was recorded. The department comprised five sub-prefectures: these were Arris, Barika, Biskra, Corneille and Khenchela.

The 1957 departmental reorganisation was marked by a change in the "suffix" number appearing on automobile license plates and in other places that used the same code. Until 1957, as part of the département of Constantine, Batna was identified by the department number "93": after 1957 the département of Batna became department number "9B". (In 1968, under a law enacted in 1964, the number "93" would be reallocated to a new département comprising the northern suburbs of Paris.)

After independence the department continued to exist until 1974 when it was split into Batna Province, Biskra Province, Djelfa Province, M'Sila Province and Tébessa Province.
