= El Massa =

Algerian daily newspaper

El Massa المساء
- Type: Daily newspaper
- Format: Berliner
- Owner: EURL El Massa
- Editor: Abderrahmane Tigane
- Founded: 1 October 1985; 40 years ago
- Political alignment: Centre
- Language: Arabic
- Headquarters: Maison de la presse Abdelkader Safir, Kouba, Algiers
- Price: DA10 (Saturday-Thursday) €1.00 (Europe)
- Website: El Massa Unlimited

El Massa (in Arabic المساء meaning The Evening) is an Algerian daily newspaper printed in Arabic.

== History and profile ==
El Massa was started in 1985 as the first Algerian newspaper to be published in an evening edition. The paper is published by and supportive of the Algerian government.

== See also ==
- List of Algerian newspapers
- Dhaya
