= Dhaya =

Lake in Médéa Province, Algeria

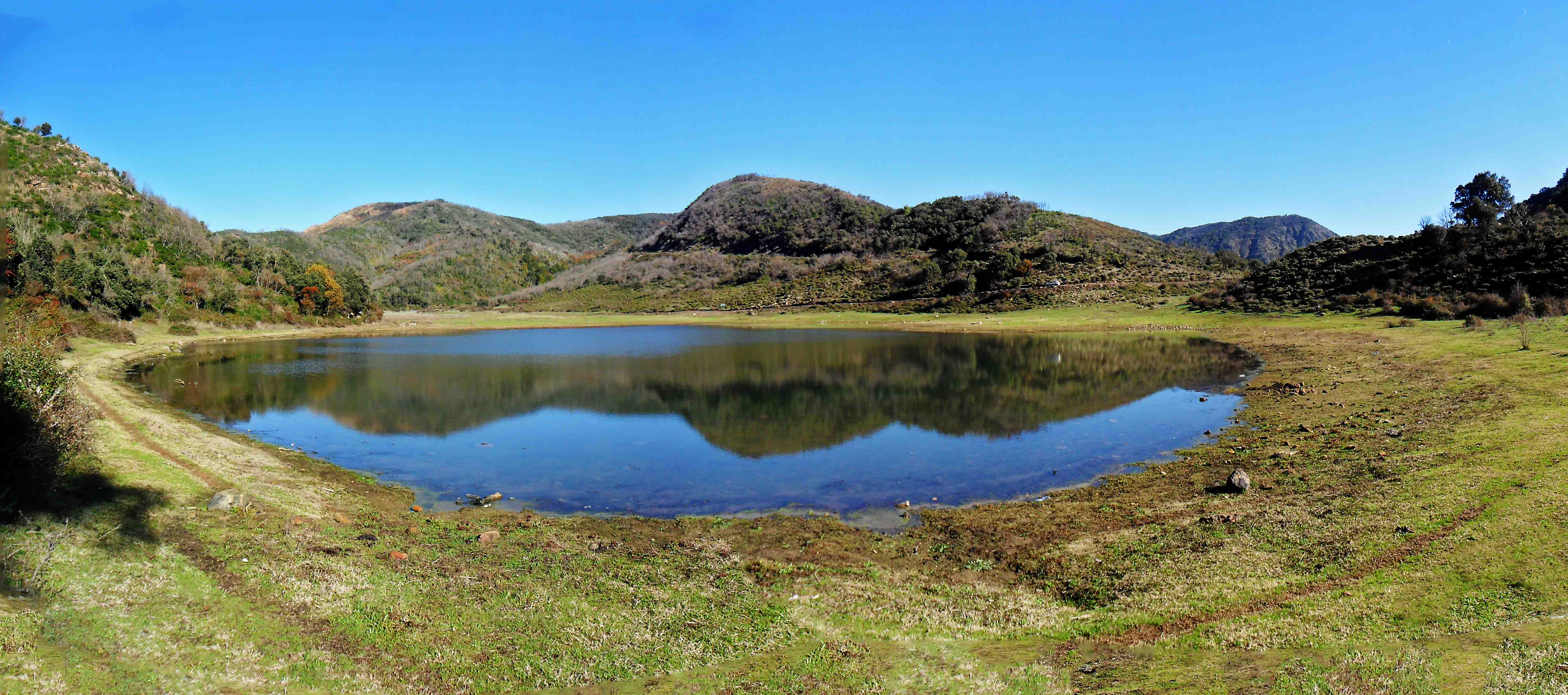
- Interactive map of Dhaya
- Location: Tamesguida, Algeria
- Coordinates: 36°22′00″N 2°41′30″E
- Settlements: Médéa Province

Al Dhaya is a lake in located in Tamesguida, Medea , Algeria. It has an altitude of 1200 meters above sea level, on the borders of the provinces of Medea and Medea. It is considered by El Massa as one of the highest lakes above ground level in Algeria and North Africa.

== Gallery ==
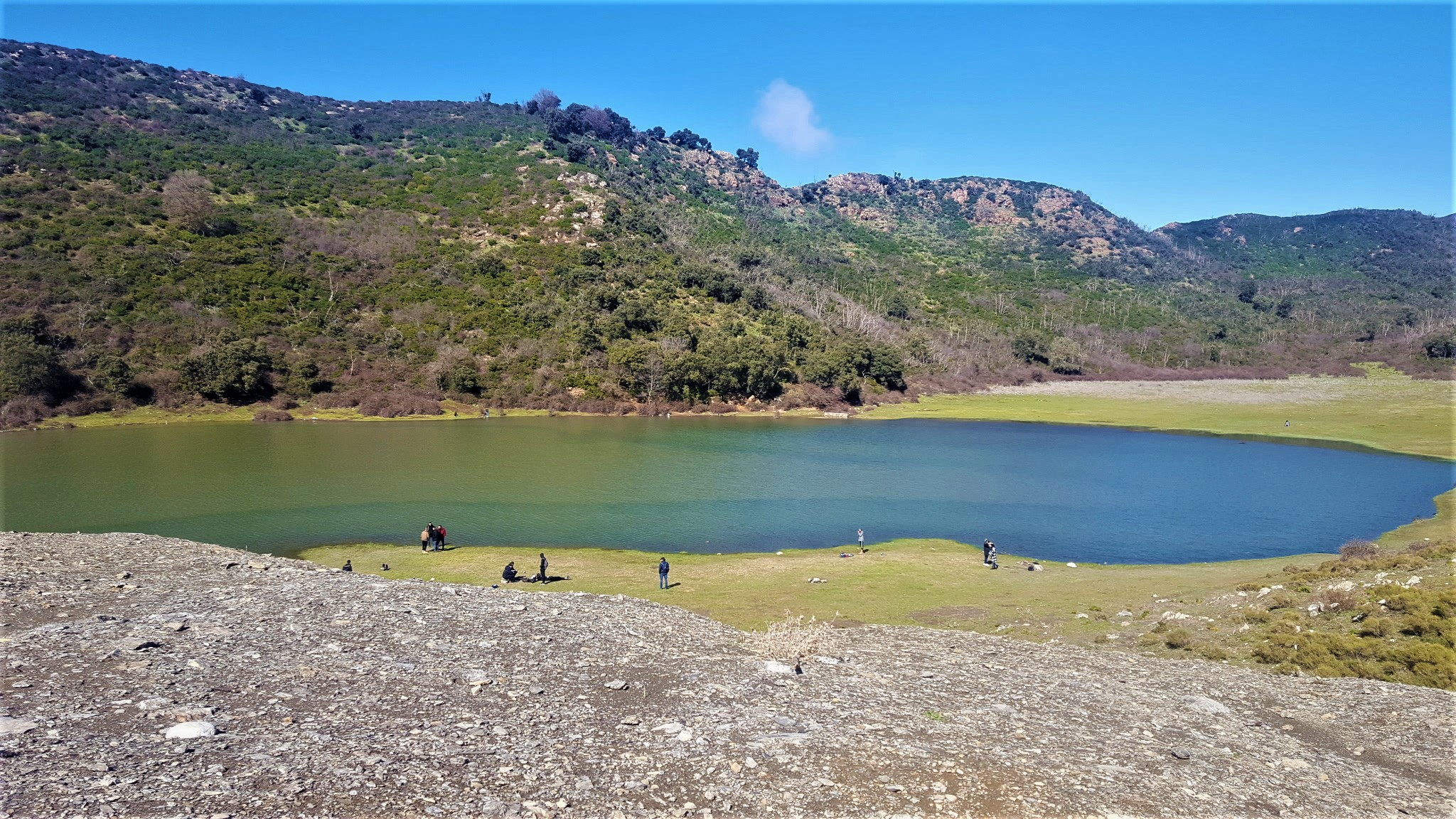

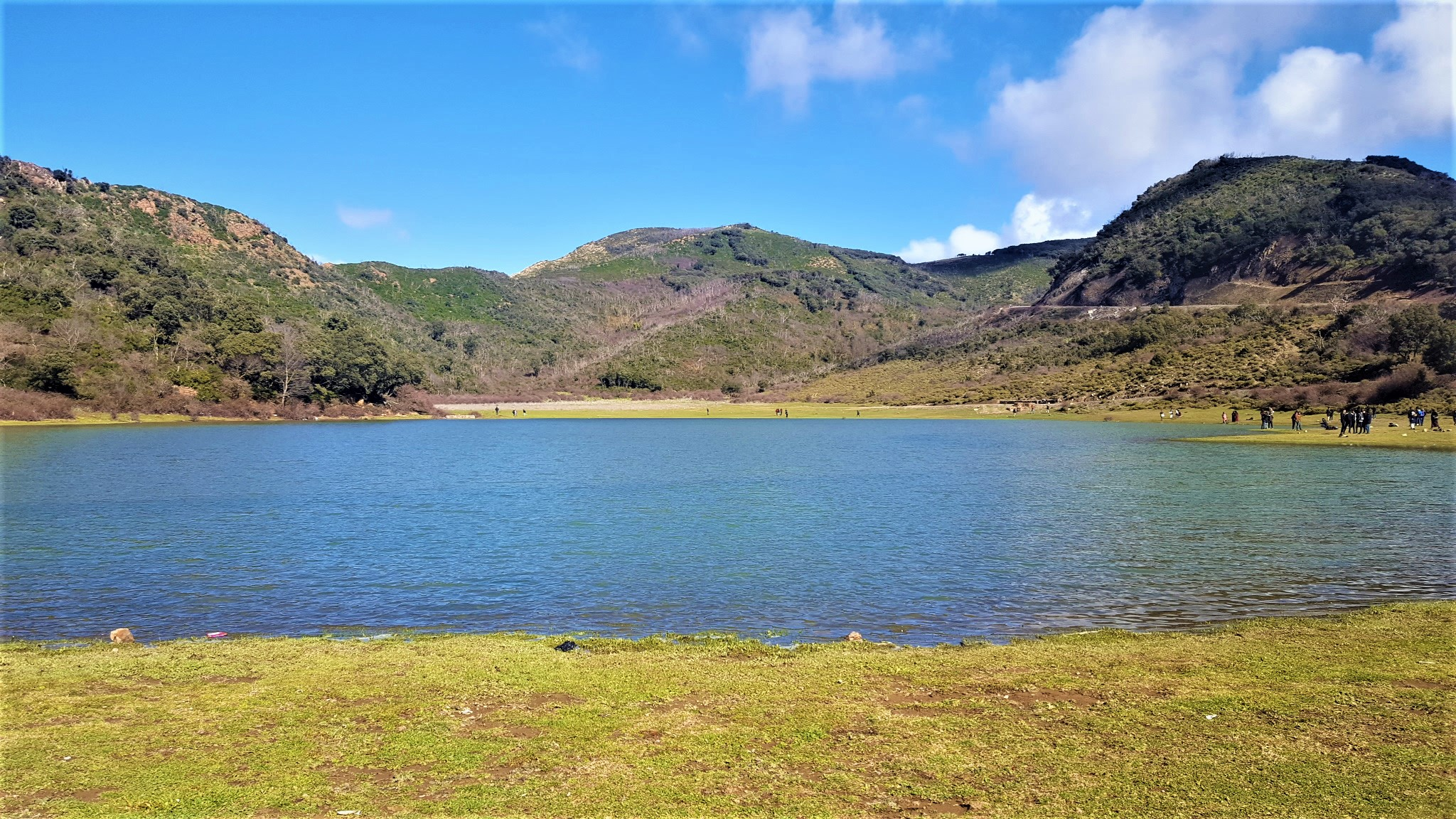

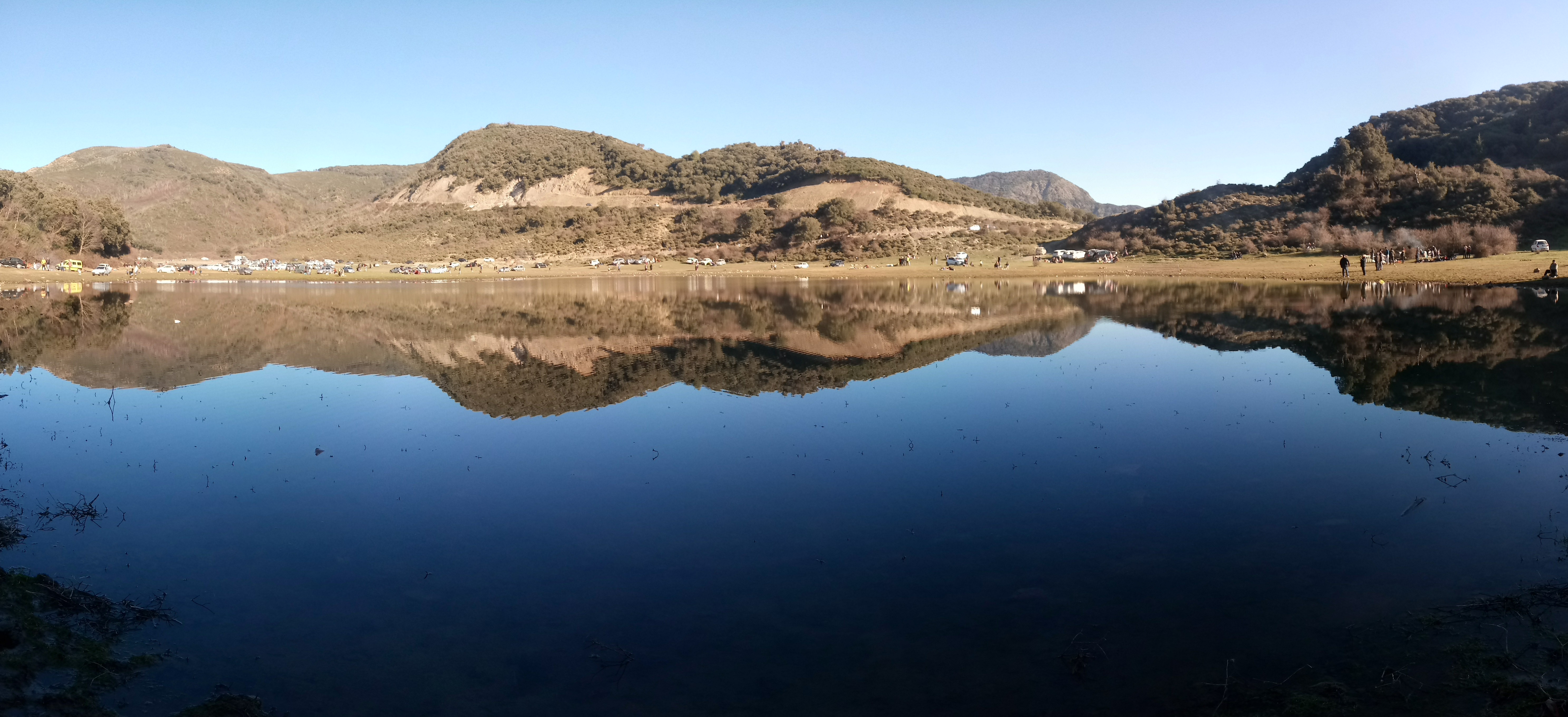

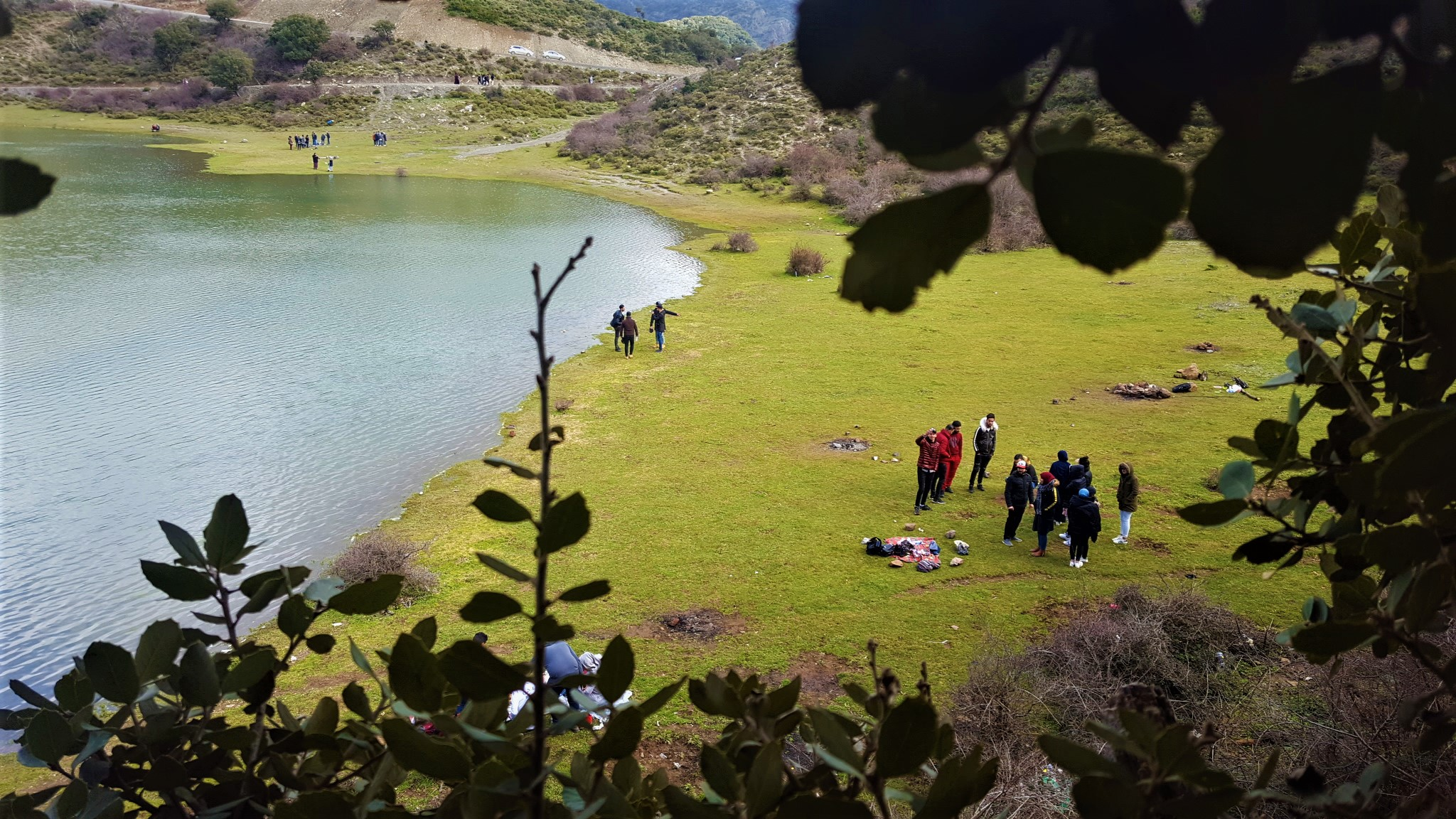

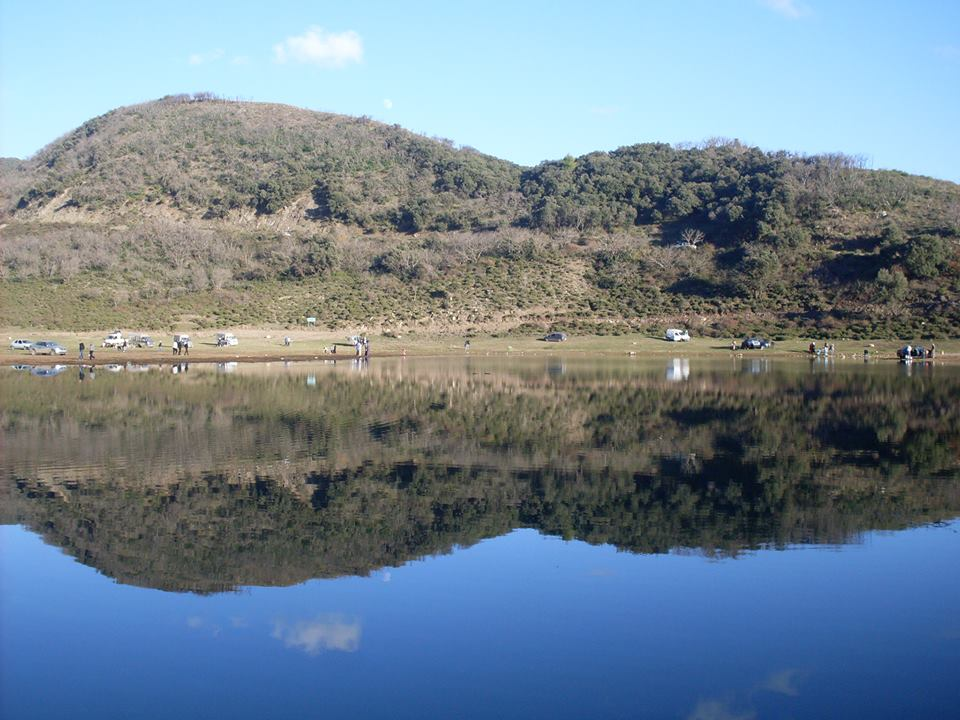

== See also ==
- Chott Melrhir
- Sabkha Zamoul
- Ben Aknoun Forest
