= Alger (department) =

Former Algerian department in Algeria (1848–1962)

Coordinates: 36°44′37.1″N 3°5′41.1″E

Department of Algiers
- Administrative map of French Algeria from 1934 to 1955, showing the Alger department in pink
- Capital: Algiers
- Area
  - 1954: 54,861 km^{2} (21,182 sq mi)
- Population
  - 1954: 645,479
- Today part of: Algeria

The Department of Algiers (French: département d'Alger, [depaʁtəmɑ̃ dalʒe], Arabic: عمّالة الجزائر) was a former French department in Algeria. The department of Alger existed between 1848 and 1974.

Considered a French province, Algeria was departmentalized on December 9, 1848. The departments created on this date were the civil zone of the three provinces corresponding to the beyliks of the Regency of Algiers recently conquered. Consequently, the city of Algiers was made prefecture of the department bearing its name, then covering the center of Algeria, leaving the Constantine Department to the east and the department of Oran to the west.

== The origin of the administrative divisions ==
Considered as a French province, Algeria was departmentalized on 9 December 1848, thereby operating according to the same administrative structure as metropolitan France. Three civil zones (départements) replaced the three beyliks into which the Ottoman former rulers had divided the territory. The principal town of the central department, also called Alger, became the prefecture of the eponymous department. The two other Algerian departments were Oran in the west and Constantine in the east.

== Size and structure of the department ==
The department of Alger covered an area of 54,861 km^{2} (21,182 sq mi), and comprised six sub-prefectures: these were Aumale, Blida, Médéa, Miliana, Orléansville and Tizi-Ouzou.

It was not until the 1950s that the Sahara was annexed into departmentalized Algeria, which explains why the department of Alger was limited to what is the north-central part of Algeria today. Until 10 January 1957, when the Sahara regions received their own administrative structure, these territories were administered by the département of Alger.

== Religious affiliations ==
The 1954 census recorded the stated religious affiliations of the population. The majority in the department of Alger declared themselves to be Muslims. In the city of Algiers itself, however, 296,041 or 46% of the 645,479 people counted were declared to be non-Muslims. This placed Alger second only to the city of Oran in terms of the proportion of the population stating that they were non-Moslems. Non-Moslem appears to have been seen as a surrogate description for people of European origin, or for Algerian Jews.

== Reorganization and independence ==
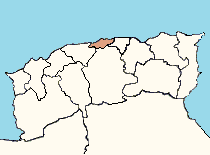
Map of the Alger department after the reorganisation of 1956

On 26 January 1956 population increases triggered the creation of three new stand-alone departments. These were the department of Médéa, along with the coastal departments of Orléansville and Tizi-Ouzou formed respectively from the southern, western and eastern portions of the department of Alger.

The very much truncated department of Alger now covered just 3,393 km^{2}, and was home to a population of 1,079,806. It was subdivided into the two sub-prefectures of Blida and Maison-Blanche (modern Dar El Beïda).

The 1957 departmental reorganization was marked by a change in the "suffix" number appearing on automobile license plates and in other places that used the same code. Until 1957 Alger was department number "91": after 1957 the much diminished department of Alger became department number "9A". (In 1968, under a law enacted in 1964, the number "91" would be reallocated to Essonne, a new department comprising the southern suburbs of Paris.)

After independence the department continued to exist until 1974 when it was split into Algiers Province and Blida Province.

== People ==
- Mohamed Deriche (1865-1948), Algerian politician;
- Mohamed Seghir Boushaki (1869-1959), Algerian politician;
- Lyès Deriche, 20th-century leader of the Algerian national political movement against the French.

== See also ==
- Départementalisation de l'Algérie française.
- Dhaya
