= Constantine Department =

French département in Algeria

Department of Constantine Département de Constantine عمالة قسنطينة
- Department of France
- Administrative map of French Algeria from 1934 to 1955, showing the Constantine Department in pink
- Capital: Constantine
- Area
- Area transferred
  - 7 August 1955: North-eastern coastline to Bône Department
  - May 1957: Southern region to Batna Department
  - May 1957: Western region to Sétif Department
  - 1848: 87,578 km^{2} (33,814 sq mi)
  - 1955: 19,899 km^{2} (7,683 sq mi)
- Population
  - 1955: 1,208,355
- Number plate code: 93
- History
  - Established: 9 December 1848
  - Disestablished: 1974
- Subdivisions
  - Type: Arrondissements
  - Units: Aïn Beïda; Aïn M'lila; Collo; Djidjelli; El Milia; Mila; Philippeville
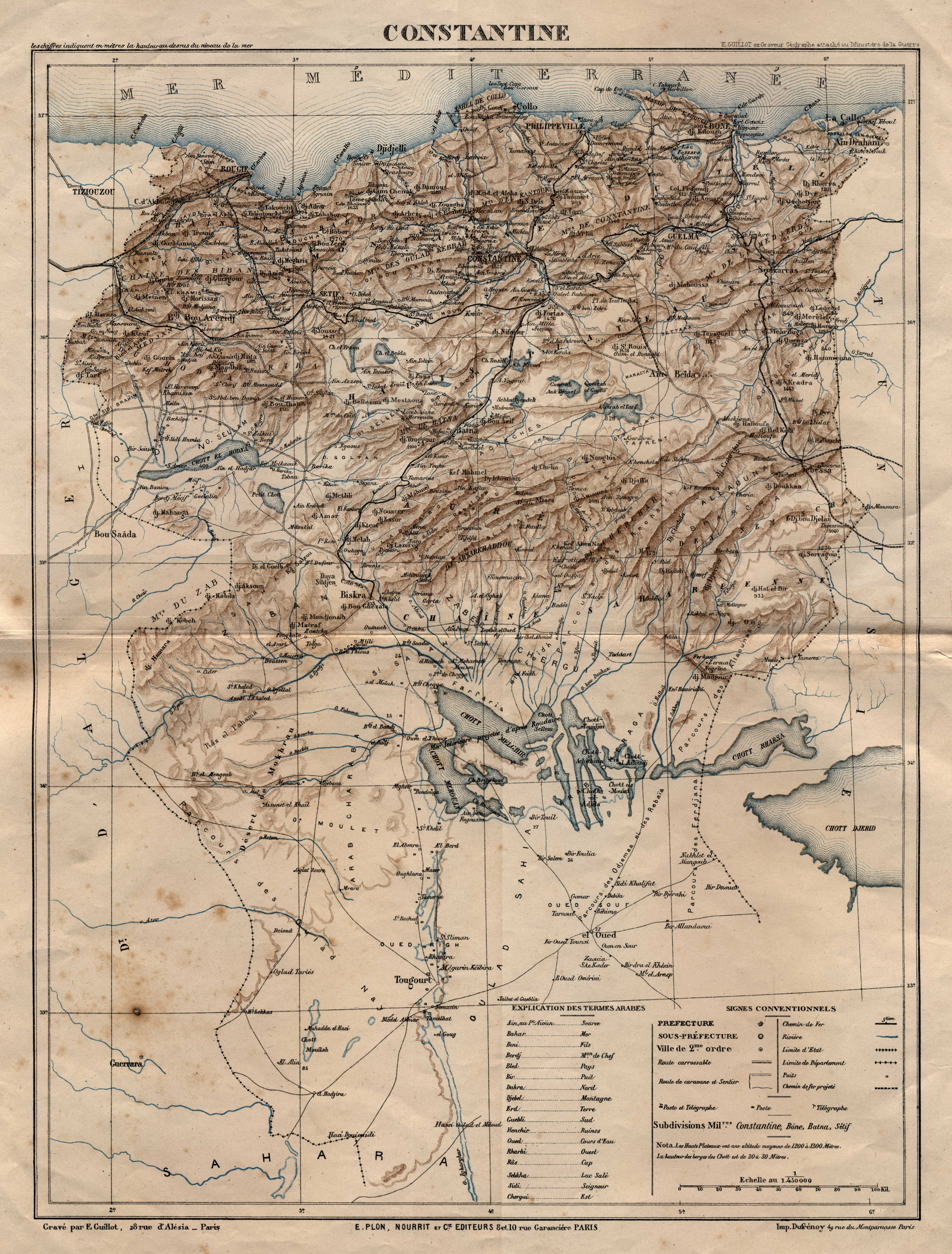
- Map showing the department's subprefectures
Preceded by
Beylik of Constantine
Succeeded by
Constantine Province
Jijel Province
Oum el Bouaghi Province
Skikda Province
- Today part of: Algeria

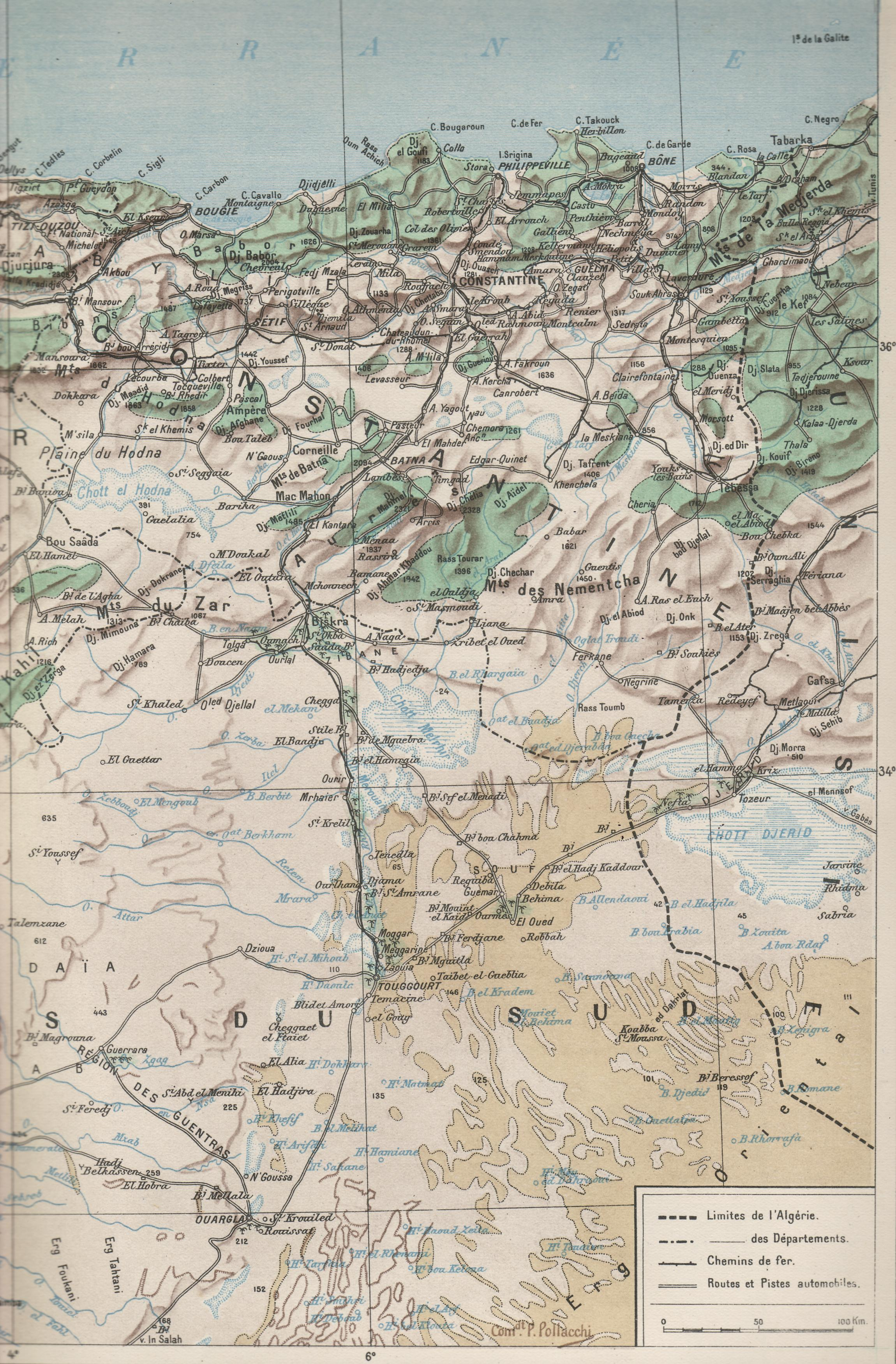
Geographical map of the departement of Constantine in 1930

Constantine Department (French: Département de Constantine; Arabic: عمالة قسنطينة) was a French département in Algeria during the colonial period, which existed between 1848 and 1974. The area of the former department, centered on the city of Constantine, is also referred to as Constantinois (Arabic: قسنطينة Qusanṭīnah).

== History ==
Constantinois was part of the Roman province of Africa which also included areas to the east (what is today Tunisia and Tripolitania [western Libya]). In the Middle Ages, it was part of Ifriqiya which was largely coterminous with the Roman province.

Under Ottoman rule, Constantinois was attached to the Regency of Algiers and ruled by a bey appointed by the dey of Algiers. The last bey, Ahmed Bey, who ruled from 1826 to 1848, led the local population in a fierce resistance to the French occupation forces after their invasion in 1830. In 1837, the territory was finally conquered by the French, who reinstated the bey as ruler of the region. He remained in this position until 1848, when the region became a part of the colony of Algiers and he was deposed.

=== Formation ===
Considered a French province, Algeria was departmentalised on 9 December 1848. Three civil zones (départements) replaced the three beyliks into which the Ottoman former rulers had divided the territory. The principal town of the eastern département, also called Constantine, became the prefecture of the eponymous département. The two other Algerian departments were Oran in the west and Alger in the centre.

Constantine covered an area of 87,578 km^{2}, and comprised six arrondissements: these were Batna, Bône, Bougie, Guelma, Philippeville and Sétif.

It was not until the 1950s that the Sahara was annexed into departmentalised Algeria, which explains why the eastern département of Constantine was limited to what is the north-east of Algeria today.

=== Reorganisations and Algerian independence ===
On 7 August 1955 the eastern extremity of the département of Constantine was split off and became the separate département of Bône. Less than two years later, in May 1957, population increases triggered the creation of the stand-alone departments of Sétif and of Batna from the western and southern portions of the département of Constantine.

The much truncated coastal département of Constantine now covered just 19,899 km^{2}, and was home to a population of 1,208,355. It was redivided into seven arrondissements: these were Aïn Beïda, Aïn M'lila, Collo, Djidjelli, El-Milia, Mila and, as before, Philippeville.

The 1957 departmental reorganisation was marked by a change in the "suffix" number appearing on automobile license plates and in other places that used the same code. Until 1957 Constantine was department number "93": after 1957 the much diminished département of Constantine became department number "9D". (In 1968, under a law enacted in 1964, the number "93" would be reallocated to a new département comprising the northern and north-eastern suburbs of Paris.)

After independence the department continued to exist until 1974 when it was split into Constantine Province, Jijel Province, Oum el Bouaghi Province and Skikda Province.

== See also ==
- Départements français d'Algérie (not yet translated into English).
