= Kheira Bouabsa =

French politician

Deputymember of France
- In office December 1958 – July 1962

Senator of France
- In office July 1959 – March 1961

Personal details
- Born: February 4, 1931 Mascara, French Algeria
- Died: September 20, 2021 (aged 90) Issy-les-Moulineaux, France

Kheira Bouabsa (4 February 1931 – 20 September 2021) was a French politician and National Assembly Representative of the 1st Legislature of the French Fifth Republic, and Senator of the French Algeria circonscription.

== Biography ==
Bouabsa was born on 4 February 1931 in Mascara, French Algeria. At the age of 27, Kheira Bouabsa was second on the “Rénovation” list led by Armand Legroux in the 11th constituency of French Algeria, which included Mascara, Palikao, Inkermann, and Relizane. In November 1959, she served as rapporteur for opinion on the appropriations planned for a 1960 finance bill, regarding the State Secretariat for Algerian Affairs, and on the bill fixing the civil credits allocated to Algeria for 1960. By the end of the Algerian War , the Algerian circonscription to the Senate of France was dissolved in March 1961, and she subsequently ended her political career.

She died on 20 September 2021, in Issy-les-Moulineaux.
