= Sétif (département) =

Former French department in Algeria (1957–1962)

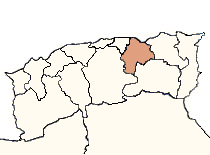
Map of the department of Sétifin 1962

Sétif is a former French département in Algeria which existed between 1957 and 1974.

== History ==
Considered as a French province, Algeria was departmentalised on 9 December 1848, and thereby was administratively structured in the same way as metropolitan France. Three civil zones (départements) replaced the three beyliks into which the Ottoman former rulers had divided the territory. The easternmost of the three original Algerian departments was called Constantine. For over a century the town of Sétif, was a sub-prefecture in the département of Constantine: this changed in 1957.

On 20 May 1957 the Sétif sub-prefecture was split off and became a separate département, directly to the west of the now diminished département of Constantine. This administrative reorganisation was undertaken in response to the rapid population increase experienced across the territory, especially during the preceding decade.

The new largely mountainous département of Sétif covered an area of 17,405 km^{2}: a population of 1,001,461 was recorded. The department comprised eight sub-prefectures: these were Akbou, Bordj Bou Arréridj, Bougie, Kherrata, Lafayette, M'Sila, Sidi-Aïch and Saint Arnaud.

The 1957 departmental reorganisation was marked by a change in the "suffix" number appearing on automobile license plates and in other places that used the same code. Until 1957, as part of the département of Constantine, Sétif was identified by the department number "93": after 1957 the département of Sétif became department number "9J". (In 1968, under a law enacted in 1964, the number "93" would be reallocated to a new département comprising the northern suburbs of Paris.)

After independence the department continued to exist until 1974 when it was split into Béjaïa Province, Jijel Province, M'Sila Province and Sétif Province.

== See also ==
- Départements français d'Algérie
