= Oran (department) =

French department in Algeria from 1848 to 1962

Department of Oran Département d'Oran عمّالة وهران
- Department of France
- Coat of arms

- Administrative map of French Algeria from 1934 to 1955, showing the Oran department in pink
- Capital: Oran
- History
  - Established: 9 December 1848
  - Disestablished: 1974
- Subdivisions
  - Type: Subprefecture
  - Units: Mascara; Mostaganem; Sidi Bel Abbès; Tiaret; Tlemcen
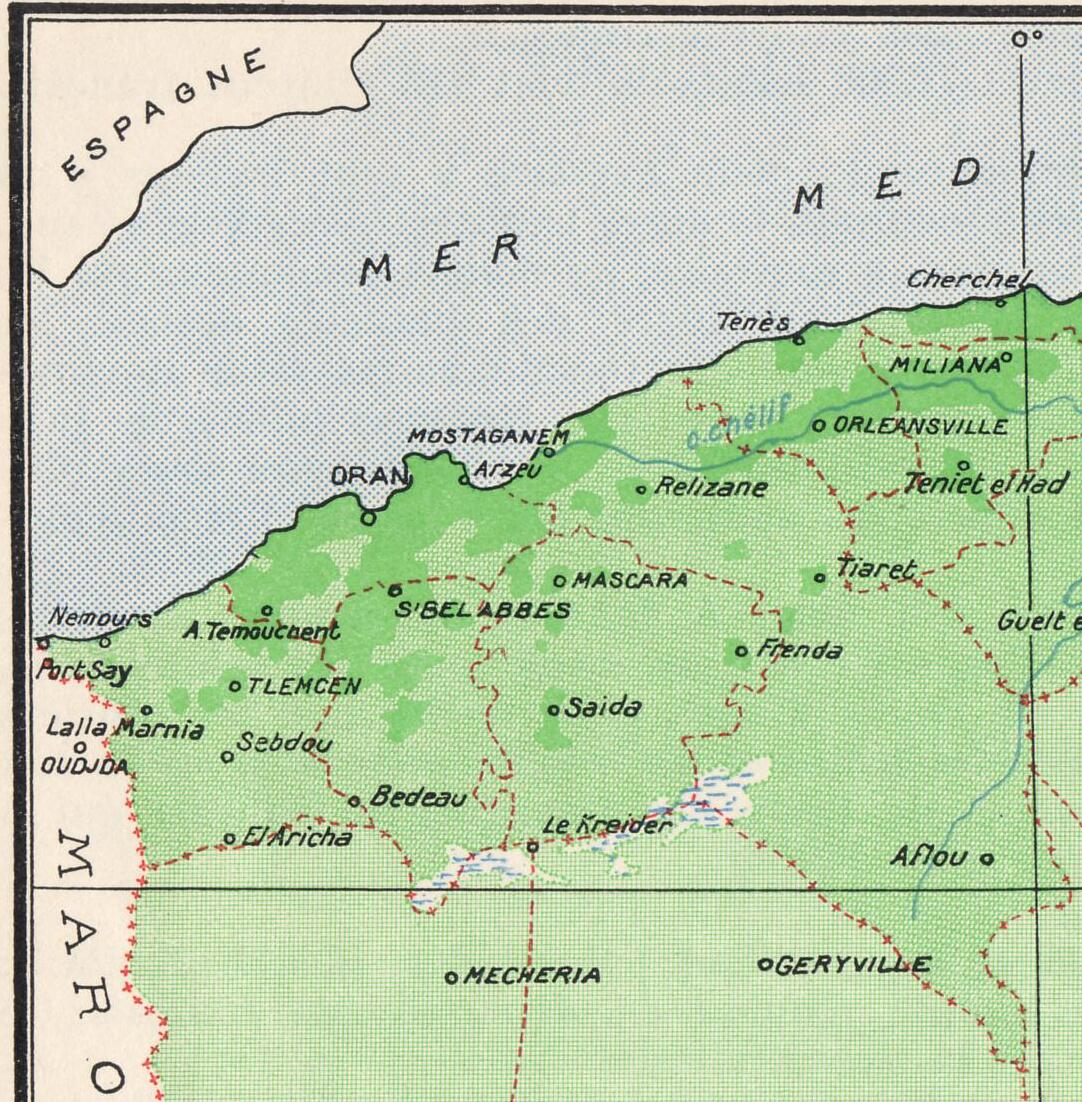
- Map showing the department's subprefectures, 1934
Preceded by
Western Beylik
Succeeded by
Mascara Province
Oran Province
Saïda Province
Sidi Bel Abbès Province
Tlemcen Province
- Today part of: Algeria

The Department of Oran (French: département d'Oran, [depaʁtəmɑ̃ dorɑ̃], Arabic: عمّالة وهران) was a French département in Algeria existing from 1848 until 1962.

Originally a French province, it was departmentalised on 9 December 1848. Its principal town, Oran, was made the prefecture of the département. There were three French départements in Algeria: Oran in the west, Alger in the center, and Constantine in the east. Oran covered 67,262 km^{2}, encompassing five sub-prefectures of Mascara, Mostaganem, Sidi Bel Abbès, Tiaret and Tlemcen.

== History ==
=== The origin of the administrative divisions ===
Considered as a French province, Algeria was departmentalised on 9 December 1848, thereby operating according to the same administrative structure as metropolitan France. Three civil zones (départements) replaced the three beyliks into which the Ottoman former rulers had divided the territory. The principal town of the western département, also called Oran, became the prefecture of the eponymous département. The two other Algerian departments were Algiers in the center and Constantine in the east.

=== Creation, structure and reorganisation of the department ===
The department of Oran was created on 9 December 1848, at the same time as the departments of Algiers and Constantine. Like them, it bears the name of its capital.

In 1864, the department comprised four districts: Oran, Mascara, Mostaganem and Tlemcen. This number subsequently increased to six with the creation of the districts of Sidi Bel Abbès in 1875 and Tiaret in 1939.

The decree of 28 August 1955, created three new districts: Aïn Temouchent, Maghnia and Relizane.

In 1956, the department was divided into three new departments: Oran Province, Mostaganem Province, and Tiaret Province. The new department of Oran then comprised five districts: Oran, Aïn Temouchent, Perrégaux, Sidi Bel Abbès and Telagh.

In 1958, a fourth department was created from the former department of Oran, that of Saïda Province, made up of several districts taken from the new departments, including that of Telagh. However, this district returned to the department of Oran on 7 November 1959.

After independence the department continued to exist until 1974 when it was split into Mascara Province, Oran Province, Saïda Province, Sidi Bel Abbès Province and Tlemcen Province.

== See also ==
- Oranie
