= Chellalat El Adhaoura District =

Coordinates: 35°56′24″N 3°24′36″E

Challalat El Adhaoura District
- District
- Interactive map of Challalat El Adhaoura District
- Country: Algeria
- Province: Médéa Province
- Time zone: UTC+1 (CET)

Challalat El Adhaoura District is a district of Médéa Province, Algeria.

The district is further divided into 4 municipalities:

- Challalat El Adhaoura
- Cheniguel
- Tafraout
- Aïn Ou Ksir
