= Aziz District =

Coordinates: 35.8167°N 2.4500°E

- District
- Country: Algeria
- Province: Médéa Province
- Time zone: UTC+1 (CET)

Aziz District is a district of Médéa Province, Algeria.

The district is further divided into 3 municipalities:

- Aziz
- Oum El Djalil
- Derrag
