= Aïn Boucif District =

Coordinates: 35.89123°N 3.1585°E

- District
- Interactive map of Aïn Boucif District
- Country: Algeria
- Province: Médéa Province
- Time zone: UTC+1 (CET)

Aïn Boucif District is a district of Médéa Province, Algeria.

The district is further divided into 5 municipalities:

- Aïn Boucif
- Kef Lakhdar
- Ouled Maaref
- Sidi Damed
- El Ouinet
