= Guelb El Kébir District =

- District
- Country: Algeria
- Province: Médéa Province
- Time zone: UTC+1 (CET)

Guelb El Kébir District is a district of Médéa Province, Algeria.

The district is further divided into 3 municipalities:

- El Guelbelkebir
- Sedraia
- Bir Ben Laabed
