= Chahbounia District =

Coordinates: 35°32′41″N 2°36′12″E

- District
- Country: Algeria
- Province: Médéa Province
- Time zone: UTC+1 (CET)

Chahbounia District is a district of Médéa Province, Algeria.

The district is further divided into 3 municipalities:

- Chahbounia
- Boughezoul
- Bou Aiche
