= Berrouaghia District =

Coordinates: 36°39′36″N 2°55′12″E

- District
- Country: Algeria
- Province: Médéa Province
- Time zone: UTC+1 (CET)

The Berrouaghia District is one of the districts of the province of Médéa, Algeria. Its capital is Berrouaghia, located about 15 km south of Medea and 90 km southwest of the capital. It has a strategic location in the hills of Algiers, as it belongs to the Tell Atlas Mountains. It is located very close to the provinces of Blida (45 km) (30 km from the province border), Aïn Defla (80 km) (30 km from the province border), Tipaza (70 km) (50 km from the province border), and Algiers (65 km from the province border). It is also not far from Bouira (100 km) (70 km from the province border). It includes the municipalities of:

- Berrouaghia
- Ouled Deide
- Rebaia
