= Sidi Naâmane District =

Coordinates: 36.215056°N 3.123937°E

- District
- Country: Algeria
- Province: Médéa Province
- Time zone: UTC+1 (CET)

Sidi Naâmane District is a district of Médéa Province, Algeria.

The district is further divided into 3 municipalities:

- Sidi Naamane
- Khams Djouamaa
- Bouchrahil
