= Tablat District =

Coordinates: 36°24′46″N 3°18′36″E

- District
- Interactive map of Tablat District
- Country: Algeria
- Province: Médéa Province
- Time zone: UTC+1 (CET)

Tablat District is a district of Médéa Province, Algeria.

The district is further divided into four municipalities:

- Tablat
- Deux Bassins
- Aissaouia
- Mezerana
