= Si Mahdjoub District =

Coordinates: 36.160382°N 2.722206°E

- District
- Country: Algeria
- Province: Médéa Province
- Time zone: UTC+1 (CET)

Si Mahdjoub District is a district of Médéa Province, Algeria.

The district is further divided into 3 municipalities:

- Sidi Mahdjoub
- Ouled Bouachra
- Bouaichoune
