= Ouzera District =

Coordinates: 36°15′N 2°51′E

- District
- Country: Algeria
- Province: Médéa Province
- Time zone: UTC+1 (CET)

Ouzera District is a district of Médéa Province, Algeria.

The district is further divided into 4 municipalities:

- Ouzera
- Tizi Mahdi
- El Hamdania
- Benchicao
