= El Omaria District =

Coordinates: 36°16′N 3°02′E

- District
- Country: Algeria
- Province: Médéa Province
- Time zone: UTC+1 (CET)

El Omaria District is a district of Médéa Province, Algeria.

The district is further divided into 3 municipalities:

- El Omaria
- Baata
- Ouled Brahim
