= Seghouane District =

Coordinates: 36°00′N 2°54′E

- District
- Country: Algeria
- Province: Médéa Province
- Time zone: UTC+1 (CET)

Seghouane District is a district of Médéa Province, Algeria.

The district is further divided into 4 municipalities:

- Seghouane
- Zoubiria
- Medjebar
- Tlatet Eddouair
