= Ouled Antar District =

Coordinates: 35.94725°N 2.60231°E

Ouled Antar District دائرة أولاد عنتر
- District
- Country: Algeria
- Province: Médéa Province
- Time zone: UTC+1 (CET)

Ouled Antar District is a district of Médéa Province, Algeria.

The district is further divided into 3 municipalities:

- Ouled Antar
- Boghar
- Ouled Hellal
