= Béni Slimane District =

- District

- Location within Algeria
- Coordinates: 36.22703°N 3.30596°E
- Country: Algeria
- Province: Médéa Province
- Time zone: UTC+1 (CET)

Béni Slimane District is a district of Médéa Province, Algeria.

The district is further divided into 3 municipalities:

- Beni Slimane
- Sidi Errabia
- Bouskene
