= Souaghi District =

Coordinates: 36.1167°N 3.2333°E

- District
- Interactive map of Souaghi District
- Country: Algeria
- Province: Médéa Province
- Time zone: UTC+1 (CET)

Souaghi District is a district of Médéa Province, Algeria.

The district is further divided into 4 municipalities:

- Souagui
- Djouab
- Sidi Zahar
- Sidi Ziane

hi
