= Médéa District =

Coordinates: 36.267494°N 2.750101°E

- District
- Country: Algeria
- Province: Médéa Province
- Time zone: UTC+1 (CET)

Médéa District is a district of Médéa Province, Algeria. In 2008 the population was 152,607.

The district is further divided into 3 municipalities:

- Médéa
- Draa Essamar
- Tamesguida

== Notable people ==
- Mohamed Belhocine (born 1951), Algerian medical scientist, professor of internal medicine and epidemiology.
