= El Azizia (disambiguation) =

El Azizia commonly refers to ʽAziziya, a town in Jafara, Libya

El Azizia may also refer to:

- El Azizia District, district in Médéa, Algeria
- El Azizia, Médéa, municipality in Médéa, Algeria
