= El Azizia District =

Coordinates: 36.28656°N 3.49412°E

- District
- Interactive map of El Azizia District
- Country: Algeria
- Province: Médéa Province
- Time zone: UTC+1 (CET)

El Azizia (or Al Azizia) District is a district of Médéa Province, Algeria.

The district is further divided into 3 municipalities:

- El Azizia
- Maghraoua
- Mihoub
