= Ksar El Boukhari District =

Coordinates: 35.8856°N 2.7508°E

Ksar El Boukhari District دائرة قصر البخاري
- District
- Country: Algeria
- Province: Médéa Province
- Time zone: UTC+1 (CET)

Ksar El Boukhari District is a district of Médéa Province, Algeria.

The district is further divided into 3 municipalities:

- Ksar Boukhari
- Mefatha
- Saneg
