= Médéa Province =

Province of Algeria

Médéa Province ولاية المدية
- Province
- Map of Algeria highlighting Médéa
- Coordinates: 36°16′N 2°45′E
- Country: Algeria
- Capital: Médéa

Government
  - Wāli: Djillali Doumi

Area
  - Total: 8,866 km^{2} (3,423 sq mi)

Population (2008)
  - Total: 830,943
  - Density: 93.72/km^{2} (242.7/sq mi)
- Time zone: UTC+01 (CET)
- Area Code: +213 (0) 25
- ISO 3166 code: DZ-26
- Districts: 19
- Municipalities: 64

Médéa (Arabic: ولاية المدية) is a province (wilaya) of Algeria, with a population of 1 062 134 inhabitants in 2019and Médéa as its capital.

== Administrative divisions ==
The province is divided into 19 districts (daïras), which are further divided into 64 communes or municipalities.

=== Districts ===
1. Aïn Boucif
2. Aziz
3. Béni Slimane
4. Berrouaghia
5. Chahbounia
6. Chellalat El Adhaoura
7. El Azizia
8. El Omaria
9. Guelb El Kébir
10. Ksar El Boukhari
11. Médéa
12. Ouamri
13. Ouled Antar
14. Ouzera
15. Seghouane
16. Si Mahdjoub
17. Sidi Naâmane
18. Souaghi
19. Tablat

=== Communes ===
1. Aïn Boucif
2. Aïn Ou Ksir
3. Aissaouia
4. Aziz
5. Baata
6. Benchicao
7. Beni Slimane
8. Berrouaghia
9. Bir Ben Laabed
10. Boghar
11. Bou Aiche
12. Bouaichoune
13. Bouchrahil
14. Boughezoui
15. Bouskene
16. Chahbounia
17. Chellalat El Adhaoura
18. Cheniguel
19. Damiat
20. Derrag
21. Deux Bassins
22. Djouab
23. Draa Essamar
24. El Azizia
25. El Guelbelkebir
26. El Hamdania
27. El Omaria
28. El Ouinet
29. Hannacha
30. Kef Lakhdar
31. Khams Djouamaa
32. Ksar Boukhari
33. Meghraoua
34. Médéa
35. Medjebar
36. Meftaha
37. Mezerana
38. Mihoub
39. Ouamri
40. Oued Harbil
41. Ouled Bouachra
42. Ouled Antar
43. Ouled Brahim
44. Ouled Deide
45. Ouled Hellal
46. Ouled Maaref
47. Oum El Djalil
48. Ouzera
49. Rebaia
50. Saneg
51. Sedraia
52. Seghouane
53. Sidi Mahdjoub
54. Sidi Damed
55. Sidi Errabia
56. Sidi Naamane
57. Sidi Zahar
58. Sidi Ziane
59. Souagui
60. Tablat
61. Tafraout
62. Tamesguida
63. Tizi Mahdi
64. Tlatet Eddouair
65. Zoubiria

== Notable people ==
- Mohamed Belhocine (born 1951), Algerian medical scientist, professor of internal medicine and epidemiology.
