= Damiat, Algeria =

- Commune and town
- Country: Algeria
- Province: Médéa Province

Population (1998)
  - Total: 3,310
- Time zone: UTC+1 (CET)

Damiat, Algeria is a town and commune in Médéa Province, Algeria. According to the 1998 census, it has a population of 3,310.
