= Hannacha =

Hannacha حناشة
- Commune and town
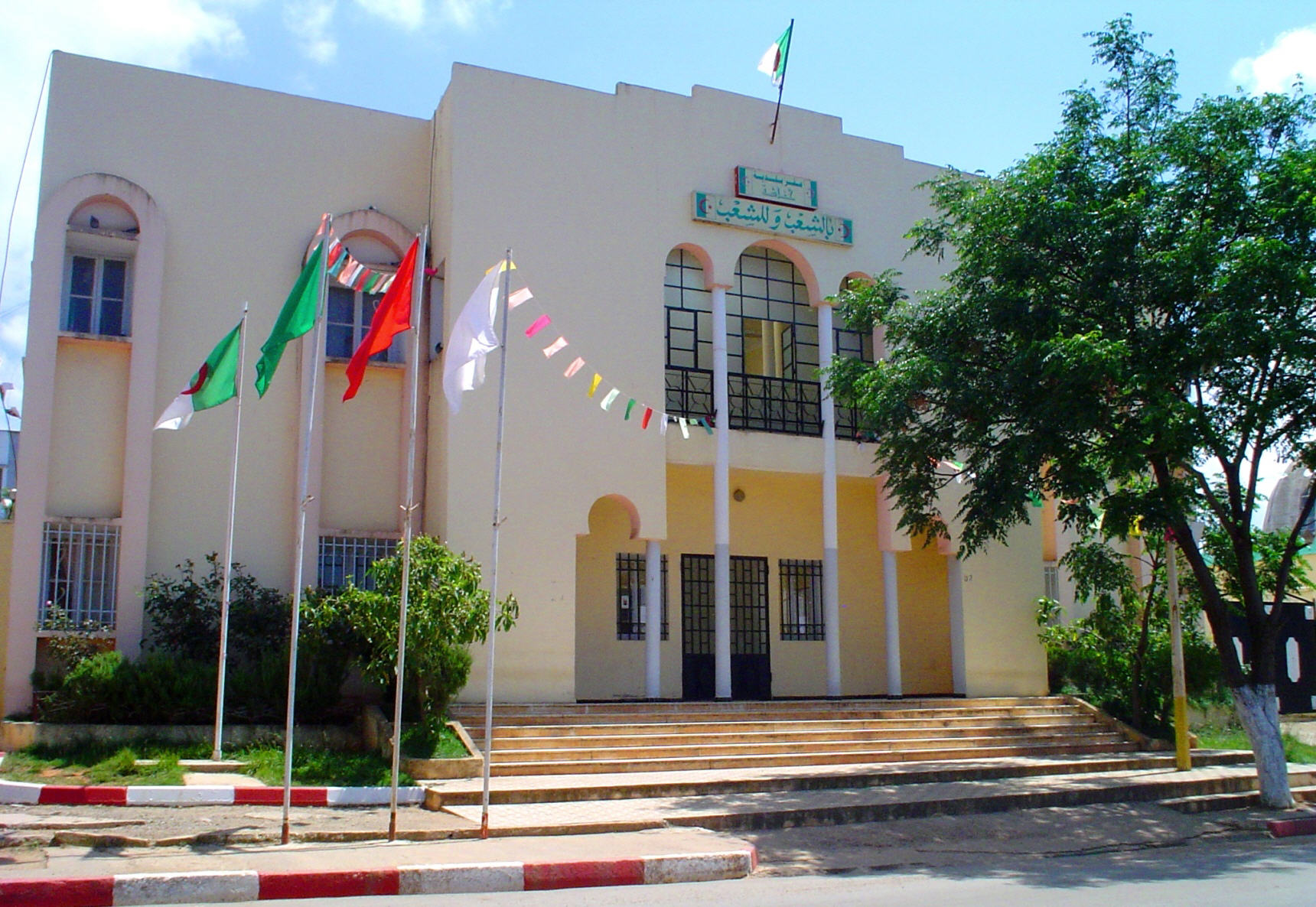

- Location within Algeria
- Coordinates: 36°11′0″N 2°34′0″E
- Country: Algeria
- Province: Médéa Province

Area
  - Total: 21 sq mi (54 km^{2})

Population (2008)
  - Total: 4,882
- Time zone: UTC+1 (CET)
- CP: 26180

Hannacha is a town and commune in Médéa Province, Algeria. According to the 1998 census, it has a population of 5,784.
