= Tizi Mahdi =

- Commune and town
- Location within Algeria
- Coordinates: 36°12′10″N 2°46′33″E
- Country: Algeria
- Province: Médéa Province
- District: Ouzera District

Population (2008)
  - Total: 2,655
- Time zone: UTC+1 (CET)

Tizi Mahdi is a town and commune in Médéa Province, Algeria.
