= Derrag =

Town and commune in Médéa Province, Algeria

- Commune and town
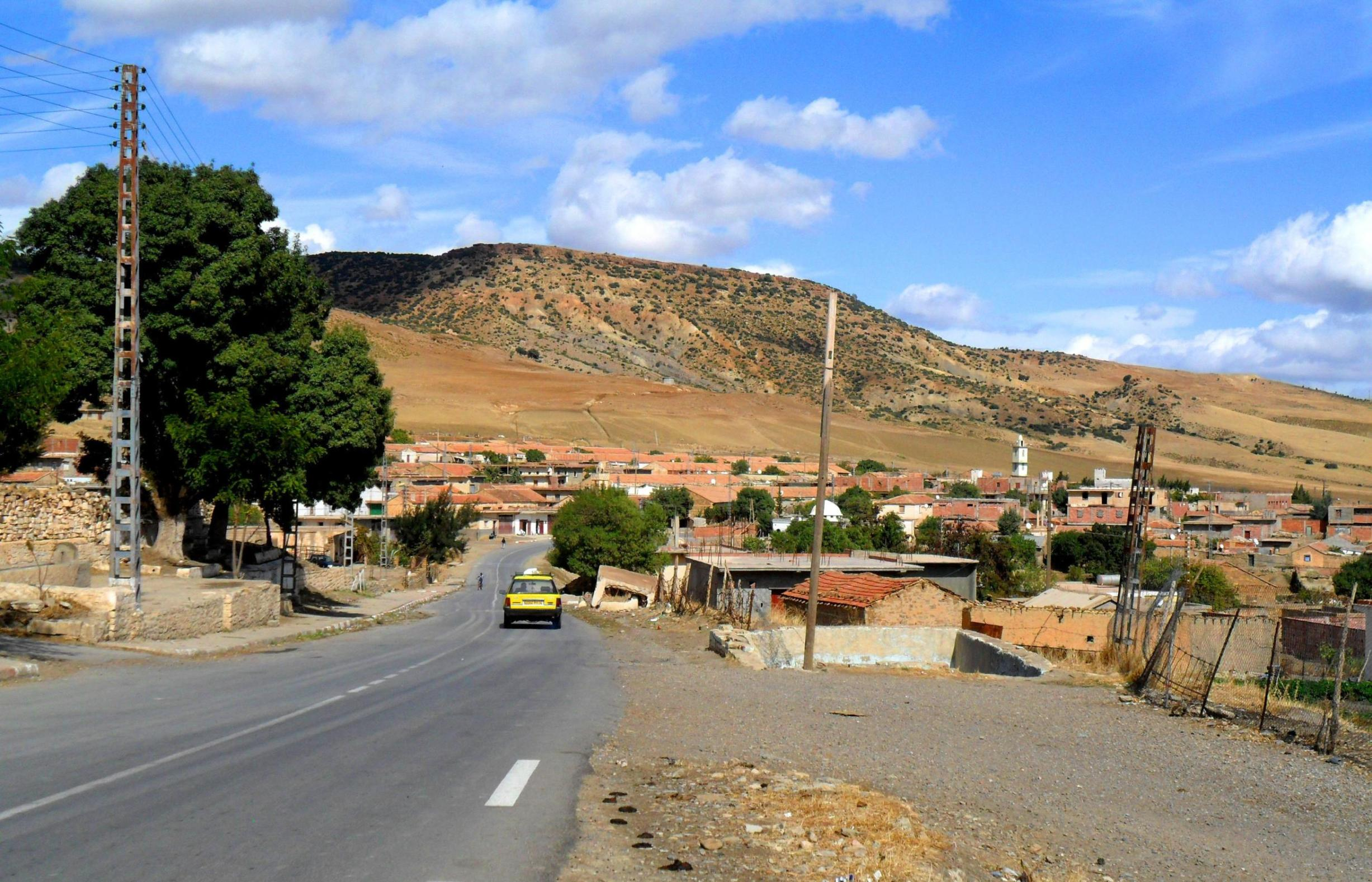
- Kherbat Siouf in Derrag

- Location within Algeria
- Coordinates: 35°54′31″N 2°23′16″E
- Country: Algeria
- Province: Médéa Province
- Elevation: 3,770 ft (1,150 m)

Population (1998)
  - Total: 7,695
- Time zone: UTC+1 (CET)

Derrag is a town and commune in Médéa Province, Algeria.

== Demographics ==
According to the 1998 census, it has a population of 7,695.

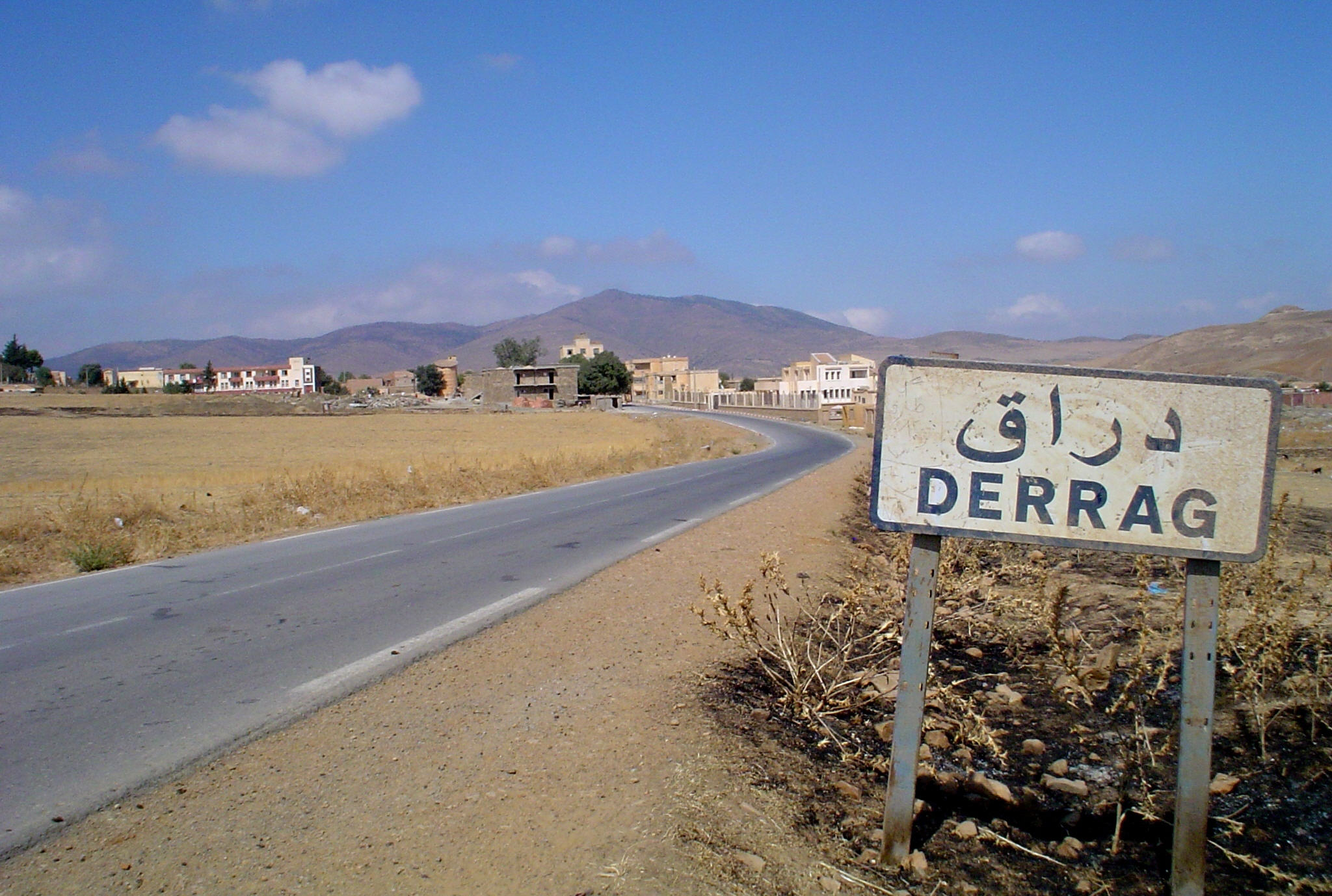

== Geography ==
Derrag is located on the southern side of the Tellian Atlas, west of the Oursenis. It is located within the Bled Derrag area in the corner between the forests of Chaoun and Boumedienne, separated from the high plateau by the Taguensa and Djebel Azzeba. The area is bordered by mountains or two sides and the steppe on the third.

Boumediene is located to the north of Derrag (1,648 m), Chaoun to the west (1.804 m) and Jebel Azzeba (1,386 m) and Tagensa (1,710 m) to the north east.

Located in the Ouarsenis mountain region, much of the land is sloped and hence unfavourable to mechanised farming and susceptible to erosion.

Water sources in the area are limited (Aîn Endis, the largest river, has a flow of 6 litres per second at low water). Drinking water is available in some areas, but tends to be calcareous. Other areas lack drinking water resources.

== History ==
The region of Bled Derrag was attached to the mixed commune of Theniet El Had at the beginning of colonisation. It was created from the colonial village of Letourneux in 1891. This area then passed under the authority of the mixed-commune of Boghari until 1956, when it became a fully functioning commune separated from Siouf. In 1963, it was integrated into the newly created municipality of Aziz. The municipality was later revived under the name Derrag in 1984.
