= Sidi Damed =

Coordinates: 35°52′10″N 3°15′16″E

- Commune and town
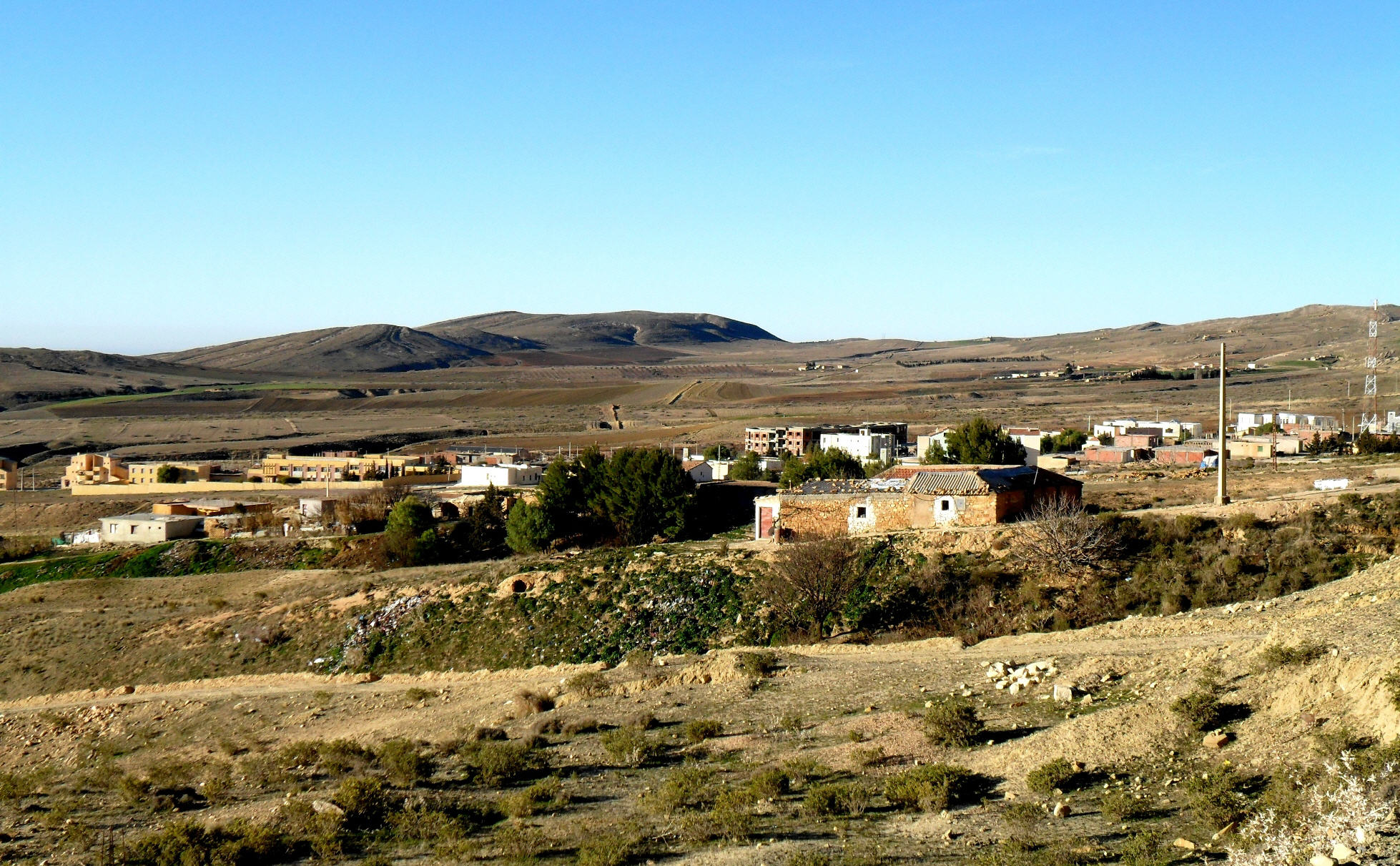
- Interactive map of Sidi Damed
- Country: Algeria
- Province: Médéa Province

Population (1998)
  - Total: 3,784
- Time zone: UTC+1 (CET)

Sidi Damed is a town and commune in Médéa Province, Algeria. According to the 1998 census, it has a population of 3,784.
