= Benchicao =

Coordinates: 36°11′59″N 2°50′55″E

- Commune and town
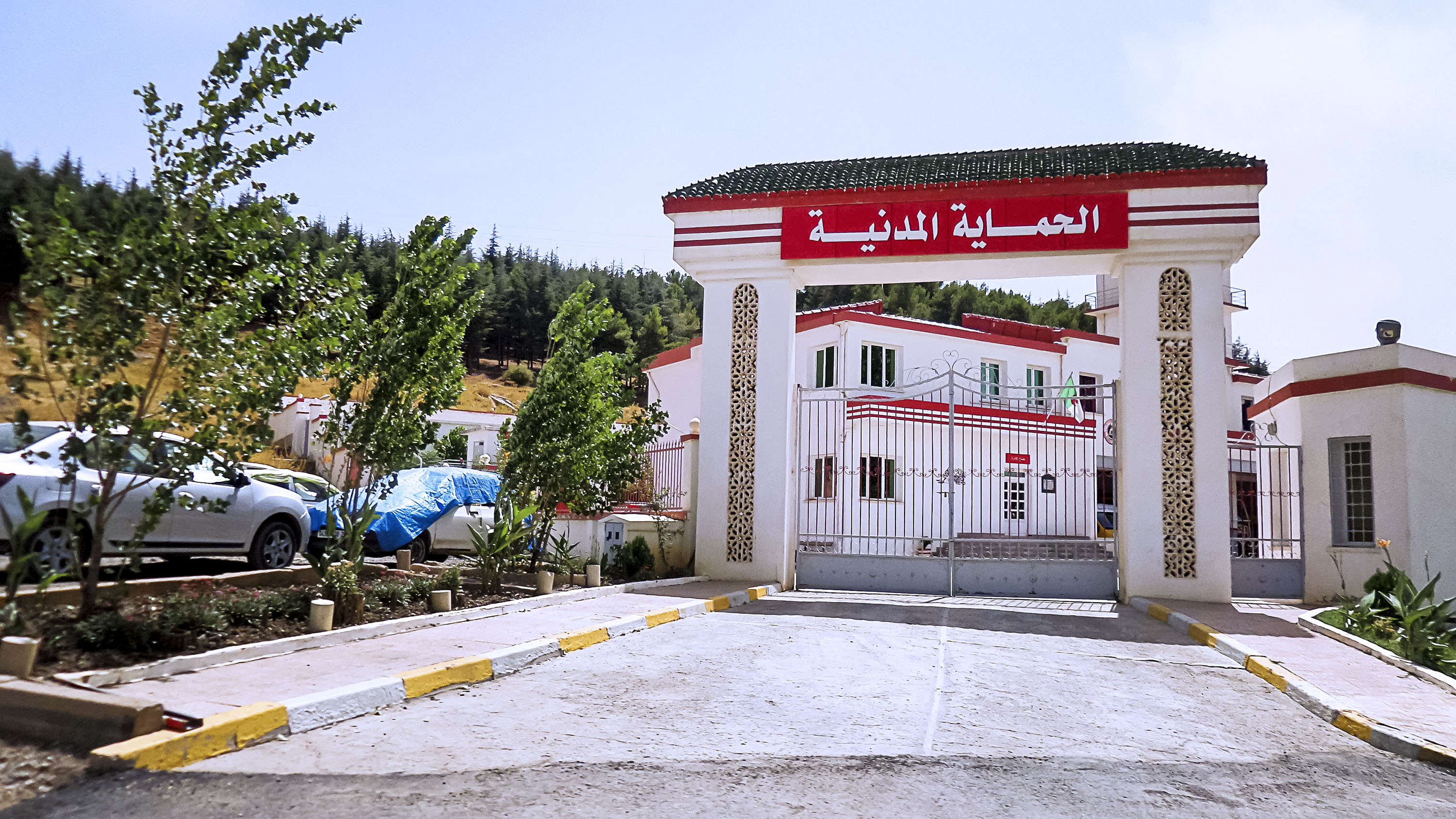
- Interactive map of Benchicao
- Country: Algeria
- Province: Médéa Province

Population (1998)
  - Total: 8,946
- Time zone: UTC+1 (CET)

Benchicao is a town and commune in Médéa Province, Algeria. According to the 1998 census, it has a population of 8,946.
