= Bouchrahil =

- Commune and town
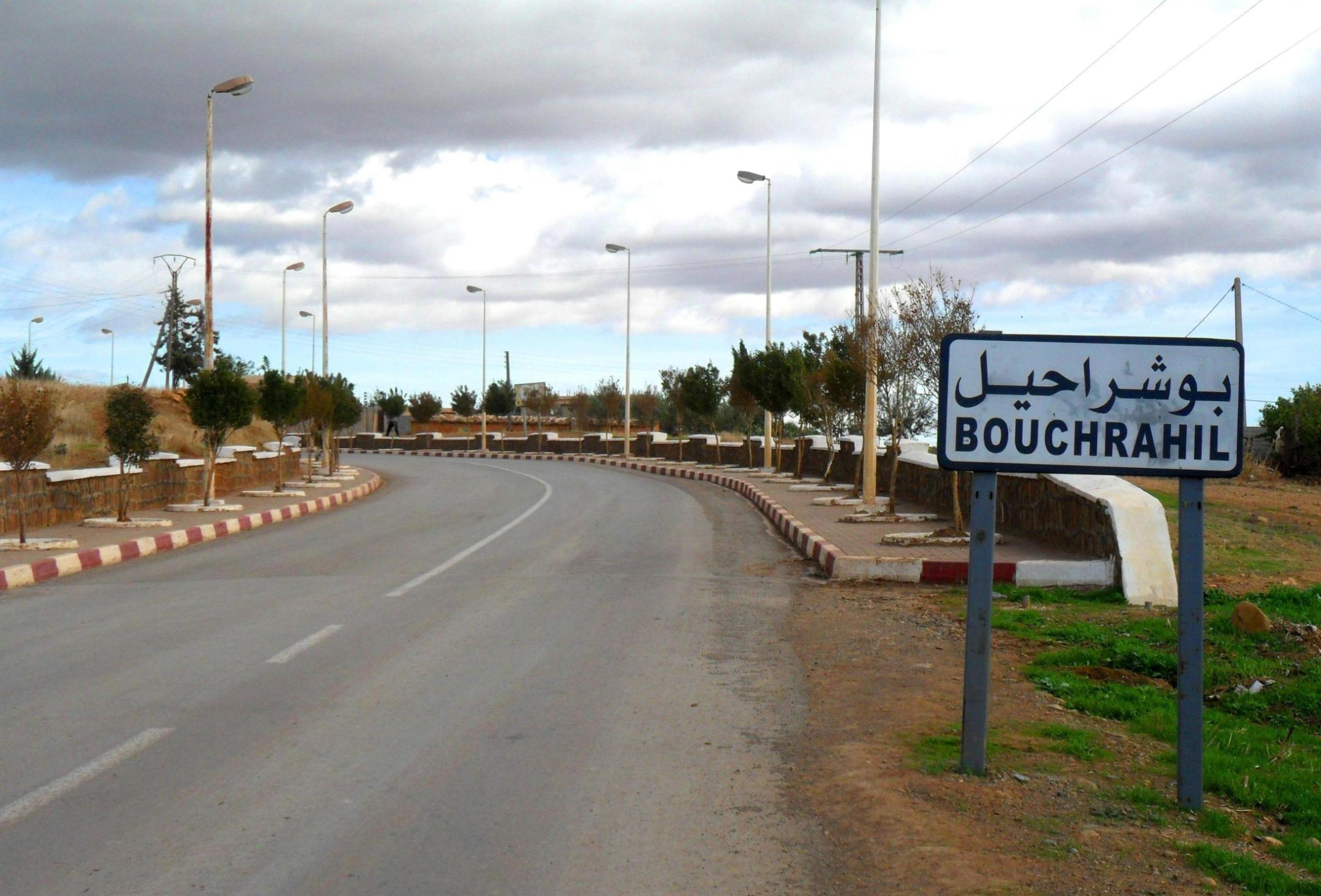

- Location within Algeria
- Coordinates: 36°15′10″N 3°9′31″E
- Country: Algeria
- Province: Médéa Province

Population (1998)
  - Total: 18,308
- Time zone: UTC+1 (CET)

Bouchrahil is a town and commune in Médéa Province, Algeria. According to the 1998 census, it has a population of 18,308.
