= Sidi Errabia =

Coordinates: 36°16′32″N 3°18′24″E

- Commune and town
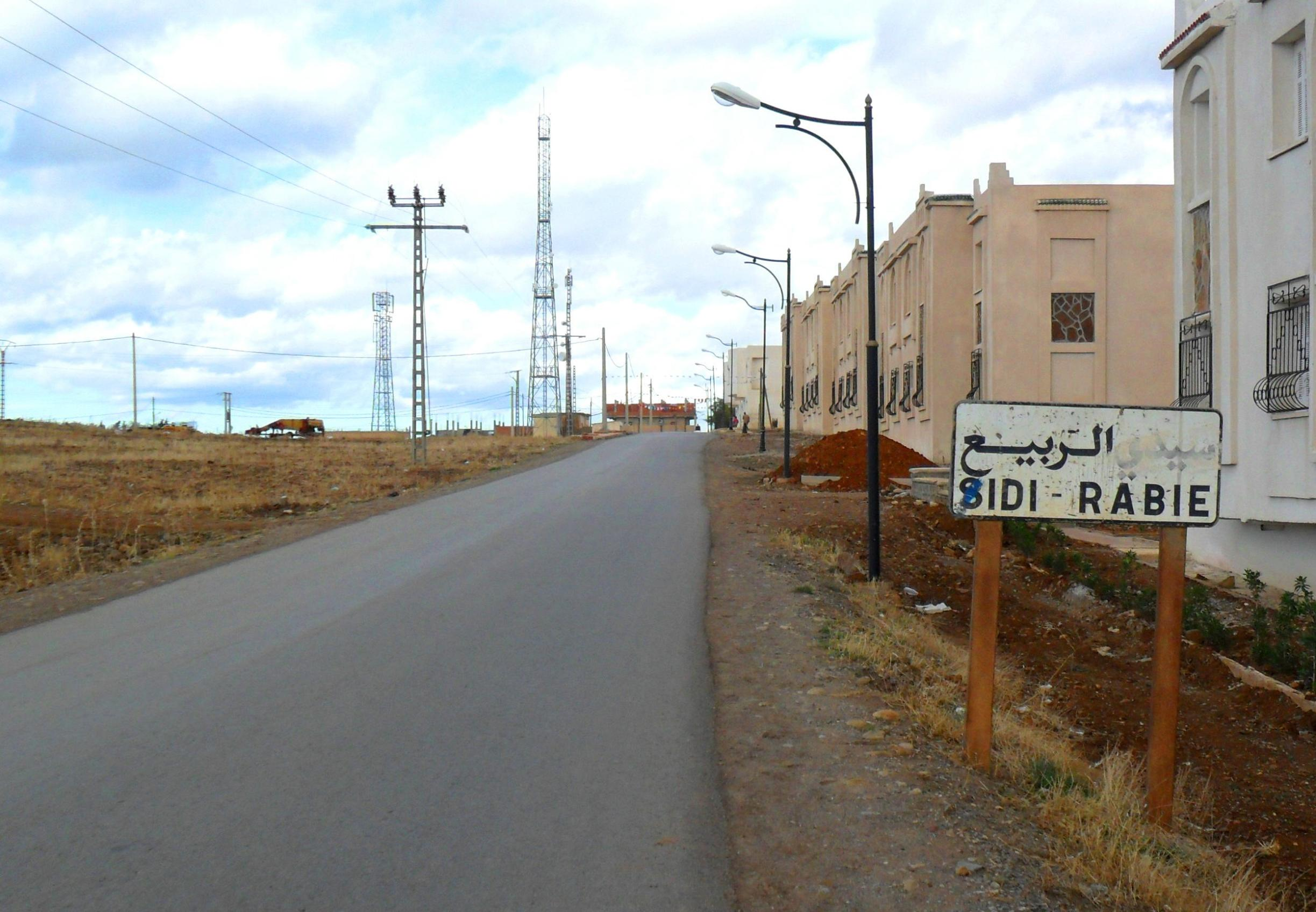
- Interactive map of Sidi Errabia
- Country: Algeria
- Province: Médéa Province
- Time zone: UTC+1 (CET)

Sidi Errabia is a town and commune in Médéa Province, Algeria.
