= Seghouane =

Coordinates: 36°00′N 2°54′E

- Commune and town
- Interactive map of Seghouane
- Country: Algeria
- Province: Médéa Province

Population (1998)
  - Total: 7,599
- Time zone: UTC+1 (CET)

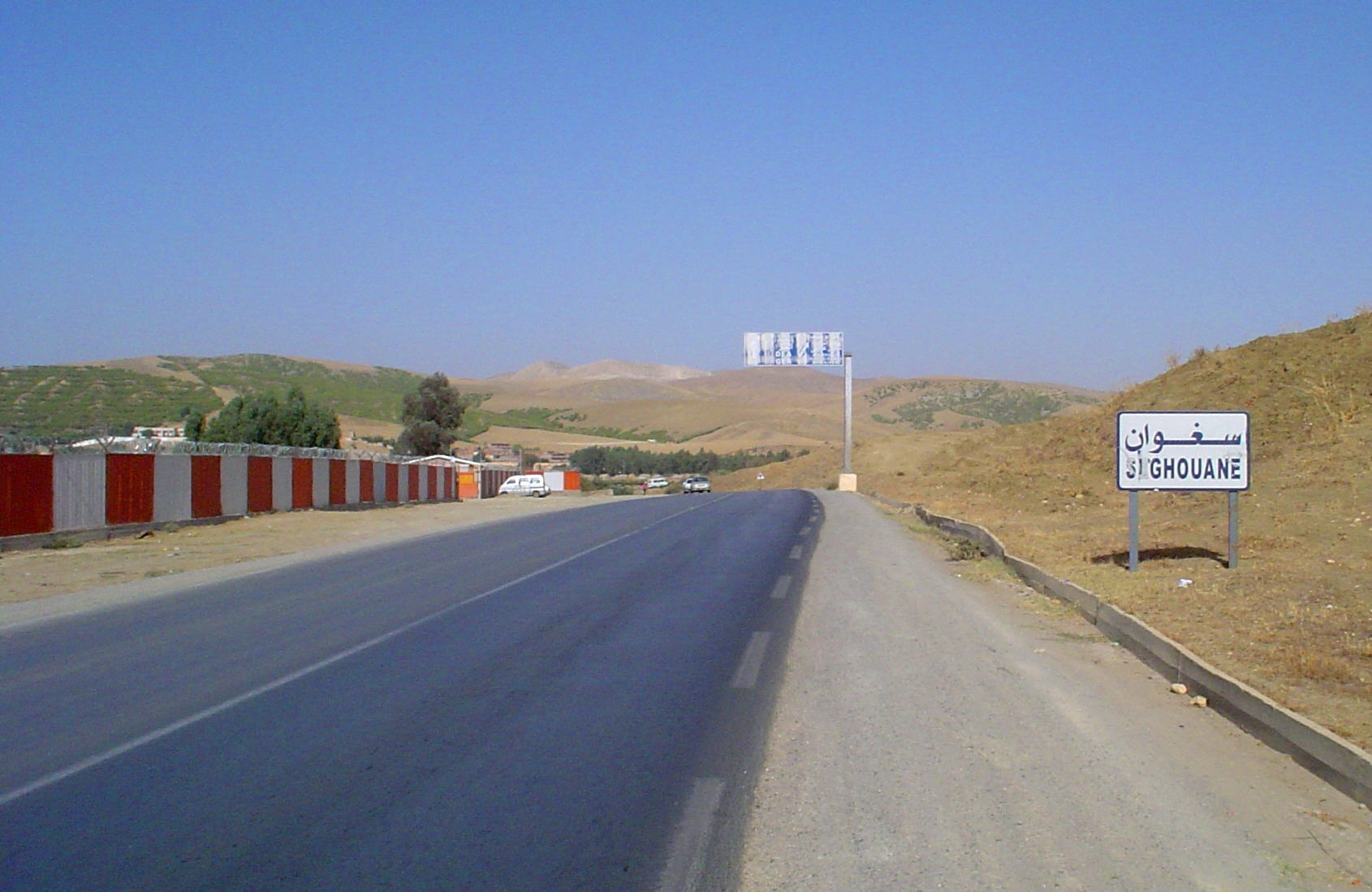
Road leading to Seghouane

Seghouane is a town and commune in Médéa Province, Algeria. According to the 1998 census, it has a population of 7,599.
