= El Guelbelkebir =

Coordinates: 36°15′23″N 3°24′58″E

- Commune and town
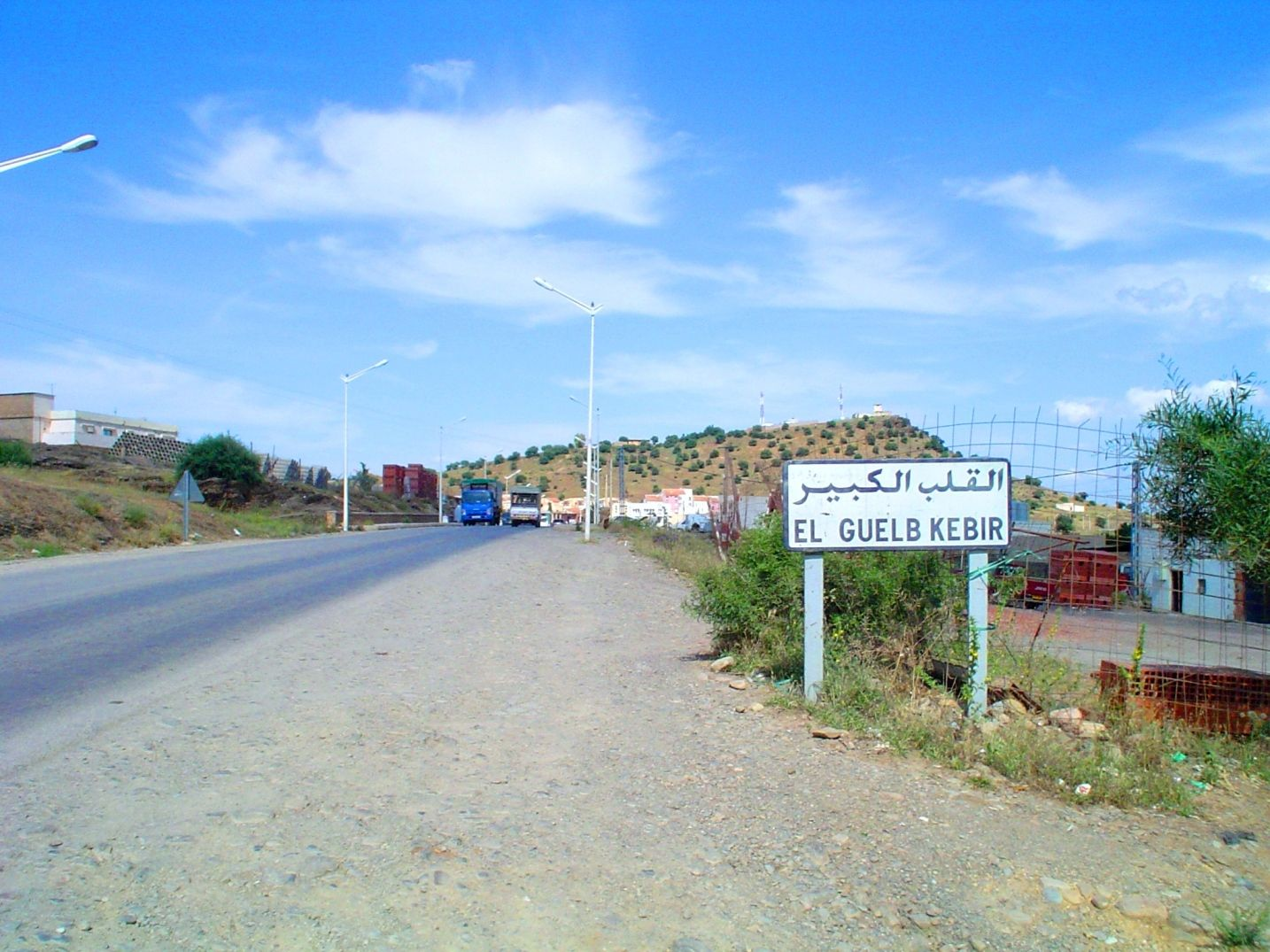
- Interactive map of El Guelbelkebir
- Country: Algeria
- Province: Médéa Province

Population (1998)
  - Total: 14,663
- Time zone: UTC+1 (CET)

El Guelbelkebir is a town and commune in Médéa Province, Algeria. According to the 1998 census, it has a population of 14,663.
