= Mezerana =

Mezerana مزغنة
- Commune and town
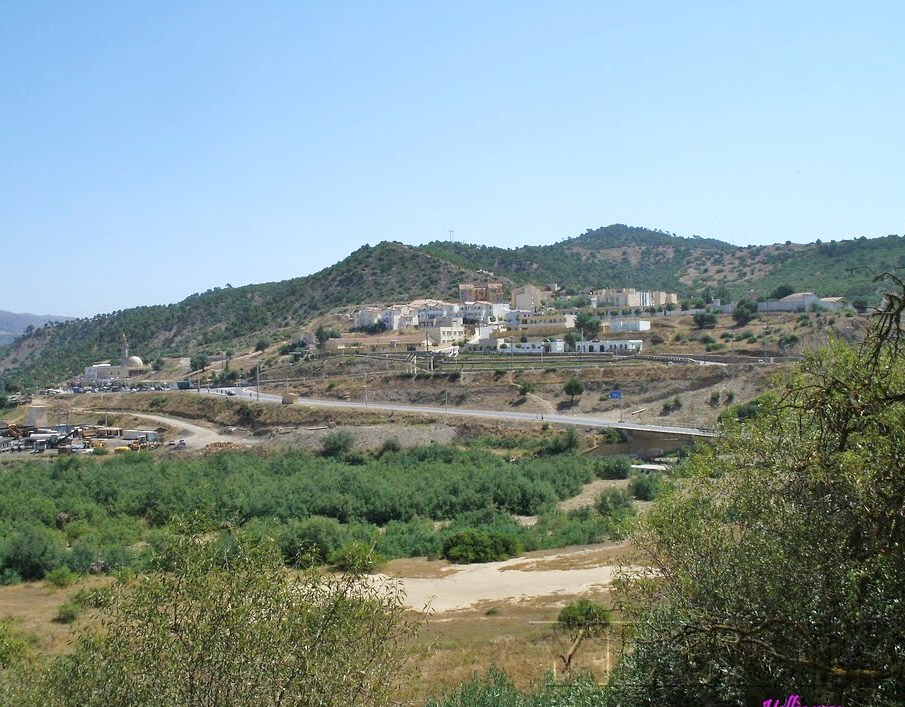

- Location within Algeria
- Coordinates: 36.3609993°N 3.3580828°E
- Country: Algeria
- Province: Médéa Province

Population (1998)
  - Total: 8,361
- Time zone: UTC+1 (CET)

Mezerana is a town and commune in Médéa Province, Algeria. According to the 2013 census, it has a population of 6,202. The town has a Mediterranean climate and the most commonly used language is Arabic.
