= Bouaichoune =

- Commune and town
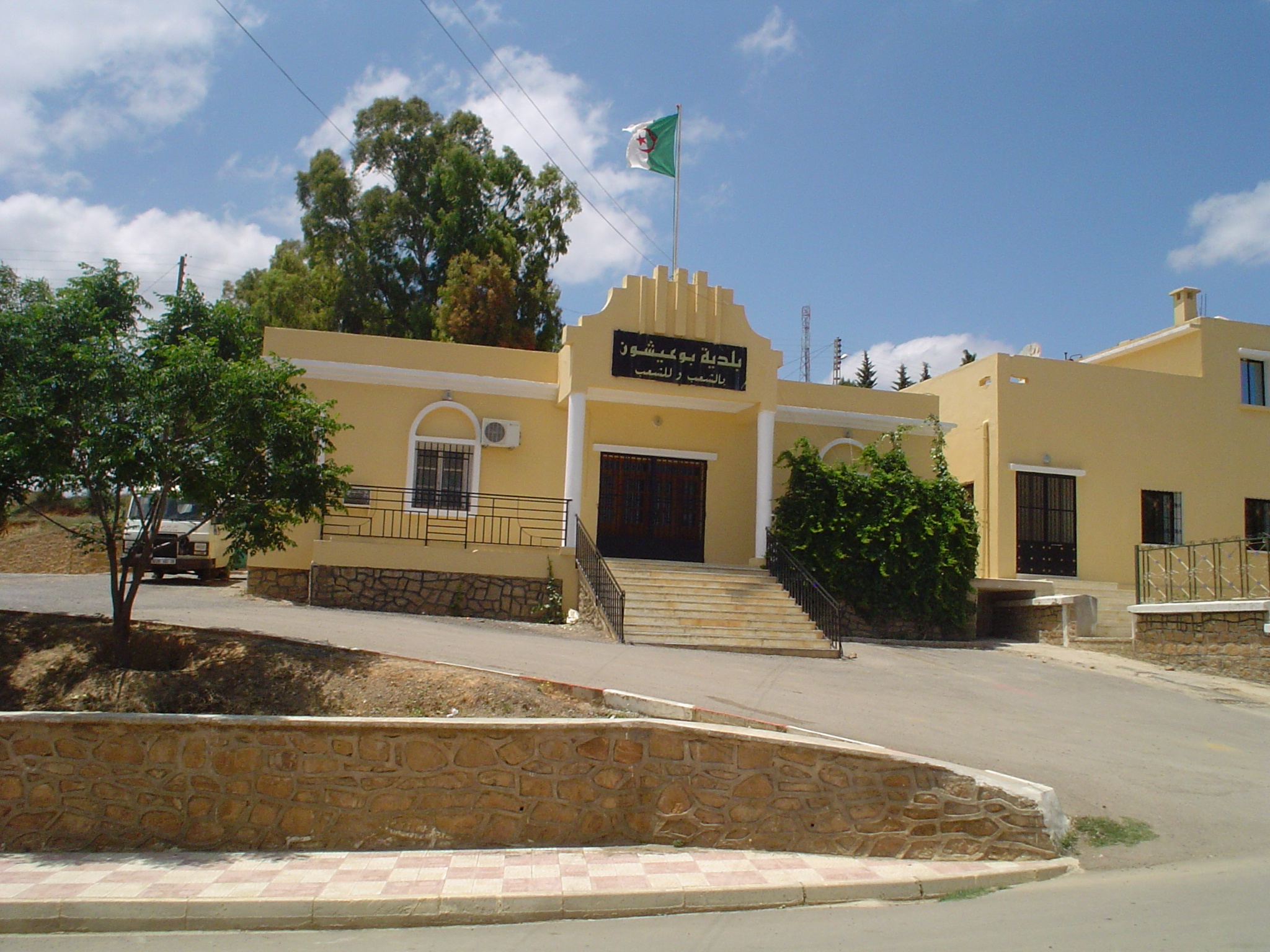

- Location within Algeria
- Coordinates: 36°9′45″N 2°40′33″E
- Country: Algeria
- Province: Médéa Province

Population (1998)
  - Total: 4,036
- Time zone: UTC+1 (CET)

Bouaichoune is a town and commune in Médéa Province, Algeria. According to the 1998 census, it has a population of 4,036.
