= Sidi Zahar =

Coordinates: 36°04′N 3°20′E

- Commune and town
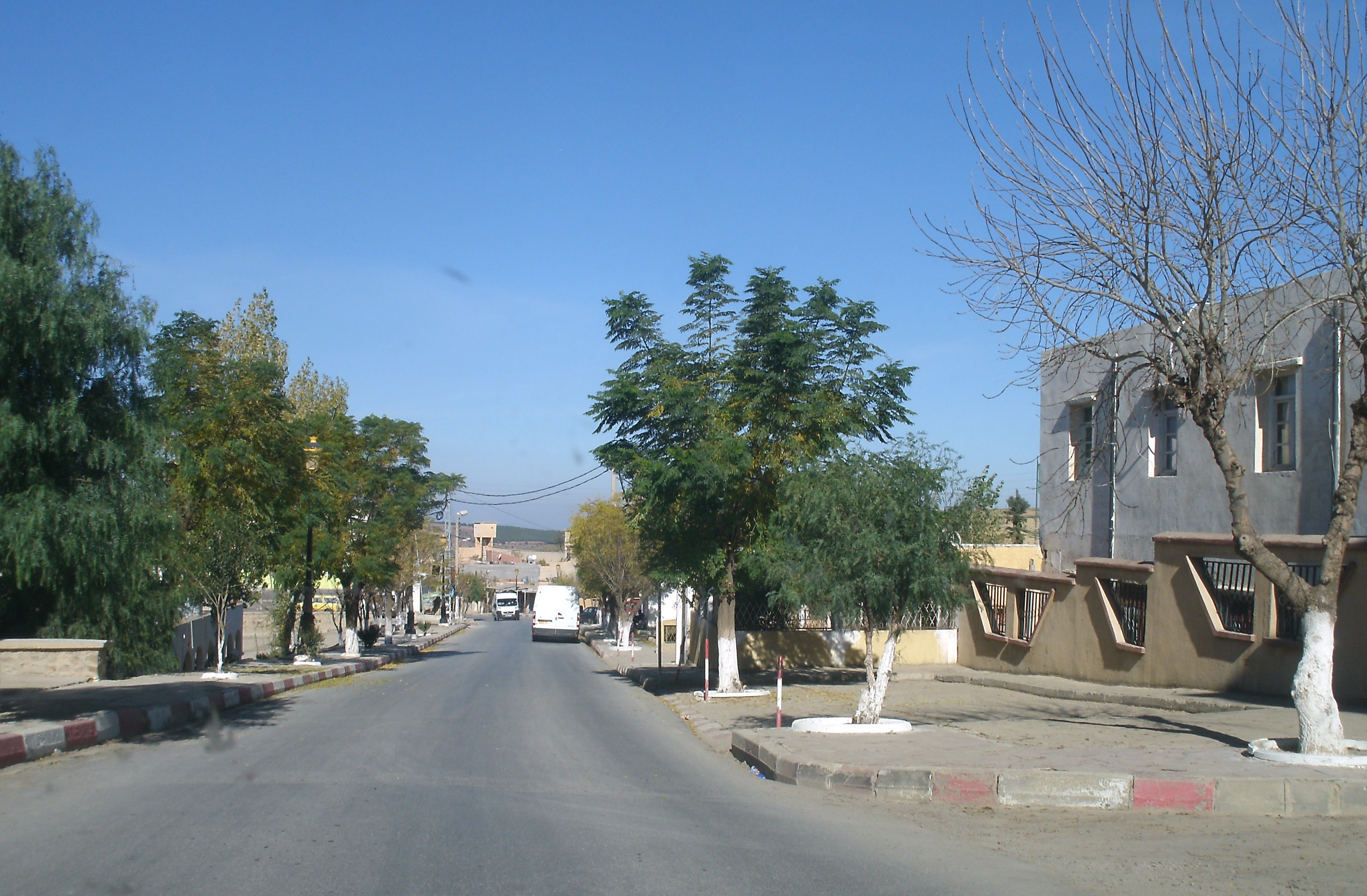
- Interactive map of Sidi Zahar
- Country: Algeria
- Province: Médéa Province

Population (1998)
  - Total: 8,018
- Time zone: UTC+1 (CET)

Sidi Zahar (Arabic: سيدي الزهار) is a town and commune in Médéa Province, Algeria. According to the 1998 census, it has a population of 8,018.
