= Sidi Mahdjoub =

Coordinates: 36°10′N 2°43′E

- Commune and town
- Interactive map of Sidi Mahdjoub
- Country: Algeria
- Province: Médéa Province
- Time zone: UTC+1 (CET)

Sidi Mahdjoub is a town and commune in Médéa Province, Algeria.
