= Tafraout, Médéa =

Commune and town in Médéa Province, Algeria

Tafraout تافراوت
- Commune and town
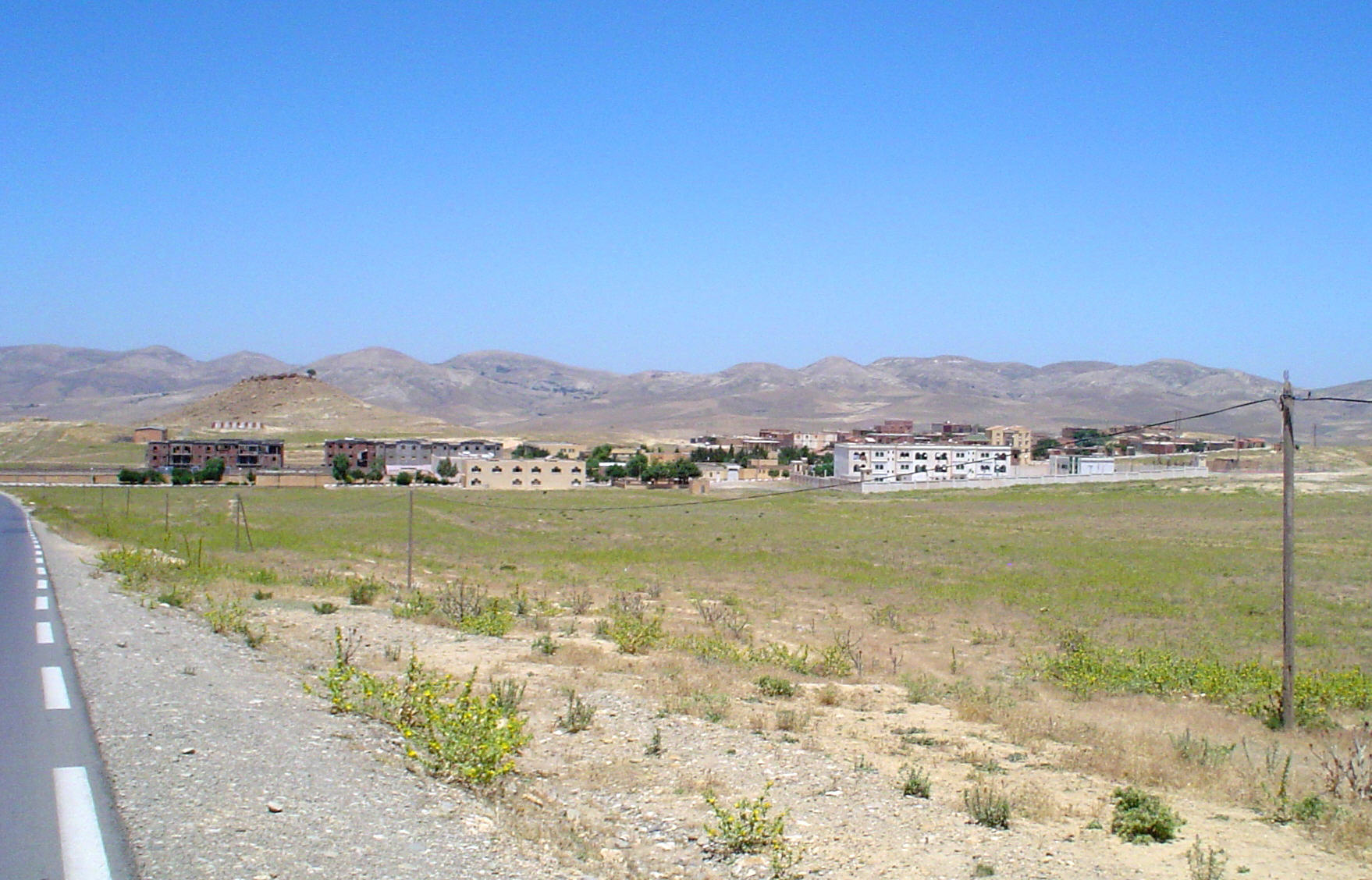

- Location within Algeria
- Coordinates: 35°58′17″N 3°21′7″E
- Country: Algeria
- Province: Médéa Province

Area
  - Total: 105 km^{2} (41 sq mi)

Population (2008)
  - Total: 8,901
- Time zone: UTC+1 (CET)
- CP: 26550

Tafraout, Médéa is a town and commune in Médéa Province, Algeria. According to the 2008 census, it has a population of 8,901.
