= Rebaia =

- Commune and town
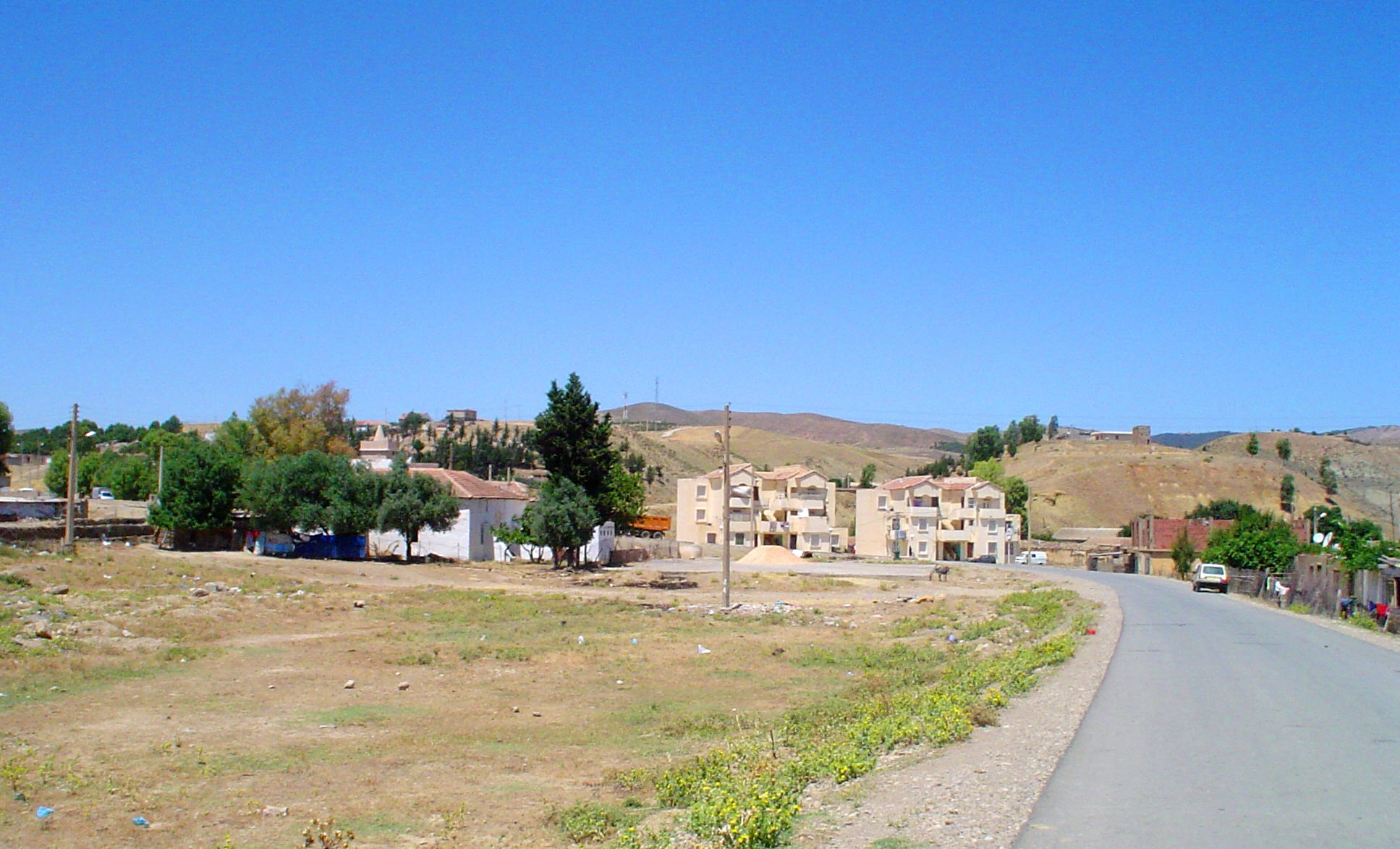

- Location within Algeria
- Coordinates: 36°1′40″N 3°8′17″E
- Country: Algeria
- Province: Médéa Province

Area
  - Total: 60 sq mi (155 km^{2})

Population (2008)
  - Total: 5,346
- Time zone: UTC+1 (CET)
- CP: 26270

Rebaia is a town and commune in Médéa Province, Algeria.
