= Aïn Ou Ksir =

- Commune and town
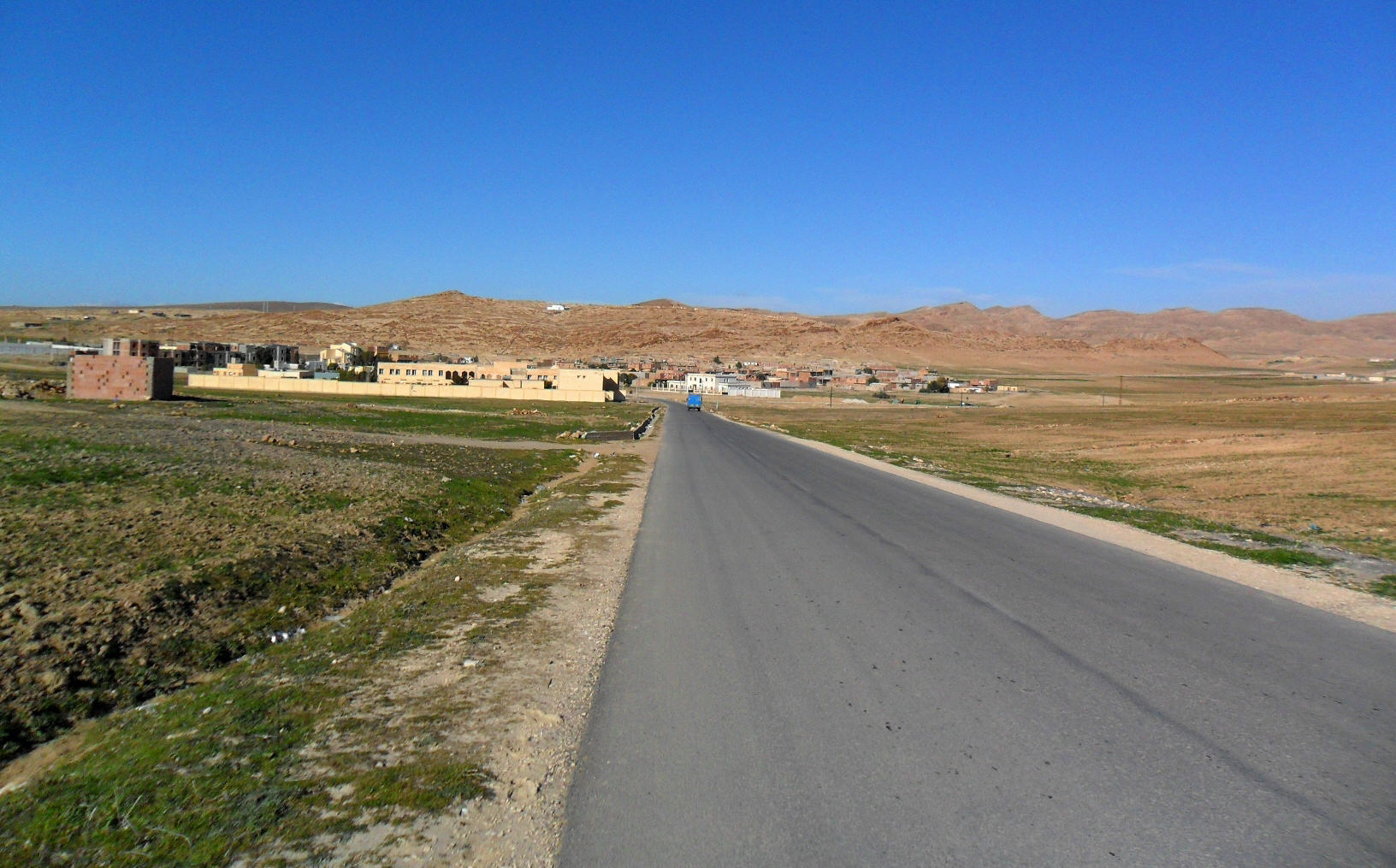

- Location within Algeria
- Country: Algeria
- Province: Médéa Province

Population (1998)
  - Total: 5,366
- Time zone: UTC+1 (CET)

Aïn Ou Ksir is a town and commune in Médéa Province, Algeria. According to the 1998 census, it has a population of 5,366.
