= Baata =

Coordinates: 36°21′48″N 3°06′38″E

- Commune and town
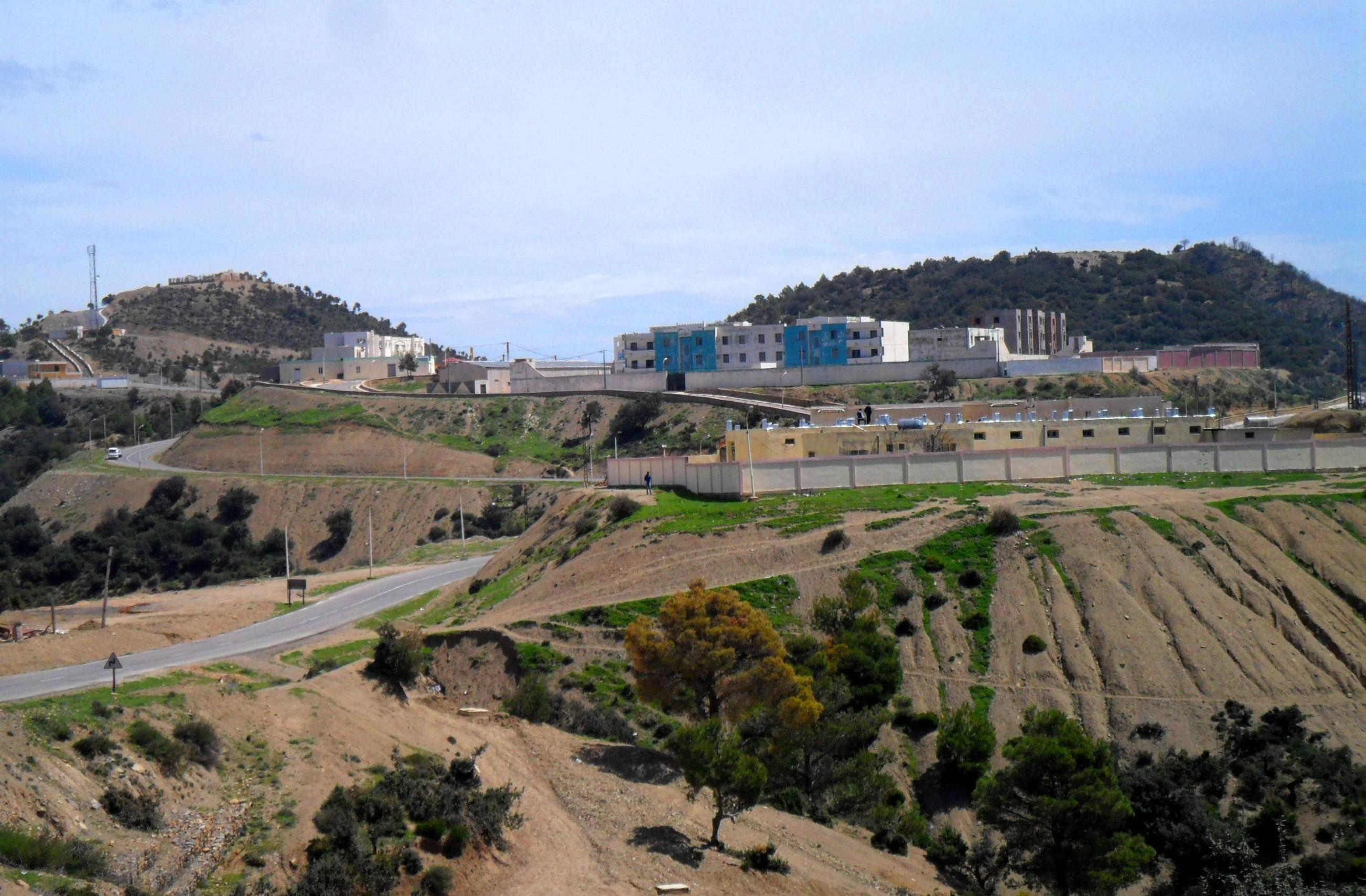
- Interactive map of Baata
- Country: Algeria
- Province: Médéa Province

Population (1998)
  - Total: 3,192
- Time zone: UTC+1 (CET)

Baata is a town and commune in Médéa Province, Algeria. According to the 1998 census, it has a population of 3,192.
