= Bou Aiche =

Coordinates: 35°33′10″N 2°21′31″E

- Commune and town
- Interactive map of Bou Aiche
- Country: Algeria
- Province: Médéa Province

Population (1998)
  - Total: 8,635
- Time zone: UTC+1 (CET)

Bou Aiche is a town and commune in Médéa Province, Algeria. According to the 1998 census, it has a population of 8,635.

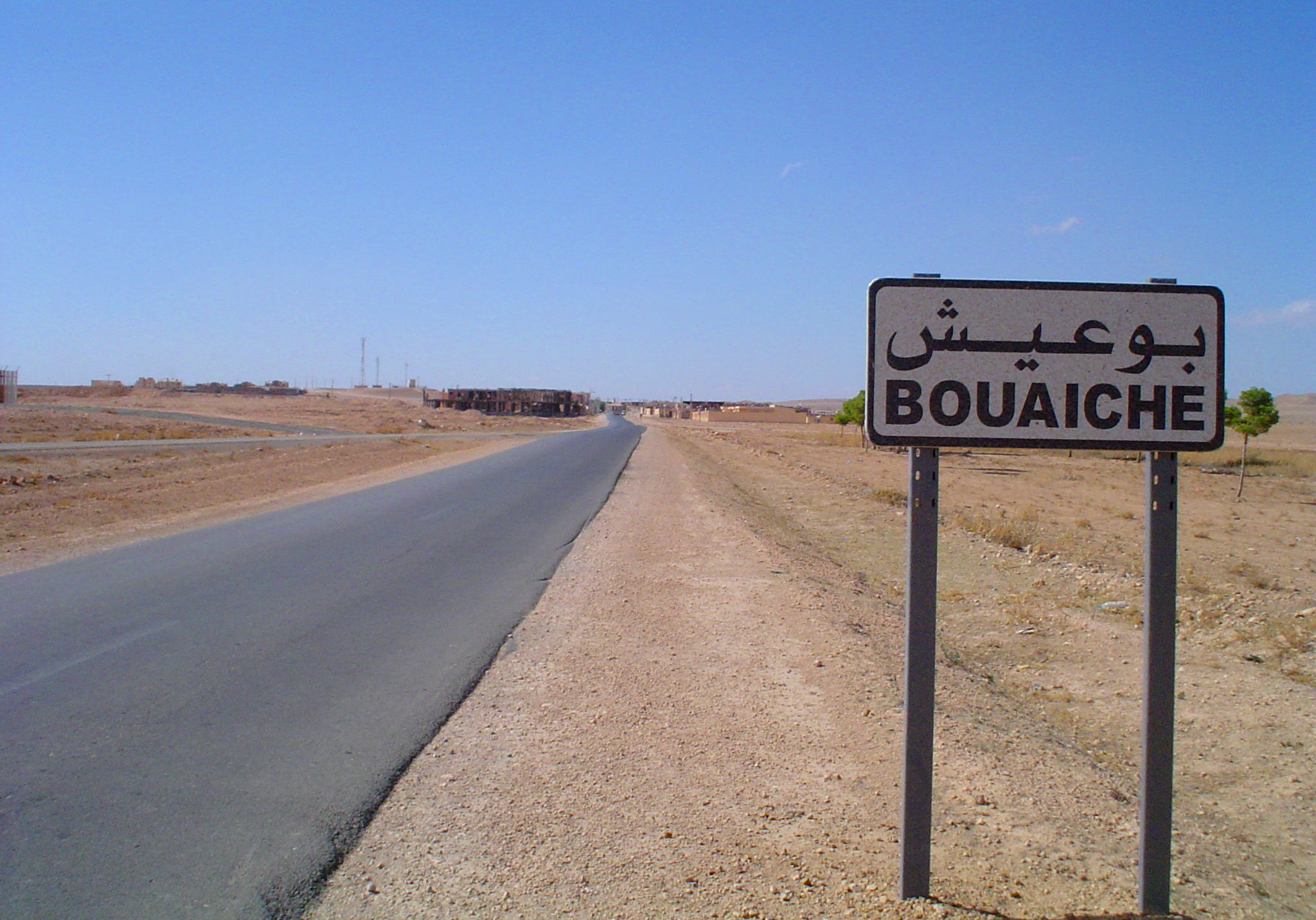
Bou Aiche
