= Ouzera =

Ouzera وزرة
- Commune and town
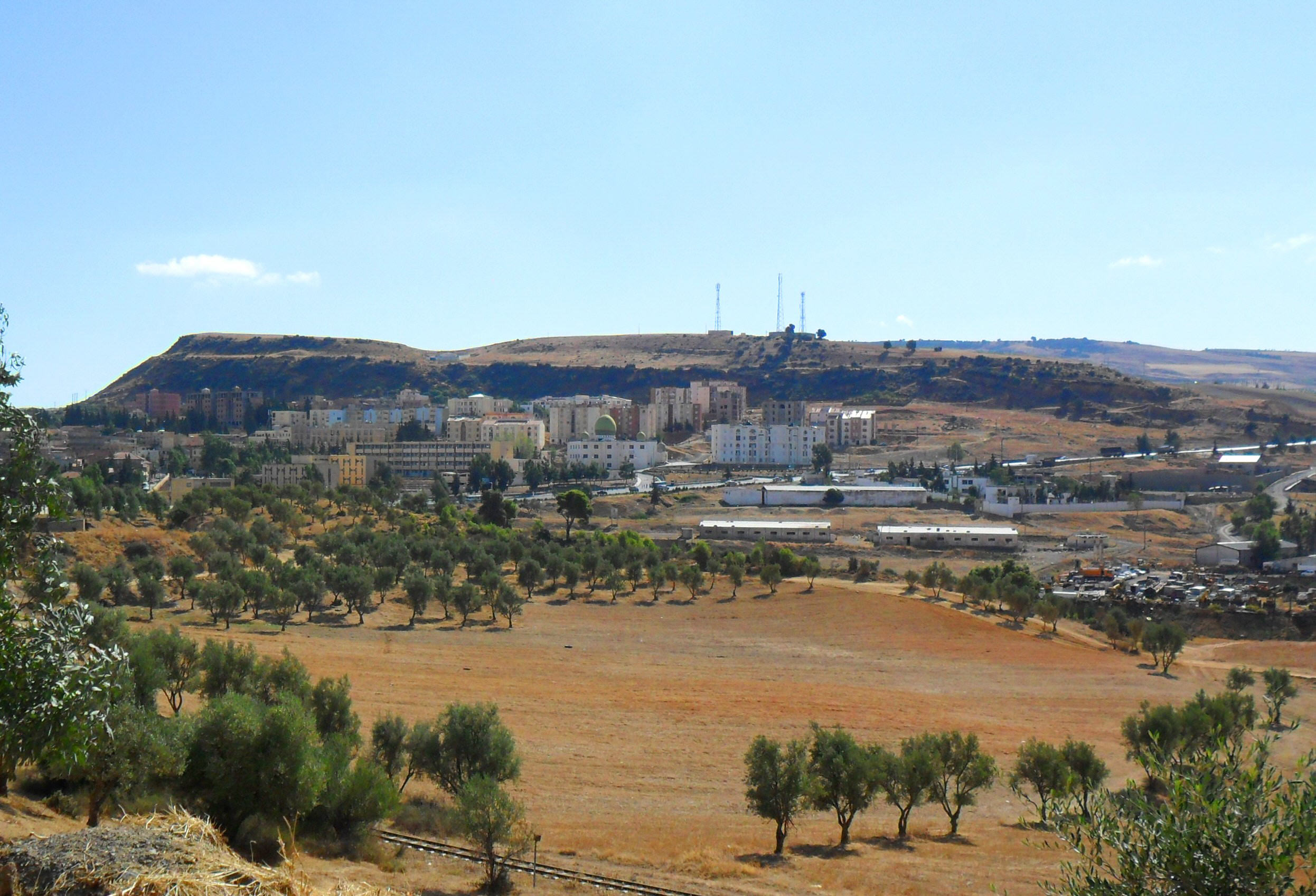

- Location within Algeria
- Country: Algeria
- Province: Médéa Province

Area
  - Total: 39 sq mi (101 km^{2})
- Elevation: 2,963 ft (903 m)

Population (2008)
  - Total: 12,650
  - Density: 329/sq mi (127.2/km^{2})
- Time zone: UTC+1 (CET)
- Postal code: 26100

Ouzera is a town and commune in Médéa Province, Algeria. As of 2008, its population was 12,650. It is located around 75 miles south of Algiers. The city is along the Tell Atlas mountain range and is just south of Chrea National Park. The climate is quite cool, averaging 50 to 60 degrees year round.
