= Challalat El Adhaoura =

- Commune and town
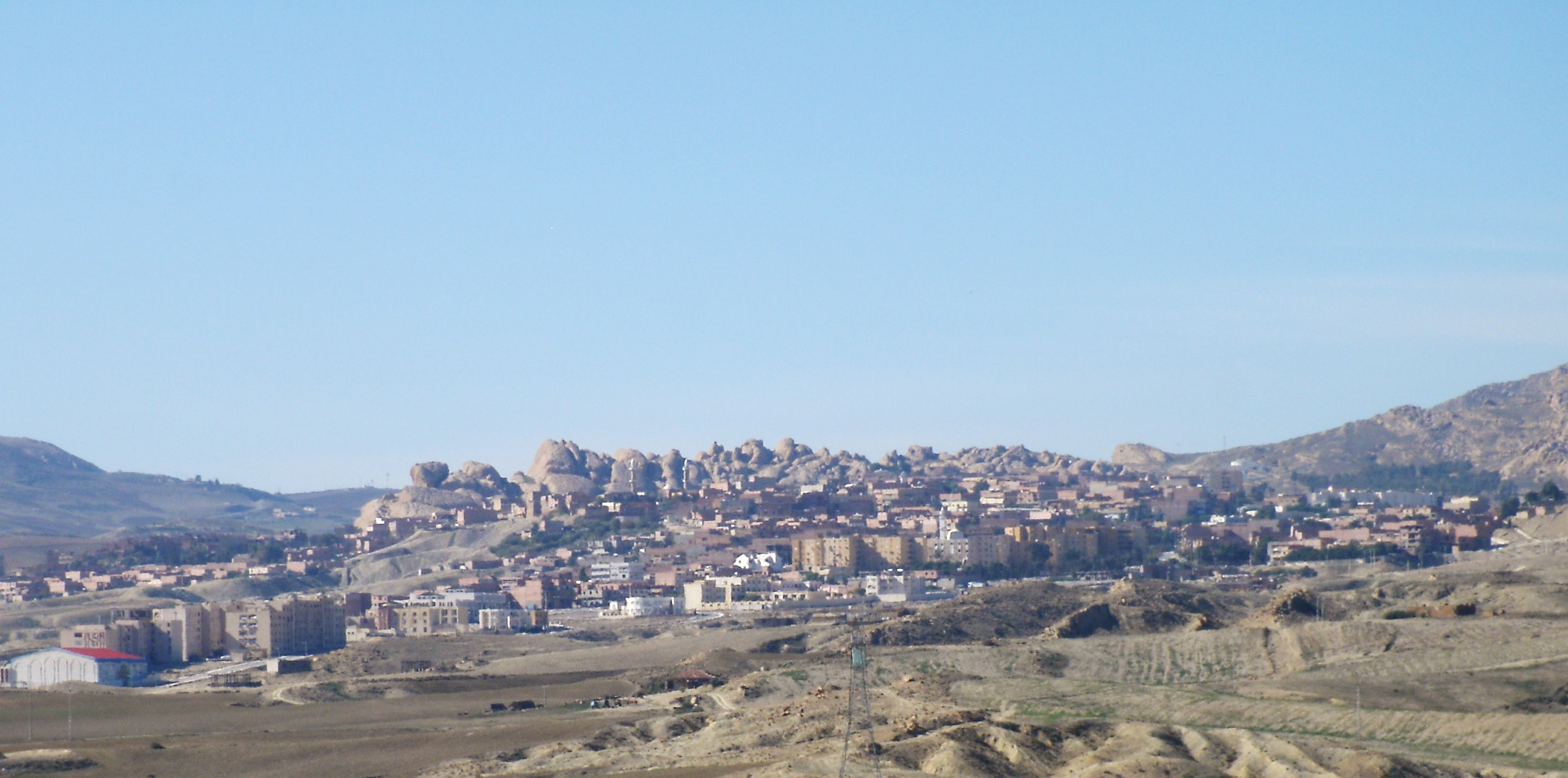
- Motto: شلالة العذاورة.png
- Location within Algeria
- Coordinates: 35°56′25″N 3°24′50″E
- Country: Algeria
- Province: Médéa Province

Population (2008)
  - Total: 26,077
- Time zone: UTC+1 (CET)

Challalat El Adhaoura is a town and commune in Médéa Province, Algeria. According to the 1998 census, it has a population of 23,214.
