= Sebt Aziz =

Aziz عزيز Sebt Aziz
- Commune and town
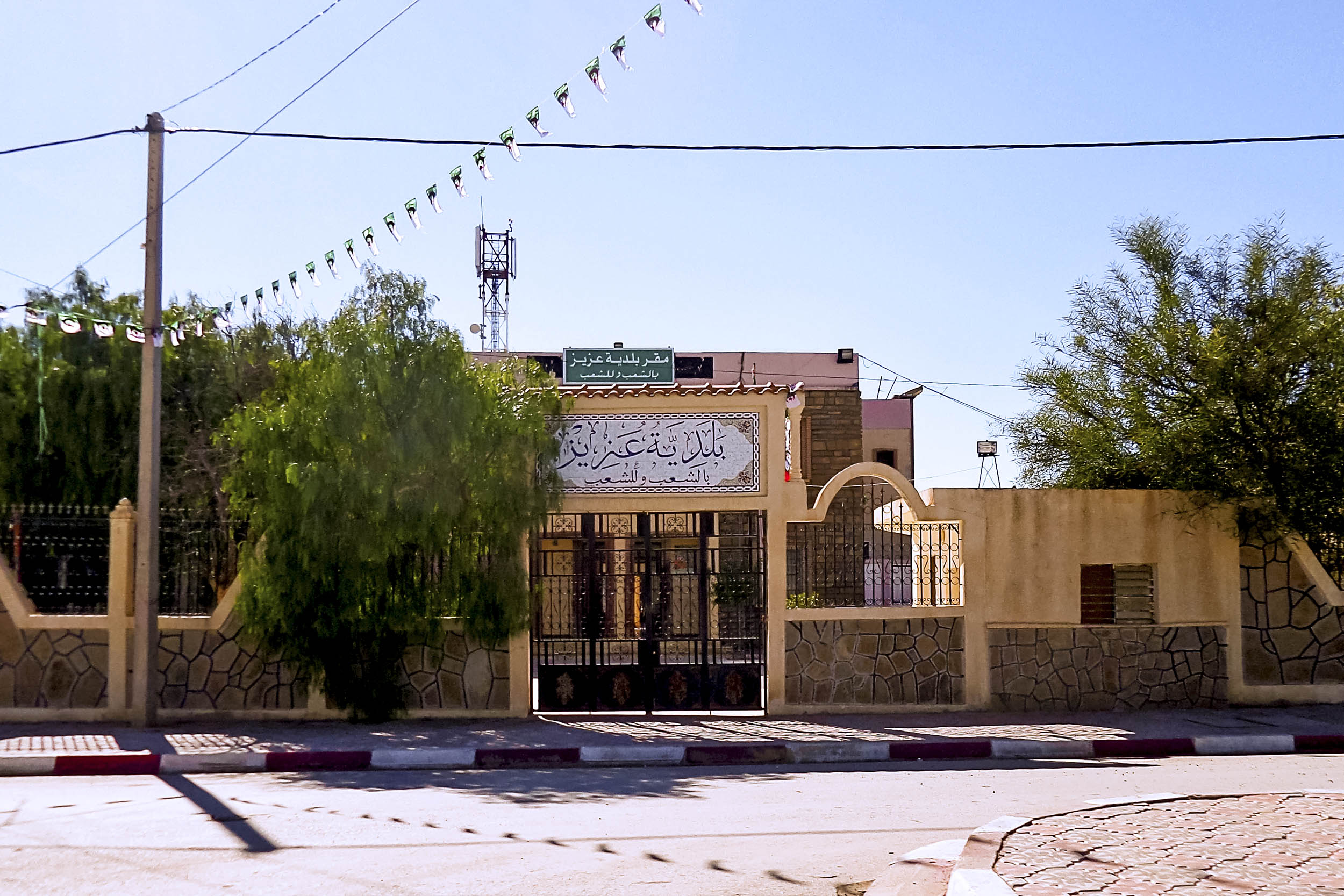

- Location within Algeria
- Coordinates: 35.816667°N 2.45°E
- Country: Algeria
- Province: Médéa Province
- Time zone: UTC+1 (CET)

Sebt Aziz is a town and commune in Médéa Province, Algeria.

Aziz, in (Arabic: عزيز 1,2), or Sebt Aziz is the largest municipality by its surface area of the Wilaya of Medea (or 6.23% of the total). It is the capital of a Daïra of the same name. It is located in médéa province and its timezone is UTC plus 1
