= Bir Ben Laabed =

Coordinates: 36°13′03″N 3°25′36″E

- Commune and town
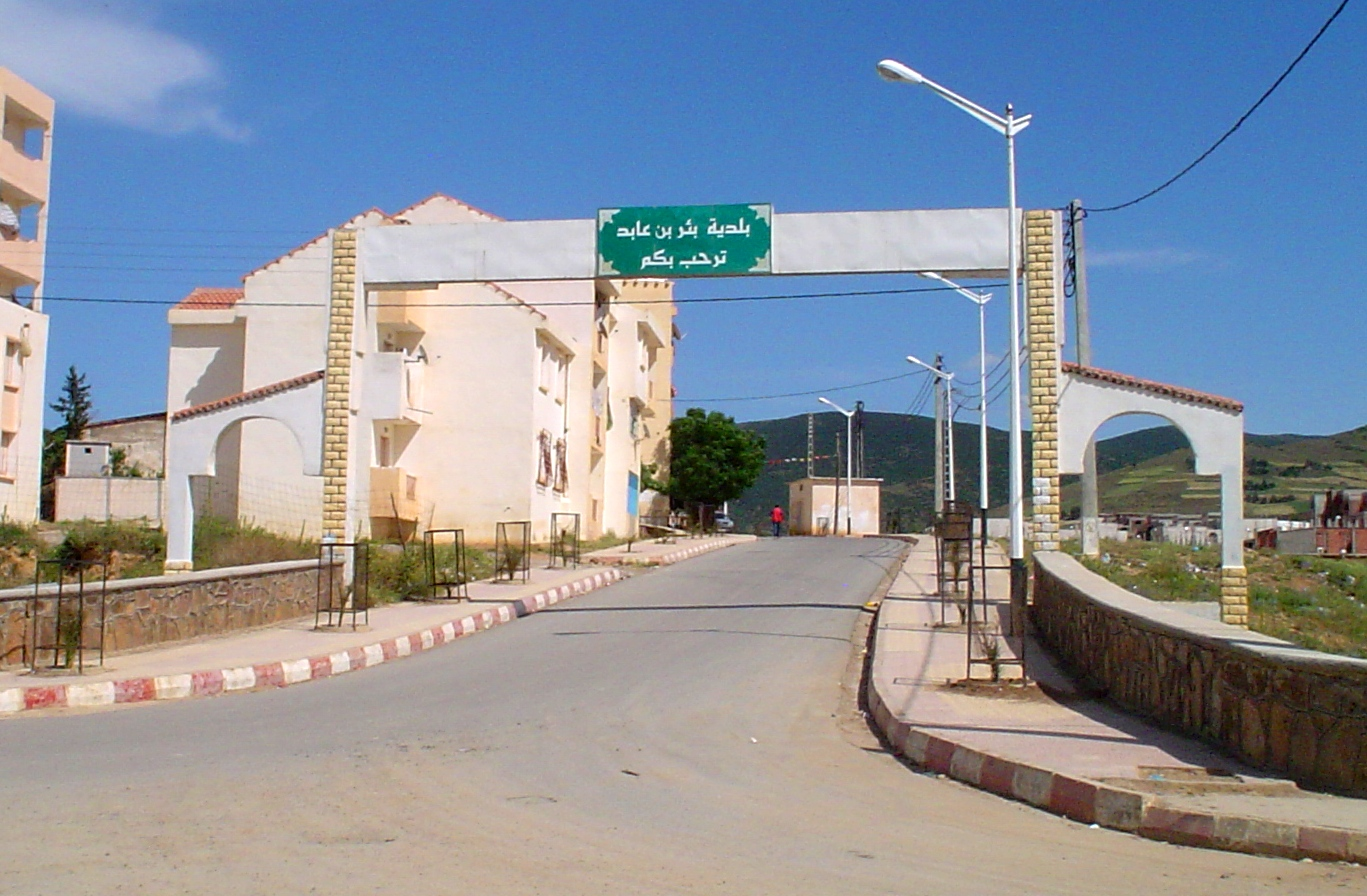
- Interactive map of Bir Ben Laabed
- Country: Algeria
- Province: Médéa Province

Population (1998)
  - Total: 10,543
- Time zone: UTC+1 (CET)

Bir Ben Laabed is a town and commune in Médéa Province, Algeria. According to the 1998 census, it has a population of 10,543.
