= Ouled Maaref =

Ouled Maaref أولاد معرف
- Commune and town
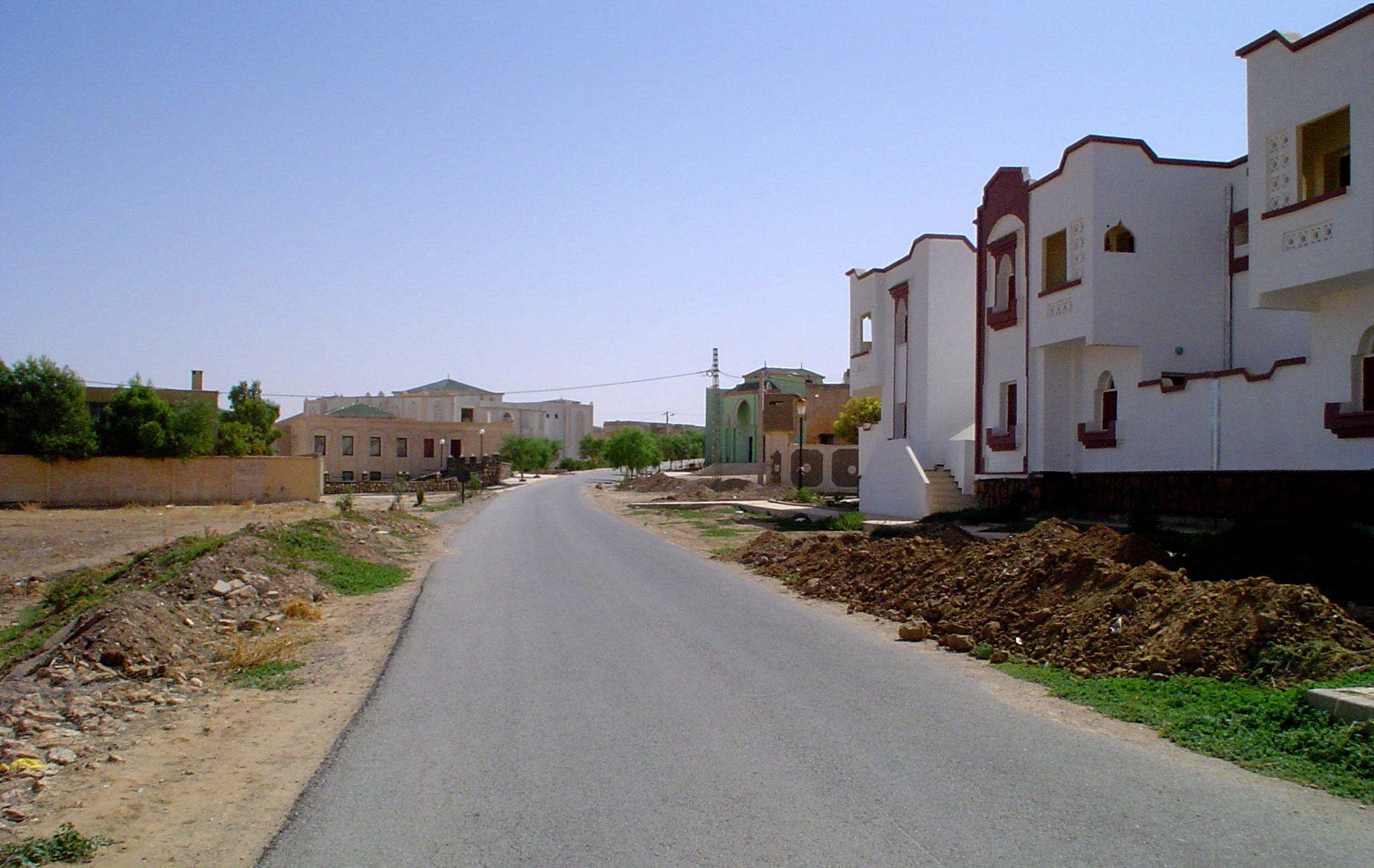

- Location within Algeria
- Country: Algeria
- Province: Médéa Province

Population (1998)
  - Total: 9,415
- Time zone: UTC+1 (CET)

Ouled Maaref is a town and commune in Médéa Province, Algeria. According to the 1998 census, it has a population of 9,415.
