= Maghraoua, Médéa =

Maghraoua مغراوة
- Commune and town
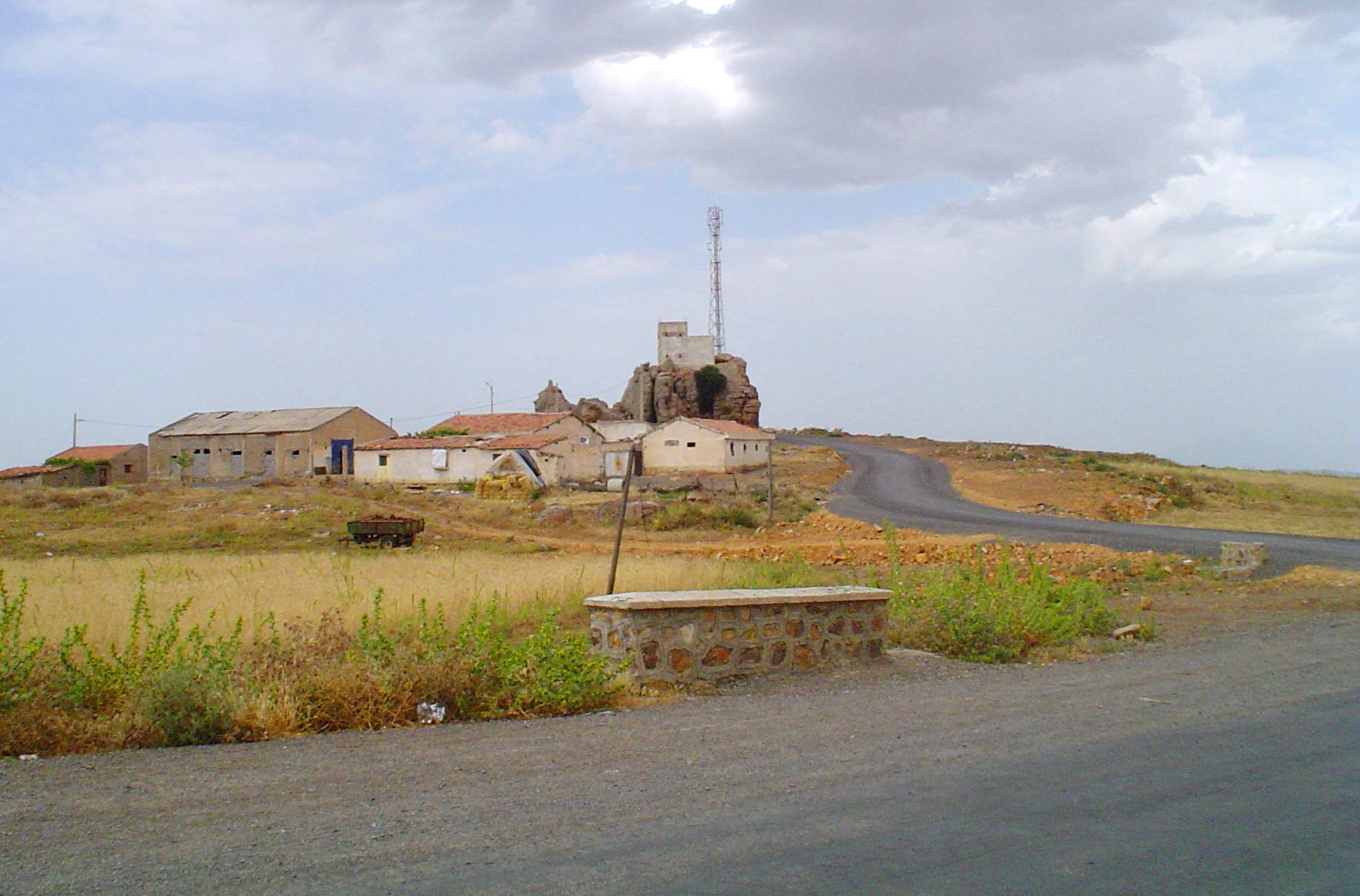

- Location within Algeria
- Coordinates: 36°21′5″N 3°32′7″E
- Country: Algeria
- Province: Médéa Province

Area
  - Total: 27.5 sq mi (71.2 km^{2})

Population (2008)
  - Total: 5,647
- Time zone: UTC+1 (CET)

Maghraoua, Médéa is a town and commune in Médéa Province, Algeria.
