= Medjebar =

Coordinates: 35°57′02″N 2°49′22″E

- Commune and town
- Interactive map of Medjebar
- Country: Algeria
- Province: Médéa Province

Population (1998)
  - Total: 5,686
- Time zone: UTC+1 (CET)

Medjebar is a town and commune in Médéa Province, Algeria. According to the 1998 census, it has a population of 5,686.
