= Chahbounia =

- Commune and town
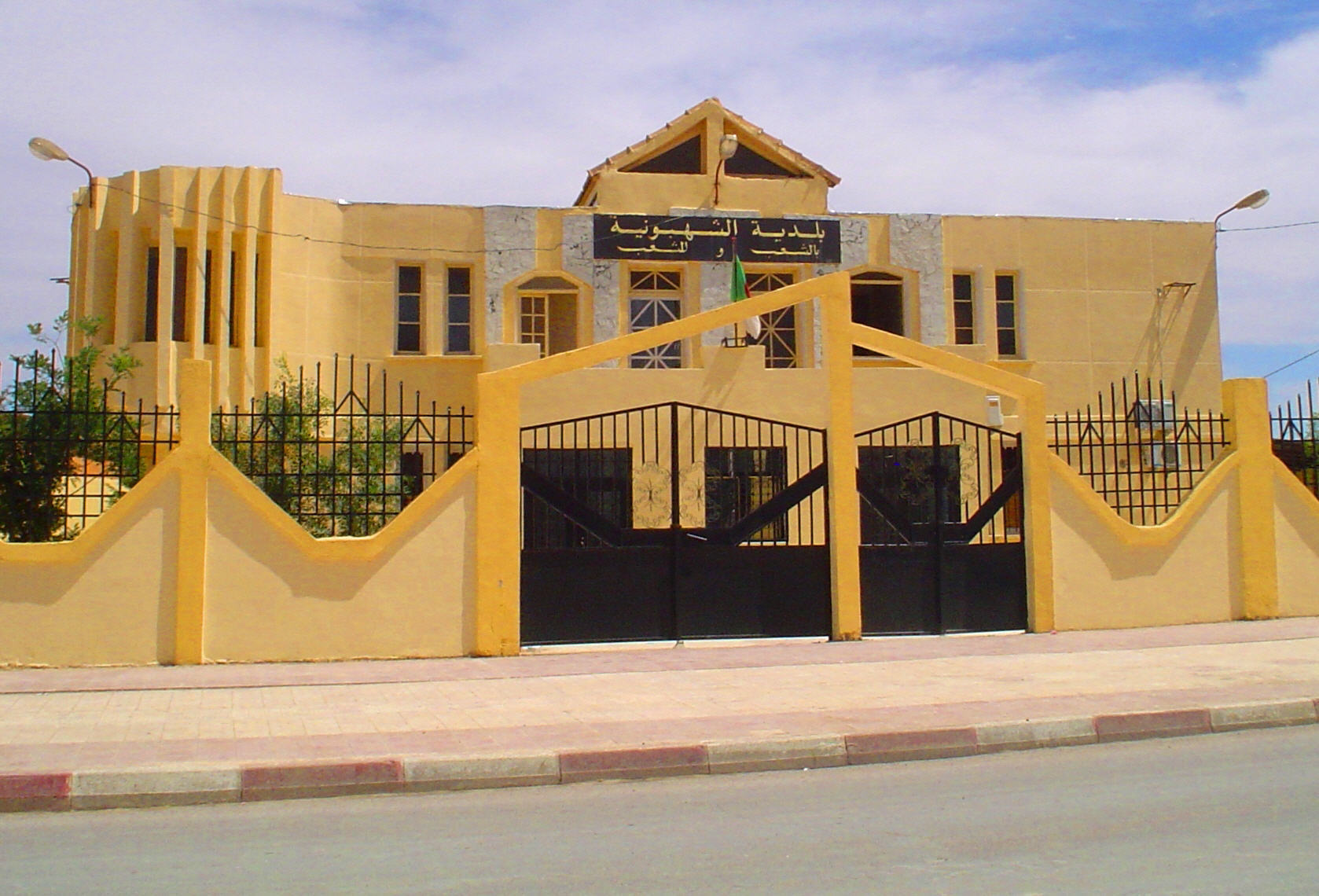

- Location within Algeria
- Coordinates: 35°32′41″N 2°36′12″E
- Country: Algeria
- Province: Médéa Province

Population (1998)
  - Total: 13,405
- Time zone: UTC+1 (CET)

Chahbounia is a town and commune in Médéa Province, Algeria. According to the 1998 census, it has a population of 13,405.
