= Bouskene =

Coordinates: 36°11′N 3°14′E

- Commune and town
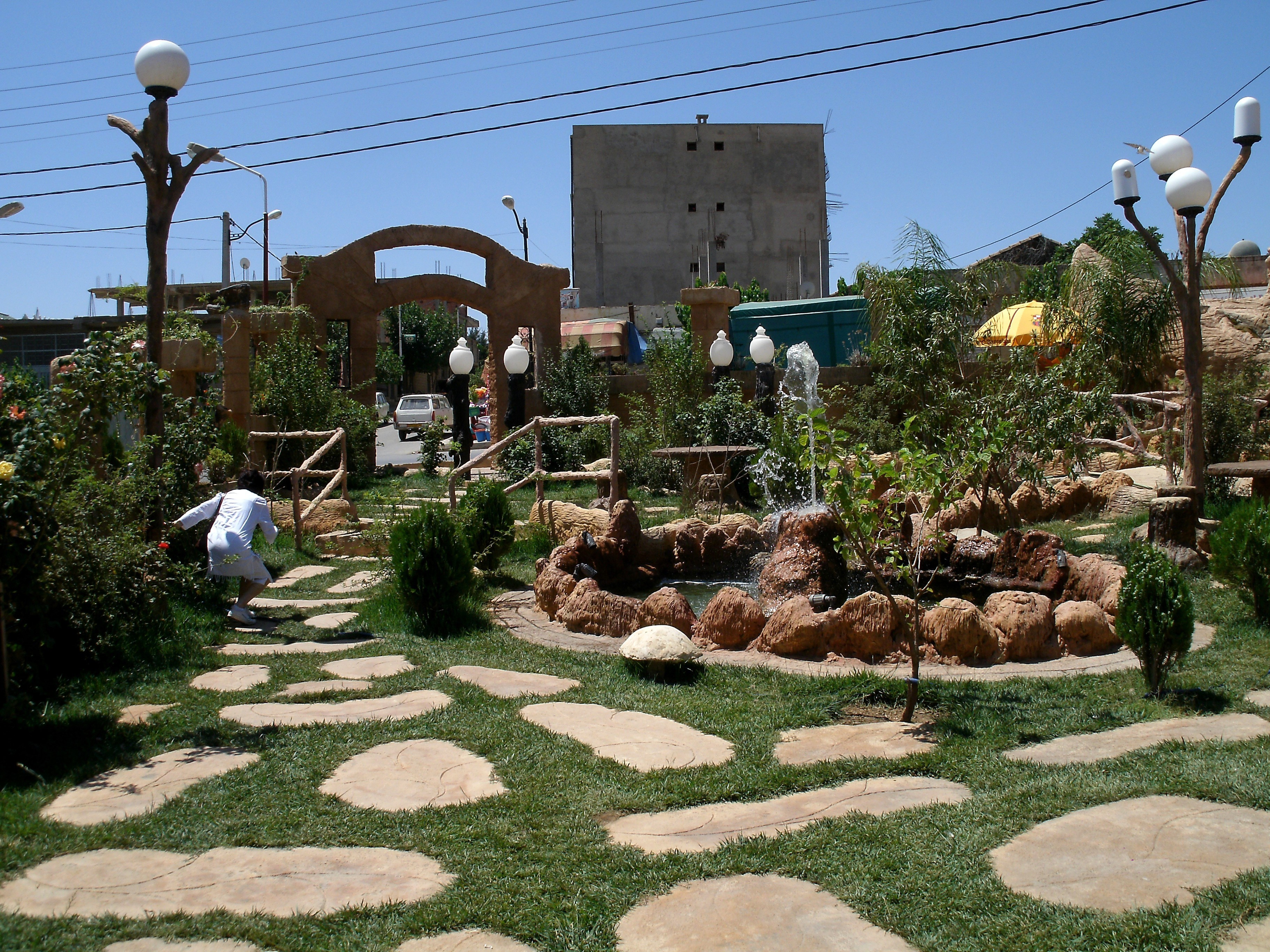
- Interactive map of Bouskene
- Country: Algeria
- Province: Médéa Province

Population (1998)
  - Total: 13,302
- Time zone: UTC+1 (CET)

Bouskene is a town and commune in Médéa Province, Algeria. According to the 1998 census, it has a population of 13,310.
