= Sedraia =

Coordinates: 36°14′34″N 3°31′43″E

- Commune and town
- Interactive map of Sedraia
- Country: Algeria
- Province: Médéa Province

Population (1998)
  - Total: 7,070
- Time zone: UTC+1 (CET)

Sedraia is a town and commune in Médéa Province, Algeria. According to the 1998 census, it has a population of 7,070.
