= Ouled Antar =

Coordinates: 35.94725°N 2.60231°E

- Commune and town
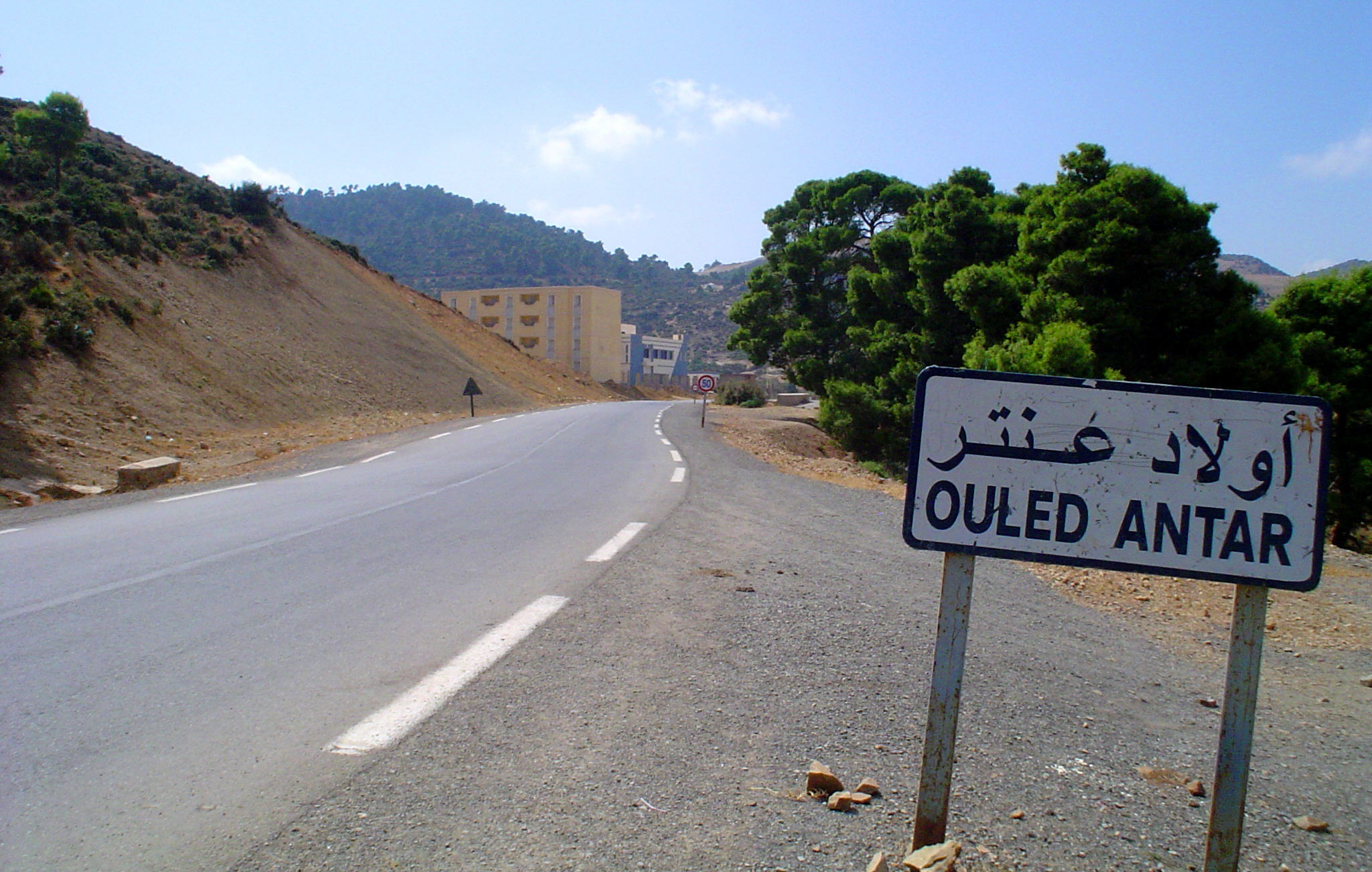
- Sign at the entrance of Ouled Antar
- Interactive map of Ouled Antar
- Country: Algeria
- Province: Médéa Province

Population (2008)
  - Total: 2,216
- Time zone: UTC+1 (CET)

Ouled Antar is a town and commune in Médéa Province, Algeria. It had a population of 2,216 as of 2008.
