= Aissaouia =

Coordinates: 36°25′09″N 3°12′58″E

- Commune and town
- Interactive map of Aissaouia
- Country: Algeria
- Province: Médéa Province
- Time zone: UTC+1 (CET)

Aissaouia is a town and commune in Médéa Province, Algeria.
