= Ouled Hellal =

- Commune and town
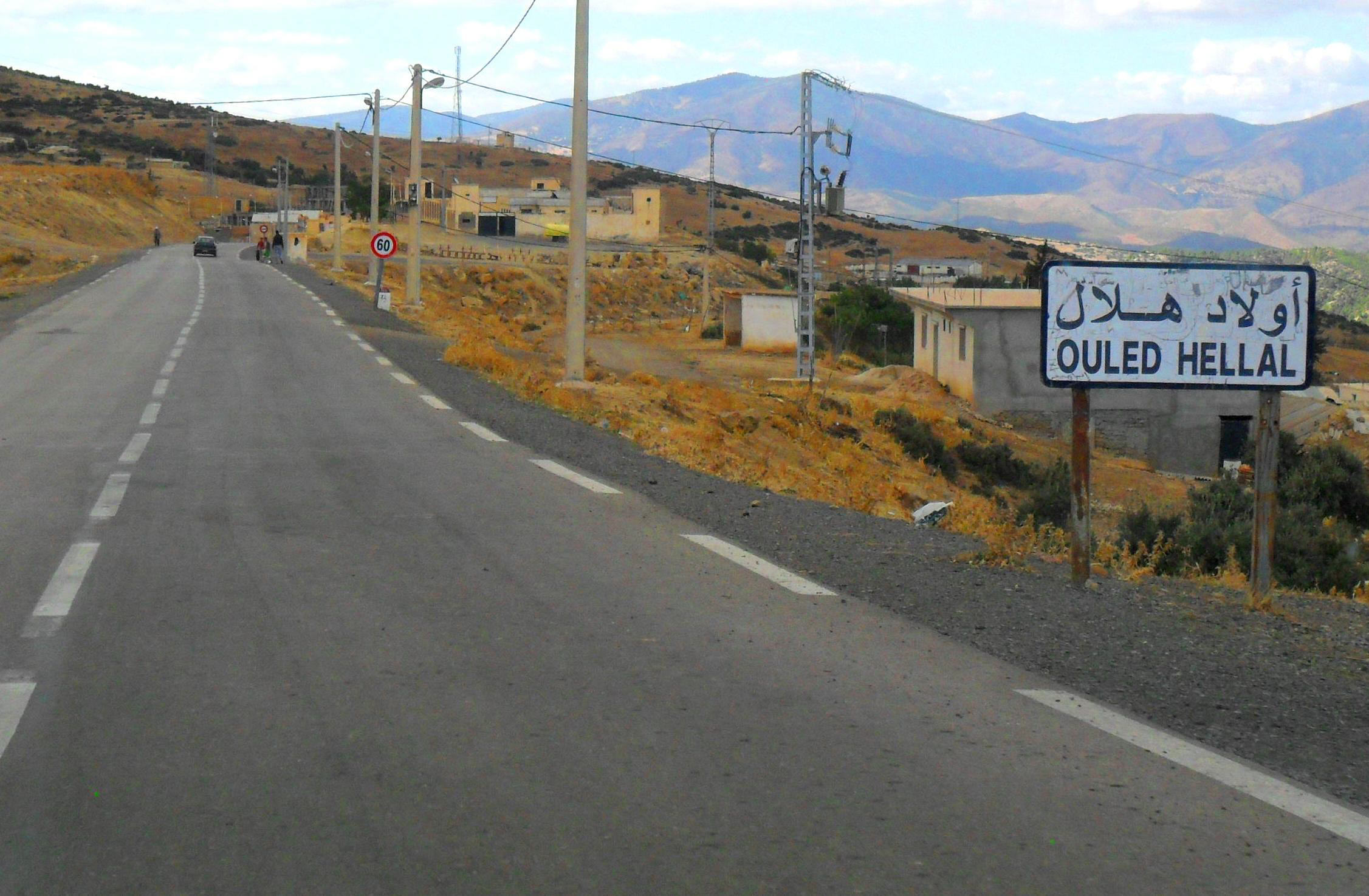

- Location within Algeria
- Country: Algeria
- Province: Médéa Province

Population (1998)
  - Total: 3,062
- Time zone: UTC+1 (CET)

Ouled Hellal is a town and commune in Médéa Province, Algeria. During the 1998 census, it had a population of 3,062.
