= El Ouinet =

- Commune and town
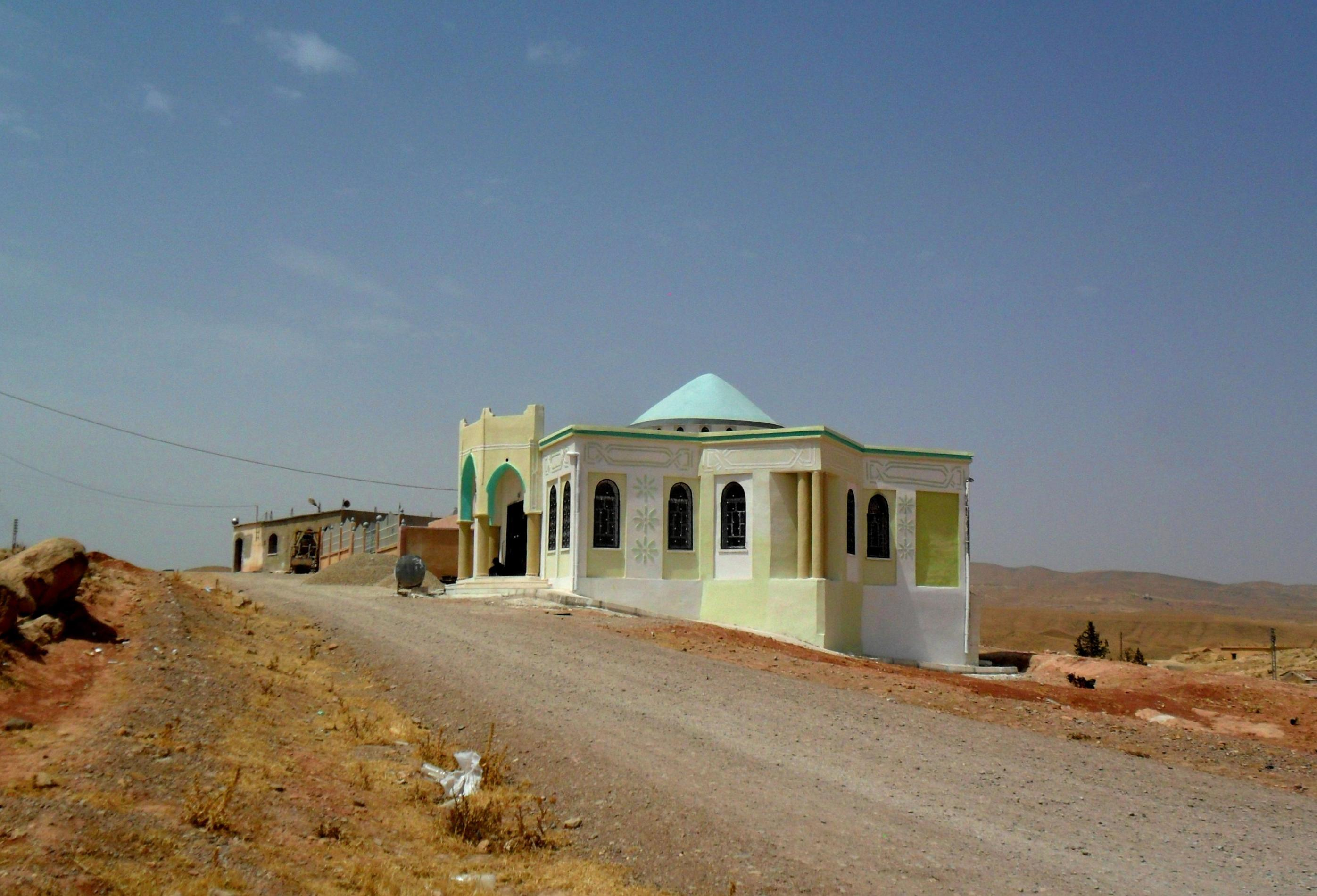

- Location of Abalessa within Algeria
- Coordinates: 35°53′38″N 3°02′08″E
- Country: Algeria
- Province: Médéa Province

Population (1998)
  - Total: 3,366
- Time zone: UTC+1 (CET)

El Ouinet is a town and commune in Médéa Province, Algeria. According to the 1998 census, it has a population of 3,366.
