= Mefatha =

Coordinates: 35°53′01″N 2°55′54″E

- Commune and town
- Interactive map of Mefatha
- Country: Algeria
- Province: Médéa Province

Population (1998)
  - Total: 4,442
- Time zone: UTC+1 (CET)

Mefatha is a town and commune in Médéa Province, Algeria. According to the 1998 census, it has a population of 4,442.
