= Draa Essamar =

Draa Essamar ذراع السمار
- Commune and town
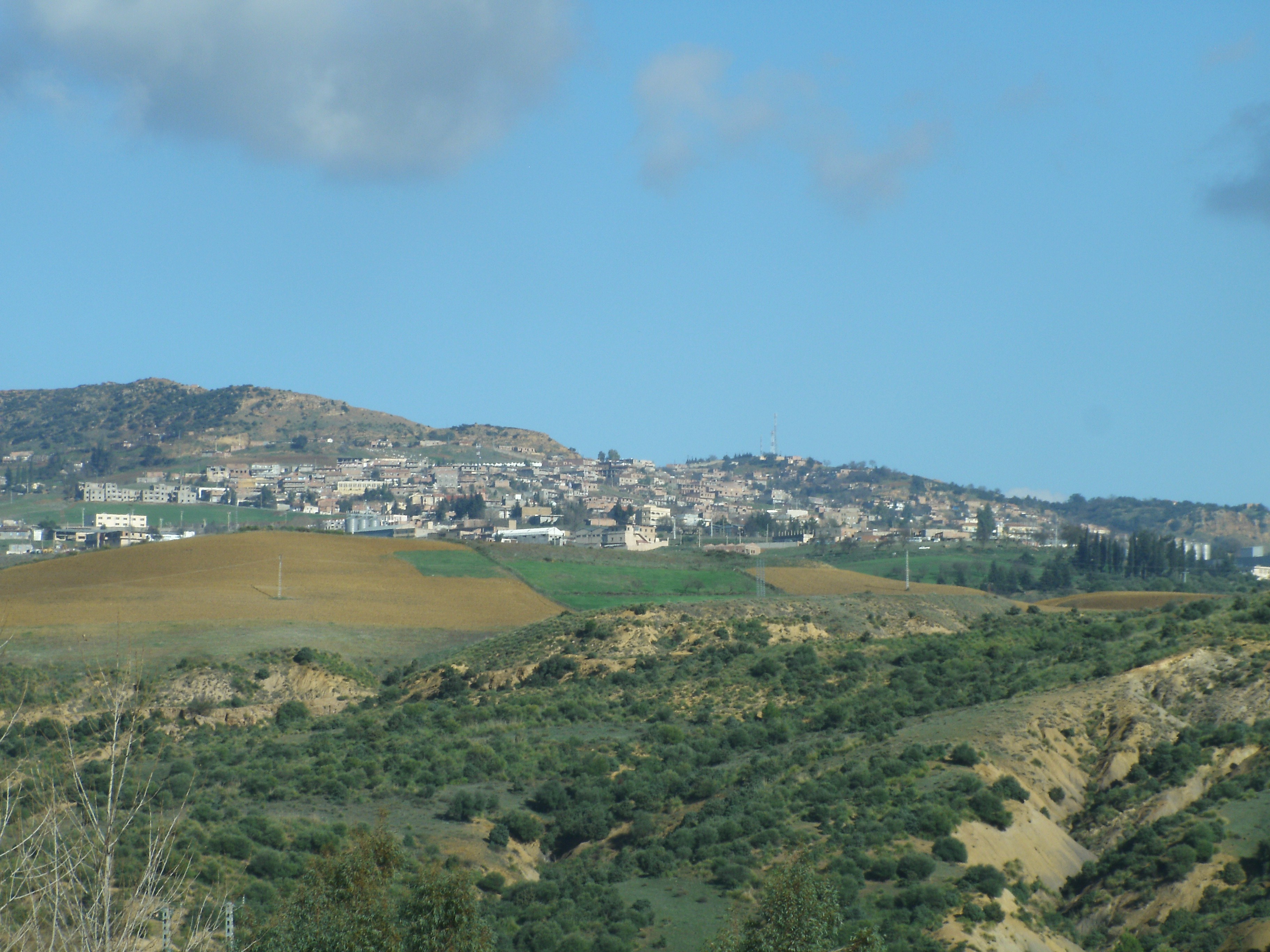

- Location within Algeria
- Coordinates: 36°16′25″N 2°43′1″E
- Country: Algeria
- Province: Médéa Province

Population (1998)
  - Total: 7,465
- Time zone: UTC+1 (CET)

Draa Essamar is a town and commune in Médéa Province, Algeria. According to the 1998 census, it has a population of 7,465.
