= Khams Djouamaa =

Coordinates: 36°09′30″N 3°08′25″E

- Commune and town
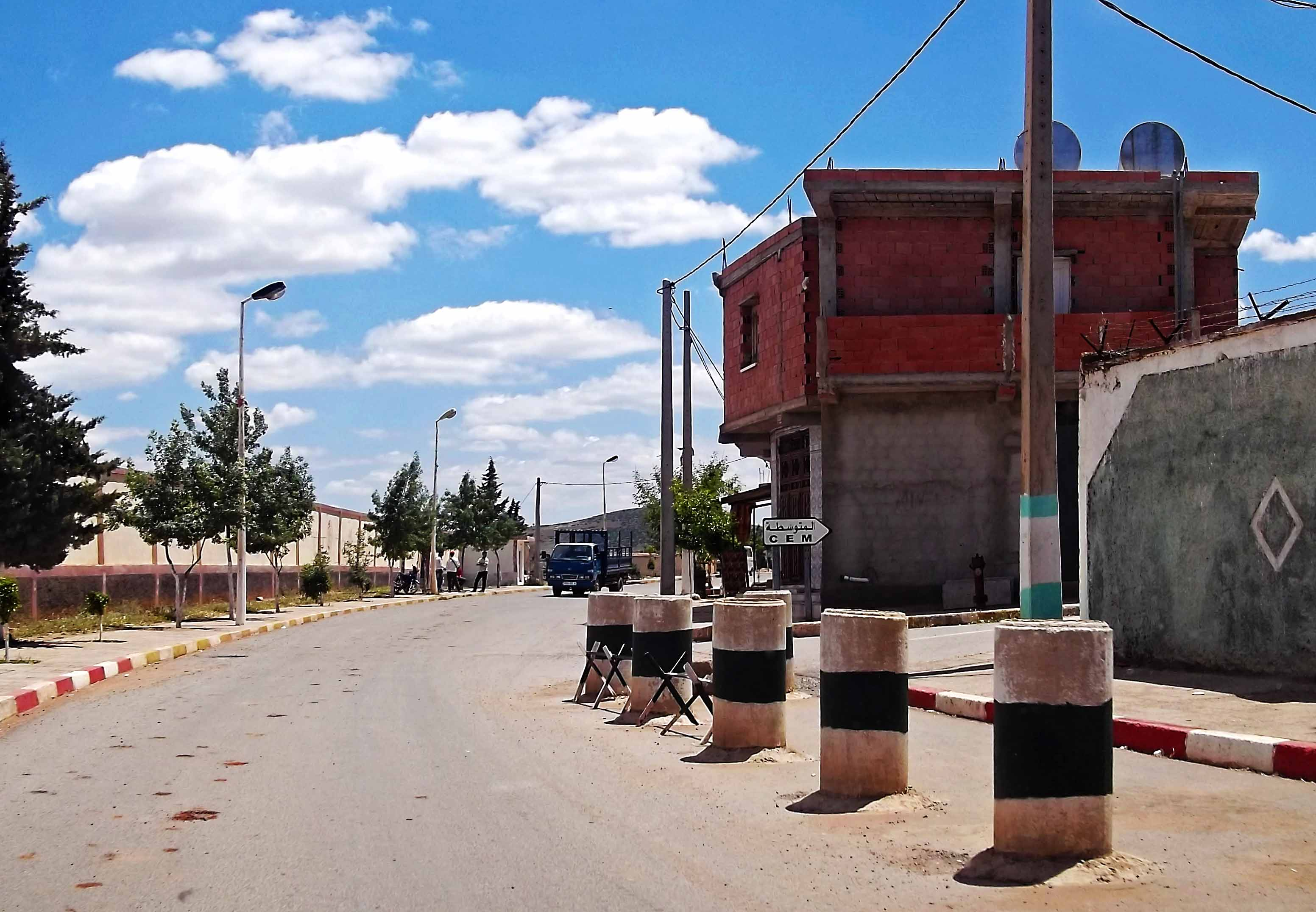
- Interactive map of Khams Djouamaa
- Country: Algeria
- Province: Médéa Province

Population (1998)
  - Total: 7,588
- Time zone: UTC+1 (CET)

Khams Djouamaa is a town and commune in Médéa Province, Algeria. According to the 1998 census, it has a population of 7,588.
