= Oum El Djalil =

Coordinates: 35°49′39″N 2°37′26″E

- Commune and town
- Interactive map of Oum El Djalil
- Country: Algeria
- Province: Médéa Province

Population (1998)
  - Total: 3,664
- Time zone: UTC+1 (CET)

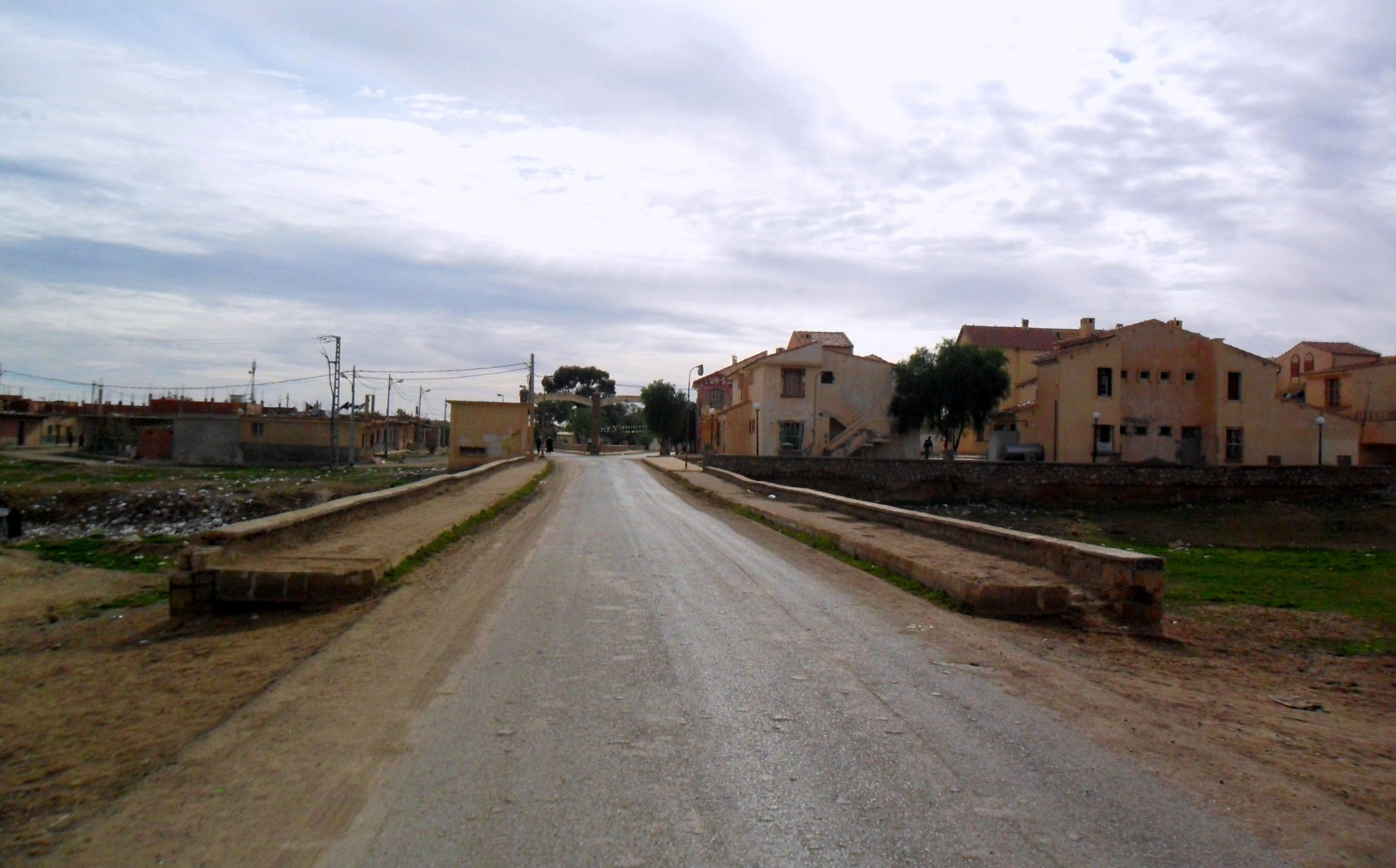
A panoramic view of Oum El Djalil

Oum El Djalil is a town and commune in Médéa Province, Algeria. According to the 1998 census, it has a population of 3,664.
