= Mihoub =

Mihoub ميهوب
- Commune and town
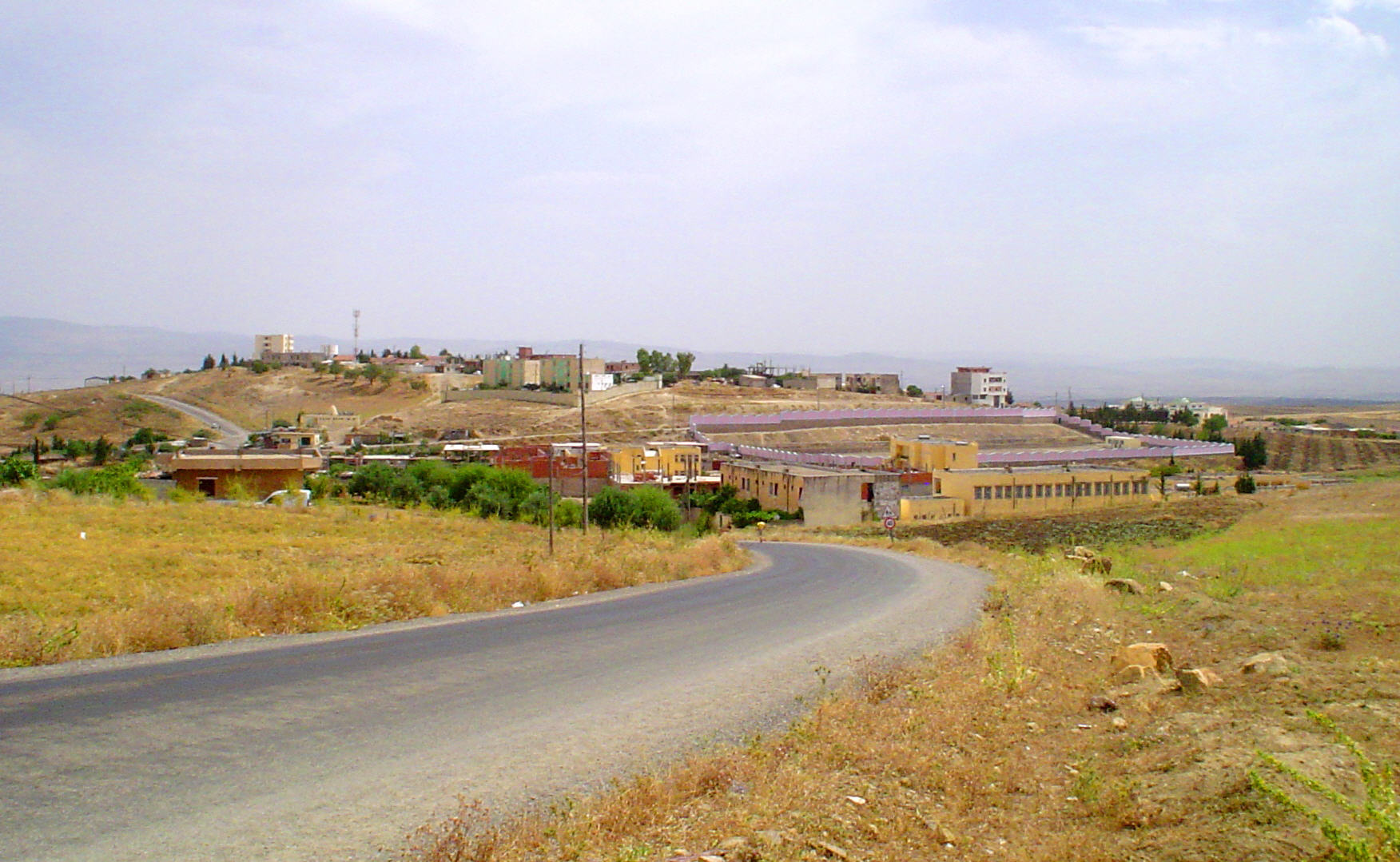

- Location within Algeria
- Coordinates: 36°21′11″N 3°28′33″E
- Country: Algeria
- Province: Médéa Province

Area
  - Total: 40.51 sq mi (104.92 km^{2})

Population (2008)
  - Total: 12,191
- Time zone: UTC+1 (CET)

Mihoub is a town and commune in Médéa Province, Algeria. According to the 1998 census, it has a population of 11,488.
