= Ouled Brahim =

Coordinates: 36°14′40″N 2°56′01″E

- Commune and town
- Interactive map of Ouled Brahim
- Country: Algeria
- Province: Médéa Province

Population (1998)
  - Total: 9,870
- Time zone: UTC+1 (CET)

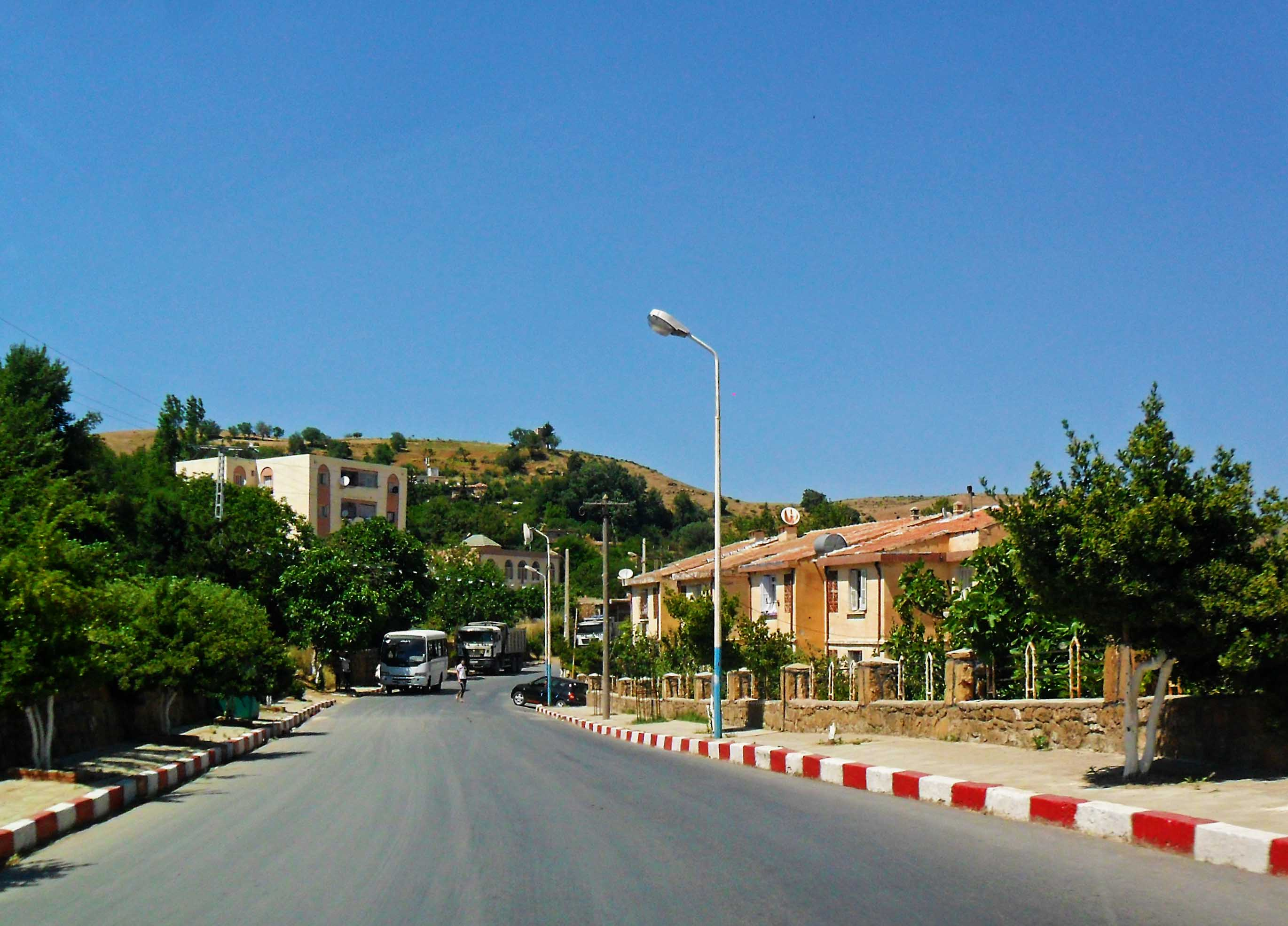

Ouled Brahim is a town and commune in Médéa Province, Algeria. According to the 1998 census, it has a population of 9,870.
