= Zuccabar =

Roman colony in present-day Algeria

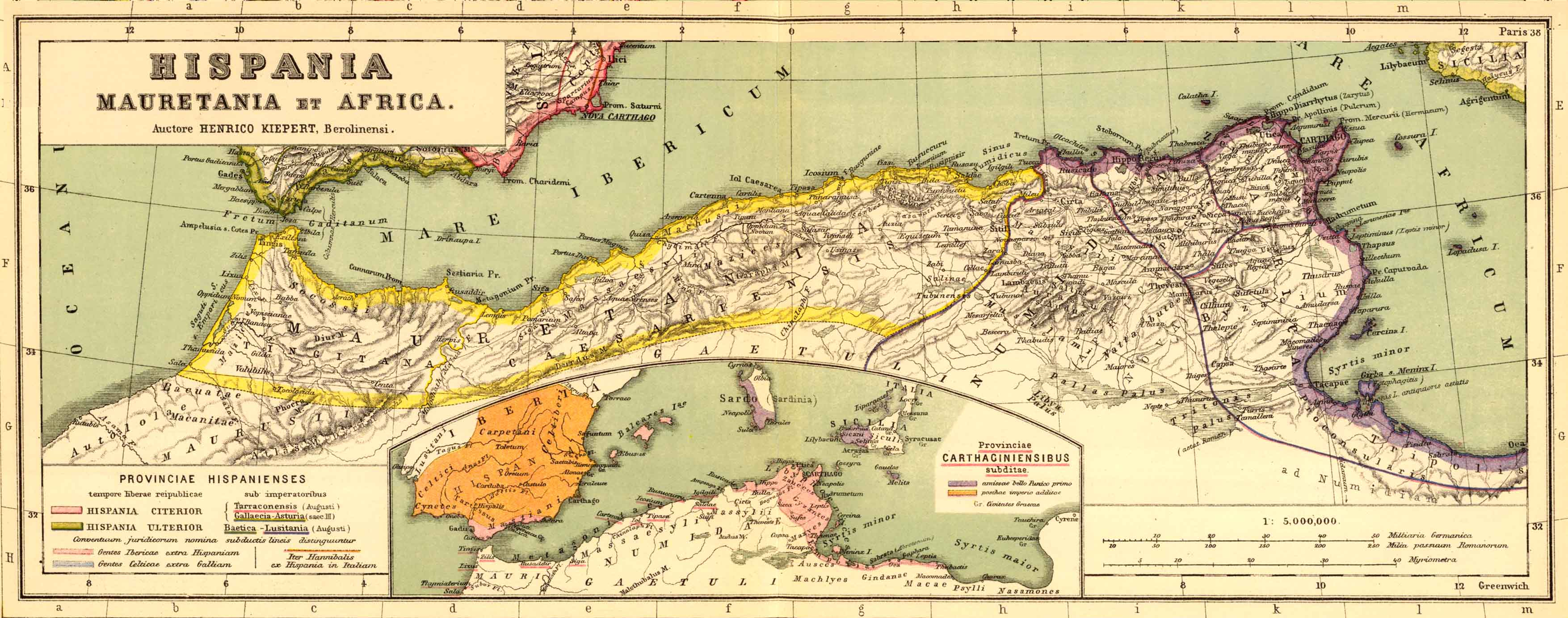
- Map showing Zuccabar just south of Caesarea of Mauretania

- Location within Algeria
- 36.265833°N 2.297222°E
- Location: Algeria
- Region: Aïn Defla Province

Zuccabar (or Zucchabar) was an ancient town in the Roman province of Mauretania Caesariensis. It is located in present-day Miliana, Algeria.

== History ==
Zuccabar was constituted as a Roman colony (Colonia Iulia Augusta Zucchabar) under the Emperor Augustus.

Actual Miliana corresponds to the town of Punic origin known in Roman times as "Zucchabar" (or even "Succhabar"). Under Augustus, it was given the rank of colonia and was thus referred to as Colonia Iulia Augusta Zucchabar. The Greek form of the name used by the geographer Ptolemy was Ζουχάββαρι (Zuchabbari). Pliny the Elder calls it "the colony of Augusta, also called Succabar", and Ammianus Marcellinus gives it the name Sugabarri or (in adjectival form) Sugabarritanum.

Zuccabar belonged to the Roman province of Mauretania Caesariensis and was located 70 km south of the capital Caesarea, with a population of nearly 5,000 inhabitants (mostly romanised berbers).

Zucchabar became a Christian episcopal see in the fourth century. The names of two of its Catholic bishops and one Donatist are recorded:

- Maximianus, who attended the Conference of Carthage (411);
  - Germanus, the Donatist bishop who attended the same conference;
- Stephanus, one of the Catholic bishops whom Huneric summoned to a meeting in Carthage in February 484 and then exiled.

The bishopric is included in the Catholic Church's list of titular sees. In late antiquity it was an episcopal see that has been "born again" as a titular see of the Roman Catholic Church since 1967.

Miliana was (re)founded in the 10th century by Buluggin ibn Ziri on the site of the ancient Roman city of Zuccabar (or "Succhabar").

== Bibliography ==
- Lawless, R. Mauretania Caesartiensis: archeological and geographical survey. Durham University. Durham, 1969 Zuccabar
- Lepelley, Claude. Rome et l'intégration de l'Empire, 44 av. J.-C. – 260 ap., T. 2, « Approches régionales du Haut-Empire romain », Nouvelles Clio, 1998
- Prevost, Virginie. Les dernières communautés chrétiennes autochthones d'Afrique du Nord. Armand Colin ed. (p. 461-483)
- Smith Reid, James. The Municipalities of the Roman Empire The University of Michigan Press. Chicago, 1913

== See also ==
- Caesarea of Mauretania
- Castellum Tingitanum
- Rapidum
- Icosium
