= Igilgili =

Archaeological site in Algeria

- Igilgili was located between Icosium (Algiers) and Hippo Regius (Annaba)

- Location within Algeria
- 36°49′00″N 5°46′00″E
- Location: Algeria
- Region: Jijel Province

Igilgili was a Berber town and a Phoenician, Carthaginian, and Roman colony in located in present-day Jijel, Algeria.

== History ==
Igilgili was initially a small Carthaginian colony and trading port (Punic: 𐤀𐤉𐤂𐤋𐤂𐤋, ʾyglgl, or 𐤀𐤉𐤂𐤋𐤂𐤋𐤕, ʾyglglt). This name seems to combine ʾy (Punic: 𐤀𐤉, "island") with a suffix that might be either Semitic or Berber.

After the Punic Wars, Igilgili was given to Rome's allies in North Africa. After the defeat of Jugurtha by Rome and its allies in 105 BC, the city came under direct Roman rule. It was turned into a Roman colony under Augustus in 33 BC, giving its people Roman citizenship. Once the Romans occupied the whole of North Africa, the city of Igilgili was administratively attached to the Roman province of Mauretania Caesariensis and later to Mauretania Sitifensis. In those years, Igilgili grew to nearly 6,000 inhabitants and was very rich, with commerce to Italy and Iberia.

The site is on a low peninsula and a small coastal plain enclosed by a ring of hills, about half-way between Bône and Algiers. The Roman colony, founded by Augustus (Plin. HN 5.21), is mentioned by Ptolemy (4.2.2), in the Antonine Itinerary, the Peutinger Table, and in the Ravenna Geographer. It was a fairly important port until the Byzantine period. Six roads went out from it...The remains of town walls (which have now disappeared) belonged to the Roman period. An aqueduct comes from the S. To the SE of the knoll of St. Ferdinand were public baths. They have produced Dionysiac and ornamental mosaics, now at the Skikda Museum (formerly Philippeville), and sculptures (a satyr's head at the Algiers Museum). Other artifacts include statuettes, lamps, and votive stelae (at the Skikda Museum and the Louvre). M. Leglay

Igilgili population and its surroundings became massively Christian in the fourth century, with the formalization of this religion under Emperor Constantine, although the first conversions date back to two centuries earlier. When emperor Valentinian I sent his magister militum Theodosius (father of Theodosius I) to attack Firmus, he landed in Igilgili in 374 AD; there Firmus tried to find a compromise with him, but Theodosius refused peace to Firmus, who had proclaimed himself emperor. With the support of the indigenous local African tribes, Firmus obliged Theodosius to a bloody and hopeless campaign in which Igilgili region was devastated for a couple of years. In the end, however, Firmus was betrayed by one of his supporters, and chose suicide over capture.

The Roman city remained rich until the attack and partial destruction by the Vandals in 429 AD. Subsequently, the city was taken in 533 AD by the Byzantine (Eastern Roman Empire) and their Romano-African supporters (Romanized Berber dwellers) from the Vandals. Catholicism and the Roman way of life were restored under the Byzantines, while the remaining Vandals took refuge in the surrounding mountains (of actual "Little Kabylie").

At the time of arrival of the Umayyads and Islam in the region in the late seventh century, Byzantine officials with troops and some Roman Catholic and Latinized Berbers lived in the city of Igilgili. While nearby of the city the camps were populated by peasants Berber "Kutama" (called Ucutamani by the Byzantines), not fully Christians.

Around 650 AD the first riders of Islam appeared. Queen Kahina was defeated in 698 AD by the Muslim troops of Hassan Ibn Numan and the city of Igilgili was renamed "Jijel". It was incorporated into the Umayyad empire. The population of the region, which was then mainly Christian, converted to Islam, and by the end of the eighth century it had already become overwhelmingly Muslim. The Arabic language there diffused slowly and gradually, replacing Latin in Jijel city only in the early eighth century.

== See also ==
- Mauretania Caesariensis
- Caesarea
- Auzia
- Cirta
- Chullu
- Milevum
