= Mauretania Caesariensis =

Roman province in northwest Africa

Provincia Mauretania Caesariensis
- Province of the Roman Empire
- 42 AD–Late 7th century
- The province of Mauretania Caesariensis within the Roman Empire, c. 125 AD
- Capital: Caesarea
- Historical era: Classical antiquity, Late Antiquity
  - Incorporated into the Roman Empire as a full province: 42 AD
  - Vandal Conquest: 430s AD
  - Byzantine partial reconquest by Vandalic War: 534 AD
  - Muslim conquest: Late 7th century
Preceded by	Succeeded by
Mauretania; Vandal Kingdom	Vandal Kingdom; Umayyad Caliphate
- Today part of: Algeria

Mauretania Caesariensis (Latin for "Caesarean Mauretania") was a Roman province located in present-day Algeria. The full name refers to its capital Caesarea Mauretaniae (modern Cherchell).

The province had been part of the Kingdom of Mauretania and named for the Mauri people who lived there. Formerly an independent kingdom, and later a client state of Rome, it was annexed into the Empire formally during the reign of Claudius and divided into two provinces about 42 AD. A third province, named Mauretania Sitifensis, was later split off from the eastern portion during the reign of Diocletian in 293 AD. During and after the fall of the Western Roman Empire in the 5th century, most of the hinterland area was lost, first to the Vandal Kingdom and later to the Mauro-Roman Kingdom, with Roman administration limited to the capital of Caesarea. The land was reconquered by Rome during the reign of Justinian. This province was a part of Praetorian prefecture of Africa, later Exarchate of Africa. The Muslim conquest of the Maghreb brought an end to Roman rule in Mauretania, permanently this time, which became ruled by the Umayyad Caliphate as part of Medieval Muslim Algeria.

== History ==
The Roman Empire in the time of Hadrian (ruled 117–138), showing the imperial province of Mauretania Caesariensis (roughly modern Algeria, in the Maghreb)

In the middle of the 1st century, Roman emperor Claudius divided the westernmost Roman province in Africa, named Mauretania ('land of the Mauri', hence the word Moors), into Mauretania Caesariensis (named after its capital, Caesarea in Mauretania, one of many cities named Caesarea after the imperial cognomen that had become a title) and Mauretania Tingitana.

Mauretania Caesariensis included eight colonies founded by the Emperor Augustus: Cartennae, Gunugus, Igilgili, Rusguniae, Rusazus, Saldae, Zuccabar, Tubusuctu; two by the Emperor Claudius: Caesarea in Mauretania, formerly the capital of Juba II, who gave it this name in honour of his patron Augustus, and Oppidum Novum; one by the Emperor Nerva: Setifis; and in later times, Arsenaria, Bida, Siga, Aquae Calidae, Quiza Xenitana, Rusucurru, Auzia, Gilva, Icosium and Tipasa in all 21 well-known colonies, besides several municipia and oppida Latina.

Under Diocletian's Tetrarchy reform, the easternmost part was broken off from Mauretania Caesariensis as a separate small province, Mauretania Sitifensis, called after its inland capital Setifis (now Sétif) with a significant port at Saldae (presently Béjaïa).

At the time of Diocletian and Constantine the Great, both Sitifensis and Caesariensis were assigned to the administrative Diocese of Africa, under the Praetorian prefecture of Italy. Tingitana belonged to the Diocese of Hispania under the Praetorian prefecture of Gaul, so it was an enclave separate from the European territory of the Diocese and Prefecture it belonged to.

After the fall of the Western Roman Empire, a Germanic Vandal Kingdom was founded, but the remaining Eastern Empire (now known to historians as the Byzantine Empire) recaptured the area around 533. Most of Mauretania Caesariensis remained under the control of local Moorish rulers such as Mastigas, and it was not until the 560s and 570s that Byzantine control was established inland.

During the reign of Maurice, the empire was reorganized, and a number of Exarchates were founded, among them the Exarchate of Africa, which included Mauretania, among other territories. Mauretania Sitifensis was re-merged back into this province and granted the name "Mauretania Prima".

The Muslim conquest of the Maghreb for the caliphate under the Umayyad dynasty meant the end of the Byzantine Exarchate of Africa and Late Antique Roman culture there, and Mauretania Caesariensis became part of the westernmost Islamic province called Maghreb.

== Economy ==
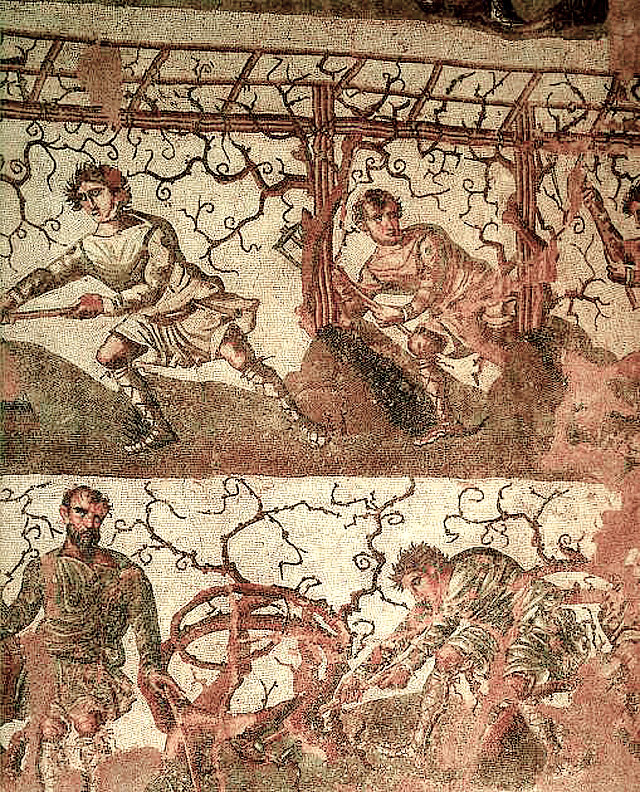
Mosaic of vineyard workers from Caesarea

The principal exports from Caesariensis were valuable woods; and the Amazigh or Mauri were highly regarded by the Romans as soldiers, especially light cavalry. They produced the emperor Macrinus.

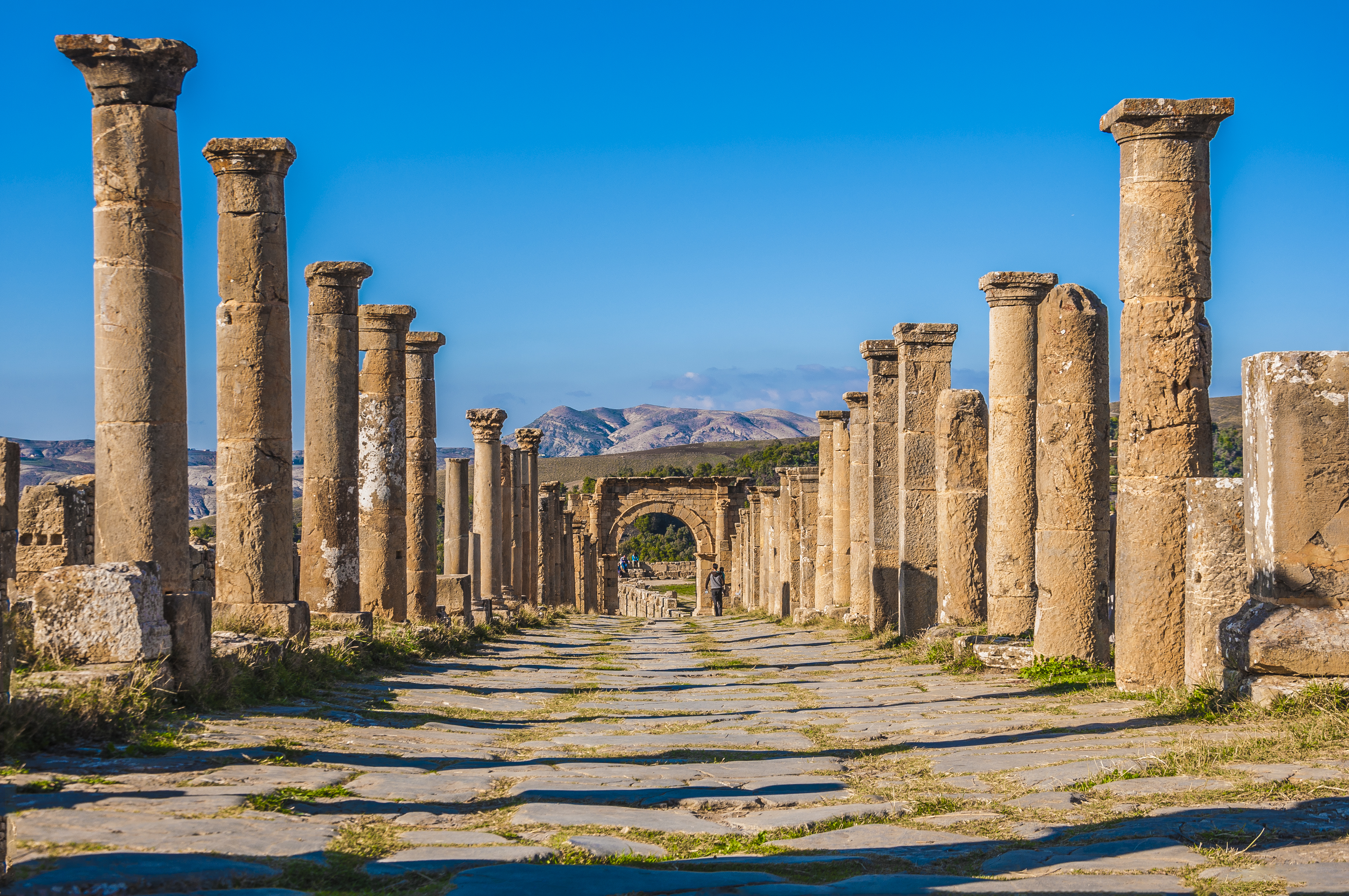
Ruins of the Roman town of Cuicul in Djemila

== Religion ==
Caesarea was a major centre of Judaism before 330, and Sitifis was one of the centres of the soldier cult of Mithraic mysteries. Christianity spread throughout in the 4th and 5th centuries.

Among the ruling class, Trinitarian Christianity was replaced by Arianism under the Germanic kingdom of the Vandals, which was established in 430, when the Vandals crossed the Strait of Gibraltar.

=== Episcopal sees ===
Ancient episcopal sees of Mauretania Caesariensis listed in the Annuario Pontificio as titular sees:

- Ala Miliaria (Beniane)
- Albulae
- Altava (Ouled Mimoun, Hadjar-Er-Roum)
- Amaura (Amourah)
- Ambia (near Hammam-Bou-Hanifia)
- Aquae in Mauretania (Hammam Righa District)
- Aquae Sirenses (ruins at Hammam-Bou-Hanifia)
- Arena (Bou-Saada?)
- Arsennaria (Bou-Râs?)
- Auzia (Aumale, Sour-Khazlam)
- Bacanaria
- Baliana (L'Hillil?)
- Bapara (near the promontory of Ksila?)
- Benepota
- Bida (ruins of Djemâa-Sahridj?)
- Caesarea in Mauretania (now Cherchell), the Metropolitan Archbishopric
- Caltadria
- Capra
- Caput Cilla (ruins of El-Gouéa?)
- Cartennae
- Castellum Ripae (ruins of Hadjar-Ouaghef?)
- Castellum Tatroportus
- Castellum Tingitii (Al Asnam)
- Castellum Iabar
- Castellum Medianum
- Castellum Minus (Coléa, near Algiers)
- Castra Nova (Mohammadia)
- Castra Severiana (Lalla Marnia? Chanzy, Sidi-Ali-Ben-Joub?)
- Catabum Castra (Saint-Aimé, Djidioua?)
- Catrum
- Catula (Oued Damous?)
- Cenae (Kenais Islands)
- Cissi (Djinet)
- Columnata (Khemisti)
- Corniculana
- Elephantaria in Mauretania (ruins at (El) Harrach)
- Fallaba (Djelfa?)
- Fidoloma
- Flenucleta
- Floriana, Mauritania (Letourneux, Derrag?)
- Flumenzer (Bou Medfa)
- Fronta
- Giru Mons (ruins of Yerroum?)
- Gratianopolis
- Gunugus (Sidi-Brahim)
- Gypsaria (Honeïn)
- Ida in Mauretania
- Igilgilli (in the valley of Bou-Sellam?)
- Iomnium (port at Tzigiri)
- Ita
- Iunca in Mauretania
- Lamdia (Médéa)
- Lari Castellum (Imilaën)
- Maiuca
- Malliana (Khemis Miliana)
- Manaccenser (in the region of Cherchell)
- Masuccaba
- Maturba
- Maura (Douelt-Zerga?)
- Mauriana
- Maxita (in the region of Al-Asnam?)
- Media
- Mina (ruins near Rezilane)
- Muteci (near Aïn-El-Anab?)
- Nabala
- Nasbinca
- Noba
- Novica (ruins of Aïn-Nouïssy?)
- Numida (in the territory of Amoura, cfr supra Amaura)
- Obbi, Mauretania
- Obori (Sidi Fredj)
- Oppidum Novum (Aïn Defla)
- Panatoria
- Pomaria (Tlemcen)
- Rapidum (Masqueray, Sour-Djouab)
- Regiae (Arbal)
- Reperi
- Rusada (Azeffoun)
- Rusguniae (Tamentfoust)
- Rusubbicari (Mers El Hadjadj)
- Rusubisir (in the territory of Tiza)
- Rusuccuru
- Satafi
- Sereddeli
- Serta
- Sesta
- Sfasferia
- Siccesi (ruins of Takembrit)
- Sinnada in Mauretania (ruins of Kenada?)
- Sita (in the west of the province)
- Subbar
- Sufar
- Sufasar (Amourah)
- Summula
- Tabaicara
- Tabla (Tablat?, Tablast?)
- Taborenta (ruins near Saida?)
- Tabunia
- Tamada (Aïn-Tamda near Masqueray?)
- Tamazuca (ruins of Grimidi?)
- Tanaramusa (Mousaïaville, El-Hadjeab? Berrouaghia?)
- Tasaccora (Sigi)
- Tatilti (Souk El Khemis)
- Tigamibena
- Tigava (El-Kherba)
- Tigisis (between Dellys and Taourga)
- Timici (Timsionin?)
- Timidana
- Tingaria (Tiaret?)
- Tipasa in Mauretania
- Tubia (ruins of Henchir-Toubia?)
- Tubunae in Mauretania
- Turris in Mauretania
- Tuscamia
- Ubaba
- Usinaza (Seneg)
- Vagal, Mauritania (near the ruins of Sidi-Ben-Thiour)
- Vanariona (ruins of Ksar-Tyr?)
- Vannida
- Vardimissa (near Medjana)
- Villa Nova, Mauritania
- Vissalsa (on the Oued-Melah river?)
- Voncaria (ruins of Boghar?)
- Voncariana (near the ruins of Boghasi?)
- Vulturia (ruins at the Falco promontory?)
- Zucchabar

== See also ==
- Notitia Dignitatum
