= Souagui =

Souagui السواقي
- Commune and town
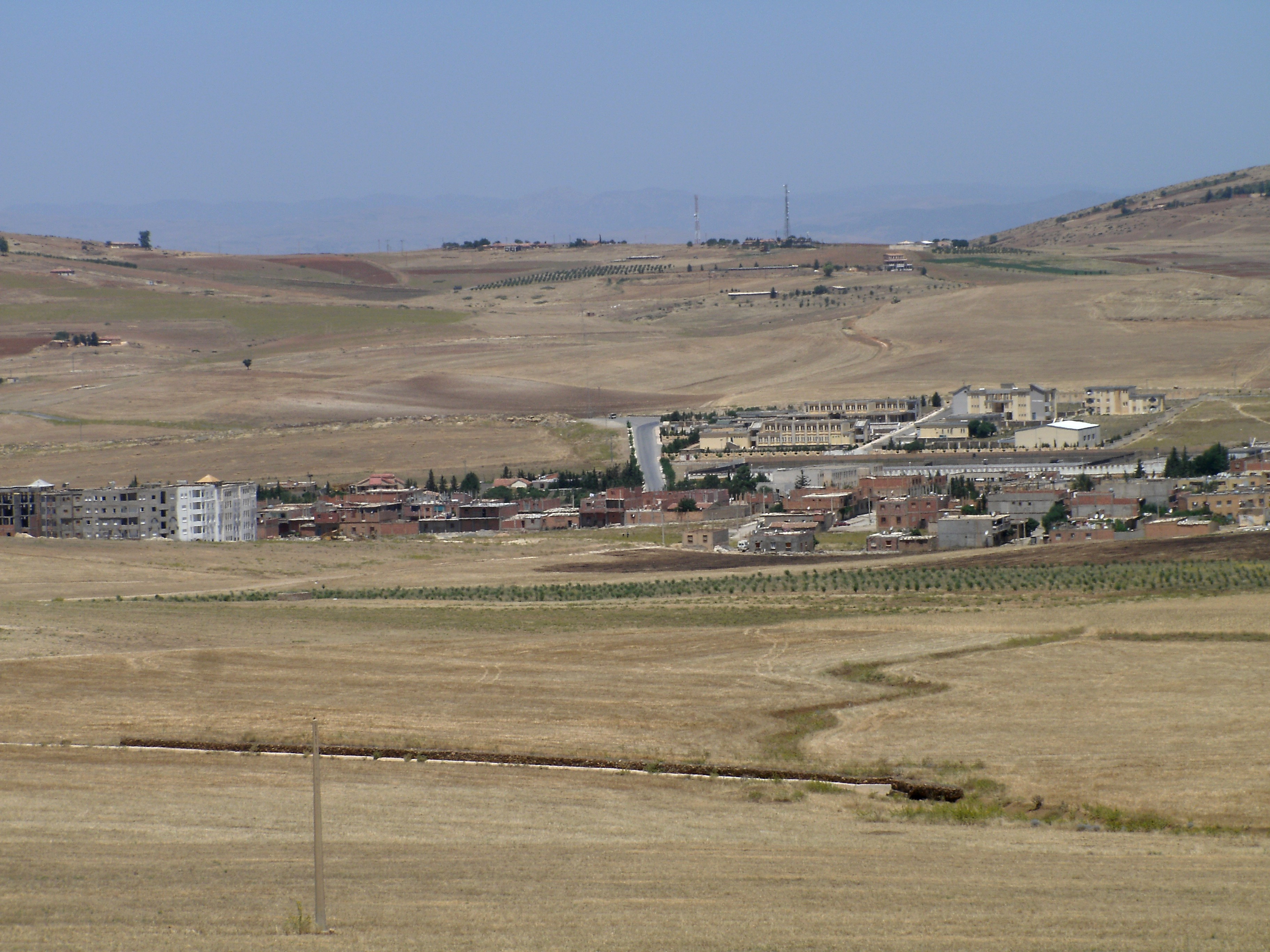
- Nickname: Tamada

- Location within Algeria
- Coordinates: 36°7′0″N 3°14′0″E
- Country: Algeria
- Province: Médéa Province

Area
  - Total: 52.7 sq mi (136.6 km^{2})

Population (2008)
  - Total: 15,536
- Time zone: UTC+1 (CET)
- Postal Code: 26033

Souagui is a town and commune in Médéa Province, Algeria, with a population of 19,059 according to the 1998 census.

== History ==
=== The monastery of Aïn-Tamda ===
The ruins of the church of Aïn-Tamda, located fifteen kilometres west of Djouab (Masqueray under French colonisation, Rapidum in antiquity) and three kilometres north of the road from Sour-el-Ghozlane to Berrouaghia, are encountered in the bare plain near a beautiful spring that soon loses itself in a marsh, hence their name. During their exploration in the late 19th and early 20th centuries, the area around the church was uninhabited, and no traces of ancient dwellings have been found in the immediate vicinity. However, the area was by no means a desert: in ancient times, large farmsteads were present, the ruins of which would still have been visible in the hollow of a valley near the church at the time of the excavation.

Seston clearly observed the apse completely clear of the nave; crude column bases and large ashlars suggested the existence of a double colonnade and a porch; "to the left, along the porch, could be seen the remains of several rooms". Its 1927 excavations revealed a church oriented south-south-east to north-north-west, with a total length of 25 metres, with an apse projecting outwards by 5m50. Twelve columns in local blue limestone, with their capitals, lay on the floor of the main nave; all were found, along with three of the four half-columns that reduced the width of the nave at its two ends, as well as the keystones of the triumphal arch. However, no trace of the roof tiles was found during the excavations, suggesting that the church, which had long been abandoned and looted, had not been reused for other purposes. The pavement of the three naves has not survived; there were never any mosaics, only brick tiles. A staircase of three perfectly jointed slabs led up to the choir. Although paved with thin slabs of carefully polished white limestone, the flooring of the chancel was only found as debris along the wall, due to the looting of the tombs that cluttered the floor of this part of the church.

The altar, probably located at the front of the chancel in the nave, had long since disappeared, with only its rough masonry foundations having been found. However, it would be possible to reconstruct the triumphal arch using the keystones found on the floor. The columns of the nave supported a wall that was more than two metres high, probably pierced by windows that illuminated the church. Near the porch, on the left as you enter the church, a small polished stone basin was discovered, devoid of any inscription or decoration on the outside. This humble stoup rested on the ground, unlike other similar basins discovered in Africa, which were placed on a stone column.

The decoration of the church seemed very modest, as some of the stones had already been reused elsewhere. For example, the base of one column bore a funerary inscription that Gsell published; a milliary column and a stele, which may have been dedicated by the decurions of Rapidum to Severus Alexander, had been incorporated into the church walls. Although the keystones of the triumphal arch and the keystone had been carefully carved, no attempt had been made to decorate them with motifs such as wreaths or vine branches, unlike what is often found in other contemporary churches. The capitals bore volutes in a crude Ionic style, similar to those seen at Tipasa, in part of the basilica of Sainte-Salsa dating from the first half of the 6th century. This comparison would provide a chronological landmark that is all the more important as the monument is devoid of any sculpture, mosaic or inscription.

An interesting detail for dating the monument is a fork with three equal prongs, about fifteen cm high, carved deep into the stone on two columns in the nave. This could be the equivalent of a graffito, testifying to the Catholic faith of the faithful attending the church. In Africa, where the controversy over the Trinity caused much unrest, these three equal branches of the fork were intended to express, in the face of Arianism, the Catholic affirmation of the unity of substance and equality of power of the three divine persons. The church at Aïn-Tamda therefore seems to have been built by Catholics affirming their Nicene faith in the face of the Arians.

However, despite these indications, little is known about the Christian origins of the region and it is difficult to state with certainty that the church at Aïn-Tamda dates from the end of the 5th century or the beginning of the 6th century. The Vandals, who had obtained the cession of certain regions in 442, did not fully control the Mauritania until 474, when the Arians persecuted the Catholics. The Catholic church at Aïn-Tamda could therefore predate 474 or post-date 533, when Catholicism was restored under the reign of Belisarius and the Byzantines. However, in the absence of more precise data on the region's Christian origins, it is difficult to establish an exact date.

Although the church, as discovered during the excavations, is in ruins, stripped of all decoration, without an altar or reliquary, its interest goes beyond these aspects. It is part of a group of buildings hitherto little known in North Africa, namely a monastery. Excavations uncovered foundations that made it possible to reconstruct the complete layout of the building, which measured 58m25 in length and was 29 metres wide to the east, narrowing to 25m30 along the church. The only entrance to the monastery was in the east wall, opening onto a corridor leading to a large courtyard, surrounded by large rooms of varying lengths but all 4 metres wide on the short sides of the rectangle and 4m40 on the other two. The state of the ruins makes it impossible to determine the function of each of these large rooms. No trace of an interior colonnade, which would have surrounded the courtyard, has been found. Only the walls on the north side of the courtyard, which were better preserved, still had the thresholds and doorframes. The monastery had only one entrance, in the middle of a façade, and was surrounded by a thick wall, enclosing the church and the convent in a single enclosure. All the interior walls were 0m70 wide at the base. The Aïn-Tamda convent did not evolve from, or alongside, an older basilica, but was built at the same time, forming a coherent whole from the outset. It was therefore the first group of religious buildings in North Africa to be built together to form a monastery.
