= Diocese of Tamada =

Ancient Roman town

Mauretania Caesariensis (125 AD)

Tamada was an ancient Roman–Berber civitas in the province of Mauretania Caesariensis. The town lasted through the Byzantine Empire, Vandal Kingdom and Roman Empire into late antiquity, until at least the Muslim conquest of the Maghreb in the 7th century.

The town was also the seat of an ancient Catholic Church diocese. The bishopric survives today as a titular see of the Roman Catholic Church.

== Location ==
The stone ruins of four Tamda edifices are located around four kilometers east of the city of Souagui. Excavations in 1927 made it possible to find on the site of Ain Tamda the ruins of a Christian monastery and a church, which date from the 4th century. Aïn-Tamda is the site of the Roman town of Tamada.

== Bishopric ==
The ancient town of Tamada was the cathedra of a Roman Catholic Church episcopal see of Mauretania Caesariensis.

The only known Catholic bishop of the diocese was Romano, who took part in the synod assembled in Carthage in 484 by the Arian King, Huneric of the Vandal Kingdom, after which Romano was exiled.

A Donatist, bishop Tanudaidensis, has been attributed by Morcelli to Tamada, but according to Mesnage, he was from the diocese of Tanudaia.

Today Tamada survives as a titular bishopric and the current archbishop, personal title, is Francis Leo (NOT: Aldo Giordano, apostolic nuncio in Venezuela. He replaced Santos Abril y Castelló in 2012.

== See also ==
- Mauretania Caesariensis
