= Sinnada =

Ancient city in North Africa

Sinnada was an ancient city in Mauretania Caesariensis.

Its location is presumed near Kenada, in modern Algeria.

== Ecclesiastical history ==
Sinnada was a suffragan bishopric of the metropolitan see of Caesarea Mauretaniae, but later faded.

=== Titular see ===
The diocese was nominally restored in 1933 as a Latin Catholic titular bishopric.

It has had three incumbents of the lowest (episcopal) rank and one of the intermediary (archiepiscopal) rank.
