= Fronta =

The Diocese of Fronta (Latin: Dioecesis Frontensis) is a suppressed and titular see of the Roman Catholic Church.

During the Roman Empire the Diocese of Fronta, was of the Roman province of Mauretania Caesariensis. The location of the seat of the diocese remains unknown but has been tentatively identified with Fortassa, Uzès-le-Duc in modern Algeria. The only known bishop of this diocese from antiquity is Donato, who took part in the synod assembled in Carthage in 484 by the Vandal King Huneric, after which the bishop was exiled.

Today Fronta survives as a titular bishopric and the current bishop is Josef Grünwald, of Augsburg.
