= Lari Castellum =

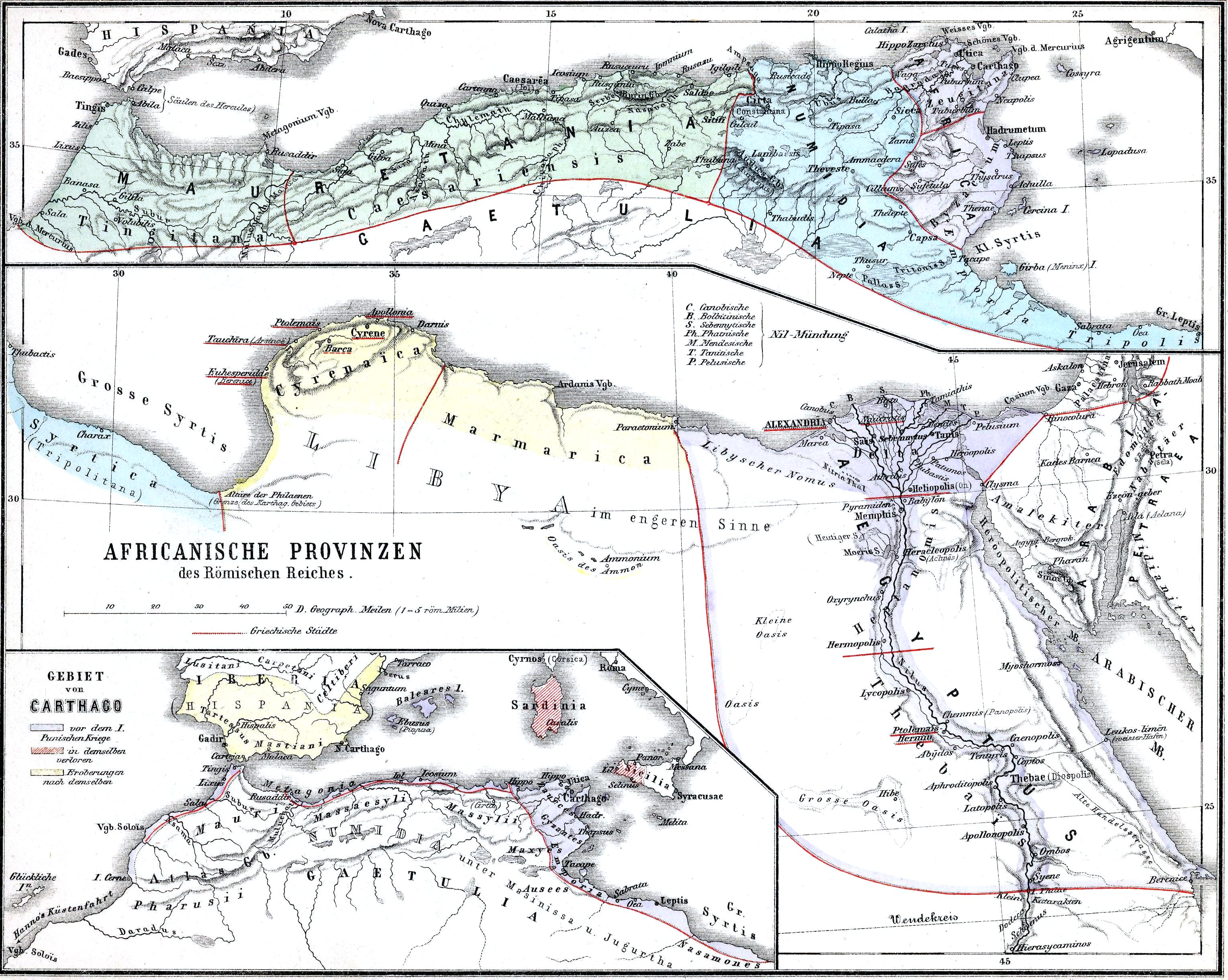
Roman North Africa

The Diocese of Lari Castellum (Dioecesis Laritana) is a suppressed and titular see of the Catholic Church. province of Mauritania Caesariensis. Lari Castle is centered on Imilaën in modern Algeria and the current titular bishop is Ramiro Díaz Sánchez, OMI, former vicar apostolic of Machiques.

== Known bishops ==
- Restitutus (mentioned in 411 ) (a Donatist bishop)
- Carlos Riu Anglés (September 10, 1964 – November 28, 1971)
- Michele Giordano, Archbishop of Matera (December 23, 1971 – June 12, 1974)
- Alfredo José Rodríguez Figueroa † (24 July 1974 – 12 March 1987)
- Rodolfo Francisco Bobadilla Mata, CM (May 15, 1987 – September 28, 1996)
- Ramiro Díaz Sánchez, OMI, from 24 January 1997

== See also ==
- List of Catholic titular sees
