= Sereddeli =

Roman Empire - Mauretania Caesariensis (125 AD)

Sereddeli was an ancient Roman town of the Roman province of Mauretania Caesariensis, in North Africa. Sereddeli flourished through the Vandal Kingdom and Roman Empire into late antiquity. It survived until at least the Muslim conquest of the Maghreb.

== Bishopric ==
Sereddeli was also the seat of an ancient diocese, called in Latin: Dioecesis Sereddelitana, which survives today as a suppressed and titular see of the Roman Catholic Church.

The only known bishop of this diocese from antiquity is Rogato, who took part in the synod assembled in Carthage in 484 by the Vandal king Huneric, after which Rogato was exiled. Today Sereddeli survives as a titular bishopric and the current bishop is Hector López Alvarado, auxiliary bishop of Guadalajara, México.
