= Panatoria =

Ancient city from the Roman Empire

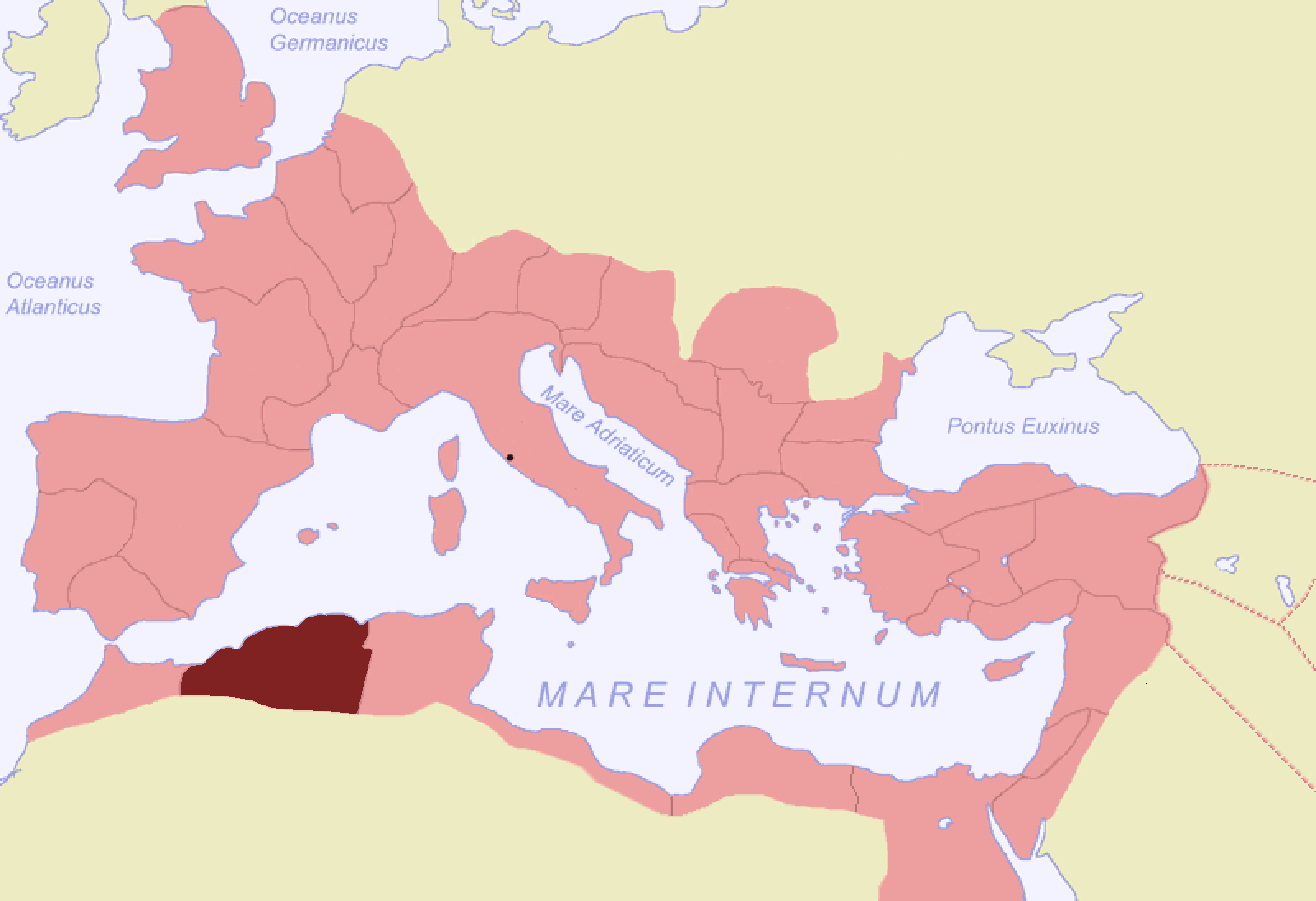
Mauretania Caesariensis

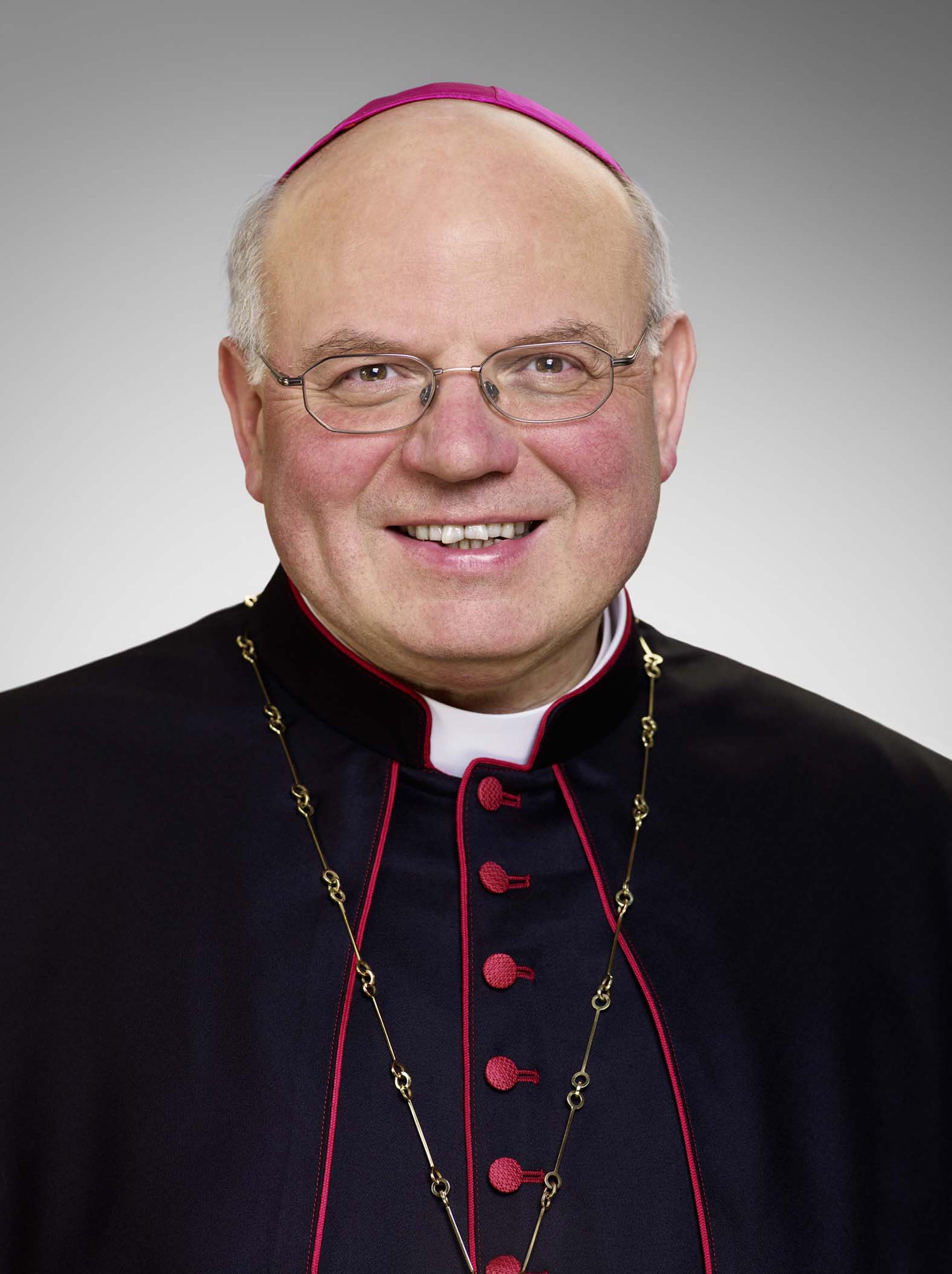
Weihbischof Hubert Berenbrinker, bishop of Panatoria

Panatoria was an ancient city in the Roman province of Mauretania Caesariensis, during the Roman Empire. An exact location of the city is not known but it was in what is today the north of Algeria.

The town was the seat of an ancient bishopric through the Byzantine Empire, Vandal Kingdom and Roman Empire. The only known bishop of this African diocese is Donato, who took part in the synod assembled in Carthage in 484 by the Vandal King Huneric, after which Donato was sent into exile.
