= Ubaba =

Ancient Algerian ecclesiastical district

Mauretania Caesariensis.

Ubaba, in today's Algeria, is an ancient episcopal seat of the ecclesiastical province of Mauretania Caesariensis.

The seat of the diocese is currently lost to history. The only known bishop of this diocese is Ingenuo, who took part in the synod assembled in Carthage in 484 by the Arian King Huneric the Vandal, after which Ingenuo was exiled. Today Ubaba survives as a titular bishopric and currently the venue is vacant.
