= Flenucleta =

Ancient city & Catholic titular see in Algeria

Roman Empire - Mauretania Caesariensis (125 AD)

Flenucleta was an ancient Berber, Roman and Byzantine civitas located in the Mediterranean hinterland of what was then the province of Mauretania Caesariensis. It was situated in present-day northern Algeria. The exact location of the city is unknown.

Flenucleta was also the seat of the Catholic Church diocese of Flenucleta which goes back to a Roman era bishopric in the ancient town of the same name. Although the diocese ceased to effectively function with the Muslim conquest of the Maghreb, the diocese has been re-established in name at least as a titular see of the Roman Catholic Church.

== Known bishops ==
- Felice (fl.484)
- Julien Le Couëdic Emeritus Bishop of Troyes (France) 21 February 1967 – 10 December 1970
- Antoine Mayala ma Mpangu Coadjutor bishop of Kisantu (Zaïre) August 30, 1971 – 27 April 1973
- Nicholas Mang Thang, Auxiliary bishop in Mandalay (Burma) 21 June 1988 – 21 November 1992
- João Braz de Aviz Auxiliary Bishop of Vitória (Brazil) 6 April 1994 – 12 August 1998
- Hélio Adelar Rubert Auxiliary Bishop of Vitória (Brazil) 4 August 1999 – 24 March 2004
- Joseph Walter Estabrook Auxiliary Bishop of the US Military Directorate (United States) 7 May 2004 – 4 February 2012
- Nil Jurij Luschtschak Auxiliary bishop in Mukacheve (Ukraine) November 19, 2012
