= Tasaccora =

Ancient Roman City in North Africa

Roman Empire - Mauretania Caesariensis (125 AD)

Tasaccora, identifiable with the town of Sig in modern Algeria, was an ancient Roman town of the Roman province of Mauretania Caesariensis.

A bishop of this town Pequary, is known to have taken part in the synod assembled in Carthage in 484 by King Huneric of the Vandal Kingdom. Shortly after the synod Pequary was exiled (possibly) to Vandal-controlled Sicily. The current bishop of Tasaccora is Adam John Parker, the Catholic auxiliary bishop of Baltimore.
