= Castellum Minus =

Roman Empire - Mauretania Caesariensis (125 AD)

Castellum Minus was an ancient city located in the Roman province of Mauretania Caesariensis in today's northern Algeria. The ancient city is identified with ruins near Coléa, Algeria, (at 35.3877778° latitude and 0.1416667° longitude).

The ancient town was also the seat of a Christian bishopric. Which remains today a titular see in the Roman Catholic Church.
