= Tabaicara =

Roman-Berber city in north Africa

Mauretania Caesariensis (125 AD).

Tabaicara was a Roman-Berber civitas and bishopric in Mauretania Caesariensis. It is now a Latin Catholic titular see.

== History ==
Tabaicara was among the cities of sufficient importance in the Roman–Berber province of Mauretania Caesariensis, in the papal sway, to become a suffragan diocese. It was located in modern Algeria, but faded so completely (like most), plausibly at the late 7th century of Islam, that the location of the cathedra is still unknown.

Three bishops of this diocese are documented from antiquity.

- At the Council of Carthage (411) were the Catholic Victor and his rival Donatist schismatic counterpart, Marcianus.
- Bishop Crispin took part in the Council of Carthage (484) called by king Huneric of the Vandal Kingdom, after which Crispin was exiled like most Catholic, unlike their Donatist heretical counterparts.

== Titular see ==
The diocese was nominally restored in 1933 as Latin titular bishopric of Tabaicara (Latin = Curiate Italian) / Tabaicaren(sis) (Latin adjective).

It has had the following incumbents, so far of the fitting Episcopal (lowest) rank:

- James Edward Kearney (1966.10.21 – resigned 1971.01.18) on emeritate, died 1977; previously Bishop of Salt Lake (USA) (1932.07.01 – 1937.07.31), Bishop of Rochester (USA) (1937.07.31 – 1966.10.21)
- Valerians Zondaks (1972.10.28 – death 1986.09.27), first as Auxiliary Bishop of Archdiocese of Riga (Latvia) (1972.10.28 – 1986.09.27), then as Auxiliary Bishop of Diocese of Liepāja (Latvia) (1972.10.28 – 1986.09.27)
- Juozas Žemaitis, Marian Fathers (M.I.C.) (1989.03.10 – 1991.12.24) as Apostolic Administrator of Diocese of Vilkaviškis (Lithuania) (1989.03.10 – 1991.12.24); later succeeded as Bishop of Vilkaviškis (1991.12.24 – 2002.01.05)
- Leonardo Mario Bernacchi, Friars Minor (O.F.M.) (Italian) (1993.11.17 – death 2012.04.10), first as 'last' Apostolic Vicar of Cuevo (Bolivia) (1993.11.17 – 2003.03.29), then (see) restyled 'first' Apostolic Vicar of Camiri (Bolivia) (2003.03.29 – retired 2009.07.15)

BIOS TO ELABORATE

- The current titular bishop is Iosif Staneuski. bishop of Hrodna.

== See also ==
- List of Catholic dioceses in Algeria

== Sources and external links ==
- GCatholic

Bibliography

- Pius Bonifacius Gams, Series episcoporum Ecclesiae Catholicae, Leipzig 1931, p. 468
- Stefano Antonio Morcelli, Africa christiana, Volume I, Brescia 1816, p. 291
