= Siccesi =

Titular see of Roman Catholic Church

The diocese of Siccesi (Latin: Dioecesis siccessitana) is a suppressed and titular see of the Roman Catholic Church.

== History ==
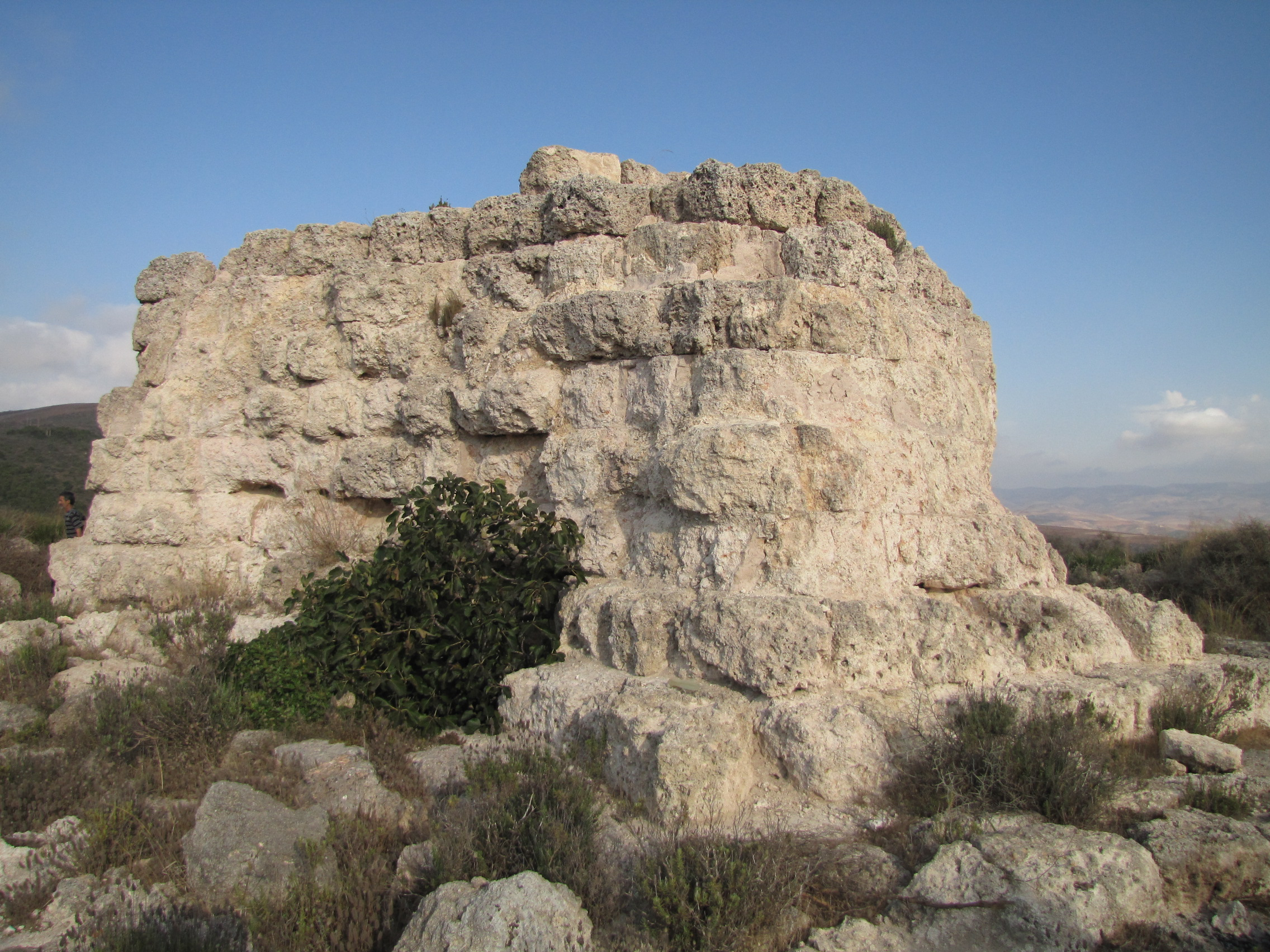
File:Tombeau de Syphax.

Sicchi, is an ancient bishopric of the Roman province of Mauretania Caesariensis. Siccesi today survives as a titular bishopric. The current bishop is Karel Herbst former Auxiliary Bishop of Prague.

== Diocese seat ==
The seat of the bishopric was the ancient city of Siga which is identifiable with the ruins of Takembrit on the Mediterranean coast in modern Algeria. Siga was a major port city in the ancient Kingdom of Numidia, and during the Second Punic War, the kings of Siga sided with Rome. The city got some importance inside the Roman Africa, especially with African emperors Septimius Severus and Caracalla. With the Arab conquest, during the second half of the seventh century, disappeared all references to Siga in documented history.

== Known bishops ==
- At the Conference of Carthage of 411 between Catholic baptists and Donatist of Roman Africa, the town was represented by the Donatist Martino, without a Catholic adversary.
- Empatia participated in the synod assembled in Carthage in 484 by the Vandal King Huneric, after which Empatia was exiled.
- William Patrick O'Connor Bishop of Madison, Wisconsin, United States (18 Feb 1967 Appointed – 31 Dec 1970 Resigned)
- James Stephen Sullivan (25 Jul 1972 Appointed – 29 Mar 1985 Appointed, Bishop of Fargo, North Dakota)
- Enrique San Pedro (1 Apr 1986 Appointed – 13 Aug 1991 Appointed, Coadjutor Bishop of Brownsville, Texas)
- Karel Herbst (19 Feb 2002 Appointed - )
