= Rusubisir =

Ancient Roman town

Rusubisir was an ancient Roman town of the Roman province of Mauretania Caesariensis. An exact location of the town is not currently known but it presumed to be in the territory around Tiza, Algeria.

Rusubisir was also the seat of an ancient bishopric which survives today as a titular see of the Roman Catholic Church. The current bishop is Mons. Juan Alberto Ayala.
