= Rusazus =

Phoenician, Carthaginian, and Roman town

- Location within Algeria
- 36°54′0″N 4°25′0″E
- Location: Algeria

Rusazus was a Phoenician, Carthaginian, and Roman town located near Cape Corbelin, Algeria. Its ruins are near the town of Azeffoun.

== Name ==
ršz (Phoenician: 𐤓𐤔𐤆) was the Phoenician and Punic name of Cape Corbelin and meant "Cape of the Strong One" or "Cape of the Fort". It was hellenized as Rhousazoûs (Ancient Greek: Ῥουσαζοῦς) and Latinized variously as Rusazus, Rusazu, Rusazis, Ruseius, and Rusadum.

As to which "Strong One" might have been meant, Lipiński offers that Azeffoun's name itself might be a Berber memory of a Punic toponym honoring Baal Zephon, who was reckoned a patron of maritime trade. He allows, though, that pending the discovery of such an inscription, mere assonance is also possible.

== History ==
Rusazus was established as a colony along the trade route between the Strait of Gibraltar and Phoenicia. It consisted of a small fortress south of Cape Corbelin. It eventually fell under Carthaginian control, probably during the 6th century BC.

Under the Romans, it was established as a Roman colony under Augustus. It was part of Mauretania Caesariensis after AD 44.

In late antiquity, it was part of the Vandal Kingdom prior to the Byzantine reconquest of Africa. It was overrun by the Umayyad Caliphate in the 7th century.

== Ruins ==
The site includes a necropolis and the ruins of baths, temples, and Roman-era embankments.

== Religion ==
The Roman town had a Christian bishopric (Latin: Dioecesis Rusaditana). It was revived in the 20th century as a Roman Catholic titular see.

=== List of bishops ===
- Idonio, who took part in Huneric's 484 Council of Carthage, after which he was expelled
- Agapito Augusto Fiorentini (1902–1941)
- Juan Tarsicio Senner (1942–1951)
- Joseph Howard Hodges (1952–1962)
- Pavol Mária Hnilica (1964–2006)
- Pascal Jean Marcel Wintzer (2007–2012)
- Georges Abou Khazen (2013–present)
