= Gilva, Numidia =

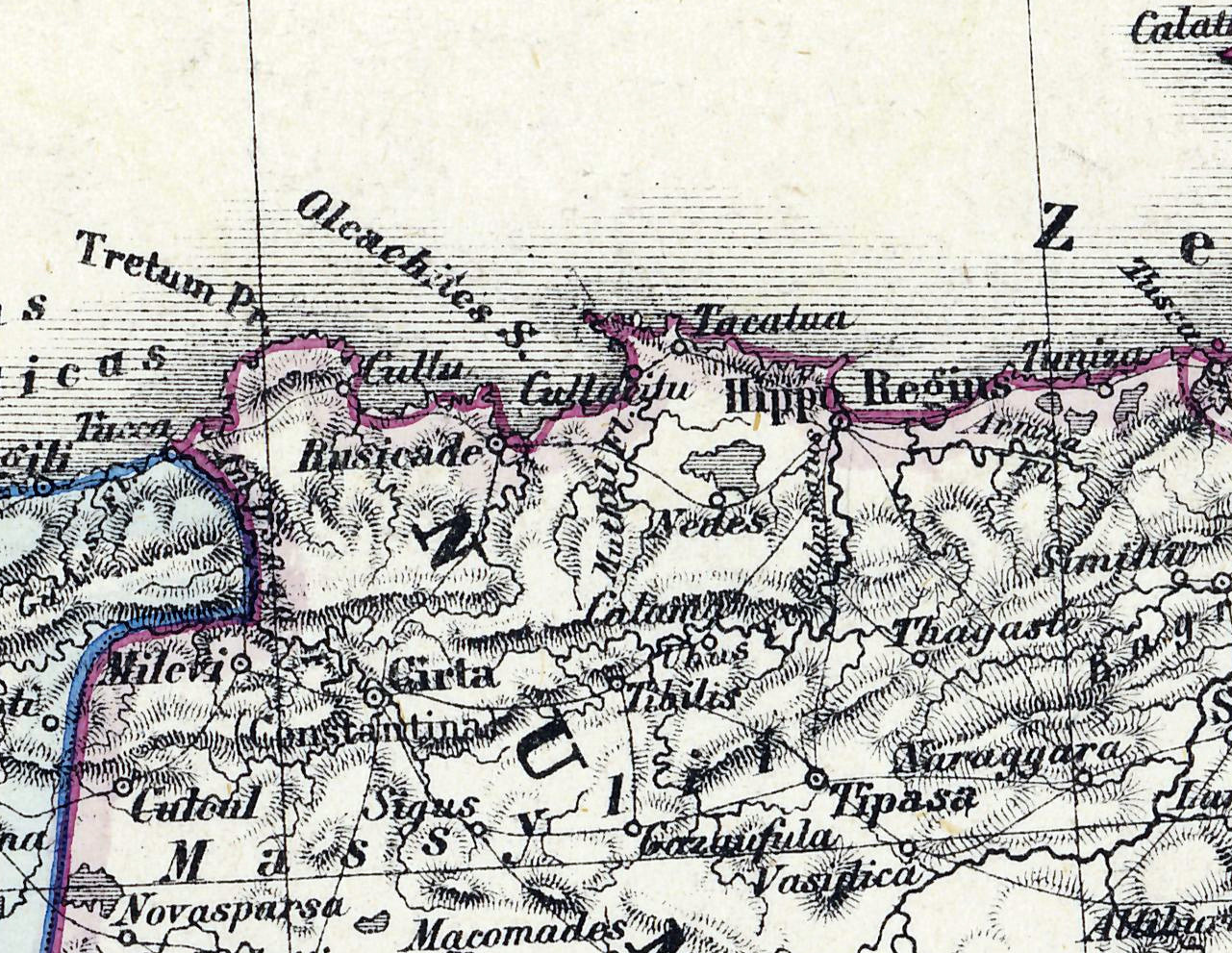
Gilva vicinity

Gilva was a Roman–Berber city in the province of Mauretania Caesariensis. It flourished during the Roman and Vandal empires. It was located to the south of Hippo Regius in present-day Algeria. The town existed from around 300 to 640AD.

Gilva is known through the writing of Augustine, over a dispute over an appointment of a bishop to the bishopric seat who was unwanted by the parishioners.

The town was a colonia and one of 170 bishoprics in Roman North Africa. In 422, there was a local Church synod.

Roman rule in the city ended in the 7th century with the spread of Islam.

== See also ==
- Catholic Church in Algeria
