= Usinaza =

Titular see of the Roman Catholic Church

Mauretania Caesariensis

The Diocese of Usinaza (Latin: Dioecesis Usinazensis) is a suppressed and titular see of the Roman Catholic Church, in the province of Mauretania Caesariensis.

The seat of the Usinaza bishopric has been tentatively identified with Seneg in today's Algeria, though this is not certain.

The only known ancient bishop of this diocese is Donaziano, who took part in the synod assembled in Carthage in 484 by the Arian King, Huneric of the Vandal Kingdom, after which the bishop was exiled.

Today Usinaza survives as a titular bishopric and the current bishop is Marie Pierre François Auguste Gaschy, apostolic vicar emeritus of Saint Pierre and Miquelon.

== See also ==
- Mauretania Caesariensis
