= Muteci =

Roman Empire - Mauretania Caesariensis (125 AD).

Muteci (in Latin: Mutecitana) was a Roman town of the Roman province of Mauretania Caesariensis. Its exact location is not known, but is estimated to have been near Aïn-El-Anab in modern Algeria, North Africa.

In 484 AD, the town's bishop, Quintasio, attended the synod assembled in Carthage by the Vandal King Huneric, after which Quintasio was exiled to Sicily. The current bishop of Muteci is Martin Ashe of Melbourne.
