= Diocese of Media =

Roman Catholic titular see

The Diocese of Media (Latin: Dioecesis Mediensis) is a suppressed and titular see of the Catholic Church. Media is listed as an ancient episcopal seat of the Roman province of Mauretania Caesariensis, in today's Algeria.

The bishopric was centered on a Roman town, now lost to history but that flourished in late antiquity but did not last long after the Muslim conquest of the Maghreb. Some conjecture that it was located at Médéa, though this town was known to be a different town called Lamdia.

The only known bishop of this diocese is Emilio, who took part in the synod assembled in Carthage in 484 by King Huneric the ruler of the Vandal Kingdom, after which Emilio was exiled to Vandal-controlled Sicily.

Today Media survives as a titular bishopric and the current bishop is Gabriel Narciso Escobar Ayala, apostolic vicar of Chaco Paraguayo.

== See also ==
- Mauretania Caesariensis
