= Castellum Ripae =

Castellum Ripae (literally "Riverbank Fortification") or Hadjar-Ouaghef is a locality and archeological site in Algeria, North Africa.

Castellum Ripae is north-east of Hennaya and 6 km (3.7 mi) from the confluence of the Sık'k'ak and the Isurs Rivers.

== History ==
During the Roman Empire Hadjar-Ouaghef was known as Castellum Ripae. It appears to have been a civitas in of the Roman province of Mauretania Caesariensis. Castellum Ripae has been identified with a set of ruins near Hadjar-Ouaghef.

Ancient Castellum Ripae was also the seat of a Christian bishopric during late antiquity. The only known bishop of this diocese is Cerealis, who took part in the synod assembled in Carthage in 484 by the Vandal King Huneric, after which Cerealis was exiled.

Although the see ceased to effectively function with the Muslim conquest of the Maghreb, today the bishopric (Latin: Dioecesis Castelloripensis) survives as a titular bishopric of the Roman Catholic Church, and the current bishop is Jose Pandarassery, of Kottayam.

At the beginning of French colonialism a fort was established here and it became a de facto entry into the Tafna Valley.
