= Martin Ashe =

Australian catholic bishop (born 1953)

The Most Reverend Martin Ashe
- Auxiliary Bishop of Melbourne; Titular Bishop of Muteci
- Archdiocese: Melbourne
- See: Muteci

Orders
- Ordination: 11 June 1978 by Tomás Ó Fiaich
- Consecration: 31 July 2021 by Peter Comensoli

Personal details
- Born: Martin Ashe; 27 September 1953 (age 73) Kinsale, County Cork, Ireland
- Denomination: Catholic Church
- Education: All Hallows College; Loyola University Chicago

Styles of Martin Ashe
- Reference style: The Most Reverend
- Spoken style: His Lordship or My Lord Bishop
- Religious style: Bishop

Martin Ashe (born 27 September 1953) is an Irish-Australian Catholic bishop. He has served as an Auxiliary Bishop of the Roman Catholic Archdiocese of Melbourne since 2021. Prior to this, he served in various Melbourne parishes, was pastoral director at Corpus Christi College Seminary, and also director of Ministry to Priests within the Archdiocese.

== Early life ==
Ashe was born in Kinsale, a historic port and fishing town in County Cork, Ireland and grew up in Killarney, in the neighbouring County Kerry. He was the eldest of 11 children and his family life was immersed in the Catholic faith. His uncle was a priest in Australian and he had a number of cousins who were in religious congregations. He was the altar server at the local St Mary's Cathedral parish for a number of years and by the time he was 18, decided to enter the seminary. He entered All Hallow College, Dublin, a seminary established for priests who would be sent overseas, in 1971.

== Priesthood ==
He was ordained in Ireland by Archbishop Tomas O’Fiaich in June 1978, when he was 24 years old. He was immediately appointed to be a priest for the Archdiocese of Melbourne, arriving in September 1978.

He was first appointed to the Hadfield parish in Melbourne's north. He has also served as an assistant priest in parishes in Clayton and Blackburn. He served as vocations director from the late 1980s. In the 1990s, he undertook further study at Loyola University Chicago. He was moderator and then pastoral director of Corpus Christi College Seminary.

From 1996 to 2004 he served as Parish Priest in Sunbury. In 2005 he was appointed director of ministry to priests in the Archdiocese of Melbourne. In 2012, he was appointed the inaugural parish priest of Christ the Light, taking in the areas of Doreen, Kinglake, Mernda and Whittlesea, where he served until his appointed as Auxiliary Bishop.

== Episcopate ==
Ashe was appointed Auxiliary Bishop of Melbourne by Pope Francis on 14 May 2021 and was given the titular see of Muteci, in Algeria. He was consecrated by Archbishop Peter Comensoli on 31 July 2021 in St Patrick's Cathedral, Melbourne along with Anthony Ireland.
