= Peter Chung Soon-taick =

South Korean Catholic bishop (born 1961)

His Excellency, The Most Reverend Peter Chung Soon-taick 정순택 베드로 鄭淳澤 베드로 OCD
- Metropolitan Archbishop of Seoul; Apostolic Administrator of Pyongyang
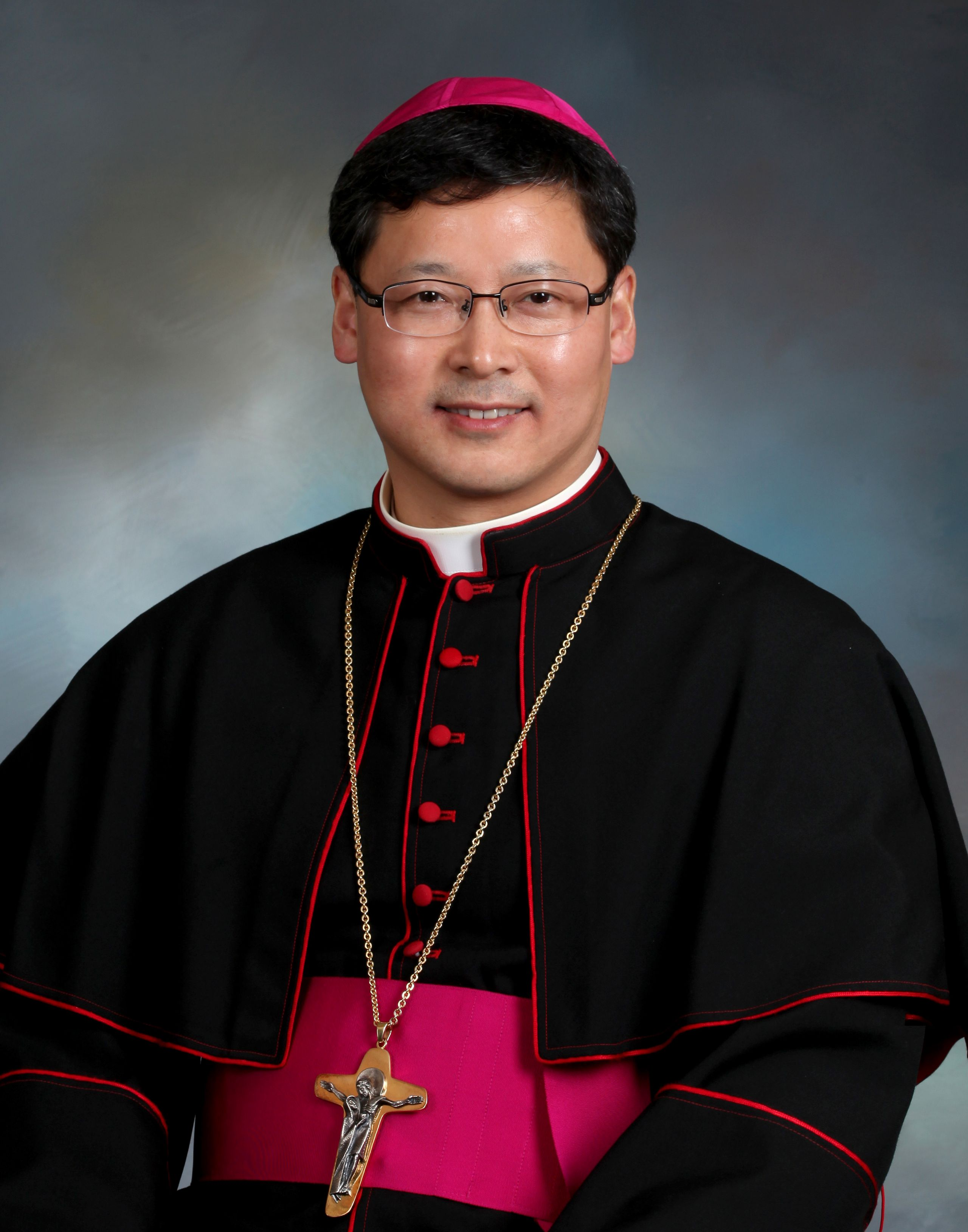
- Chung in 2014
- Native name: 정순택 베드로
- Church: Latin Church
- Archdiocese: Seoul
- See: Seoul
- Appointed: 28 October 2021
- Installed: 8 December 2021
- Predecessor: Andrew Yeom Soo-jung

Orders
- Ordination: 16 July 1992 by Stephen Kim Sou-hwan
- Consecration: 5 February 2014 by Andrew Yeom Soo-jung

Personal details
- Born: 정순택; Chung Soon-taick; 5 August 1961 (age 65) Daegu, South Korea
- Motto: 하느님 아버지, 어머니 교회 (Haneunim abeoji, eomeoni gyohoe); Deus Pater, Mater Ecclesia; God the Father, Mother Church
- Coat of arms

Styles of Peter Chung Soon-taick
- Reference style: The Most Reverend
- Spoken style: Your Excellency
- Religious style: Archbishop

Peter Chung Soon-taick OCD (Korean: 정순택 베드로; Hanja: 鄭淳澤; born 5 August 1961) is a South Korean prelate of the Catholic Church. Since December 2021, he has been the Metropolitan Archbishop of Seoul and Apostolic Administrator of Pyongyang.

== Biography ==
=== Early life ===
Chung was born on 5 August 1961 in Daegu, South Korea. In 1983 he began his studies in the Department of Industrial Chemistry at Seoul National University's College of Engineering, earning his degree in 1986. He studied at the Songsin Theological Campus of the Catholic University of Korea. He entered the novitiate of the Order of Discalced Carmelites of Korea from 1986 to 1992. On 25 January 1992, he took his perpetual vows.

=== Priest ===
Chung was ordained a Carmelite priest on 16 July 1992. He then earned a master's degree in Sacred Scripture at the Pontifical Biblical Institute. From 2005 to 2008, he served as Provincial Definitor of the Order of Discalced Carmelites of Korea and Vice-master of Incheon monastery and from 2008 to 2009, he served as the first Definitor of the Order of Discalced Carmelites of Korea and served as the Definitor General of the Order of Discalced Carmelites in Rome for the Far East and Oceania from 2009 to 2013.

=== Bishop ===
On 30 December 2013, Pope Francis appointed him an Auxiliary Bishop of Seoul and titular bishop of Tamazuca. He was consecrated with Timothy Yu Gyoung-chon on 5 February 2014 in the Changcheon-dong Stadium, Seoul, by Andrew Yeom Soo-jung, Archbishop of Seoul, assisted by Basil Cho Kyu-man, Vicar General of Seoul, and Linus Lee Seong-hyo, Auxiliary Bishop of Suwon. He chose as his episcopal motto: Deus Pater, Mater Ecclesia, meaning "God the Father, Mother Church" (Korean: 하느님 아버지, 어머니 교회).

=== Archbishop ===
On 28 October 2021, Pope Francis appointed him Metropolitan Archbishop of Seoul to succeed Cardinal Andrew Yeom Soo-jung. Chung was installed at the Myeongdong Cathedral of Our Lady of the Immaculate Conception on 8 December 2021.

== Notes ==
Catholic Church titles
Preceded by John Bernard McDowell	— TITULAR — Titular Bishop of Tamazuca; 30 December 2013 – 28 October 2021	Succeeded by Subroto Boniface Gomes
Preceded by Andrew Yeom Soo-jung	Archbishop of Seoul; 28 October 2021 – present	Incumbent
Preceded by Andrew Yeom Soo-jung	Apostolic Administrator of Pyongyang; 28 October 2021 – present	Incumbent
