= Castellum Iabar =

Ancient Roman town in Mauretania Caesariensis

Roman Empire - Mauretania Caesariensis (125 AD)

Castellum Iabar was an ancient Roman-Berber civitas in the province of Mauretania Caesariensis. The town was also the seat of a Catholic Church diocese.

An exact location of the ancient town is not currently known. It has been tentatively linked with the Kalaat fortress near Tiaret, Algeria. Tiaret is also identified with the Roman town of Tingartia.

The ancient Bishopric survives today as a titular see of the Roman Catholic Church. and the current bishop is João Miranda Teixeira.
