= Corniculana =

The Diocese of Corniculana (Latin: Dioecesis Corniculanensis) is a suppressed and titular see of the Roman Catholic Church.

The bishopric was centered on a Roman town, of the Roman province of Mauretania Caesariensis now lost to history but which flourished in late antiquity but did not last long after the Muslim conquest of the Maghreb. An exact location for that town is not known but Corniculana, was in what is today Algeria.

Nothing is known of the history of this diocese and of the city, except that among the Catholic bishops called to Carthage in 484 by the Vandal king Huneric was a bishop Syrus Corniculanensis, who was probably exiled as were most Catholic bishops of the day.

Today Corniculana survives as a titular bishopric and current bishop is Oscar Augusto Múnera Ochoa, who also served as apostolic vicar of Tierradentro until July 2024.

== See also ==
- Mauretania Caesariensis
