= Diocese of Maura =

Former bishopric of the Roman Catholic Church

The Diocese of Maura (Latin: Dioecesis Maurensis) was a bishopric of the Roman Catholic Church.

The ecclesiastical seat of the diocese was located in a Roman–Berber civitas in the Roman province of Mauretania Caesariensis. The exact location of the town is not known for certain though Maura is tentatively identified with ruins at Duel-Zerga in modern Algeria. The ancient town flourished in late antiquity, but did not last long after the Muslim conquest of the Maghreb.

There are no known ancient bishops associated with the diocese. Maura was one of several civitas for which the bishop's role was vacant in 484 AD. It survives as a Catholic Church titular bishopric. The title is now held by Enzo Tenci, auxiliary bishop emeritus of Rome.
