= Karel Herbst =

Czech Roman Catholic bishop (born 1943)

The Most Reverend Karel Herbst SDB
- Auxiliary Bishop of Prague
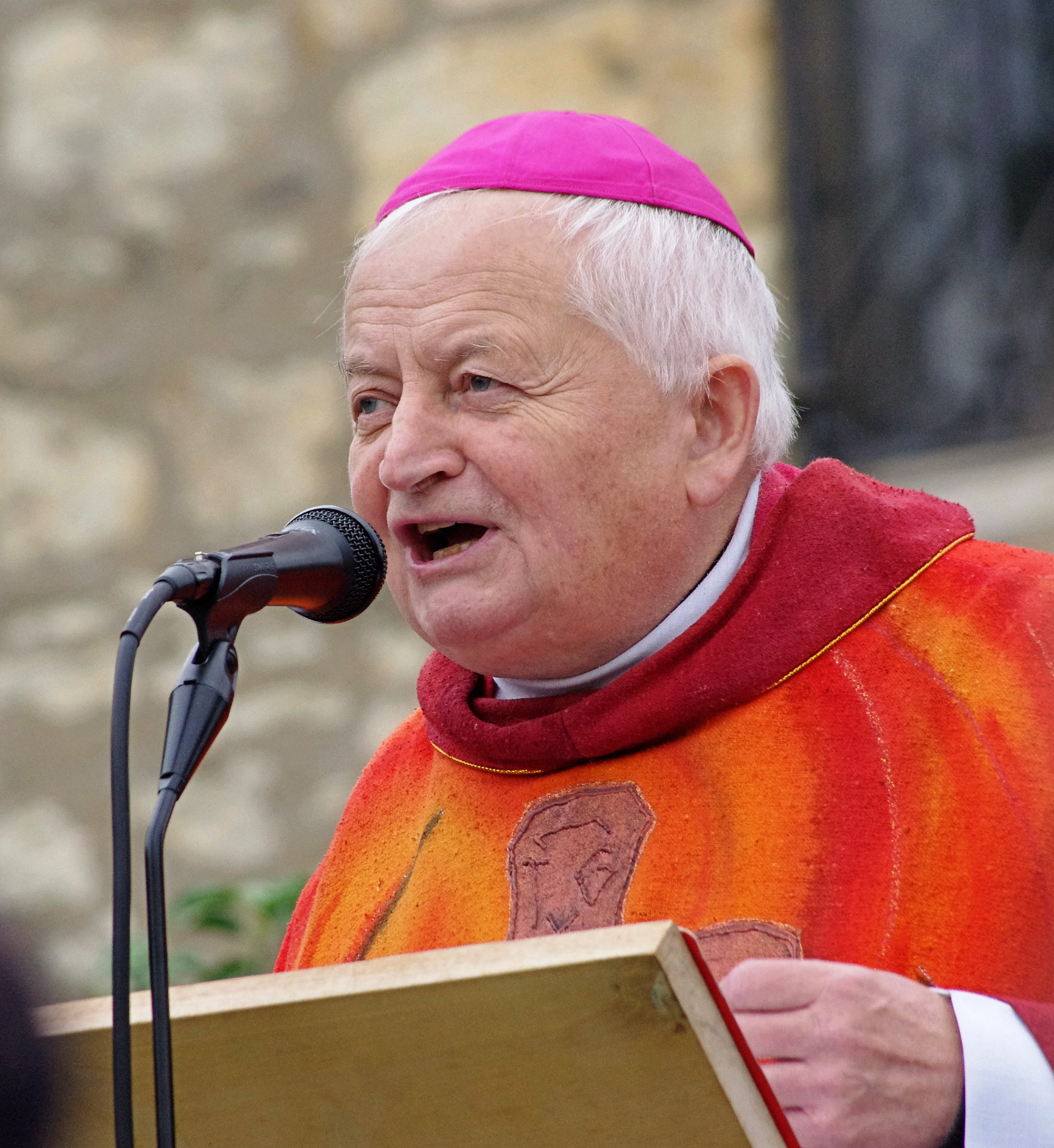
- Church: Catholic Church
- Archdiocese: Prague
- Appointed: 19 February 2002
- Term ended: 1 December 2016
- Other post: Titular bishop of Siccesi

Orders
- Consecration: 6 April 2002

Personal details
- Born: 6 November 1943 (age 82) Prague, Protectorate of Bohemia and Moravia

Karel Herbst (born 6 November 1943, in Prague) is an emeritus auxiliary bishop of Prague, a titular bishop of Siccesi and Salesian. In the 1980s, he was the main organizer of the Salesian huts, holiday events for children in the Catholic underground. Among their participants he was known as Kája. On February 19, 2002, he was appointed and appointed on 6 April 2002 by the Assistant Bishop of the Prague Roman Catholic Archdiocese. From 1 December 2016, at his own request, he became an emeritus Bishop.

He suffered from coronavirus disease in March 2020.
