= Diocese of Mauriana =

Latin Catholic titular see

The Diocese of Mauriana (Latin: Dioecesis Maurianensis) is a Latin Church suppressed diocese and modern titular see of the Catholic Church.

During the Roman Empire the seat of the diocese was Mauriana, a Roman town of the Roman province of Mauretania Caesariensis. The Roman town is now lost to history but flourished in late antiquity though it did not last long after the Muslim conquest of the Maghreb. An exact location for that town is not known but Mauriana, was in what is today Algeria.

== Known bishops ==
Two bishops are known from late antiquity, and five from the 20th century:

- Luciano (fl. 337 circa)
- Secondo (fl.484)
- Johannes Gerardus Maria Willebrands (1964–1969)
- Pio Laghi (1969–1991
- Petar Šolic (1991–1992)
- Juan Carlos Maccarone (1993–1996)
- Nicholas Anthony DiMarzio (1996–1999)
- Aurel Percă, (1999–current)

== History ==
Second, who took part in the synod assembled in Carthage in 484 by the Arian King Huneric of the Vandal Kingdom, after which he was exiled. Morcelli also assigned to Mauriana the bishop Luciano, who would attend a council in Rome in 337; According to Mesnage however, he must have been from another bishopric, because he can not understand how a dark bishop of Mauritania Cesariense could attend a synod in Rome in the first half of the fourth century.

Today Mauriana survives as a titular bishopric and the current bishop is Aurel Percă, auxiliary bishop of Iaşi.
