= Grimidi =

Ancient Roman town in North Africa

Roman Empire - Mauretania Caesariensis (125 AD).

Grimidi was an ancient Roman town of the Roman province of Mauretania Caesariensis, located at 3.73031 35.87687 in North Africa. It flourished from about 30BC to about 640AD. Numerous ruins litter the site.

== Bishopric ==
The diocese of Tamazuca (Latin: Dioecesis Tamazucensis) is a suppressed and titular see of the Roman Catholic Church. It is presumed that the diocese of Tamazuca, was centered on the ancient town Grimidi in today's Algeria.

Known bishops have included:

- Dacianus (fl.411) (A Donatist bishop who attended the Catholic/Donatist conference of 411.)
- Lucius (fl.484) A Catholic bishop who attended the 484 AD synod called by Huneric, king of the Vandals.
- John Bernard McDowell (1966–2010)
- Peter Chung Soon-taick (2013–2021)
