= Rapidum =

Roman fort and settlement in Mauretania

- Map showing the location of Rapidum, south of Icosium (present-day Algiers)

- Location within Algeria
- 36.13333°N 3.43333°E
- Location: Algeria
- Region: Médéa Province

Rapidum was a Roman settlement and fort located in Mauretania Caesariensis, nearly 100 km south of Icosium (Algiers).

== History ==
The Romans built a fort in what is now Sour Djouab (south of present-day Algiers) during the first century of their rule in Mauretania between Castellum Tingitanum (El Asnam) and Auzia (Sour el Ghozlane), in order to expand their control of the interior of the region. Soon under Hadrian near the fort grew up a civilian settlement called "Rapidum", on the Roman road called the Nova Praetentura, which connected Numidia with Mauretania Tingitana and passed through Rapidum.

The original castrum of Rapidum remained until 201 AD, while the town survived until emperor Aurelian when it was destroyed by Berber nomads. The later emperor Diocletian rebuilt it during the late 3rd century with huge buildings which lasted until the Arab invasions.

There are two distinct parts to Rapidum: the camp and the town. The camp is rectangular with rounded corners. It dates to 122 AD(CIL VIII, 20833). The enceinte is made of two ashlar walls enclosing interior rubble fill. It is reinforced by towers standing on either side of the four gates, one on each side of the camp. The praetorium is located at the intersection of the decumanus and the cardo. It measures 28 x 24.5 m and, in accordance with the classic plan, has three parts... Five rooms open on this hall, all scholae, except for the middle one, which ended in an apse and must have been a chapel for the standards. Some meters south of the praetorium, a huge building may have served as a stable. Close by and to the south stands another large building, presumably the commander's residence (27 x 19.5 m); small private baths and seven rooms are arranged around a court. The rest of the camp was occupied by barracks and standard baths. Of note is a curious relief depicting the salutatio, encased in the west gate.The town, contiguous to the camp on the south side (but not on the W), is itself surrounded by ramparts, built in 167 AD Princeton E.

The initial garrison of Rapidum fort was – according to historian M. Ruiu – the Cohors II Sardorum and protected the new limes of the Roman Empire moved south from the Mediterranean shores to a military road called Nova Praetentura. This road went from Rapidum near Numidia to Altava and to Numerus Syrorum at the border of Mauretania Tingitana.

Rapidum was named "municipium" and had an extension of 15 hectares under Marcus Aurelius (with nearly 4,000 inhabitants, mostly romanised Berbers, like Auzia).

The city was later destroyed by Berber rebellions, but Diocletian restored the city that had even huge Roman thermae. Pieces of colossal statues of Jupiter and Minerva suggest the existence of a "Capitol". There also undoubtedly was a temple to Ceres.

The fort was abandoned around 325 AD, while the city remained some centuries more (even if it never fully recovered).

Rapidum was conquered by the Vandals and later reduced to a small village, probably Christian (at Aïn Tamda, just west of Rapidum ruins, a group of Christian buildings (church and monastery) has been excavated)- was occupied by the Romano–Berber Kingdom of Altava in the 6th century. It disappeared with the Muslim conquest of the Maghreb in the 7th century. Today only some ruins remain, excavated in the 1920s by the French colonists.

== Bishopric ==
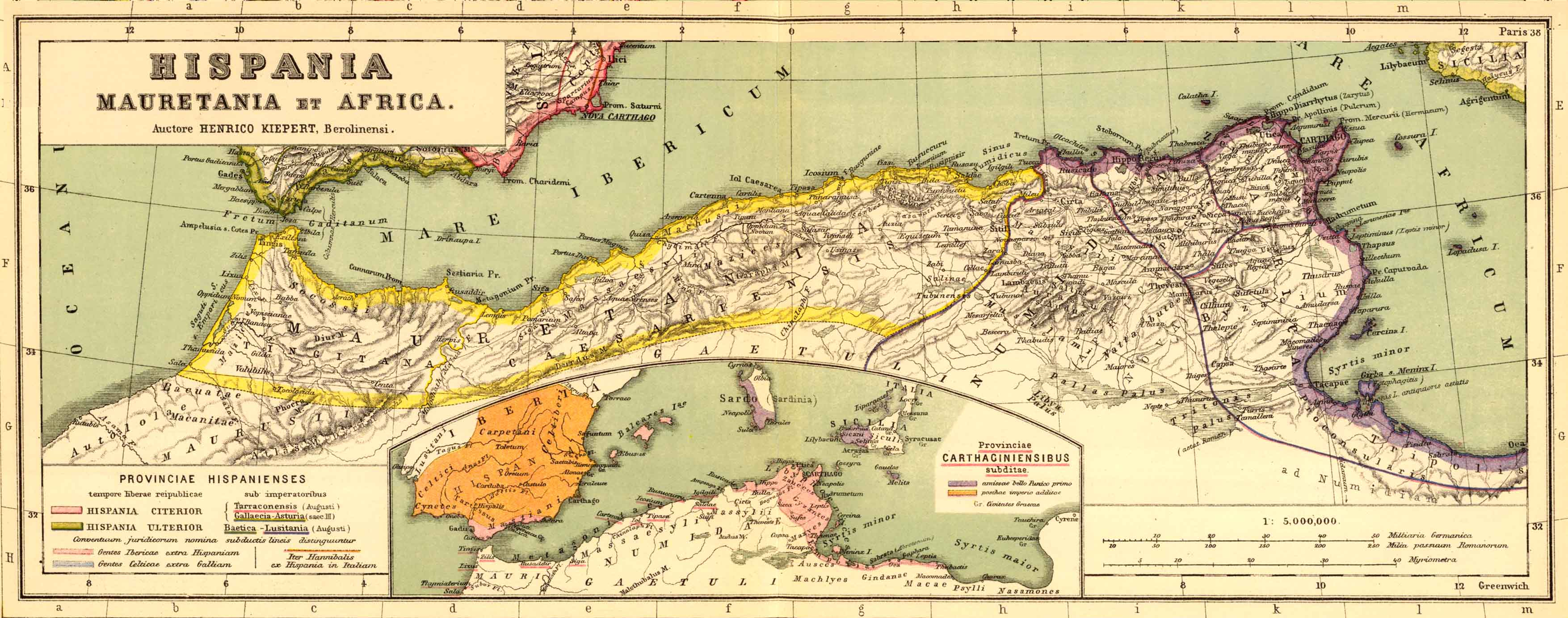
Mauretania & Numidia

Rapidum was center of an ancient bishopric and remains a titular see of the Roman Catholic Church in the province of Mauretania Caesariensis.

Bishops

- Raul Nicolau Gonçalves (5 Jan 1967 Appointed – 30 Jan 1978)
- Gyula Szakos (31 Mar 1979 Appointed – 5 Apr 1982)
- Mieczyslaw Jaworski (7 May 1982 Appointed – 19 Aug 2001)
- Brian Vincent Finnigan (31 Jan 2002 Appointed – )

== See also ==
- Altava
- Icosium
- Castellum Tingitanum
- Icosium
- Mauretania Caesariensis
- Rusadir
- Pomaria

== Bibliography ==
- Seston, Williams. Le secteur de Rapidum sur le Limes de Mauritanie césarienne après les fouilles de 1927 Persee Scientific Journals, volume 45. 1928
