= Arbal =

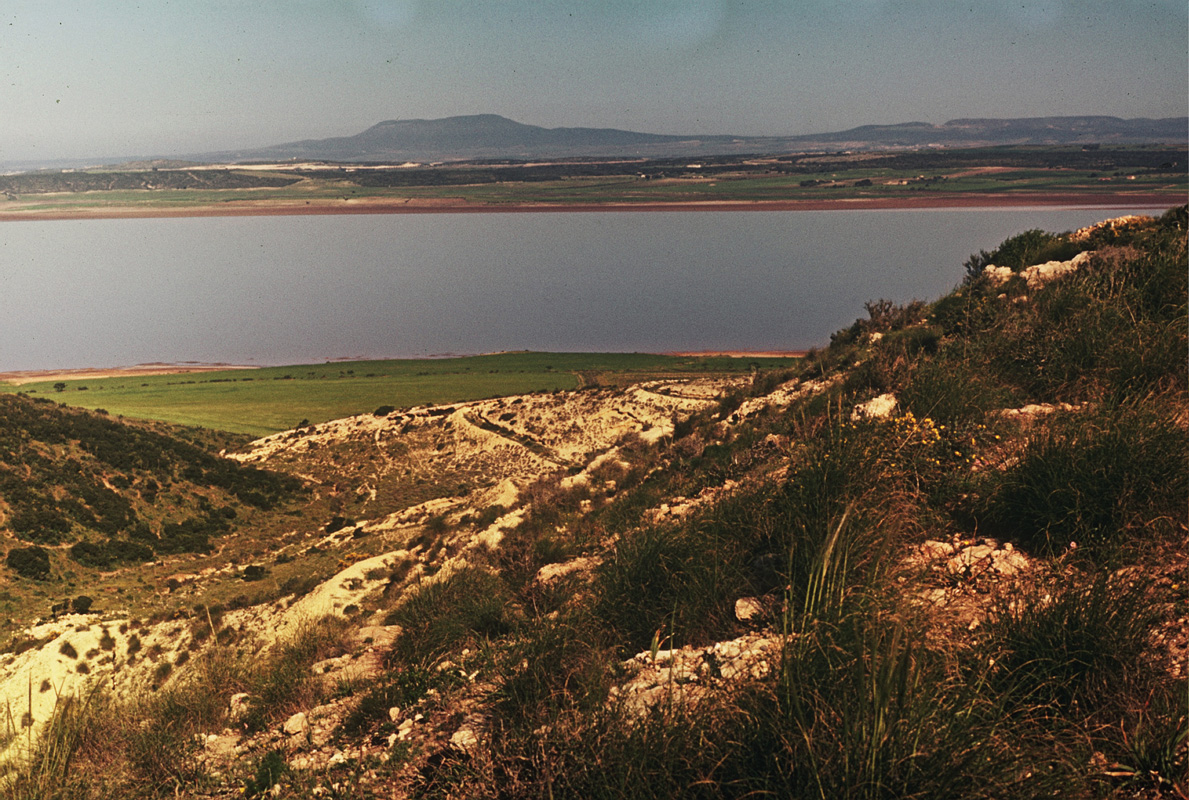
Countryside near Arbal

Arbal also known as Domaine d'Arbal, is a village in Oran Province, Algeria, North Africa.

Arbal is 167 m above sea level and 26 km south of Oran, on the southern side of the Sebkha d'Oran lakes. Arbal has been tentatively identified as the location of the ancient Roman town of Regiae.
