= Djouab =

Commune in Médéa Province, Algeria

Coordinates: 36°08′N 3°26′E

Djouab جواب Rapidum
- Commune and town
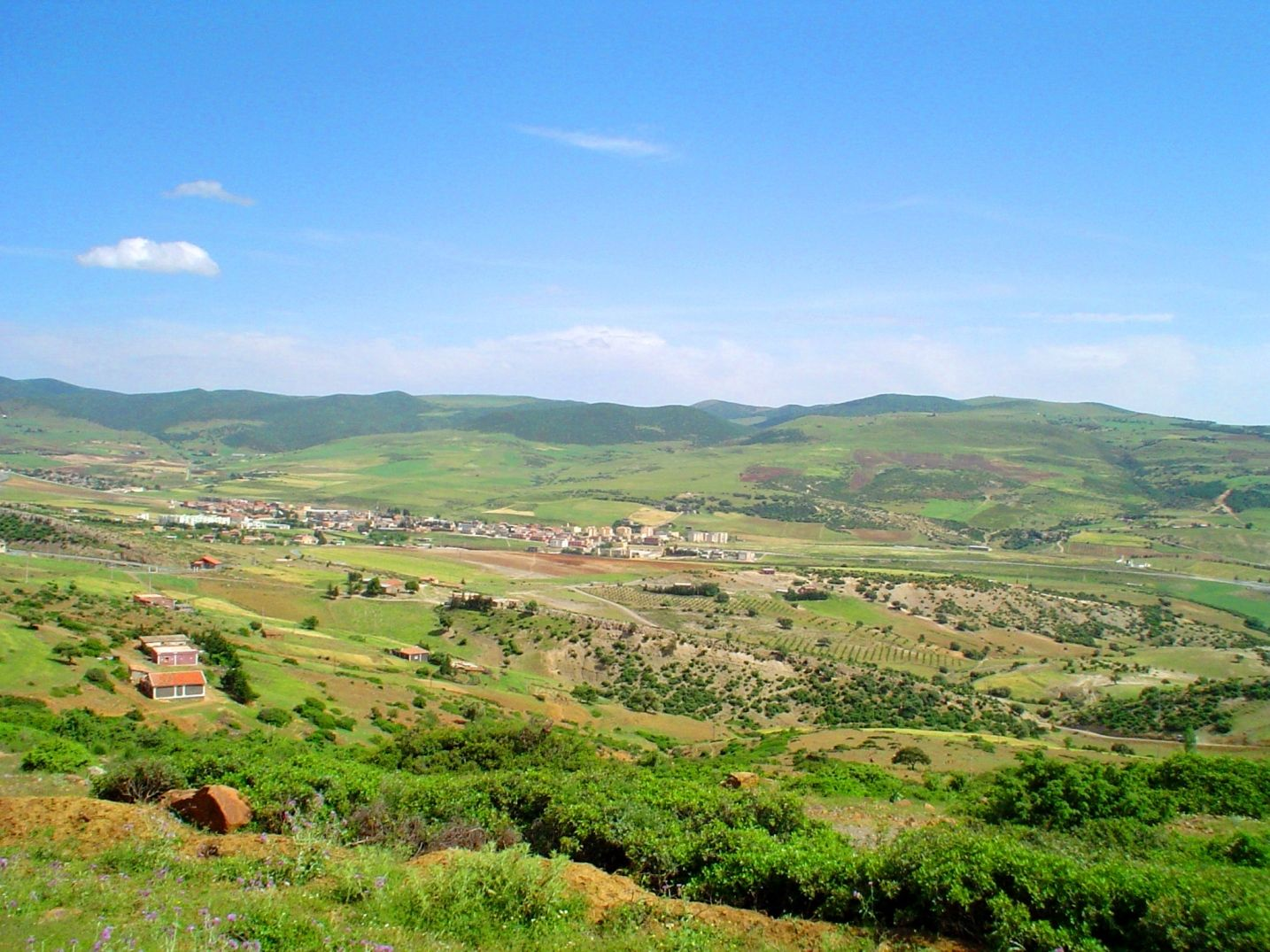
- Djouab جواب - panoramio.
- Nickname: Masqueray
- Interactive map of Djouab
- Country: Algeria
- Province: Médéa Province
- Elevation: 2,831 ft (863 m)

Population (1998)
  - Total: 16,751
  - Density: 240/sq mi (94/km^{2})
- Time zone: UTC+1 (CET)

Djouab is a town and commune in Médéa Province, Algeria. According to the 1998 census, it has a population of 16,751. Djouab is located at 36°08′00″ n., 3°26′00″ e.

Djouab is a commune in the wilaya of Médéa in Algeria. It was sometimes called Sour-Djouab, the "rampart of the Djouabs".

== History ==
The Rapidum military command had a fixed task if one took into account the urban framework of the town of Rapidum, with four bastions, a barracks, cellars, a large armory and well-aligned houses. Rapidum was a large agglomeration; Composed of families of soldiers and could have a population, estimated at more than 8 500 inhabitants. The town of Rapidum is erected over a total area of 375 ha, an army of four centurions under the orders of a Præfectus castris; And a Præfectus statorum, in charge of organizing the city police. The three military posts were constructed on the basis of a geographical study to allow for a rapid connection, taking into account the location of each post in relation to the other, designed to defend Auzia against repeated attacks by the Bavars (a Berber tribe, Also known as the Quinquagesimes or the five federated tribes from the regions of Djurdjura, the Babors and the Bibans.

The Ruins are protected by the APC which had erected a fence in 1996 to preserve the stones (rectangular form) were ransacked and stolen for use in constructions.

Djouab is the ancient Roman city of Rapidum, in the province of Mauretania Caesarean, identified by inscriptions which indicate its name and rank of municipality.

The site was recognized by the archaeologist Adrien Berbugger in 1845, and Henri Choisnet found in 1882 the gates of the city.

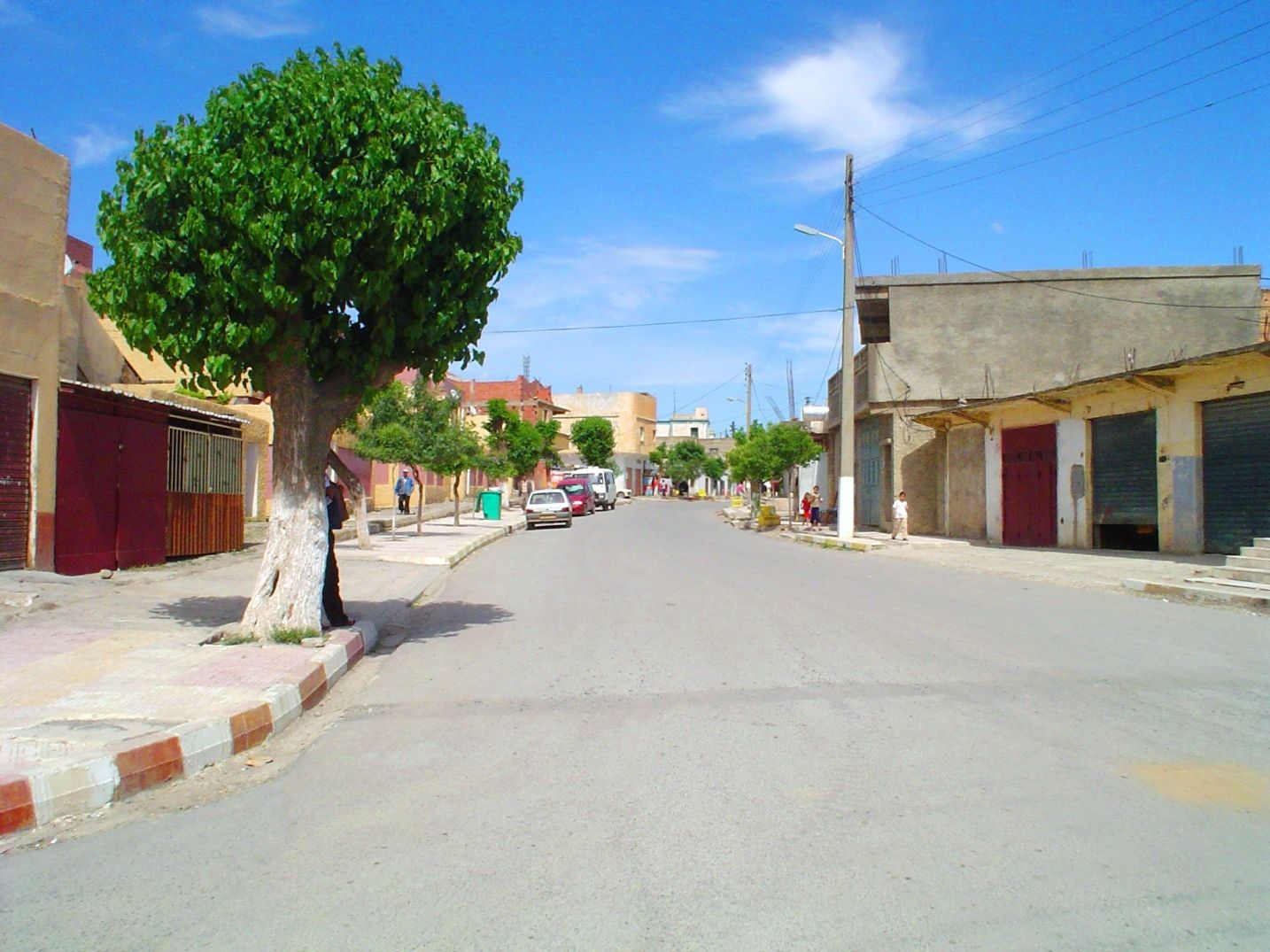
Djouab مدخل بلدية جواب - panorama.

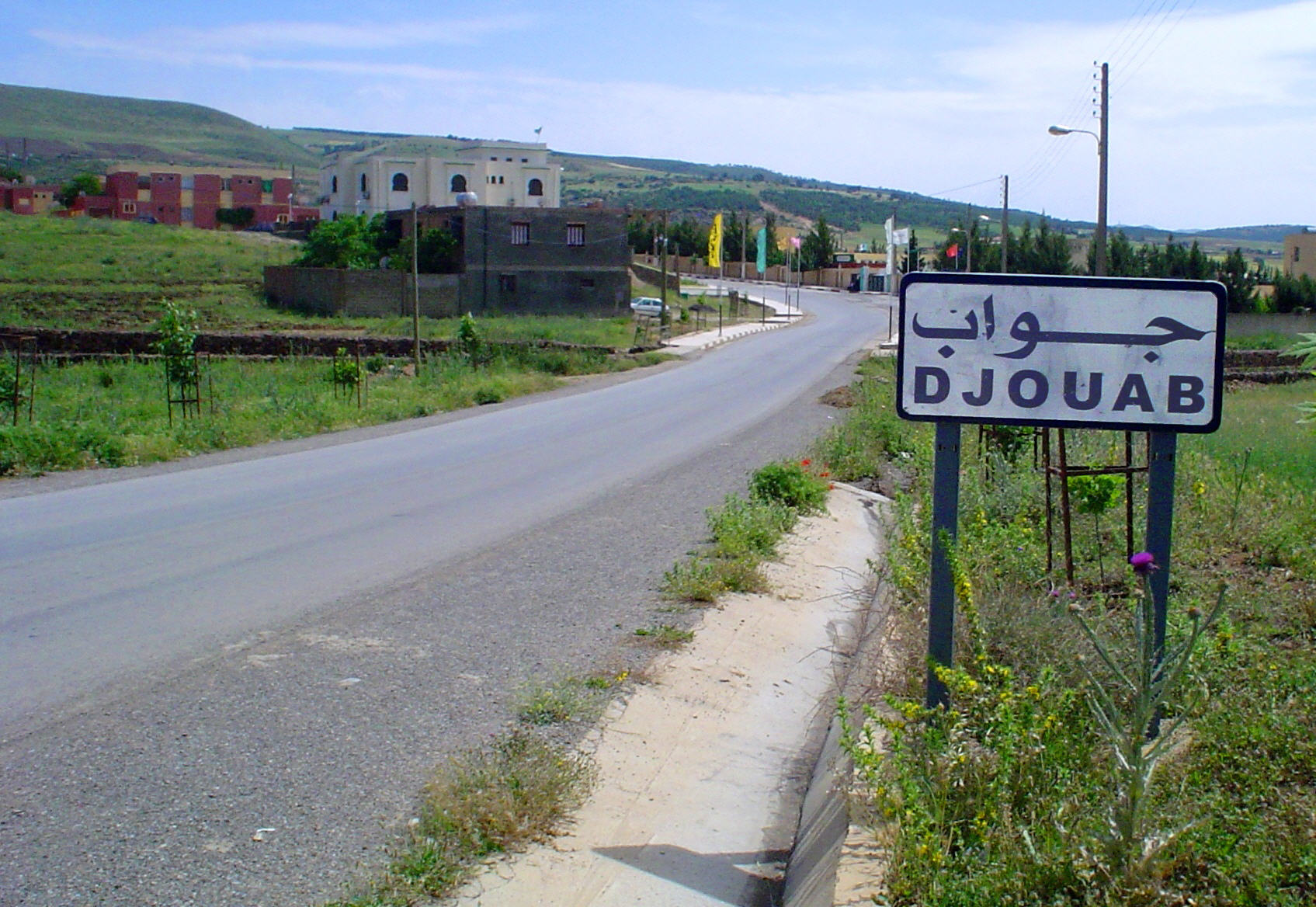
Djouab جواب.

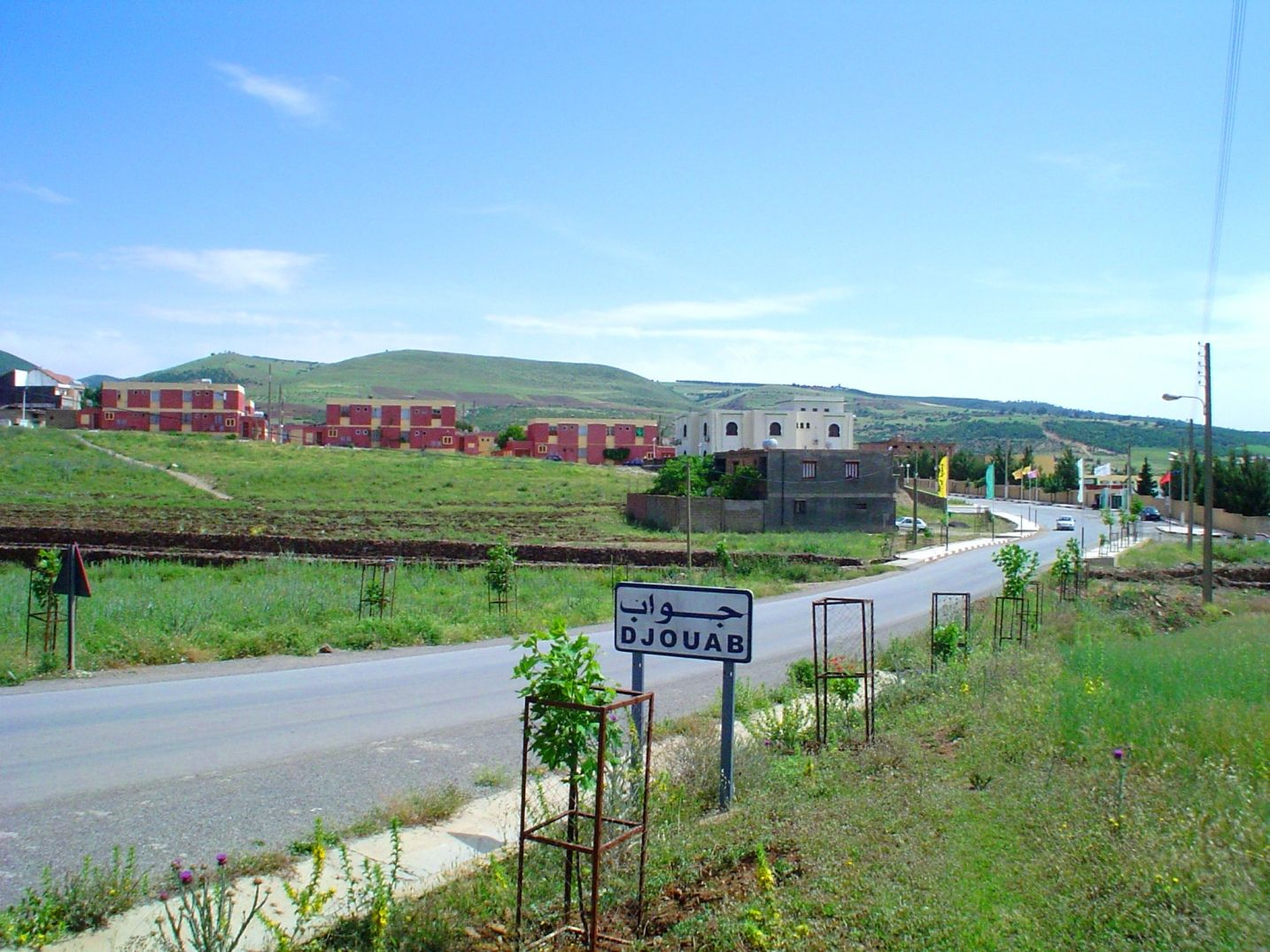
Djouab بلدية جواب - panorama
