= Caesarea in Mauretania =

Ancient city and bishopric in Roman North Africa

Coordinates: 36.6069°N 2.1967°E

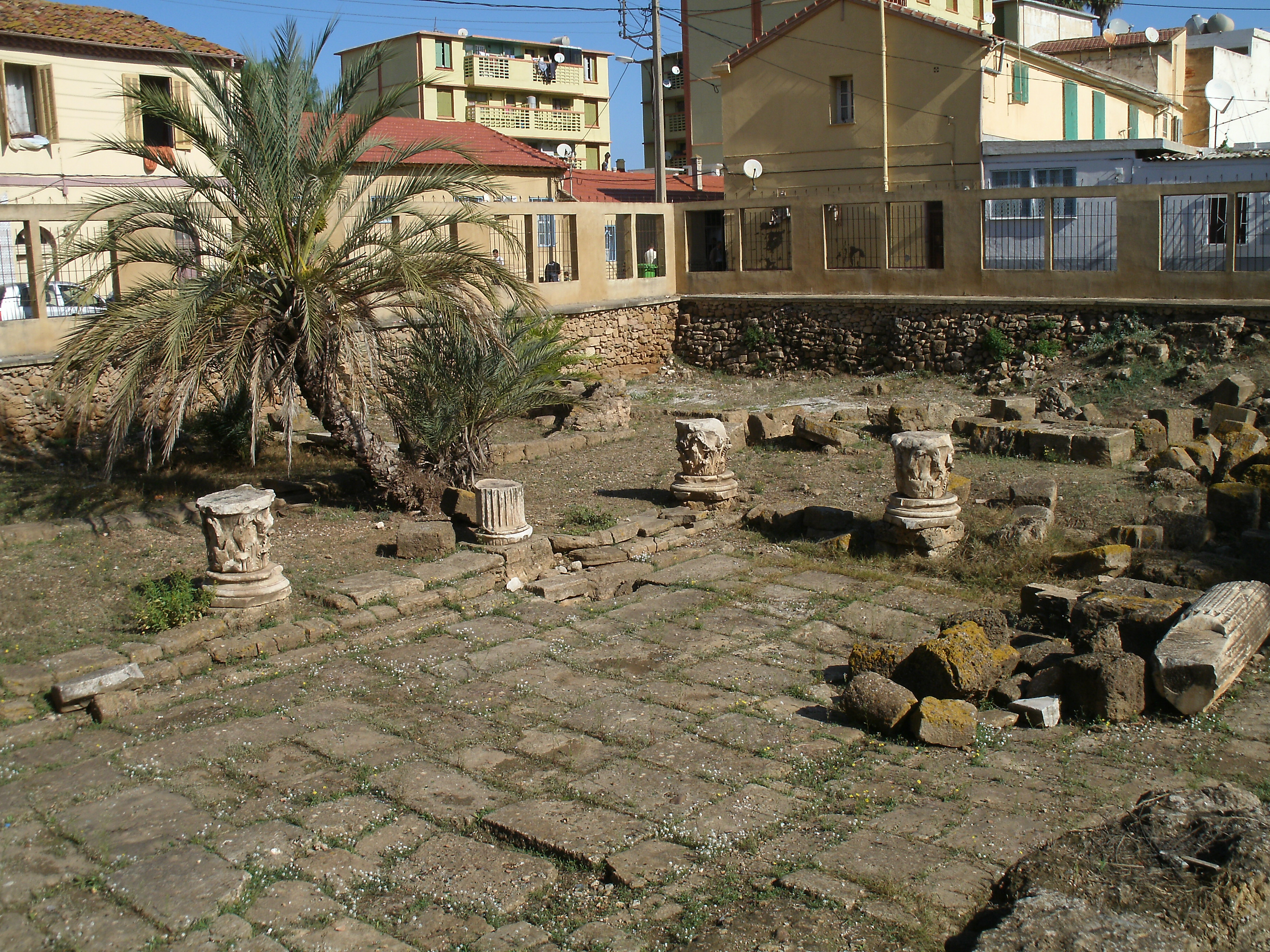
Remains of the Forum of Caesarea Mauretaniae.

Caesarea in Mauretania (Latin: Caesarea Mauretaniae, meaning "Caesarea of Mauretania") was a Roman colony in Roman-Berber North Africa. It was the capital of Mauretania Caesariensis and is now called Cherchell, in modern Algeria.

In the present time Caesarea is used as a titular see for Catholic and Eastern Orthodox bishops.

== History ==
=== Antiquity to third century AD ===
Phoenicians from Carthage founded a settlement on the northern coast of Africa, 100 km west of the present-day city of Algiers at present Cherchell around 400 BC to serve as a trading station and named the city Iol or Jol. It became a part of the kingdom of Numidia under Jugurtha, who died in 104 BC, and it became very significant to the Berber monarchy and generals of Numidia. The Berber King Bocchus II lived there. During the 1st century BC, due to the city’s strategic location, new defences were built.

The last Numidian king Juba II, was forced to flee the other part of Numidian kingdom because the local population disapproved of their king being too Romanized, which caused civil unrest between 26 and 20 BC. Roman Emperor Augustus had intervened in the situation and in 33 BC Rome and divided the Numidian Kingdom into two. One half of the kingdom became a part of the Roman province of Africa Nova, while western Numidia it was annexed to the kingdom of Mauretania and the kingdom was entrusted to Juba II. Although his father was once an ally of Pompey, Juba had lived in Rome under the tutelage of Julius Caesar, learning to read and write Greek and Latin. As he was considered too Roman to rule, Juba was at the mercy of civil unrest when Emperor Augustus intervened. Juba II renamed Iol Caesarea or Caesarea Mauretaniae, in honor of the emperor. Caesarea would become the capital of the Roman client kingdom of Mauretania, which became one of the important client kingdoms in the Roman Empire, and their dynasty was among the most loyal client Roman vassal rulers.

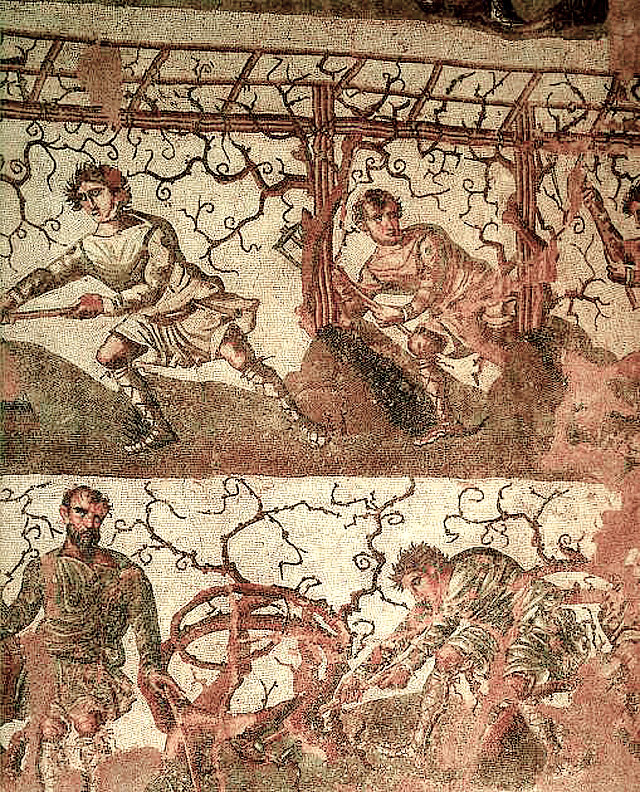
Mosaic of vineyard workers from Caesarea in Mauretania

Juba II, in the same year he became king of Mauretania, married Cleopatra Selene II, daughter of Cleopatra VII and Mark Antony. The rulers did not just renamed the capital, but rebuilt the town as a typical Graeco-Roman city in fine Roman style on a large, lavish and expensive scale, complete with street grids, a theatre, an art collection and a lighthouse similar to the one at Alexandria. The construction and sculptural projects in Caesarea and throughout the kingdom were built in a rich mixture of ancient Egyptian, Greek and Roman architectural styles. The monarchs are buried in their mausoleum, the Royal Mausoleum of Mauretania which can still be seen. The seaport capital and its kingdom flourished during this period with most of the population being of Greek and Phoenician origin with a minority of Berbers. It remained a significant power center with a Greco-Roman civilization as a veneer, until 40 AD, when its last monarch Ptolemy of Mauretania was murdered on a visit to Rome. The murder of Ptolemy set in motion a series of reactions resulting in a devastating war with Rome.

In 44 AD after a four-year bloody revolt, the capital was captured and Roman Emperor Claudius divided the Mauretanian kingdom into two provinces. The province of which Caesarea became the capital was called Mauretania Caesariensis after it. The city itself was settled with Roman soldiers and was given the rank of a colonia, and so was also called Colonia Claudia Caesarea. In later centuries, the Roman population expanded, as did the Berber population, resulting in a mixed Greco-Phoenician, Berber and Roman population. The city featured a hippodrome, amphitheatre, basilica, numerous Greek temples and Roman civic buildings. During this heyday, the city had its own school of philosophy, academy and library. As a significant city of the Roman Empire it had trading contacts across the Roman world.

=== Romanization and Christianity center ===
Considered to be one of the more loyal of Roman provincial capitals, Caesarea grew under Roman rule in the 1st and 2nd century AD, soon reaching a population of over 30,000 inhabitants. In 44 AD, during the reign of Emperor Claudius it became the capital of the imperial province of Mauretania Caesarensis. Later, the emperor made it a colonia, “Colonia Claudia Caesarea”. As with many other cities throughout the empire, he and his successors further Romanized the area, building monuments, enlarging the bath houses, adding an amphitheatre, and improving the aqueducts. Later, under the Severan dynasty, a new forum was added. The city was sacked by Berber tribes during a revolt in 371/372 AD, but recovered. In later centuries, the Roman population expanded, as did the Berber population, resulting in a mixed Berber and Roman population. The city was mostly Romanized under Septimius Severus and it grew to be a very rich city with nearly 100,000 inhabitants, according to historian Gsell. In about 165 AD, it was the birthplace to the future Roman Emperor Macrinus.

It became a target of the Vandals, who arrived in Africa in 429 by which time much of Mauretania Caesariensis had become became virtually independent. Christianity had spread rapidly there in the 4th and 5th centuries. One of the 80 cities in the Maghreb was populated by Roman colonists from Italy. It remained an extremely loyalist force for the Roman Empire. The Roman Empire largely relied on its North African dominion for essential grain supply. The Vandal army and fleet burnt the town and turned many of its old magnificent Roman era buildings into Vandal citadels. Although this devastation was significant, the Vandal era saw restoration of much of the damage, an expansion in population, and the creation of a vibrant Romanized Germanic community. The area remained in Vandal hands until 533 AD, when the city was captured by the Byzantine Emperor Justinian I. The new rulers used the Greek language (along with Latin), but the Neo-Latin local dialect remained in use by the inhabitants. The city declined. The Roman and the semi-Romanised Vandal population held a stratified position over the growing numbers of Berbers it allowed to settle in return for cheap labor. This reduced the economic status of small freeholders and urban dwellers, especially what remained of the Vandal population, who comprised most of the local military forces. Furthermore, the increasing use of Berber workers ground down the Roman population of free peasants.

By the 8th century, the city and surrounding area had neither a strong urban middle class of free citizens, nor a rural population of freehold farmers, nor a crack military aristocracy of Vandal warriors and their retinue.

== Ecclesiastical history ==
Apart from some bishops who may have been of the church in Caesarea and whose names are engraved in inscriptions that have been unearthed, the first bishop whose name is preserved in extant written documents is Fortunatus, who took part in the Council of Arles of 314, which condemned Donatism as heresy. A letter of Symmachus mentions a bishop named Clemens in about 371/372 or 380. The town became a Donatist center and at the joint Conference of Carthage in 411, was represented both by the Donatist Emeritus and by the Catholic Deuterius. Augustine of Hippo has left an account of his public confrontation with Emeritus at Caesarea in the autumn of 418, after which Emeritus was exiled. The last bishop of Caesarea whose name is known from written documents was Apocorius, one of Catholic bishops whom Huneric summoned to Carthage in 484 and then sent into exile. An early 8th-century Notitia Episcopatuum still included this see.

=== Titular see ===
There was Caesarea in Mauretania, but there was a small city called Caesarea in Numidia (near the actual border between Algeria and Tunisia) as well. The latter was one of over 120 cities in the Roman province of Numidia important enough to become suffragan bishoprics of the Metropolitan of Carthage, but would fade away, plausibly at the seventh century advent of Islam. The ruins of this small Numidian city ruins are in Hammamet (French: Youks-les-Bains) in modern Algeria, but remains a Latin Catholic titular see. Its only historically documented incumbent, Dominicus, was among the Catholic bishops convoked to a Council of Carthage in 484 by king Huneric of the Vandal Kingdom and like most of them (unlike the Donatist schismatics) was exiled, in his case to Corsica. Morcelli also attributes to this see the Donatist heretic Cresconius, who probably was bishop in Caesariana (Numidia).

The diocese was nominally restored in 1933 as Latin titular bishopric of Caesarea in Numidia. It has had the following incumbents, partially of the fitting episcopal (lowest) rank, with two archiepiscopal exceptions:

- Giuseppe Della Cioppa (1 April 1953 – 18 October 1958) as emeritate; previously Titular Bishop of Tiberias (17 July 1943 – 2 December 1947) as Bishop-Prelate of Territorial Prelature of Acquaviva delle Fonti (17 July 1943 – 2 December 1947), and Bishop-Prelate of Territorial Prelature of Altamura (17 July 1943 – 2 December 1947), Bishop of Alife (Italy) (2 December 1947 – 1 April 1953)
- Wacław Wycisk (16 November 1958 – 22 March 1984) as Auxiliary Bishop of Diocese of Opole (16 November 1958 – 22 March 1984)
- Titular Archbishop: Alberto Bovone (5 April 1984-21 February 1998) as Roman Curia official: first Secretary of Roman Congregation for the Doctrine of the Faith (8 April 1984–13 June 1995), then Pro-Prefect of Congregation for the Causes of Saints (13 June 1995-23 February 1998); previously Undersecretary of above Congregation for the Doctrine of the Faith (21 May 1973–12 May 1984); later created Cardinal-Deacon of Ognissanti in Via Appia Nuova (21 February 1998–17 April 1998), Prefect of above Rolan Congregation for the Causes of Saints (23 February 1998-17 April 1998)
- Titular Archbishop: Augustine Kasujja (26 May 1998–present), as papal diplomat: Apostolic Nuncio to Algeria (26 May 1998–22 April 2004), Apostolic Nuncio to Tunisia (26 May 1998–22 April 2004), Apostolic Nuncio to Madagascar (22 April 2004–2 February 2010) and Apostolic Nuncio to Seychelles (22 April 2004-2 February 2010) and Apostolic Delegate to Comoro Islands (22 April 2004–2 February 2010) and Apostolic Nuncio to Mauritius (9 June 2004-2 February 2010), Apostolic Nuncio to Nigeria (2 February 2010–12 October 2016), Permanent Observer to Economic Community of West African States (ECOWAS) (13 December 2013–12 October 2016), Apostolic Nuncio to Luxembourg (26 May 1998–present) and Apostolic Nuncio to Belgium (26 May 1998-present)

== Sources ==
- Gams, Pius Bonifacius (1957). Series episcoporum Ecclesiae catholicae (in German). Graz: Akademische Druck- u. Verlagsanstalt. p. 464. OCLC 222366386.
- Landwehr, Christa; Kleinefenn, Florian (2006). Die römischen Skulpturen von Caesarea Mauretaniae. Denkmäler aus Stein und Bronze: Idealplastik : Bacchus und Gefolge; Masken; Fabelwesen; Tiere; Bukranien; nicht benennbare Figuren 3 3 (in German). ISBN 978-3-8053-3441-9. OCLC 929104128.
- Morcelli, Steph. Antonius (1816). Africa christiana (in Latin). Brixiae. pp. 406–407. OCLC 68636597.
- De Meyer, A; Van Cauwenbergh, Étienne (1953). 'Césarée de Numidie', in Dictionnaire d'Histoire et de Géographie ecclésiastiques, vol. XII (in French). Paris: Letouzey et Ané. ISBN 978-2-7063-0181-0. OCLC 491325043.
- Joseph Mesnage, L'Afrique chrétienne, Paris (1912)
