= Icosium =

Ancient city near Algiers in Africa

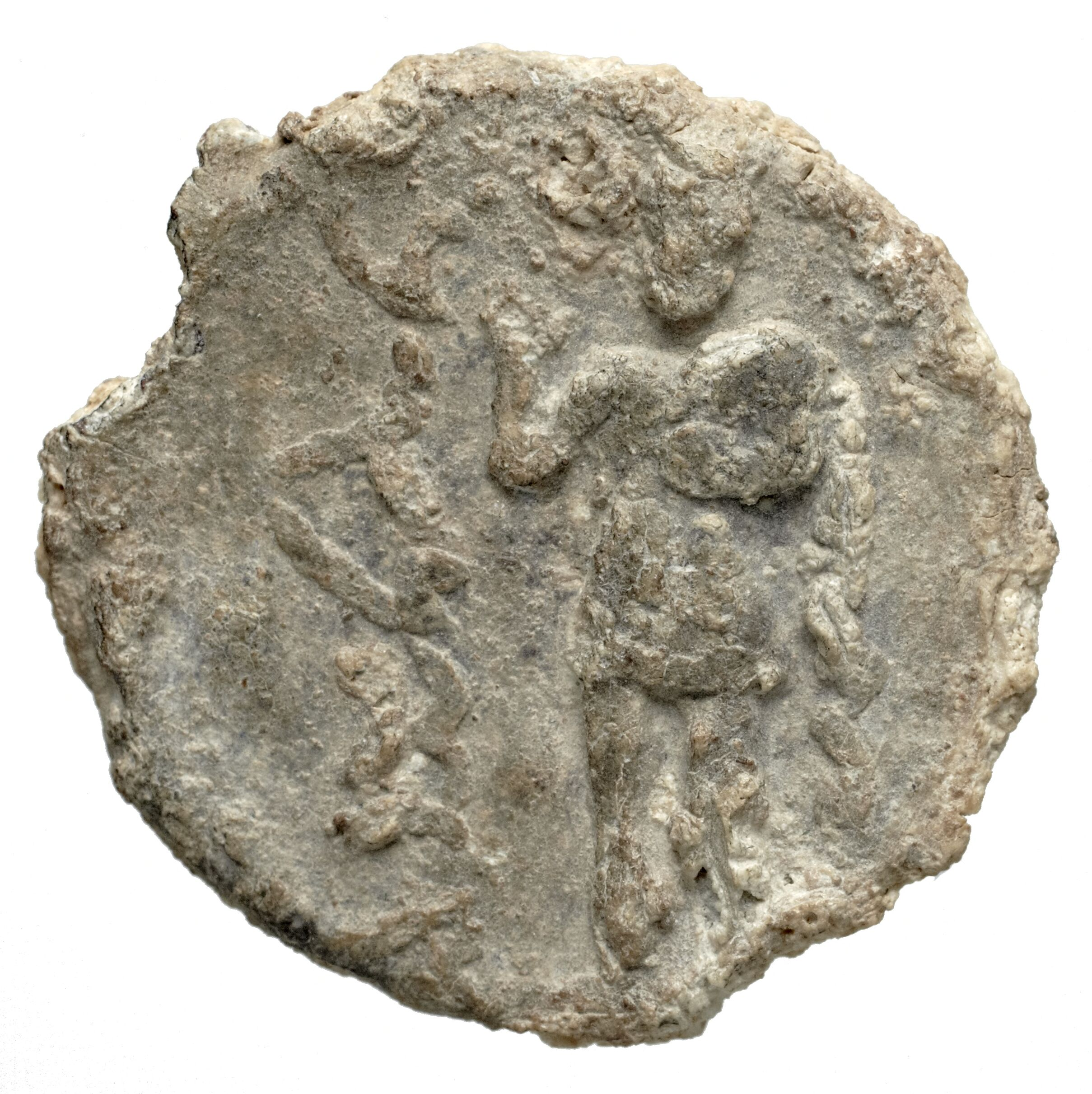
- A coin with the Punic name of Icosium

- Location within Algeria
- 36.7763°N 3.0585°E
- Location: Algeria
- Region: Algiers Province

Icosium (Punic: ʾy ksm, "Island of the Owls"; Ancient Greek: Ἰκόσιον, Ikósion) was a city of Berber origin and a Punic settlement, founded by Heracles and his companions in present-day Algeria. It was part of Numidia and later became an important Roman colony and an early medieval bishopric (now a Latin titular see) in the casbah area of modern Algiers.

== History ==
A roman veterans' colony was founded at I. during the reign of Juba II (Plin. HN 3,19; 5,20). Under Vespasian, the city became a Colonia Latin (CIL VIII Suppl. 3, 20853). Werner Huß — Brills N.P.

The history of Icosium goes back to around 400 BC when a small Berber village was created by some local fishermen. Only when 3000 Roman veterans settled there as colonists during the times of Augustus did Icosium grow in importance.

=== Legends ===
Icosium's Greek name Ikósion was later explained as deriving from the Greek word for "twenty" (εἴκοσι, 'eíkosi), supposedly because it had been founded by twenty companions of Heracles when he visited the Atlas Mountains during his labors.

However, the berber settlement was also occupied by some Punic settlers from at least as early as the 3rd century BC. They called it y-ksm or ʾy-ksm, which is believed to have meant "seagull's island", and which was eventually transcribed as Icosium in Latin. The original Punic name is reflected in the modern Arabic name for Algiers (Arabic: الجزائر, pronounced Al Jaza'ir), which means "the islands".

=== Roman town ===
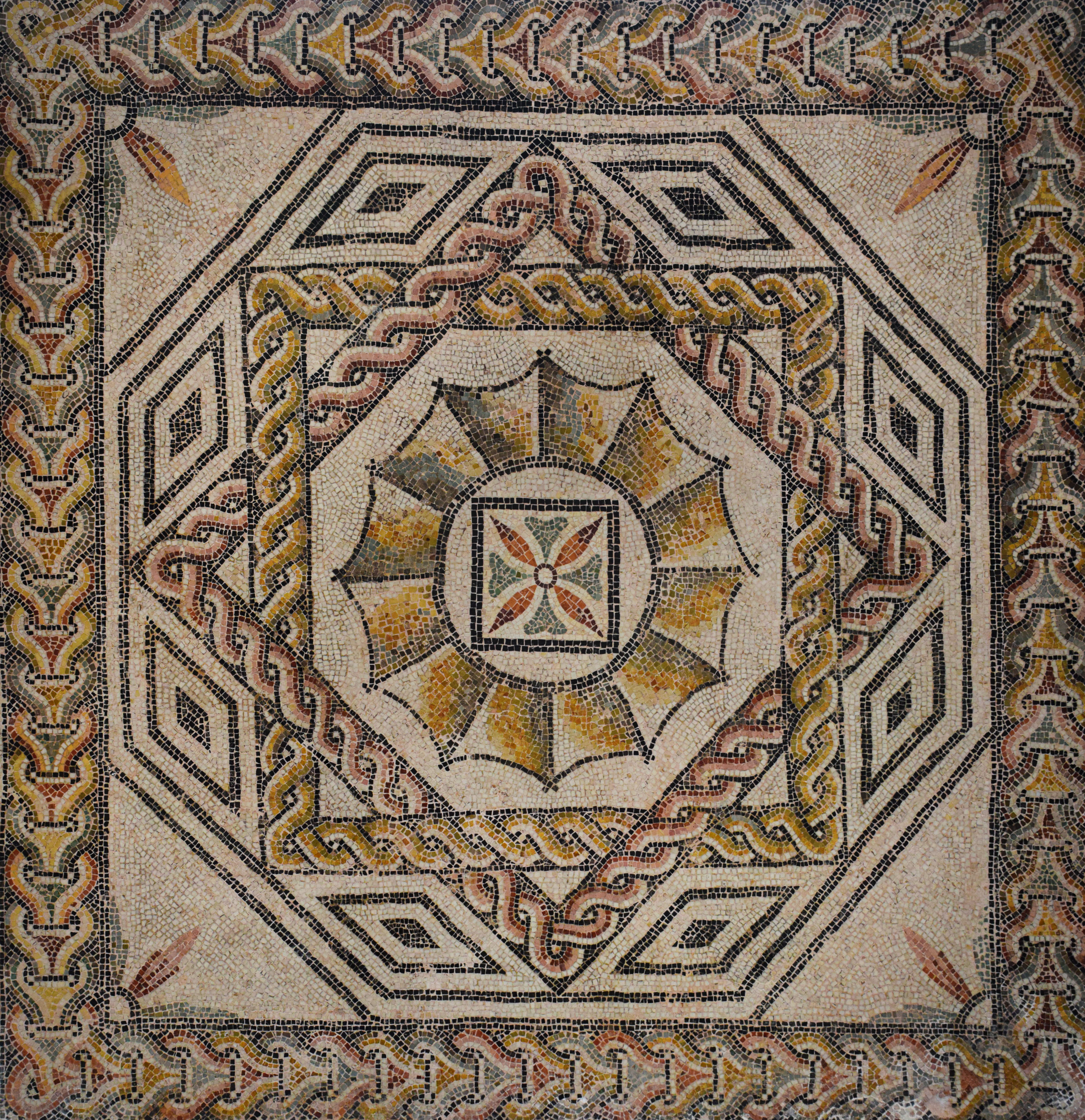
Abstract Mosaic from the Roman Period.

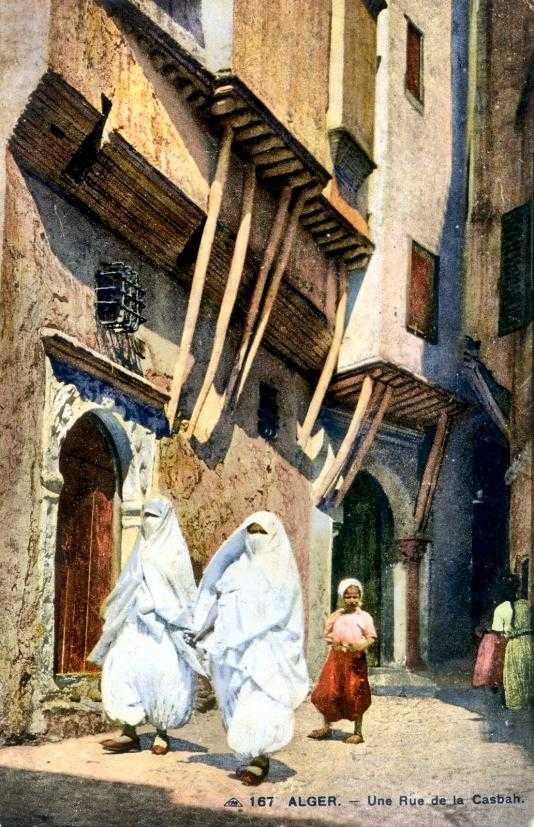
The actual "Casbah of Algiers" is built on Roman Icosium. This 1950 postcard shows what looks like a Roman column next to a building door (behind a kid)

Tacfarinas's revolt damaged the city, but Icosium was revived by the introduction of a colony of veteran Roman soldiers during the reign of Juba II. The city was given Latin rights (colonia Latina) by the emperor Vespasian. Roman Icosium existed on what was the "marine quarter" of the city of Algiers until 1940. Roman cemeteries existed near Bab-el-Oued and Bab Azoun.

Many Roman colonists settled in Icosium under Augustus and were later promoted to Roman colonia by Vespasian. Latin was the language spoken in the city in the first century AD. The city of nearly 15000 inhabitants, according to historian Theodore Mommsen was given full Latin rights by Roman emperor Vespasian.

By the 2nd century, an influx of Berbers from the countryside changed the settlement's demographics, so that Latin-speakers became a minority elite.

Algiers presents but few Roman remains; and it is still uncertain what name it bore under Latin sway, some thinking it "Icosium", and others Jomnium. Mr. Blofeld says that there are Roman ruins on the banks of the Savus (Haratob), south-east of Algiers; and he thinks this more probably the site of Icosium than Algiers. Mr. Berbrugger mentions the remains of a Roman via, Rue de la Marine, near the port of the capital, which he thinks must have corresponded in most respects with the old Moorish harbour before 1830. Mr. S. Marie informs us that at the quarter of the Gate of Victory, in the old town, there stood on one side of the gate, in 1845, a fountain of white marble, constructed among the ruins of a Roman aqueduct. — John Reynell Morell 1854, p. 449

Christianity started to be practiced in the late 2nd century and, in the early 4th century, was the main religion of the local Romanised Berbers in the city. The bishops of Icosium are mentioned as late as the 5th century. At the Christian council of Carthage in AD 419 (promoted by Saint Aurelius) went the bishop Laurentius "Icositanus", as representative of Mauretania Caesariensis; Saint Augustine wrote about him in a letter to Pope Celestine I.

=== Later history ===
Icosium remained part of the Roman Empire until it was conquered by Vandals in 430. In 442, an agreement between the Roman Empire and the Vandals allowed Icosium to be occupied by the Romans during the Vandal control of northern Mauretania Caesariensis. Some berber tribes took control of the city at the beginning of the 6th century, but the town was later reconquered by the Byzantine Empire.

Icosium was then destroyed by the Arabs and reduced to a very small village in the 8th century. Most of the Romanized inhabitants were killed or sent as slaves to Damascus. However, this claim is not supported by strong historical evidence. Until 950, only ruins remained of the Roman Icosium.

The Roman town stretched out along the coast with the hill behind it. It was protected by a rampart with towers. Parts survive today in several places...the fortifications enclosed part of the modern kasbah to the SW and the Bab-el-Oued district (of Algiers) to the NE. They extended as far as the former Bresson square to the SE. Outside, villas surrounded by gardens were located on the coastal plain and, more often, on the sides of the hills. The villas have produced sculptures: two female heads, a statue of Pomona, another statue of a female deity, a head of the emperor Hadrian; all are in the Algiers Museum. Inside the lower town, which was densely populated, a network of streets at right angles to each other formed insulae. Their plan can often be traced in the modern urban grid. The decumanus maximus followed the modern Bab-Azoun street...Of the monuments discovered or noted inside the town, the public baths are of particular importance. Four cisterns placed side by side and two ornamental mosaics indicate that a first bath building was under the old cathedral. A second was located under the former church of Notre Dame des Victoires. A third has been discovered in the suburbs to the SE, near the Jardin d'Essai. According to the inscription (CIL VIII, 9256), a mithraeum no doubt existed. No church is known, but two capitals and a fenestella confessionis (at the Algiers Museum) indicate the presence of an edifice for Christian worship. — M. Leglay 1976

Only in the 10th century started to be again developed by Buluggin ibn Ziri, a Berber who founded Algiers under the Zirid dynasty, to what is now the capital of modern Algeria. Indeed, the Casbah of Algiers (a UNESCO world heritage site) is founded mainly on the ruins of old Icosium. It is a mid-sized city which, built on a hill, goes down towards the sea and is divided in two: the High city and the Low city, that now are dangerously crumbling

== Religion ==
Around 400, a diocese of Icosium was established under Roman rule, which was suppressed around 500, presumably by the Arian Vandals. In 1700, the diocese was nominally restored as titular bishopric of Icosium (Italian: Icosio). On 10 August 1838 the titular see ceased to exist as the residential diocese was restored under the city's modern name as Roman Catholic Diocese of Algiers, which was promoted on 25 July 1866 as Metropolitan Archdiocese of Algiers.

=== List of bishops ===
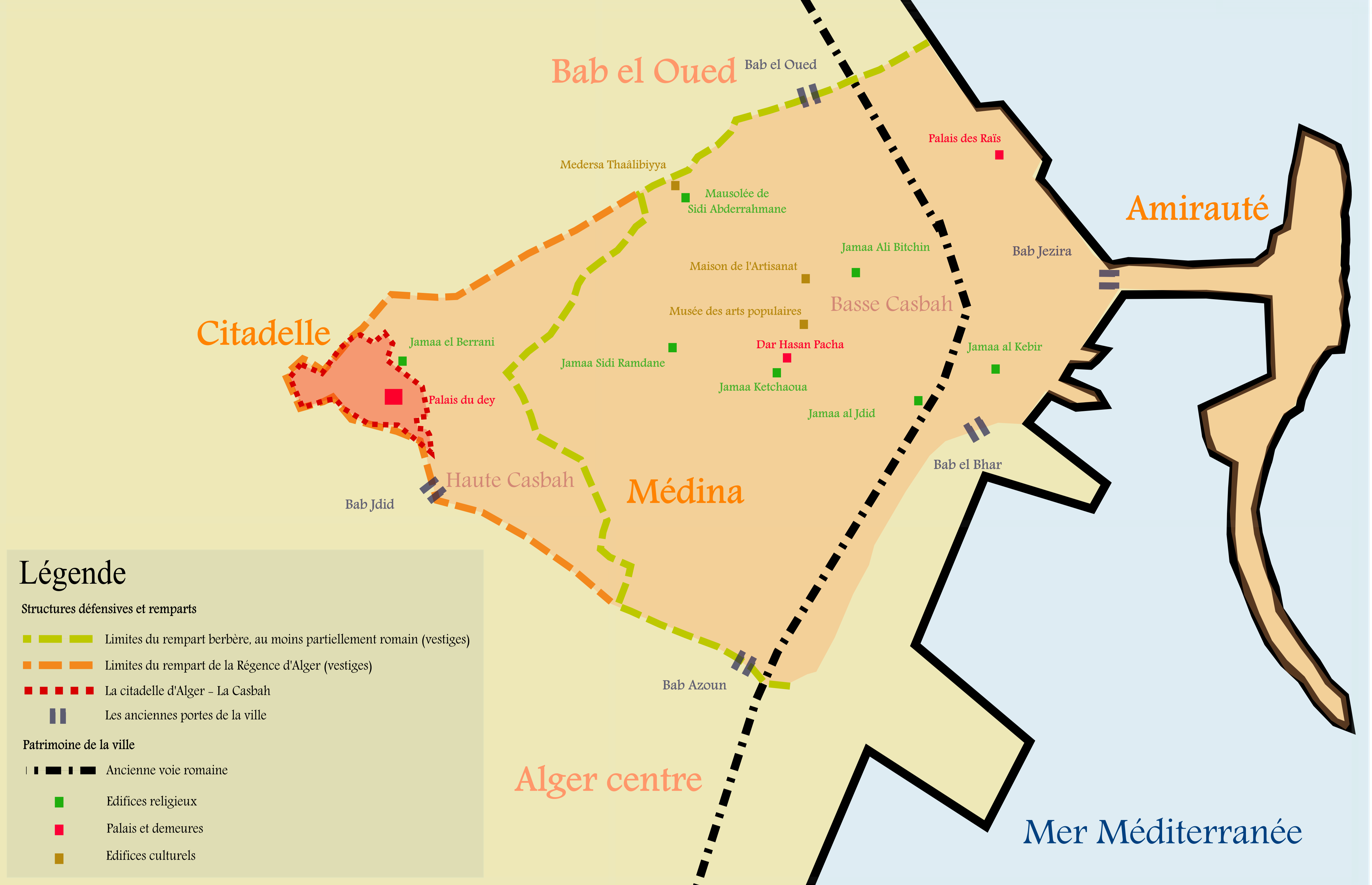
Map of the Algiers Casbah showing what remains of Roman Icosium (in French)

Three bishops are known from antiquity:

- Crescens (Donatist bishop attendee at the Council of Carthage (411))
- Lavrentius (Catholic bishop attendee at Council of Carthage (419))
- Victor (Catholic bishop fl.484)

The titular bishops, all of the episcopal (lowest) rank, were:

- Manuel Tercero Rozas, OESA (26 November 1727 – 4 July 1752)
- Aloisio Gandolfi, CM (8 November 1815 – 25 August 1825)
- Saint Bishop Eugène-Charles-Joseph de Mazenod, OMI (1 October 1832 – 2 October 1837)
