= Aïn Oussera Province =

Aïn Oussera Province ولاية عين وسارة ⴰⴳⴻⵣⴷⵓ ⵏ ⵄⵉⵏ ⵡⴻⵙⵙⴰⵔⴰ
- Province
- Map of Aïn Oussera Province
- Coordinates: 35°26′56″N 2°54′16″E
- Country: Algeria
- Created: 2026
- Capital: Aïn Oussera

Area
  - Total: 6,300 km^{2} (2,400 sq mi)

Population (2008)
  - Total: 251,038
  - Density: 40/km^{2} (100/sq mi)
- Time zone: UTC+01 (CET)
- Area code: +213
- ISO 3166 code: DZ-65
- Districts: 4
- Municipalities: 10

Aïn Oussera Province (Arabic: ولاية عين وسارة) is a province (wilaya) in Algeria, with Aïn Oussera as its provincial capital. It was created in 2026 by separation from Djelfa Province.

The province is located in the transitional zone between the densely populated north and the sparsely populated south and covers an area of about 6,300 km². Around 251,000 people lived in the province at the 2008 census; its population density is therefore about 40 inhabitants per square kilometre.

== Administrative divisions ==
The wilaya of Aïn Oussera is divided into 10 communes, grouped into 4 districts (daïras).

Daïras	Communes		
Daïras	Name	Pop. 2008	ONS code
Aïn Oussera	Aïn Oussera	101,239	1731
Aïn Oussera	Guernini	4,594	1721
Birine	Birine	30,913	1708
Birine	Benhar	17,207	1732
Sidi Ladjel	Sidi Ladjel	13,661	1719
Sidi Ladjel	El Khemis	5,405	1711
Sidi Ladjel	Hassi Fedoul	13,171	1733
Had Sahary	Had Sahary	30,451	1720
Had Sahary	Bouira Lahdab	10,993	1709
Had Sahary	Aïn Fekka	23,404	1735
