= Messaad Province =

Messaad Province ولاية مسعد ⴰⴳⴻⵣⴷⵓ ⵏ ⵎⴻⵙⵄⴻⴷ
- Province
- Map of Messaad Province
- Coordinates: 34°10′00″N 3°30′00″E
- Country: Algeria
- Created: 2026
- Capital: Messaad

Area
  - Total: 15,300 km^{2} (5,900 sq mi)

Population (2008)
  - Total: 220,069
  - Density: 14.4/km^{2} (37.3/sq mi)
- Time zone: UTC+01 (CET)
- Area code: +213
- ISO 3166 code: DZ-66
- Districts: 2
- Municipalities: 8

Messaad Province (Arabic: ولاية مسعد, romanized: Wilāyat Massʿad) is a province (wilaya) in Algeria, with Messaad as its provincial capital. It was created in 2026 by separation from Djelfa Province.

The province lies in the transition zone between the densely populated north and the sparsely populated south and covers an area of about 15,300 km². Around 220,000 people lived in the province at the 2008 census, giving it a population density of about 14 inhabitants per square kilometre.

== Administrative divisions ==
The wilaya of Messaad is divided into 8 communes, grouped into 2 districts (daïras).

Daïras	Communes	
Daïras	Name	Pop. 2008
Messaad	Messaad	102,453
Messaad	Sed Rahal	13,693
Messaad	Guettara	9,926
Messaad	Selmana	19,471
Messaad	Deldoul	11,230
Faïdh El Botma	Faïdh El Botma	32,501
Faïdh El Botma	Oum Laadham	23,051
Faïdh El Botma	Amourah	7,744
