= Aïn El Ibil District =

Coordinates: 34.3500°N 3.2167°E

- District
- Interactive map of Aïn El Ibil District
- Country: Algeria
- Province: Djelfa Province
- Time zone: UTC+1 (CET)

Aïn El Ibil District is a district of Djelfa Province, Algeria.

The district is further divided into 4 municipalities:

- Aïn El Ibel
- Mouadjebara
- Tadmit
- Zaccar
