= Messaâd District =

Coordinates: 34.1542°N 3.4969°E

- District
- Interactive map of Messaâd District
- Country: Algeria
- Province: Djelfa Province
- Time zone: UTC+1 (CET)

Messaâd District is one of the districts of Djelfa Province, Algeria.

== Municipalities ==
The district is further divided into 5 municipalities:

- Messaâd
- Deldoud
- Selmana
- Sed Rahal
- Guettara
