= Hassi Bahbah District =

Coordinates: 35.0708°N 3.0297°E

- District
- Interactive map of Hassi Bahbah District
- Country: Algeria
- Province: Djelfa Province
- Time zone: UTC+1 (CET)

Hassi Bahbah District is a district of Djelfa Province, Algeria.

== Municipalities ==
The district is further divided into 4 municipalities:

- Hassi Bahbah
- Zaafrane
- Hassi El Euch
- Aïn Maabed
