= Vehicle registration plates of Algeria =

Algeria
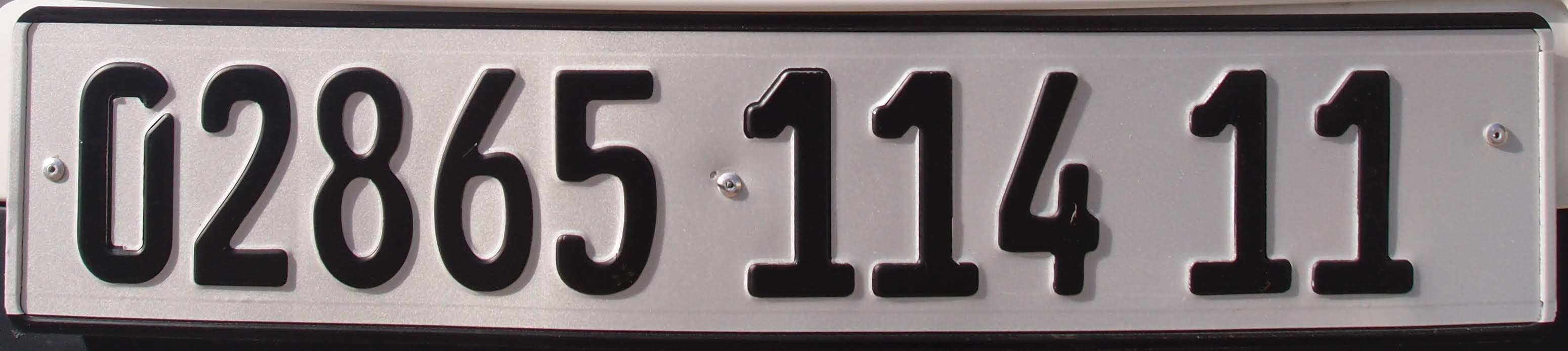
- Front plate of a private car

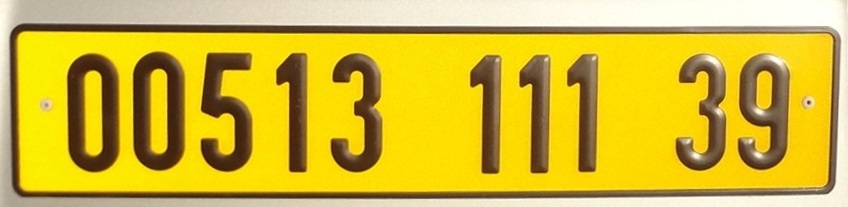
- Rear plate of a private car
- Country: Algeria
- Country code: DZ

Current series
- Size: 520 mm × 110 mm 20.5 in × 4.3 in
- Serial format: Not standard
- Colour (front): Black on white
- Colour (rear): Black on yellow
- Introduced: 2009

Algerian registration plates are manufactured according to the same standards as their French counterparts (prior to 2009), using the same font and dimensions – although there has been a recent tendency to apply custom typefaces (Impact and Century Gothic are commonly used).

== Standard plates ==
Standard issue plates are white with black digits (affixed to the front of the vehicle) and yellow with black digits (mounted onto the rear of the vehicle). Being composed solely of numbers, they are one of the few vehicle registration plates which can accurately be referred to as 'number plates'.

Example of front and rear plates on a private vehicle manufactured in 2026, and registered in Blida

02639-126-09

02639-126-09

Example of front and rear plates on a private vehicle manufactured in 2025, and registered in Bouïra

76739-125-10

76739-125-10

Example of front and rear plates on a private vehicle manufactured in 2020, and registered in Bordj Bou Arréridj Wilaya

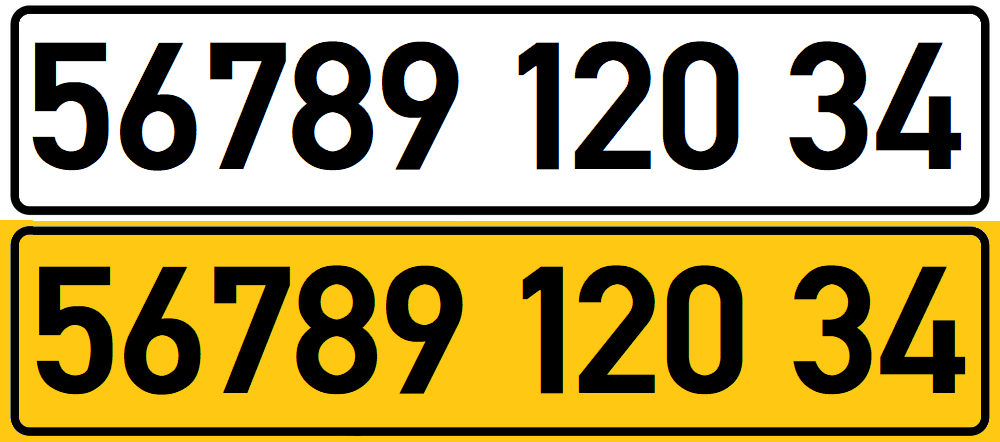

The registration mark takes the form of three groups of digits separated by a space (early plates were separated with a hyphen). Since the late-1990s, the first group of numbers is composed of 5 digits (including leading zeroes – earlier plates have up to three digits with no leading zeroes), which make up the vehicle's actual registration/serial number.

=== Vehicle class ===
The first digit in the 3-digit group indicates the class of the vehicle in accordance with the following list:

1. Private vehicles
2. Trucks
3. Commercial vehicles
4. Buses
5. Tractor units
6. Other tractors
7. Special vehicles
8. Trailers
9. Motorcycles

The last two digits in the 3-digit group indicate the year in which the vehicle was manufactured. For example: 115 would indicate a private vehicle manufactured in 2015; 498 would indicate a bus manufactured in 1998; 903 would indicate a motorcycle manufactured in 2003; &c. Where the year of manufacture was unknown, the arbitrary number 22 was assigned (e.g. 122 for a private vehicle). In December 2022, this number has been replaced with 33 to avoid conflict with regular registrations for vehicles manufactured in 2022.

=== Wilayas ===
A two-digit suffix on the plate identifies the wilaya (Arabic: ولاية) or province in which the vehicle was first registered. Initially there were 48 such wilayas. In January 2022, 10 new wilayas created in December 2019 received their own registration codes. In January 2027, 11 new wilayas created in November 2025, will receive their own registration codes, for a total of 69 codes.

Code	Wilaya	Code	Wilaya		
01	Adrar	24	Guelma	47	Ghardaïa
02	Chlef	25	Constantine	48	Relizane
03	Laghouat	26	Médéa	49	Timimoun
04	Oum El Bouaghi	27	Mostaganem	50	Bordj Badji Mokhtar
05	Batna	28	M'Sila	51	Ouled Djellal
06	Béjaïa	29	Mascara	52	Béni Abbès
07	Biskra	30	Ouargla	53	In Salah
08	Béchar	31	Oran	54	In Guezzam
09	Blida	32	El Bayadh	55	Touggourt
10	Bouïra	33	Illizi	56	Djanet
11	Tamanrasset	34	Bordj Bou Arréridj	57	El M'Ghair
12	Tébessa	35	Boumerdès	58	El Menia
13	Tlemcen	36	El Tarf	59	Aflou
14	Tiaret	37	Tindouf	60	Barika
15	Tizi Ouzou	38	Tissemsilt	61	El Kantara
16	Algiers	39	El Oued	62	Bir El Ater
17	Djelfa	40	Khenchela	63	El Aricha
18	Jijel	41	Souk Ahras	64	Ksar Chellala
19	Sétif	42	Tipaza	65	Aïn Oussera
20	Saïda	43	Mila	66	Messaad
21	Skikda	44	Aïn Defla	67	Ksar El Boukhari
22	Sidi Bel Abbès	45	Naâma	68	Bousaâda
23	Annaba	46	Aïn Témouchent	69	El Abiodh Sidi Cheikh

In November 2022, the Algerian government approved a draft executive decree for the introduction of a single national vehicle registration number, which is currently in the "final stages of the process".

=== Specifications ===
Front plates must be white in colour, whilst rear plates must be yellow, and the digits must always be black. All other colours are unacceptable and can result in a fine. Regular registration plates consist of a single line of digits. The length of these plates is specified as being between 455 and 520 mm, with a height between 100 and 110 mm. The height of the digits must be 75 mm. The digit 1 is to have a width of 20 mm, and all other digits a width of 30 mm. Numbers are to be uniformly separated by a space of 10 mm.

Registration plates featuring two lines of digits are also permissible. These plates have a width of 275 mm, and a height of 200 mm. The rest of the specifications are the same as for single-line plates.

Motorcycle plates have a width of 140 mm, and a height of 120 mm, with the digits printed on two lines. The dimensions of the digits are smaller than those found on regular plates: 45 mm in height, and 26 mm in width – the digit 1 which must be 15 mm wide.

== Special plates ==
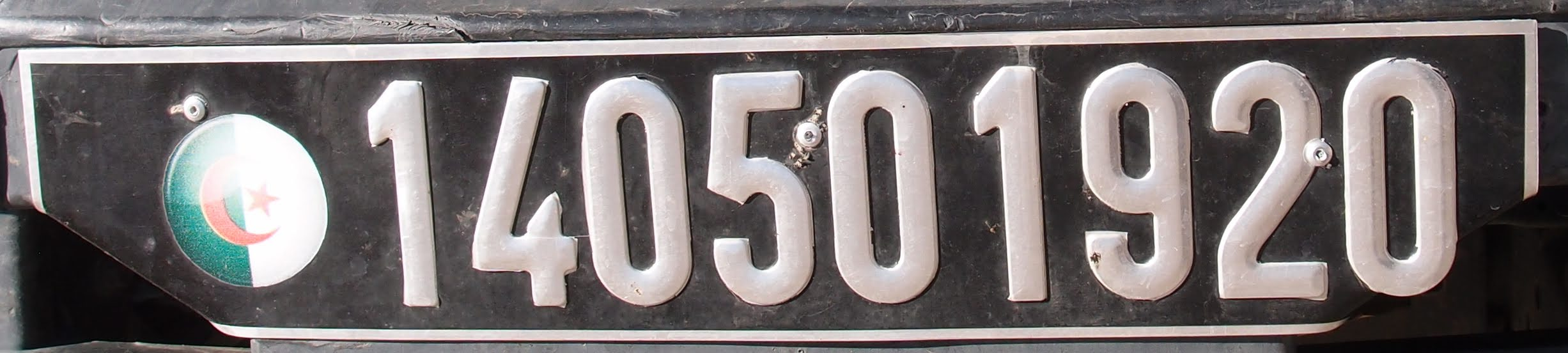
Algerian army registration plate

Diplomatic vehicles are issued with plates featuring three groups of black digits, separated by hyphens, on a light teal background. The first group are the vehicle's actual registration/serial number (up to 3 digits in length); the second is composed of two digits indicating whether the vehicle belongs to a diplomat or embassy staff. The final two digits identify the embassy itself (e.g. 27 for Italy; 37 for Norway, &c.)

Example of front and rear plates on a diplomatic vehicle belonging to the Italian embassy

558-66-27

558-66-27
