= El Idrissia District =

Coordinates: 34.4500°N 2.5333°E

- District
- Interactive map of El Idrissia District
- Country: Algeria
- Province: Djelfa Province
- Time zone: UTC+1 (CET)

El Idrissia District is a district of Djelfa Province, Algeria.

== Municipalities ==
The district is further divided into 3 municipalities:

- El Idrissia
- Douis
- Aïn Chouhada
