= Dar Chioukh District =

Coordinates: 34.9000°N 3.4833°E

- District
- Interactive map of Dar Chioukh District
- Country: Algeria
- Province: Djelfa Province
- Time zone: UTC+1 (CET)

Dar Chioukh District is a district of Djelfa Province, Algeria.

== Municipalities ==
The district is further divided into 3 municipalities:

- Dar Chioukh
- Mouilha
- Sidi Baizid
