= Sidi Ladjel District =

Coordinates: 35.4333°N 2.5000°E

- District
- Interactive map of Sidi Ladjel District
- Country: Algeria
- Province: Djelfa Province
- Time zone: UTC+1 (CET)

Sidi Ladjel District is a district of Djelfa Province, Algeria.

== Municipalities ==
The district is further divided into 3 municipalities:

- Sidi Ladjel
- El Khemis
- Hassi Fedoul
