= Had Sahary District =

- District
- Interactive map of Had Sahary District
- Coordinates: 35.3517°N 3.3609°E
- Country: Algeria
- Province: Djelfa Province
- Time zone: UTC+1 (CET)

Had Sahary District is a district of Djelfa Province, Algeria.

== Municipalities ==
The district is further divided into 3 municipalities:

- Had-Sahary
- Bouira Lahdab
- Aïn Feka
