= Faidh El Botma District =

Coordinates: 34.5278°N 3.7819°E

- District
- Interactive map of Faidh El Botma District
- Country: Algeria
- Province: Djelfa Province
- Time zone: UTC+1 (CET)

Faidh El Botma District is a district of Djelfa Province, Algeria.

== Municipalities ==
The district is further divided into 3 municipalities:

- Faidh El Botma
- Amourah
- Oum Laadham
