= Charef District =

Coordinates: 34.6180°N 2.8010°E

- District
- Interactive map of Charef District
- Country: Algeria
- Province: Djelfa Province
- Time zone: UTC+1 (CET)

Charef District is a district of Djelfa Province, Algeria.

== Municipalities ==
The district is further divided into 3 municipalities:

- Charef
- El Guedid
- Beni Yagoub
