= Aïn Oussera District =

Coordinates: 35.4489°N 2.9044°E

- District
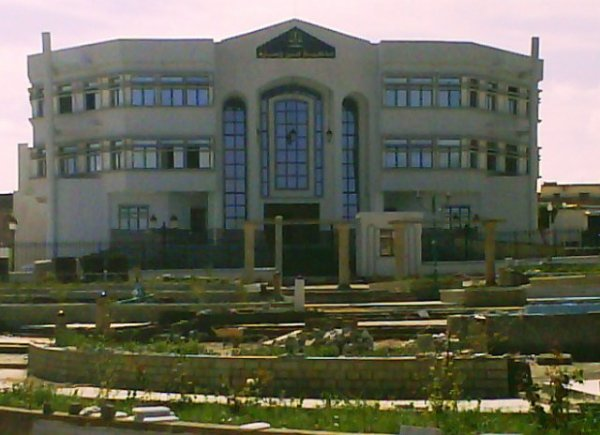
- Courthouse of Aïn Oussera, Algeria
- Interactive map of Aïn Oussera District
- Country: Algeria
- Province: Djelfa Province
- Time zone: UTC+1 (CET)

Aïn Oussera District is a district of Djelfa Province, Algeria.

== Municipalities ==
The district is further divided into 2 municipalities:

- Aïn Oussera
- Guernini
