= Tadmit =

- Commune and town
- Location within Algeria
- Coordinates: 34°17′N 2°59′E
- Country: Algeria
- Province: Djelfa Province

Population (1998)
  - Total: 6,172
- Time zone: UTC+1 (CET)

Tadmit is a small town and commune in Djelfa Province, Algeria. According to the 1998 census it has a population of 6,172. Tadmit is something of a secluded town, although it is located several kilometres southwest of Djelfa. It is accessed via a small road off the N1 Trans-Saharan Highway.

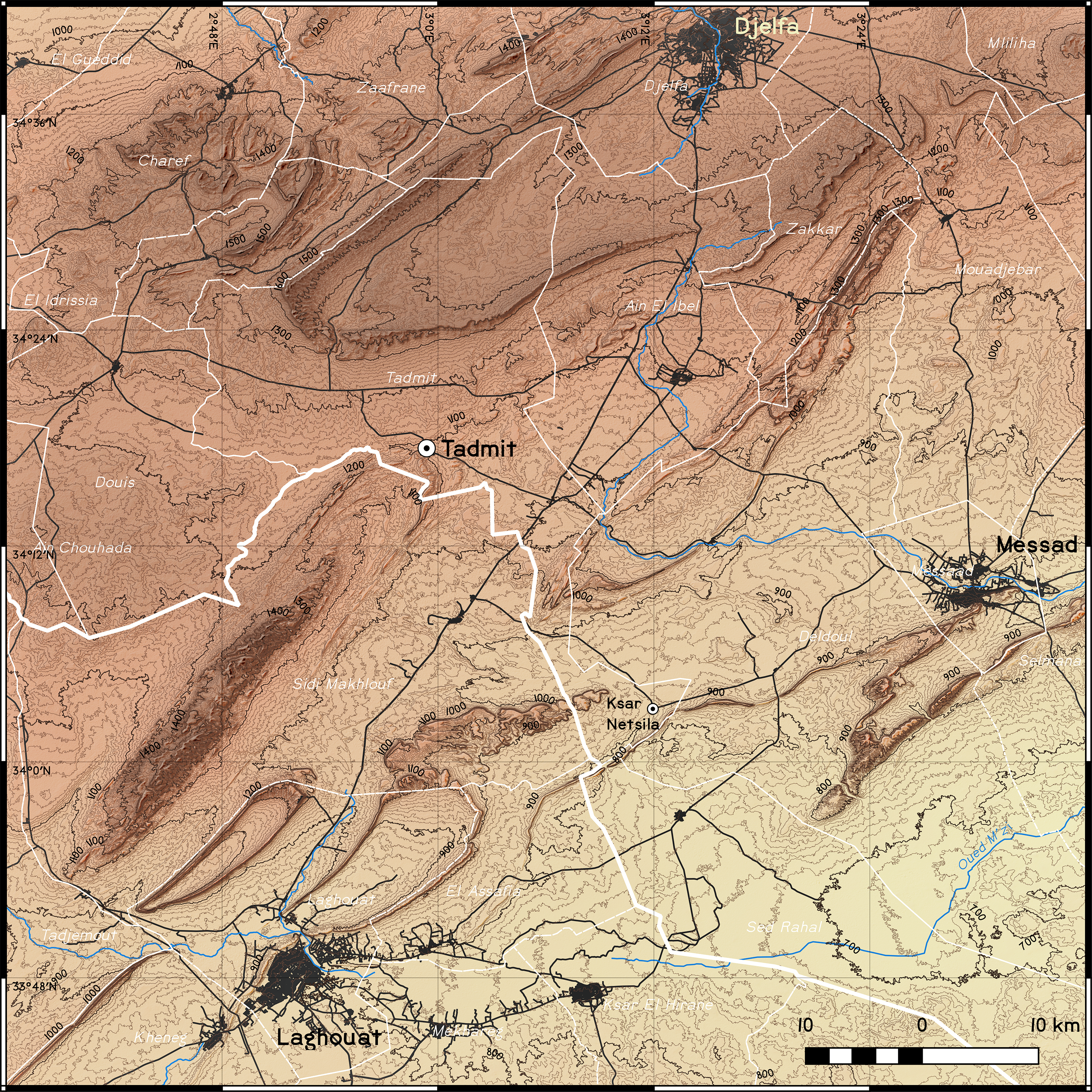
MapTadmit

== History ==
=== Antiquity ===
Guénin, in his "Notice sur les ruines de Tadmit", points out that Tadmit was once a fairly important centre of occupation. The author describes numerous ruins of towns, villages, posts and defensive enclosures - without being able to attribute them to the Romans or the Berbers. There is no characteristic external evidence to establish the origin of the ruins at Tadmit; only the word et Tadmit would indicate by its sound that the Berbers occupied this point. However, as the Romans had established themselves in Messaâd (located in the same valley), and the ruins of Messaâd would resemble those of Tadmit, it would be possible that a Roman colony had come to settle in Tadmit. The remains of the ancient occupation are very visible. On the site of the [former] penitentiary a village was built; on the opposite bank of the 0ued-Tadmit there were traces of a real town. Both would have been stretched out by a real oppidum with a double enclosure wall, and the passes were guarded by reductions or by a kind of tower. Upstream from the bridge on the Takarzane road, there are still traces of isolated constructions; a square enclosure of about 100 metres on each side, and on both banks of the river, posts intended to protect the low-lying area where the inhabitants of the towns had established their crops.

==== Interpretation ====
How are we to interpret the description in Guénin's notes, about which the literature is otherwise almost completely silent? Gsell, in his Atlas Archéologique, mentions shortly in the valley of the Oued Tadmit, on both banks ruins of more or less large settlements; however, there is no evidence that they are of Roman origin.

Despois a well-informed author on the Djebel Amour, categorically denies the existence of any trace of Roman occupation in the massif. In his book, he devotes detailed paragraphs to the description of abandoned Berber villages and ksour, without mentioning any Roman remains. In addition, he highlights the existence of empty square enclosures, which he interprets as cattle sheds, suggesting pastoral activity rather than Roman occupation The photographs he presents in his book show no convincing evidence of a Roman presence. More recently, Morizot was based on aerial photographs. He believes that it is possible to conclude that few, if any, of the sites previously identified as such are Roman or even very ancient. However, the same views seem to confirm the existence of ruins where the ICN map of 1951 indicated them. However, he expressed doubts as to whether they were Roman. He felt that an investigation of the ground would be necessary to settle this question definitively.

On the other hand, the 1951 INC Tadjemout 1:50,000 map provides a detailed list of inhabited ksour, abandoned ksour and numerous megalithic tombs, with four sites specifically marked with the initials RR, reserved for Roman ruins. These clearly identified Roman ruins strongly suggest a Roman presence in the region. These sites include the Castellum Dimmidi to Messad (about 50 km away), Hammam-Charef (also about 50 km away) or Medjedel (about 130 km from Tadmit), all formally identified as Roman.

=== During the french colonisation ===
The town of Tadmit, situated amidst a well-irrigated prairie since at least 1855, was central to the indigenous community of Laghouat's management of the region's water resources. The French, continuing this tradition, undertook irrigation planning, often modifying or repairing existing infrastructure. However, their projects often resulted in tension as water was redirected to new colonization centers, depriving Algerian communities like Tadmit of vital resources. In 1857, French Commandant Marguerite claimed the fertile plains managed by the locals for French use, exemplifying the ongoing colonial appropriation of land and resources in Algeria.

A penitentiary for "natives" was created in 1885, and it was in service at least until 1916, as a prefectoral instruction points out. During the summer of 1908, "a serious epidemic of exanthematic typhus" (65 men affected and 7 deaths out of a total of 103 inmates) raged. According to Sylvie Thénault the penitentiary at Tadmit "was at the top of the hierarchy of hardship"; it was also called "the hell of Jebel-Amour", according to the newspaper Le Radical..

Following a study conducted in 1918 in the Djelfa region, it was decided to set up a sheep breeding station in Tadmit in 1922, in the former penitentiary. The initial flock consisted of 600 animals, which was reduced to 250 by selection. Ten years later, the flock consisted of more than 2200 animals. The station allowed the selection and breeding of the breeds known as "Tadmit" (which is distinguished by the fineness of its wool), the variety known as "Raimbi" and that of "Zahrez".

On 28 October 1952, the Mixed Commune of Djelfa created an airfield at Tadmit. Located 50 kilometres south-south-west of Djelfa, it was authorised for private use and marked by a white cross in the centre of the landing zone.

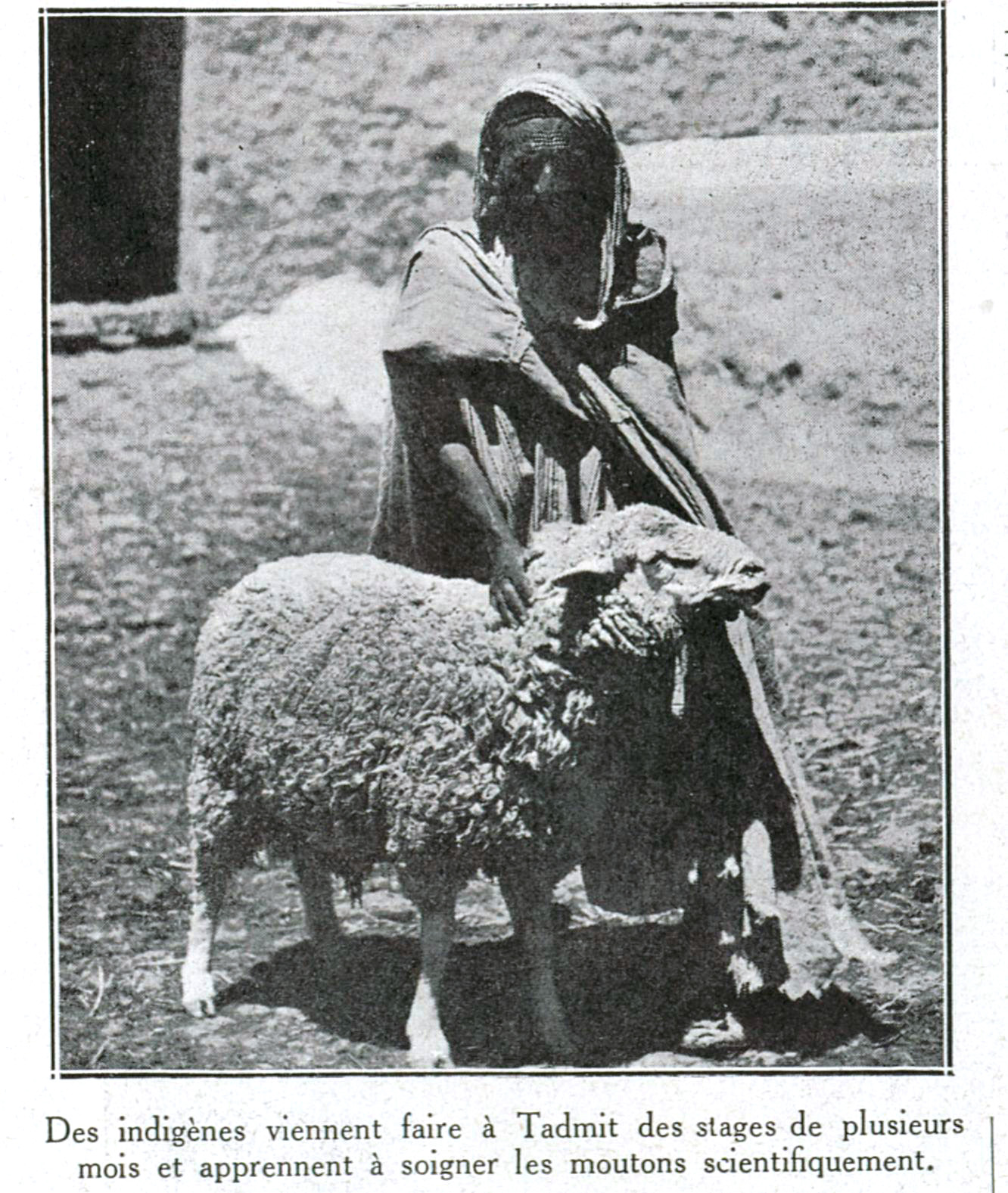
Tadmit sheep breeding station (1927)

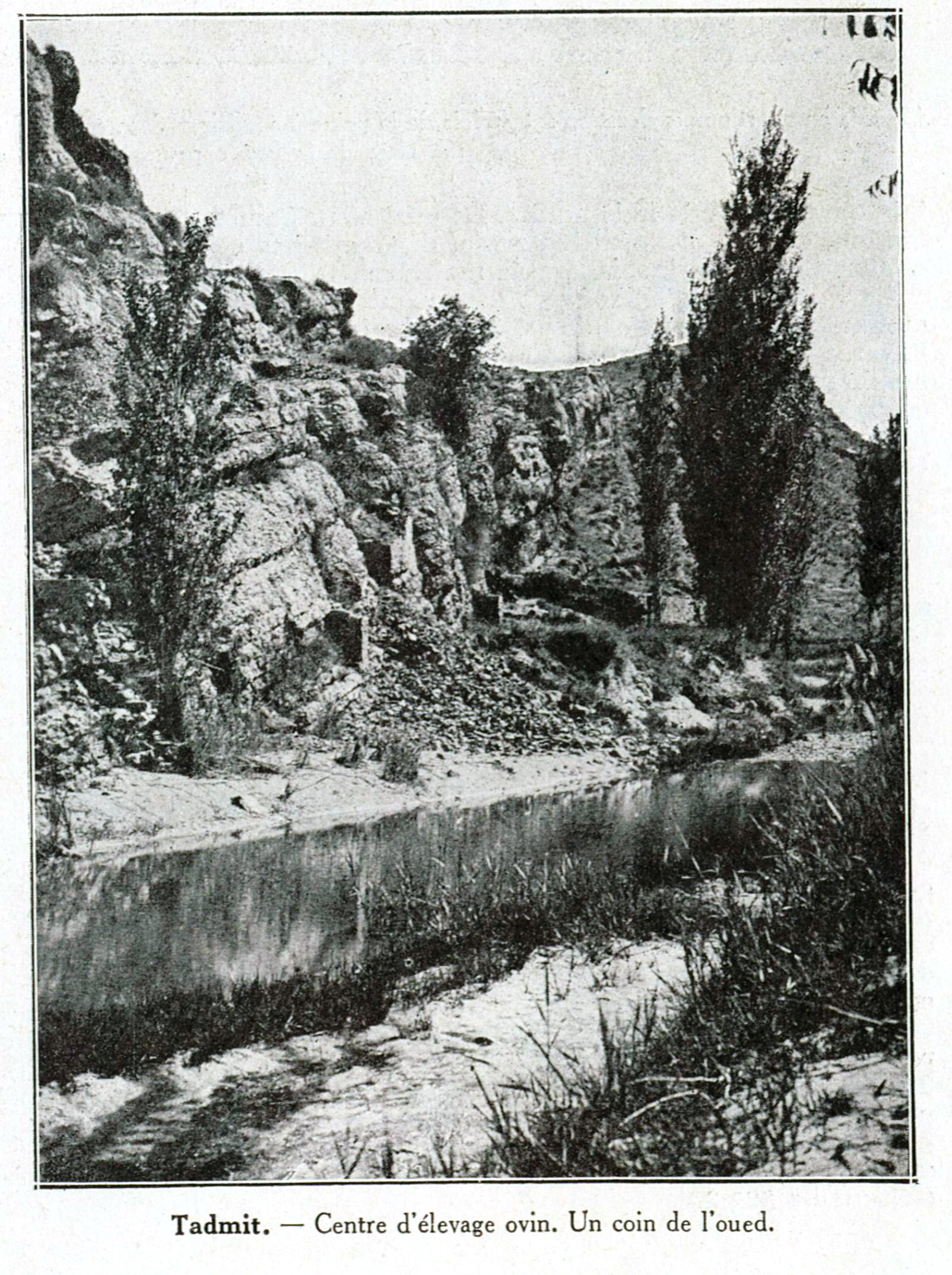
Tadmit sheep breeding station (1927)
