= Charef (disambiguation) =

Charef is a town and commune in Djelfa Province within Algeria.

Charef may refer to:

- Boualem Charef, Algerian football manager
- Charef District, a district of Djelfa Province within Algeria
- Mehdi Abid Charef, Algerian association football referee
- Mehdi Charef (1952–2026), French film director and screenwriter of Algerian descent
- Mohamed Charef, Algerian theologian.
