= Dar Chioukh =

- Commune and town
- Location within Algeria
- Coordinates: 34°54′N 3°29′E
- Country: Algeria
- Province: Djelfa Province

Population (2008)
  - Total: 26,605
- Time zone: UTC+1 (CET)

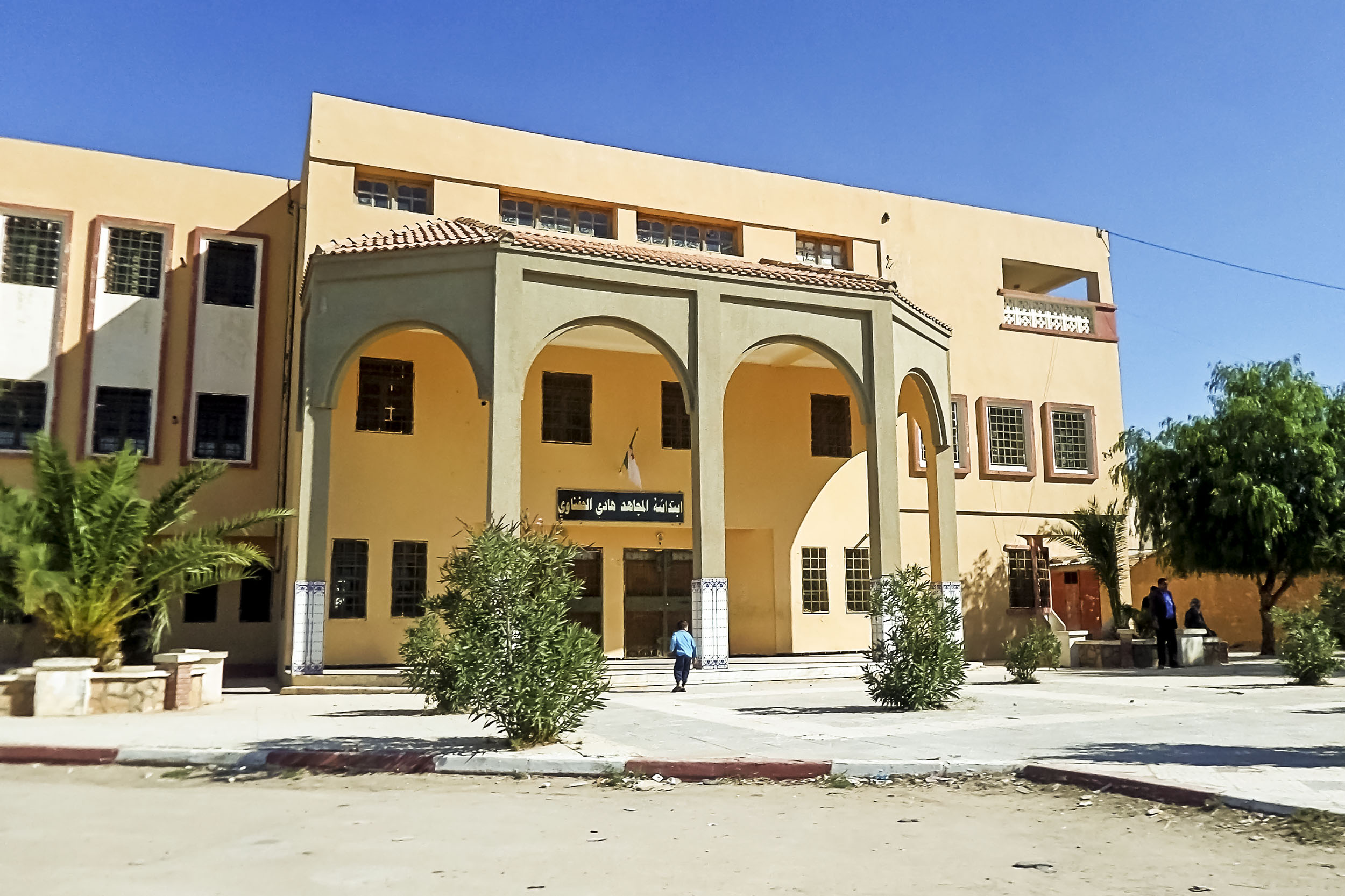

Dar Chioukh is a town and commune in Djelfa Province, Algeria. According to the 2008 census it has a population of 26,605. It is located northeast of Djelfa and north by a smaller road from the N46 from M'Liliha.
