= Benhar =

Benhar may refer to:

- Benhar, Algeria, a town and commune in Djelfa Province, Algeria
- Benhar, New Zealand, a settlement in Otago Region, New Zealand
- A former coal mining area in Scotland, now virtually uninhabited, with two distinct communities at West Benhar south-west of Harthill, and East Benhar north-west of Fauldhouse
