= Ksar Boukhari =

Ksar Boukhari Ksar el oukhari قصر البخاري Boughari
- Commune and town
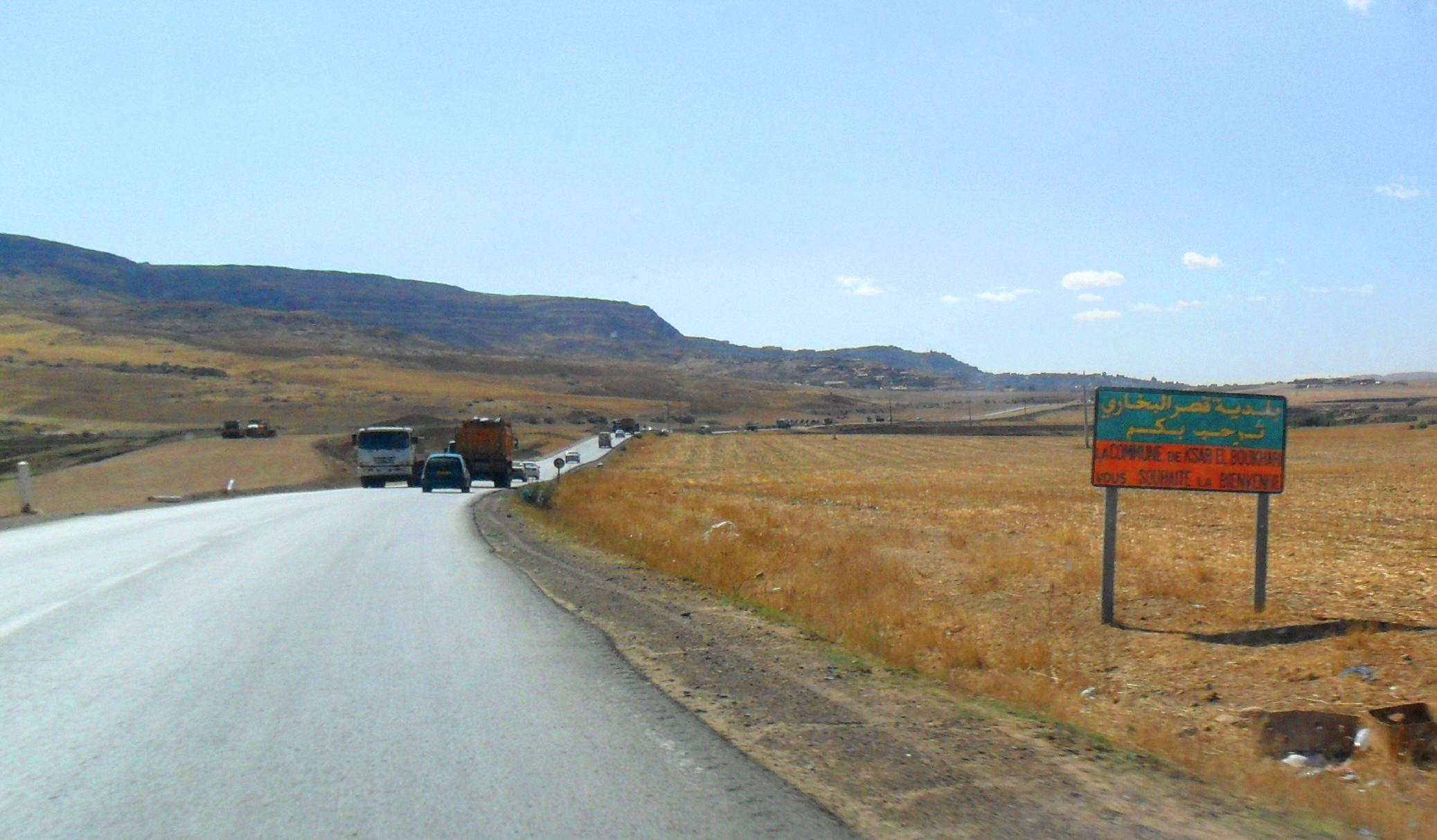
- Nickname: Boughari

- Location within Algeria
- Coordinates: 35°53′8″N 2°45′3″E
- Country: Algeria
- Province: Ksar El Boukhari Province

Population (2008)
  - Total: 67,813
- Time zone: UTC+1 (CET)

Ksar Boukhari is a town and commune in Ksar El Boukhari Province, serving as its provincial capitol. As of the 2008 census, it had a population of 59,634. The town is bordered by woods and the Atlas mountains, and is built on the Chelif river.

The old walled quarter is on a hill overlooking the main modern town. Ksar el-Boukhari is a commercial centre for pastoral peoples of the interior of Algeria, who trade in wool, livestock and cereals. It also supports a local carpet industry.

Immediately northwest is the village and fort of Boghar (Balcon du Sud), a strategic command post.
