= Farzoul =

Village in Algeria

Coordinates: 35°4′33.7″N 3°12′17.5″E

Farzoul (Arabic: فرزول) is an isolated village in Djelfa Province, Algeria, east of Hassi Bahbah. In 2016, it had a population of c. 1,200.
