= Bordj Douis =

- Commune and town
- Location within Algeria
- Coordinates: 34°22′0″N 2°42′8″E
- Country: Algeria
- Province: Djelfa Province

Population (1998)
  - Total: 10,356
- Time zone: UTC+1 (CET)

Bordj Douis or Douis is a small town and commune in Djelfa Province, Algeria. According to the 1998 census it has a population of 10,356. It is located southeast of El Idrissia.
