= Birine District =

Birine District بيرين
- District
- Interactive map of Birine District
- Coordinates: 35°38′N 3°13′E
- Country: Algeria
- Province: Djelfa Province
- Capital: Birine

Area
  - Total: 800 km^{2} (310 sq mi)
- Elevation: 764 m (2,507 ft)

Population (2008 census)
  - Total: 30,913
  - Density: 39/km^{2} (100/sq mi)
- Time zone: UTC+1 (CET)

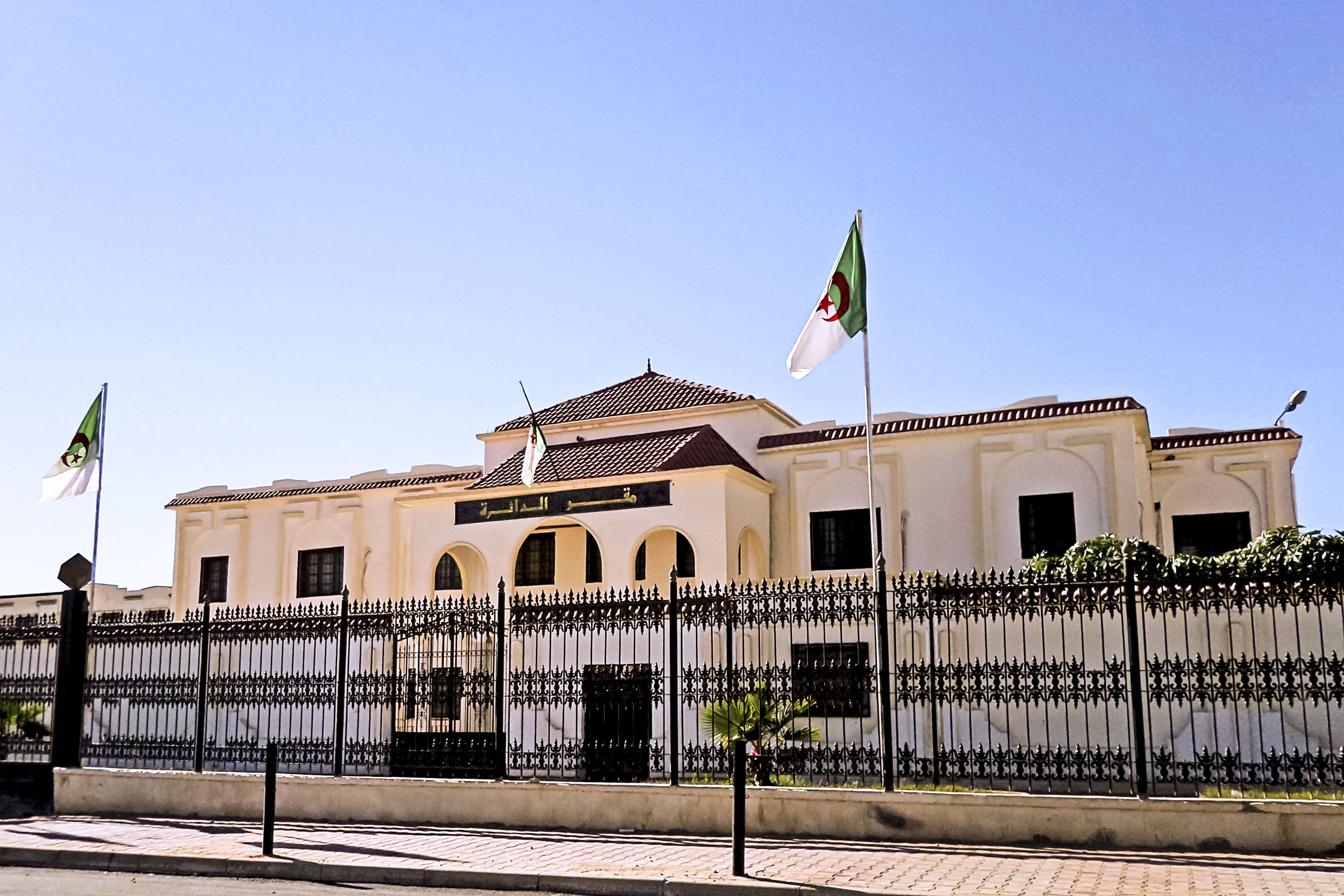

Birine District is a district of Djelfa Province, Algeria.

== Municipalities ==
The district is further divided into 2 municipalities:

- Birine
- Benhar
