= Deldoul =

Deldoul may refer to:

- Deldoul, Adrar, a municipality or commune of Adrar province, Algeria
- Deldoul, Djelfa, a municipality or commune of Djelfa province, Algeria
