= List of Algerian regions by Human Development Index =

This is a list of regions of Algeria by Human Development Index as of 2025 with data for the year 2023.

Rank	Region (Provinces)	HDI (2023)
High human development
1	North Center (Algiers, Blida, Boumerdès, Tipaza, Bouïra, Médéa, Tizi Ouzou, Béjaïa, Chlef, Aïn Defla)	0.784
–	Algeria	0.763
2	North East (Annaba, Constantine, Skikda, Jijel, Mila, Souk Ahras, El Taref, Guelma)	0.760
3	South (Bechar, Tindouf, Adrar, Ghardaïa, Biskra, El Oued, Ouargla, Tamanrasset, Illizi)	0.755
4	North West (Oran, Tlemcen, Mostaganem, Aïn Témouchent, Relizane, Sidi Bel Abbès, Mascara)	0.754
5	Hauts Plateaux East (Sétif, Batna, Khenchela, Bordj Bou Arréridj, Oum el-Bouaghi, Tébessa)	0.753
6	Hauts Plateaux West (Tiaret, Saïda, Tissemsilt, Naâma, El Bayadh)	0.748
7	Hauts Plateaux Center (Djelfa, Laghouat, M'Sila)	0.740
