= Amaura =

Amaura may refer to:

- Amourah (also historically known as Amaura), a town and Latin Catholic titular bishopric in Algeria
- Amaura (Pokémon), a Pokemon species
