= Hassi El Euch =

Coordinates: 35°09′11″N 3°14′54″E

- Commune and town
- Interactive map of Hassi El Euch
- Country: Algeria
- Province: Djelfa Province

Population (1998)
  - Total: 10,834
- Time zone: UTC+1 (CET)

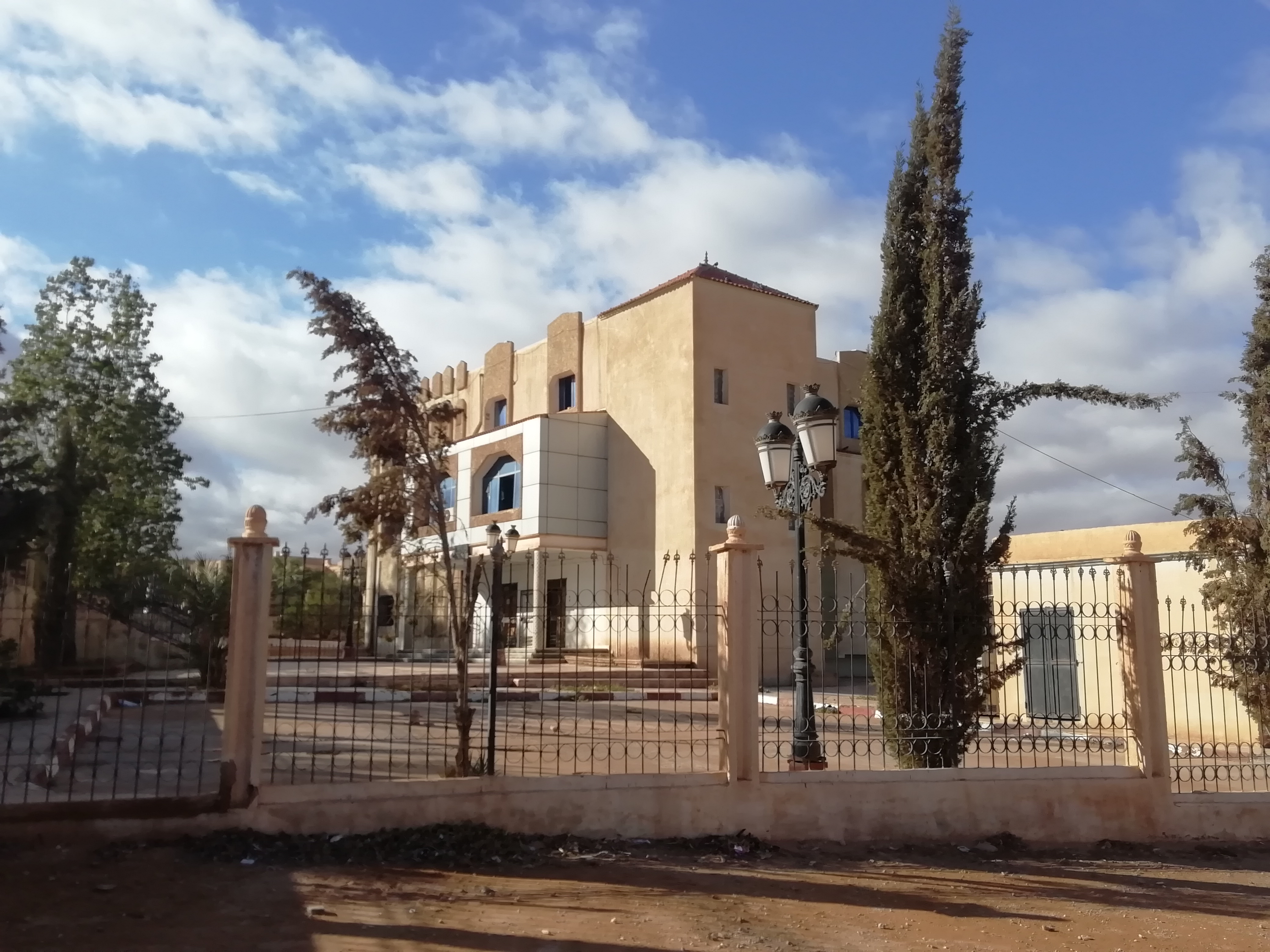
Hassi El Eush Municipality Headquarters

Hassi El Euch is a town and commune in Djelfa Province, Algeria. According to the 1998 census it has a population of 10,834.

== Localities ==
- Farzoul
