= Ksar El Boukhari Province =

Ksar El Boukhari Province ولاية قصر البخاري ⴰⴳⴻⵣⴷⵓ ⵏ ⵇⵚⴻⵔ ⵍⴱⵓⵅⴰⵔⵉ
- Province
- Map of Ksar El Boukhari Province
- Coordinates: 35°53′08″N 2°45′03″E
- Country: Algeria
- Created: 2026
- Capital: Ksar Boukhari

Area
  - Total: 4,700 km^{2} (1,800 sq mi)

Population (2008)
  - Total: 246,920
  - Density: 53/km^{2} (140/sq mi)
- Time zone: UTC+01 (CET)
- Area code: +213
- ISO 3166 code: DZ-26
- Districts: 6
- Municipalities: 21

Ksar El Boukhari Province (Arabic: ولاية قصر البخاري, romanized: Wilāyat Qaṣr al-Bukhārī) is a province (wilaya) in northern Algeria, with Ksar Boukhari as its provincial capital. It was created in 2026 by separation from Médéa Province.

The province lies south of Algiers in the Atlas Mountains and covers an area of about 4,700 km^{2}. Around 247,000 people lived in the province at the 2008 census, giving it a population density of 53 inhabitants per square kilometre.

== Administrative divisions ==
The wilaya of Ksar El Boukhari is divided into 21 communes, grouped into 6 districts (daïras).

Daïras	Communes		
Daïras	Name	Pop. 2008	ONS code
Ksar El Boukhari	Ksar Boukhari	67,813	2635
Ksar El Boukhari	Meftaha	5,908	2649
Ksar El Boukhari	Saneg	3,487	2664
Aïn Boucif	Aïn Boucif	26,042	2604
Aïn Boucif	Ouled Maaref	9,287	2603
Aïn Boucif	Kef Lakhdar	4,403	2617
Aïn Boucif	Sidi Damed	5,009	2631
Aïn Boucif	El Ouinet	4,186	2657
Chelalet El Adhaoura	Chelalet El Adhaoura	27,300	2618
Chelalet El Adhaoura	Tafraout	8,901	2623
Chelalet El Adhaoura	Cheniguel	6,866	2640
Chelalet El Adhaoura	Aïn Ouksir	5,071	2641
El Azizia	El Azizia	10,765	2632
El Azizia	Derrag	7,273	2608
El Azizia	Oum El Djallil	3,625	2642
Chahbounia	Chahbounia	13,617	2638
Chahbounia	Bou Aïche	8,873	2610
Chahbounia	Boughezoul	16,939	2651
Ouled Antar	Ouled Antar	2,216	2658
Ouled Antar	Ouled Hellal	3,367	2622
Ouled Antar	Boghar	5,972	2625
