= El Guedid =

- Commune and town
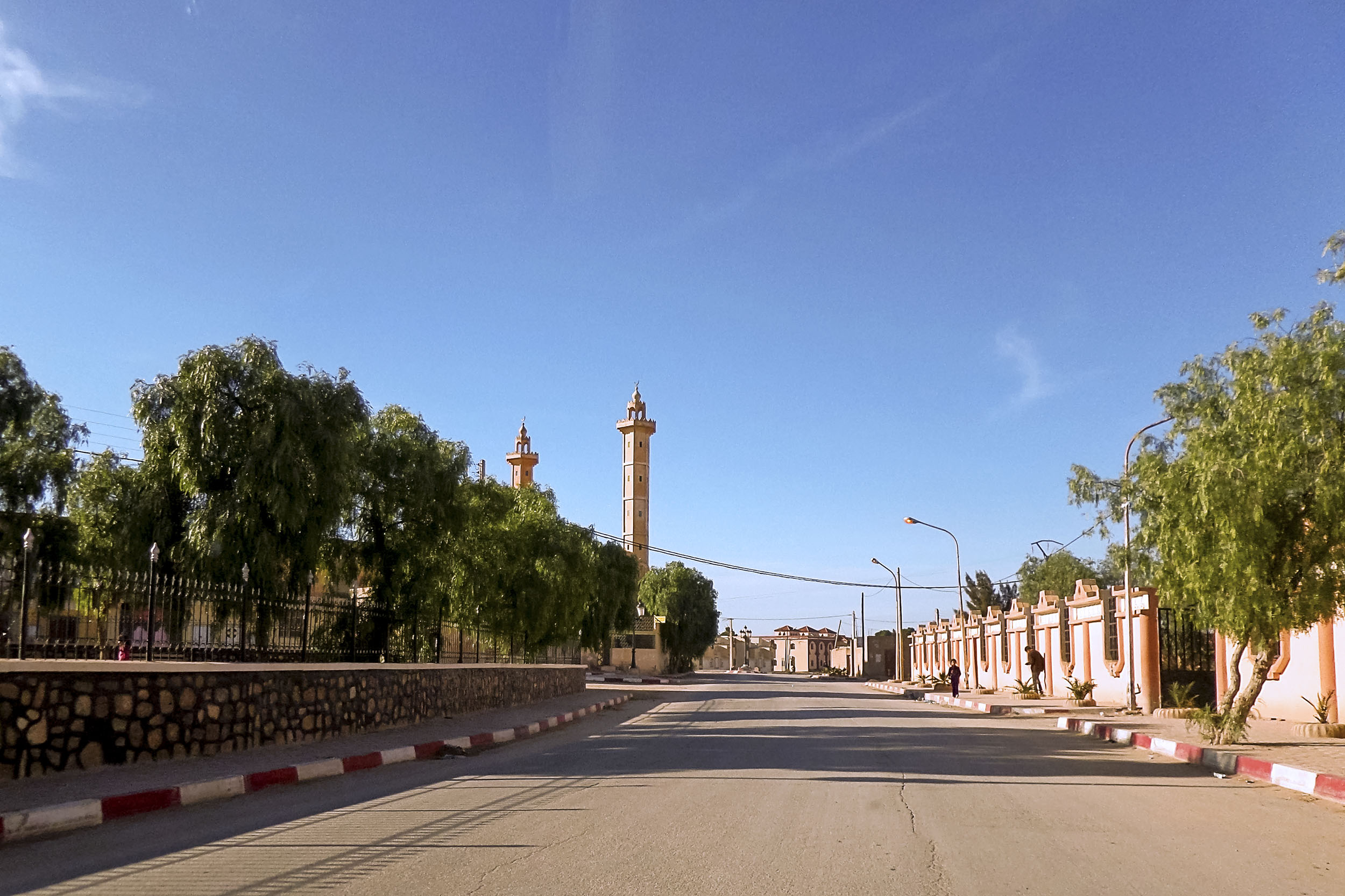

- Location within Algeria
- Country: Algeria
- Province: Djelfa Province

Population (1998)
  - Total: 11,059
- Time zone: UTC+1 (CET)

El Guedid is a town and commune in Djelfa Province, Algeria. According to the 1998 census it has a population of 11,059.
