= Zaccar =

Coordinates: 34°25′51″N 3°19′38″E

- Commune and town
- Location of Zaccar in Djelfa.
- Country: Algeria
- Province: Djelfa Province

Population (1998)
  - Total: 3,142
- Time zone: UTC+1 (CET)

Zaccar is a town and commune in Djelfa Province, Algeria. In the 2008 census, its population was recorded as 1,809.

== Archaeology ==
The prehistoric rock art site of Zaccar is located roughly about 2 km away from Deir al-Daqourin (or Dir Deggaouine). The site was first documented in 1907 by a French magistrate and declared a national heritage site in 1982, it features Neolithic rock arts and paintings. The panels include painting diagrams of an antelope pursued by a lion, alongside engravings of elephants, ostriches, rhinoceroses, and human figures.
