= Cheniguel =

- Commune and town
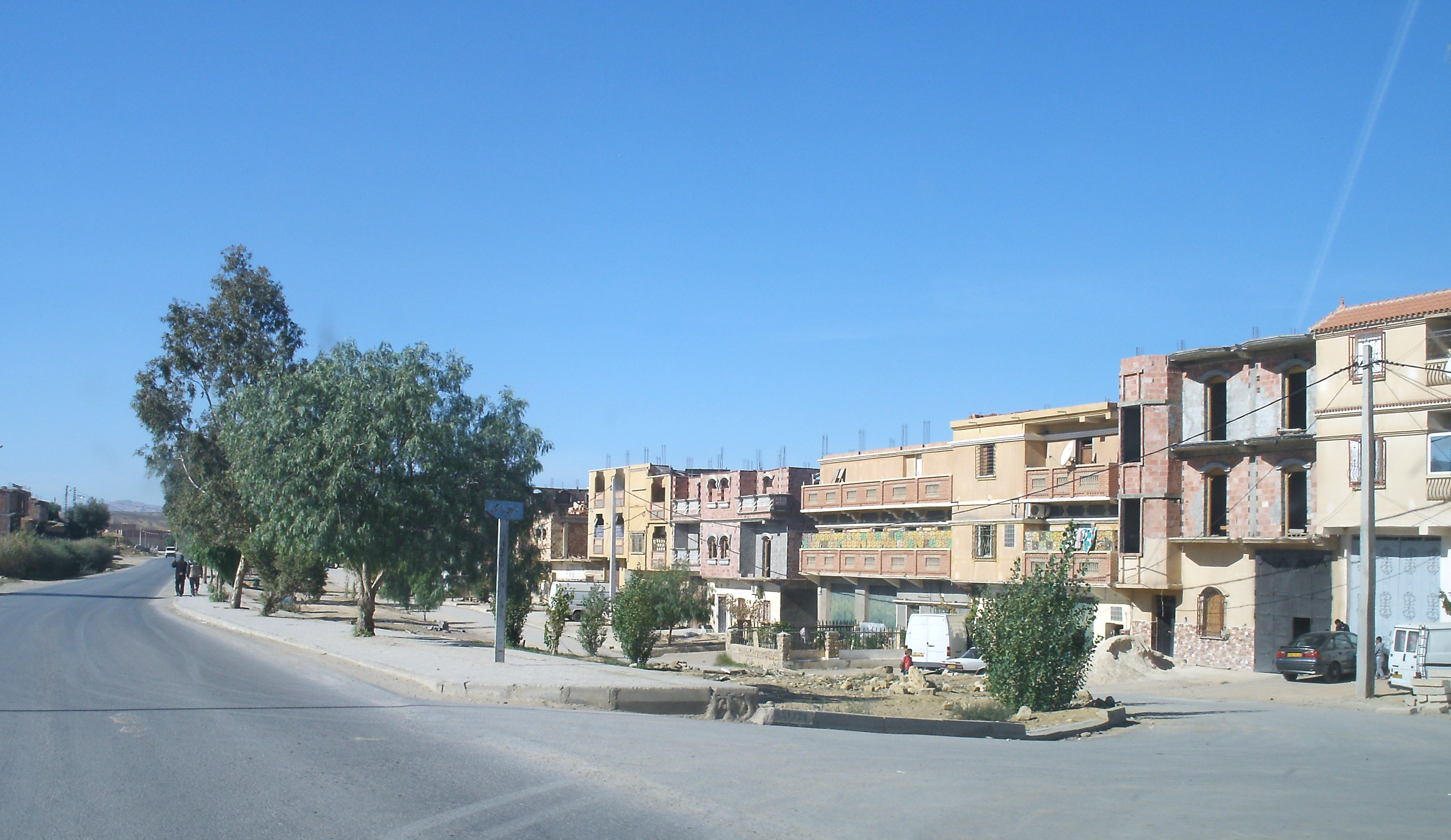

- Location within Algeria
- Coordinates: 35°55′20″N 3°34′00″E
- Country: Algeria
- Province: Médéa Province
- District: Chellalet El Adhaoura District

Population (1998)
  - Total: 5,734
- Time zone: UTC+1 (CET)

Cheniguel (Arabic: شنيقل) is a town and commune in Médéa Province, Algeria. According to the 1998 census, it had a population of 5,734. 10 years later it had a population of 6,866.
