= Selmana =

- Commune and town
- Location within Algeria
- Coordinates: 34°11′N 3°36′E
- Country: Algeria
- Province: Djelfa Province

Population (1998)
  - Total: 14,008
- Time zone: UTC+1 (CET)

Selmana is a small town and commune in Djelfa Province, Algeria, located in the south-eastern outskirts of Messaâd. According to the 1998 census it has a population of 14,008.
