= Saneg =

Coordinates: 35°51′N 2°53′E

- Commune and town
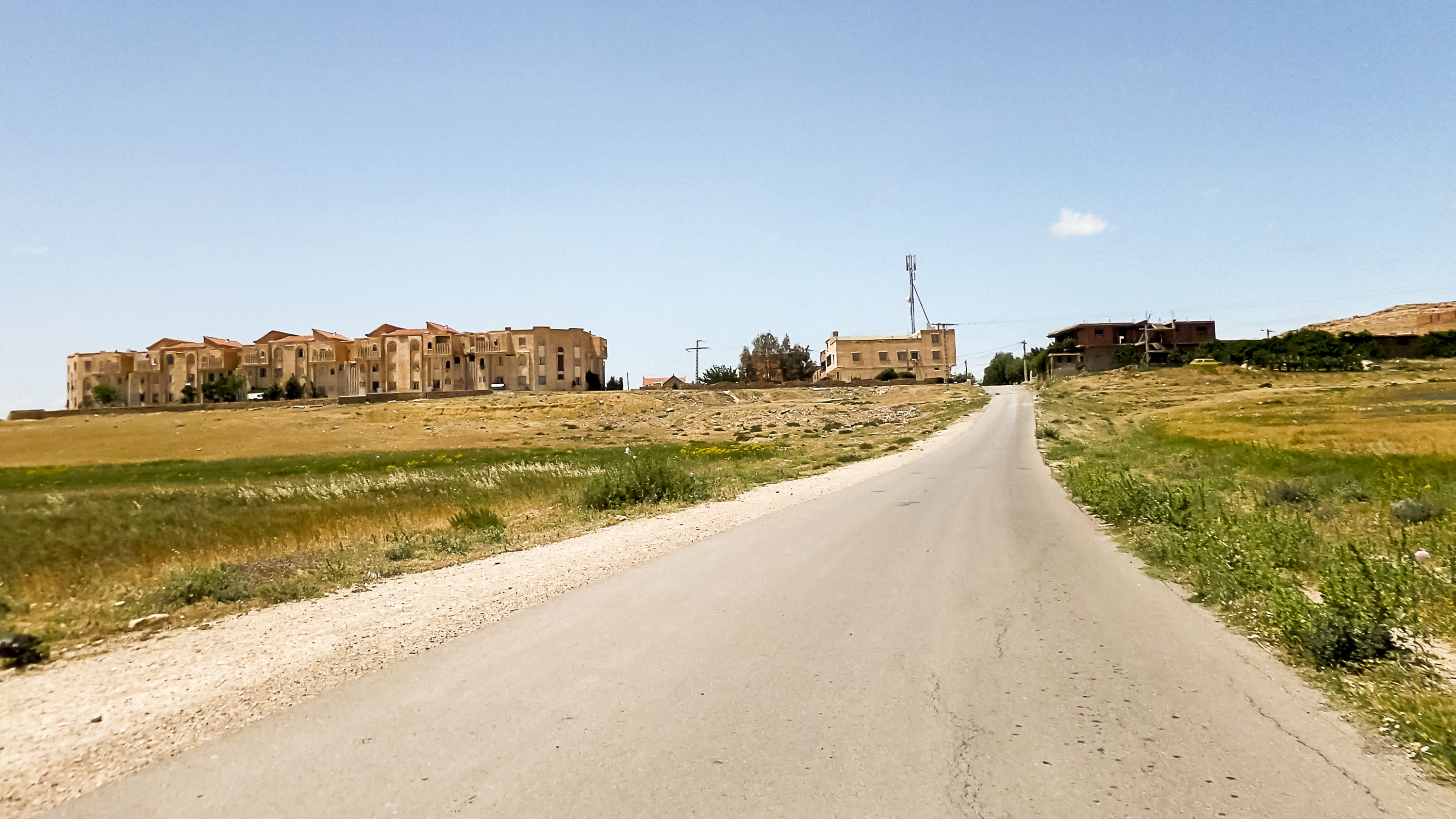
- Saneg
- Interactive map of Saneg
- Country: Algeria
- Province: Médéa Province

Population (1998)
  - Total: 3,120
- Time zone: UTC+1 (CET)

Saneg is a town and commune in Médéa Province, Algeria. According to the 1998 census, it had a population of 3,120.

The Roman town of Uzinaza was located in the area.
