= Birine =

- Commune and town
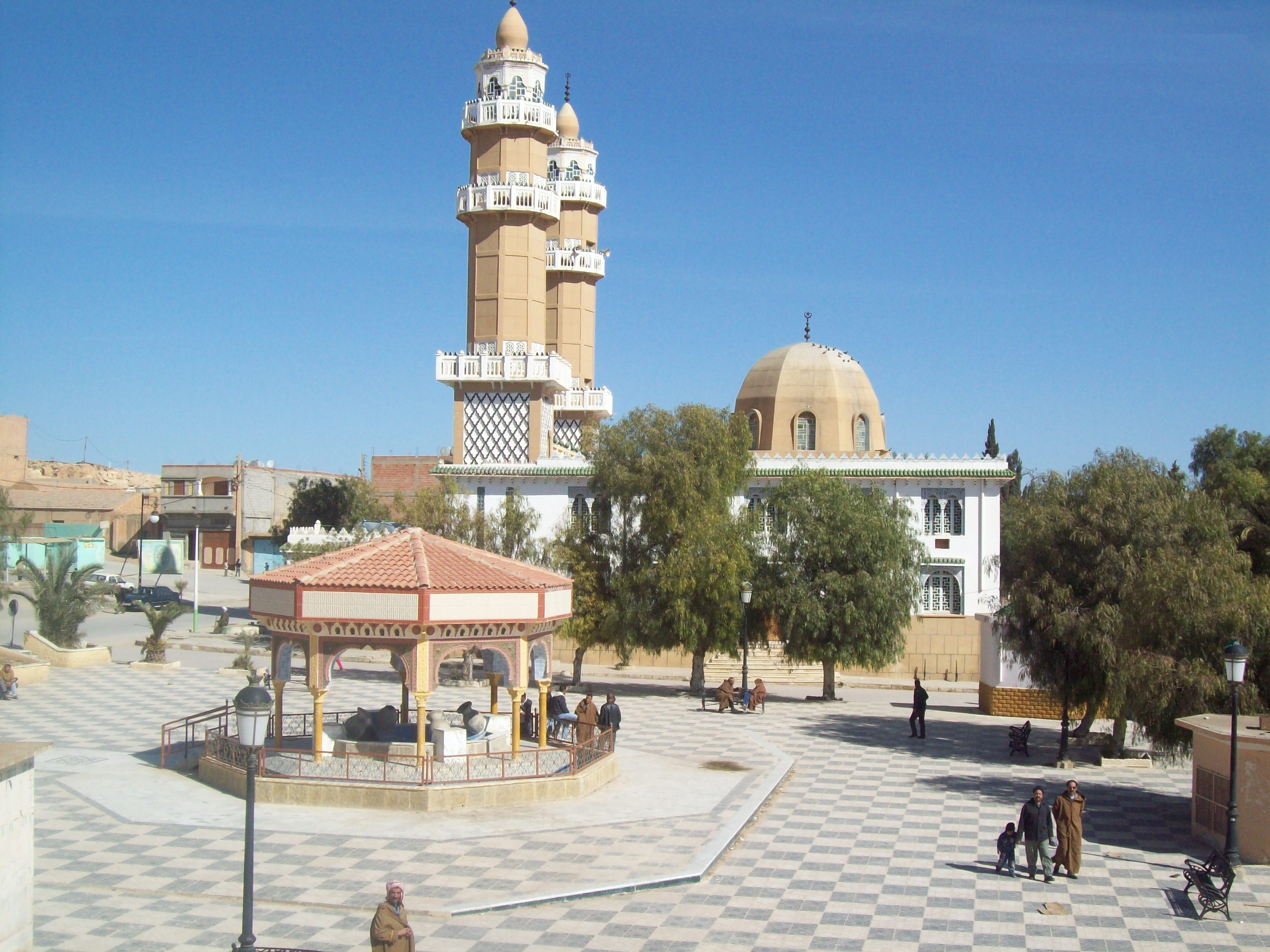

- Location within Algeria
- Coordinates: 35°38′N 3°13′E
- Country: Algeria
- Province: Djelfa Province
- District: Birine District

Population (2008)
  - Total: 26,670
- Time zone: UTC+1 (CET)

Birine is a town and commune in Djelfa Province, Algeria. According to the 2008 census it has a population of 26,670.
