= Aïn El Ibel =

- Commune and town
- Location of Aïn El Ibel within Djelfa Province

- Location of Aïn El Ibel within Algeria
- Coordinates: 34°21′N 3°13′E
- Country: Algeria
- Province: Djelfa Province

Population (1998)
  - Total: 20,436
- Time zone: UTC+1 (CET)

Aïn El Ibel is a town and commune in Djelfa Province, Algeria. According to the 1998 census it has a population of 20,436. The N18 and the N1 Trans Saharan highway connects it to the provincial capital of Djelfa in the northeast. To the southwest of the town are a number of fields in which the inhabitants grow crops.
