= Zaafrane, Algeria =

Coordinates: 34°51′03″N 2°51′25″E

- Commune and town
- Country: Algeria
- Province: Djelfa Province

Population (1998)
  - Total: 12,865
- Time zone: UTC+1 (CET)

Zaafrane, Algeria is a town and commune in Djelfa Province, Algeria. 12,865 people were counted there in the 1998 census.
