= Uzinaza =

Ancient Roman-Berber city situated in present-day Saneg, Algeria

- Location within Algeria
- 35.85°N 2.883333°E
- Location: Algeria
- Region: Médéa Province

Uzinaza was an ancient Roman-Berber city located in present-day Algeria. It is located in the modern commune of Saneg.

== History ==
Uzinaza was founded by Septimius Severus in 205 AD in central-western Numidia. The city contains the ruins of a Roman villa dating back to its founding king, which bore the Latinized Berber name of Usinadis.

The shape of the enclosure of the site is that of an irregular rectangle of 300m in length and 200m in width; it is formed by a wall with two meters thick frame of uncut stones. Some columns, pottery fragments and a sarcophagus are on the same ruins, that are near the small river where stood the destroyed walls.

After the Arab conquest in the early eighth century the city disappeared, and the village of Saneg is now located near to where Uzinaza once was.

== See also ==
- Mauretania Caesariensis
- Icosium
- Altava
- Rapidum
- Rusadir
- Pomaria
