= Sidi Baizid =

Coordinates: 35°45′N 2°23′E

- Commune and town
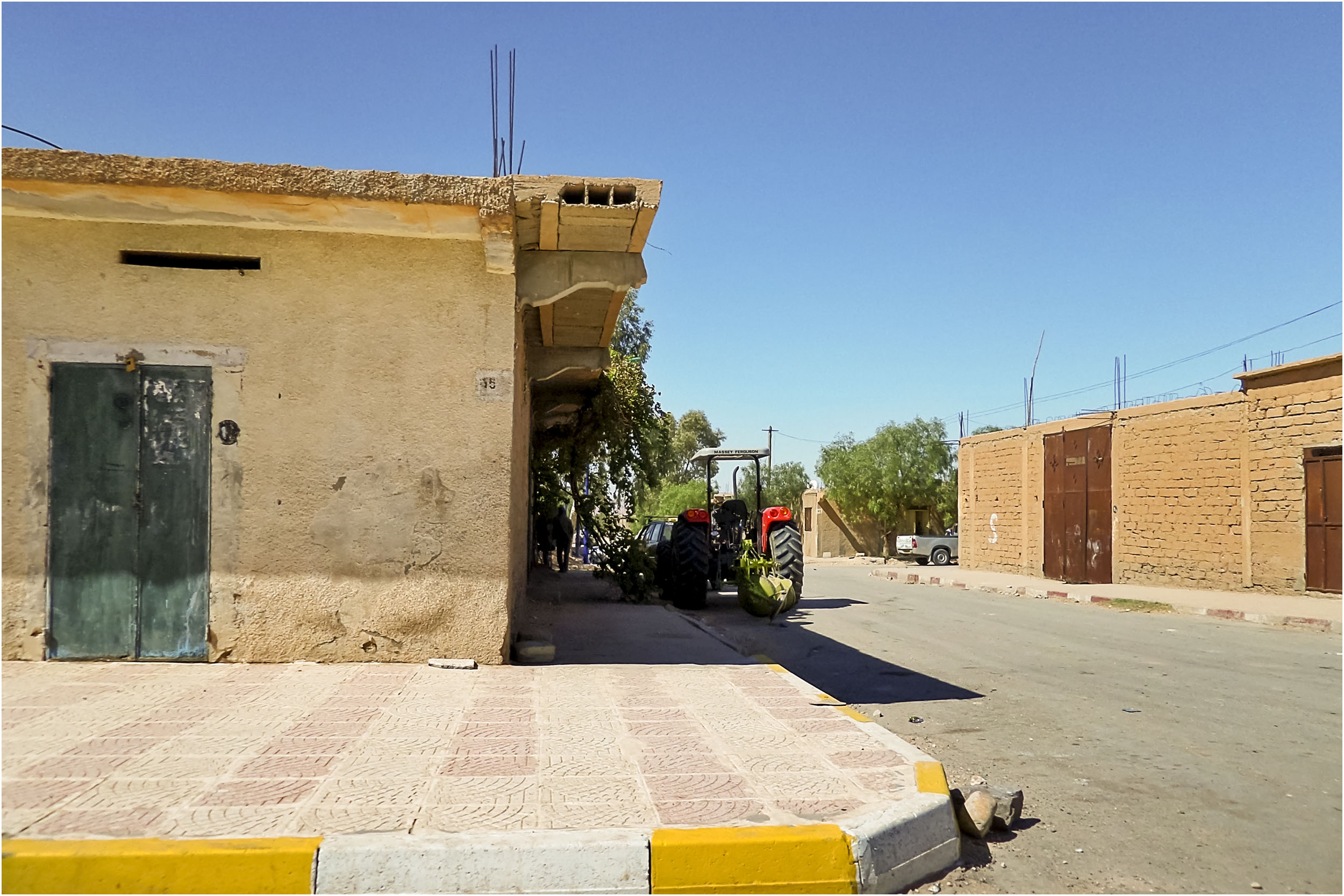
- Interactive map of Sidi Baizid
- Country: Algeria
- Province: Djelfa Province

Population (1998)
  - Total: 11,360
- Time zone: UTC+1 (CET)

Sidi Baizid is a town and commune in Djelfa Province, Algeria. According to the 1998 census it has a population of 11,360.
