= Norbert Werbs =

German bishop and theologian (1940–2023)

His Excellency Norbert Werbs
- Auxiliary Bishop Emeritus of Hamburg
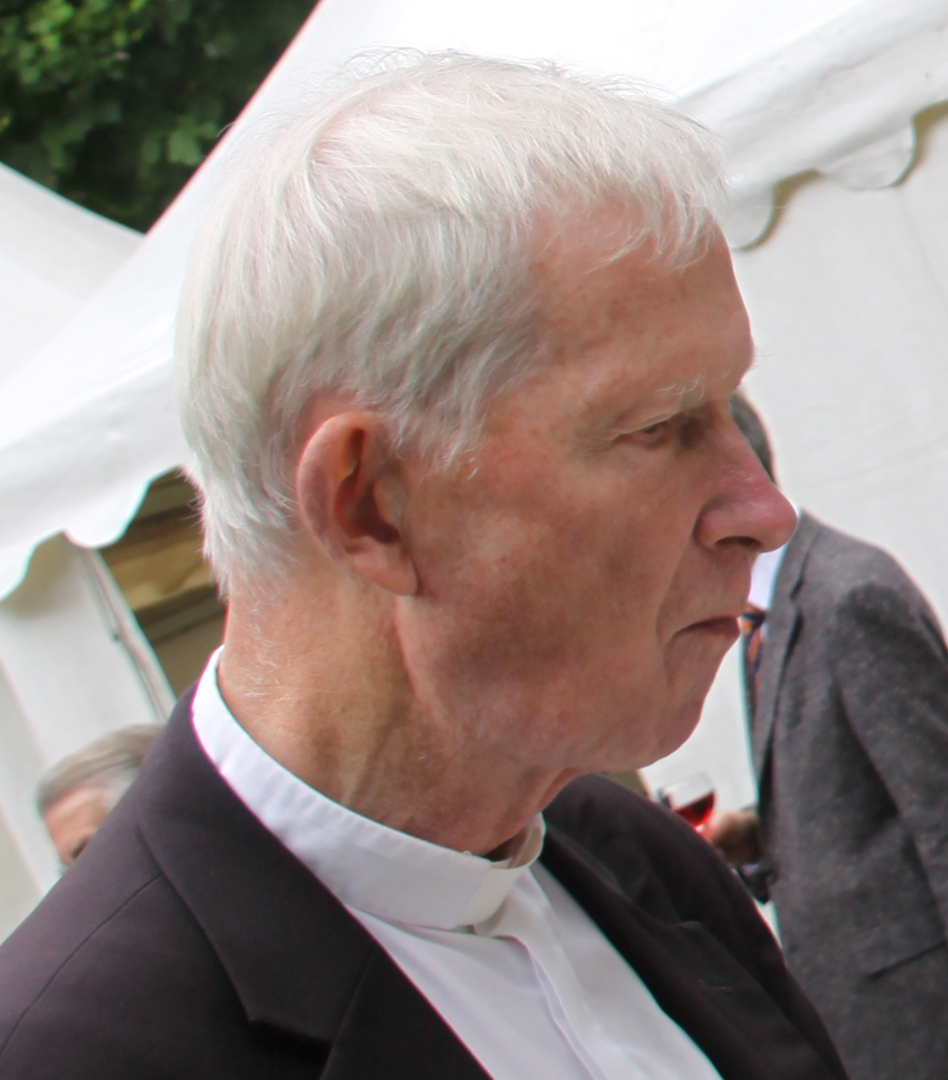
- Appointed: 7 January 1981
- Term ended: 20 May 2015
- Other post: Titular Bishop of Amaura (1981–2023)

Personal details
- Born: 20 May 1940 Warnemünde, Gau Mecklenburg, Germany
- Died: 3 January 2023 (aged 82) Neubrandenburg, Mecklenburg-Vorpommern, Germany
- Coat of arms

Norbert Werbs (20 May 1940 – 3 January 2023) was a German Roman Catholic prelate and theologian.

Born in Warnemünde, Rostock, Werbs was ordained to the priesthood in 1964. He was appointed auxiliary bishop of Hamburg in 1994, serving until his retirement in 2015.

Werbs died in Neubrandenburg on 3 January 2023, at the age of 82.

Catholic Church titles
Preceded by —	Auxiliary Bishop of Hamburg; 1981–2015	Succeeded by —
Preceded by Etienne-Auguste-Germain Loosdregt	Titular Bishop of Amaura; 1981–2023	Succeeded by Vacant
