= Mouadjebara =

- Commune and town
- Interactive map of Mouadjebara
- Country: Algeria
- Province: Djelfa Province

Population (1998)
  - Total: 10,365
- Time zone: UTC+1 (CET)

Mouadjebara is a town and commune in Djelfa Province, Algeria. According to the 1998 census it has a population of 10,365.
