= Aïn Chouhada =

Coordinates: 34°14′28″N 2°31′19″E

- Commune and town
- Location of Aïn Chouhada within Djelfa Province
- Country: Algeria
- Province: Djelfa Province

Population (1998)
  - Total: 8,337
- Time zone: UTC+1 (CET)

Aïn Chouhada is a town and commune in Djelfa Province, Algeria. According to the 1998 census it has a population of 8,337.

== Geographical location ==
The municipality of Aïn Chouhada is located in the western borders of the state of Djelfa, 110 km from the state headquarters and 75 km from the city of Laghouat. It is bordered on the north by the municipality of Idrissiya, on the south by the municipality of Sidi Makhlouf, on the east by the municipality of Al-Duwais, and on the west by the municipality of Tajmot
