= Aïn Maabed =

- Commune and town
- Location of Aïn Maabed within Djelfa Province

- Location of Aïn Maabed within Algeria
- Coordinates: 34°48′N 3°08′E
- Country: Algeria
- Province: Djelfa Province

Population (2008)
  - Total: 19,997
- Time zone: UTC+1 (CET)

Aïn Maabed is a town and commune in Djelfa Province, Algeria. According to the 1998 census it has a population of 13,183. Aïn Maabed lies on the N1 Trans-Saharan highway to the north by road from the provincial capital of Djelfa. Further north along the highway is the town of Hassi Bahbah.
