= Beni Yagoub =

Coordinates: 34°27′59″N 2°47′06″E

- Commune and town
- Interactive map of Beni Yagoub
- Country: Algeria
- Province: Djelfa Province
- Time zone: UTC+1 (CET)

Beni Yagoub is a town and commune in Djelfa Province, Algeria.
