= Oum Laadham =

Coordinates: 33°43′13″N 4°31′50″E

- Commune and town
- Interactive map of Oum Laadham
- Country: Algeria
- Province: Djelfa Province

Population (1998)
  - Total: 13,696
- Time zone: UTC+1 (CET)

Oum Laadham is a town and commune in Djelfa Province, Algeria. According to the 1998 census it has a population of 13,696.
