= Sidi Ladjel =

- Commune and town
- Location within Algeria
- Coordinates: 35°26′N 2°30′E
- Country: Algeria
- Province: Djelfa Province

Population (1998)
  - Total: 11,776
- Time zone: UTC+1 (CET)

Sidi Ladjel is a town and commune in Djelfa Province, Algeria. According to the 1998 census it has a population of 11,776. The town lies on the N40 highway.
