= Guernini =

- Commune and town
- Location within Algeria
- Coordinates: 35°11′59″N 02°40′55″E
- Country: Algeria
- Province: Djelfa Province

Population (1998)
  - Total: 4,036
- Time zone: UTC+1 (CET)

Guernini is a town and commune in Djelfa Province, Algeria. According to the 1998 census it has a population of 4,038.
