= Hassi Bahbah =

- Commune and town
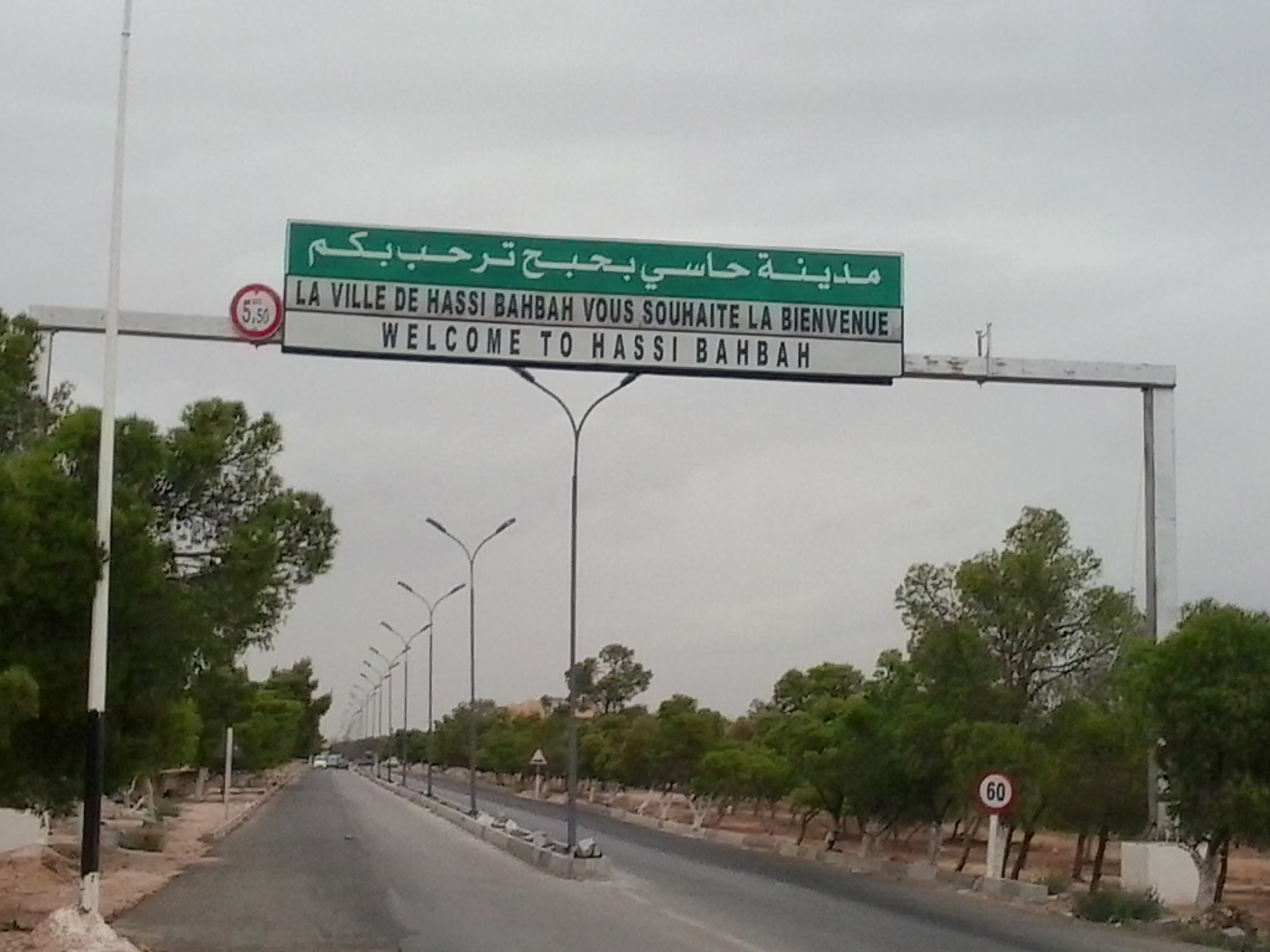

- Location within Algeria
- Coordinates: 35°04′N 3°02′E
- Country: Algeria
- Province: Djelfa Province

Population (2008)
  - Total: 86,421
- Time zone: UTC+1 (CET)

Hassi Bahbah is a town and commune in Djelfa Province, Algeria. At the 2008 census, it had a population of 77,000. The town lies along the N1 Trans-Saharan highway, north of the town of Aïn Maabed.

Hassi Bahbah municipality was established in 1959 AD, as it is considered one of the most important municipalities in the state of Djelfa in terms of population and location.

== Geographical location ==
It is located 242 km south of Algiers and 50 km north of the state headquarters on National Road No. 01. It occupies an area of 763 km². The municipality’s territory includes, besides the main population, two secondary communities: Hassi El Marra and Hassi El Masran.
