= Faidh El Botma =

Coordinates: 34°31′40″N 3°46′55″E

- Commune and town
- Interactive map of Faidh El Botma
- Country: Algeria
- Province: Djelfa Province

Population (2008)
  - Total: 26,857
- Time zone: UTC+1 (CET)

Faidh El Botma is a town and commune in Djelfa Province, Algeria. According to the 2008 census it has a population of 26,857.
