= Bouira Lahdab =

Coordinates: 35°14′38″N 3°08′32″E

- Commune and town
- Country: Algeria
- Province: Djelfa Province

Population (1998)
  - Total: 8,897
- Time zone: UTC+1 (CET)

Bouira Lahdab is a town and commune in Djelfa Province, Algeria. According to the 1998 census it has a population of 8897.
