= El Idrissia =

- Commune and town
- Location within Algeria
- Coordinates: 34°27′N 2°32′E
- Country: Algeria
- Province: Djelfa Province

Population (2008)
  - Total: 29,856
- Time zone: UTC+1 (CET)

El Idrissia is a town and commune in Djelfa Province, Algeria. According to the 2008 census it has a population of 29,856. It used to be known as Zenina, named after a wealthy woman who was married to a Roman officer called Serdoun. This name was given to the nearby mountain.
