= Aïn Feka =

- Commune and town
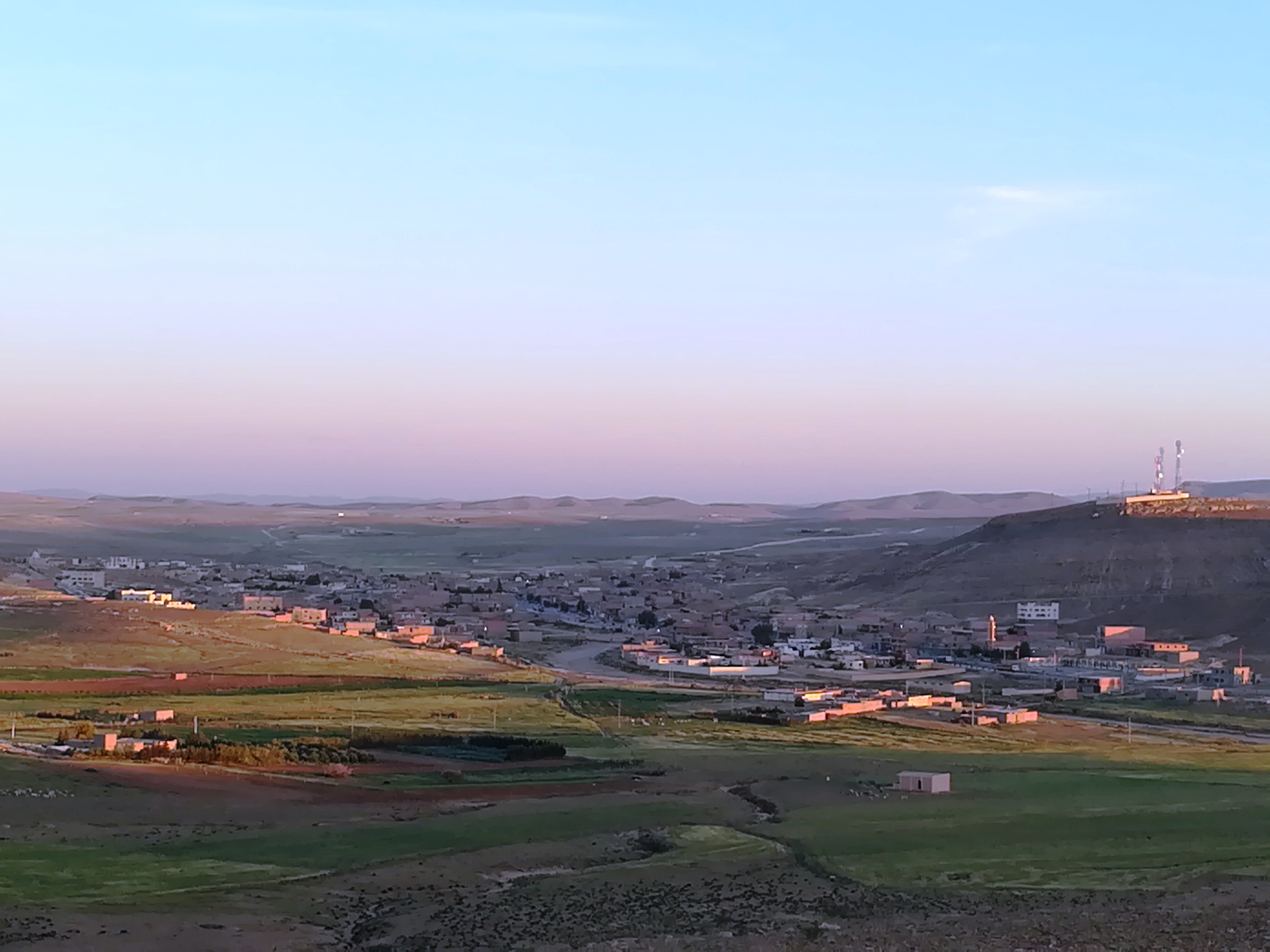

- Location within Algeria
- Coordinates: 35°26′N 3°35′E
- Country: Algeria
- Province: Djelfa Province

Population (1998)
  - Total: 16,842
- Time zone: UTC+1 (CET)

Aïn Feka is a small town and commune in Djelfa Province, Algeria. According to the 1998 census it has a population of 16,842. The town lies on the N89 highway.
