= Had-Sahary =

Coordinates: 35°21′06″N 3°21′39″E

- Commune and town
- Interactive map of Had-Sahary
- Country: Algeria
- Province: Djelfa Province

Population (1998)
  - Total: 22,277
- Time zone: UTC+1 (CET)

Had-Sahary is a town and commune in Djelfa Province, Algeria. According to the 1998 census it has a population of 22,277.
