= Aïn Oussera =

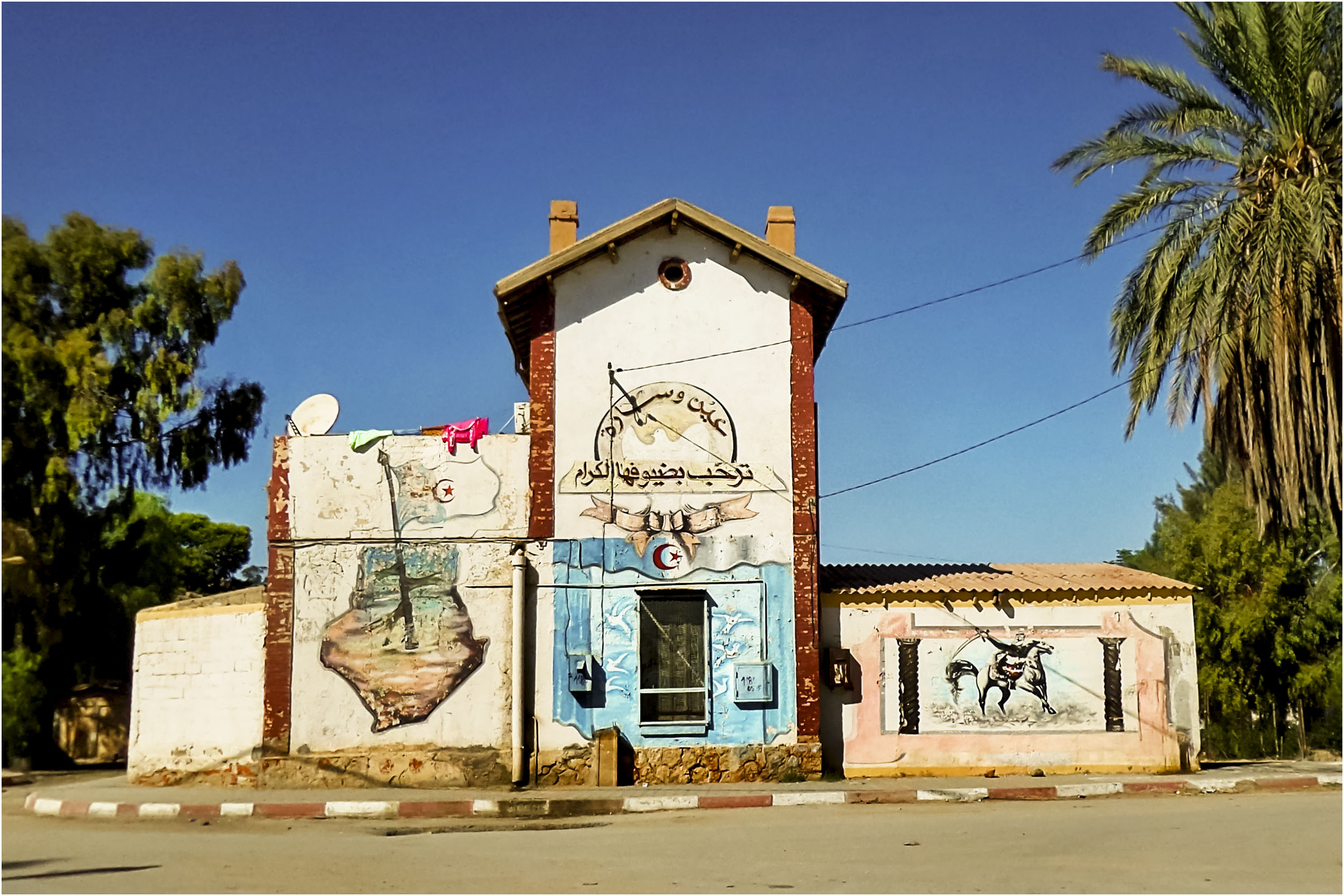

- Location of Aïn Oussera within Algeria
- Coordinates: 35°26′56″N 2°54′16″E
- Country: Algeria
- Province: Aïn Oussera Province
- District: Aïn Oussera
- Elevation: 687 m (2,254 ft)

Population (2005)
  - Total: 134,174
- Time zone: UTC+1 (West Africa Time)
- Postal code: 17200

Aïn Oussera or Aïn Oussara (Arabic: عين وسارة) is a city in Aïn Oussera Province, serving as its provincial capital. In 2005 the city had an estimated population of 134,174. It is the district seat of the Aïn Oussera District. This city, located 200 km south of the capital Algiers, is crossed by the Trans-Saharan Highway main road number 1. The road that runs through the whole of Algeria from north to south over 2000 km, connects Algiers on its southern border with Mali near Tamanrasset. Ain Oussera, has experienced, since 1990, rapid population growth due to its proximity to the 15 MW Es Salam nuclear reactor. Aïn Oussera is on the crossroads of the N1 (Trans-Saharan) and N40B highways. The nearest airport is the Algerian Air Force's Aïn Oussera airfield (DAAQ).

== Geography ==
=== Climate ===
Aïn Oussera has a cold semi-arid climate (Köppen climate classification BSk), while it closely borders cold desert climate (BWk).

Climate data for Ain Oussera
Month	Jan	Feb	Mar	Apr	May	Jun	Jul	Aug	Sep	Oct	Nov	Dec	Year
Mean daily maximum °C (°F)	13 (55)	16 (60)	18 (65)	21 (69)	26 (79)	32 (90)	37 (98)	37 (99)	31 (88)	23 (73)	17 (63)	12 (54)	23 (74)
Mean daily minimum °C (°F)	1 (34)	3 (37)	6 (43)	7 (44)	11 (52)	17 (62)	19 (66)	19 (67)	16 (60)	11 (51)	6 (43)	3 (38)	10 (50)
Average precipitation mm (inches)	15 (0.6)	25 (1)	33 (1.3)	25 (1)	15 (0.6)	30 (1.2)	0 (0)	5.1 (0.2)	36 (1.4)	20 (0.8)	15 (0.6)	20 (0.8)	240 (9.5)
Source: Weatherbase
