= Guettara =

Coordinates: 33°09′31″N 4°41′07″E

- Commune and town
- Interactive map of Guettara
- Country: Algeria
- Province: Djelfa Province

Population (1998)
  - Total: 11,151
- Time zone: UTC+1 (CET)

Guettara is a town and commune in Djelfa Province, Algeria. According to the 1998 census it has a population of 11,151.
