= El Khemis =

- Commune and town
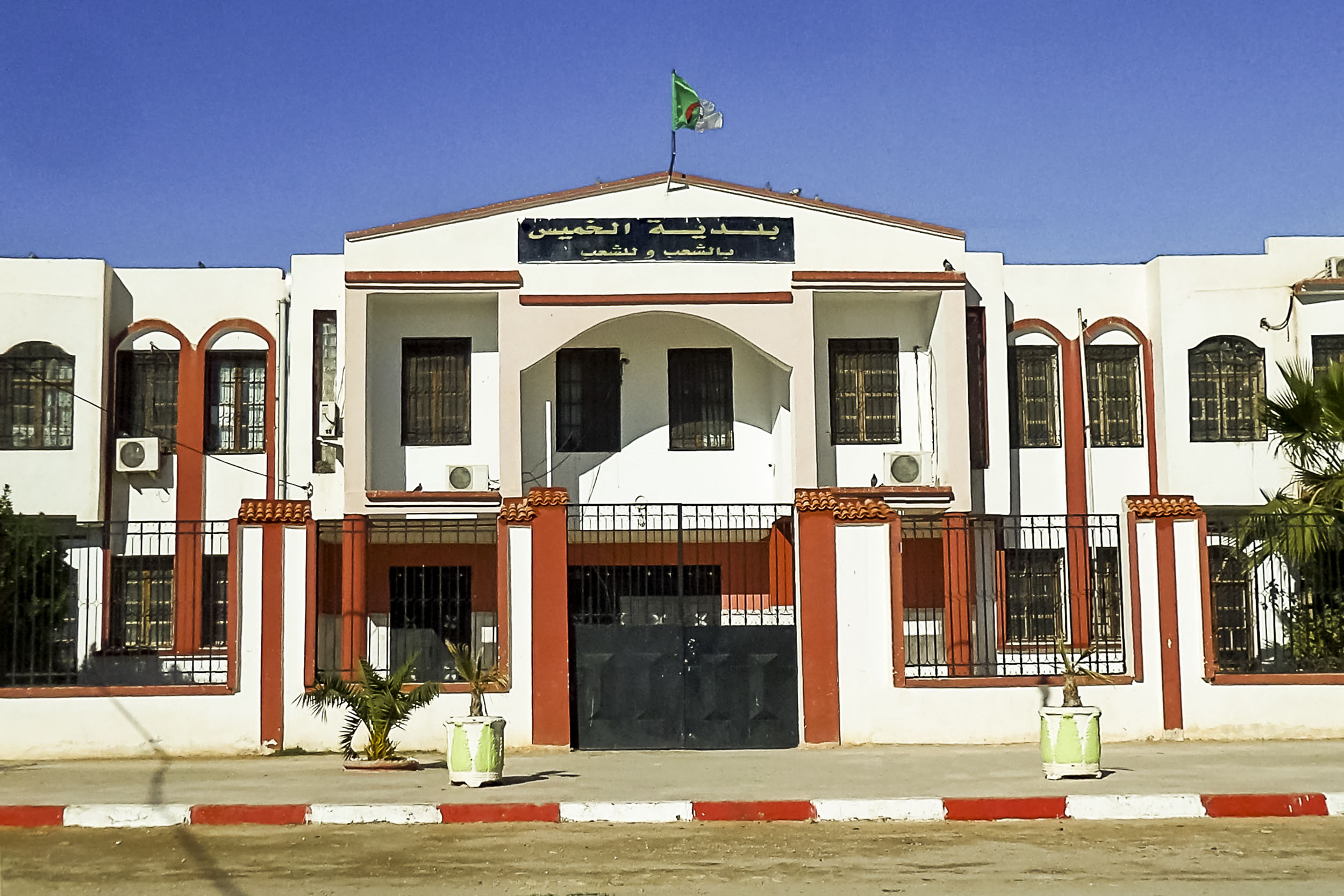

- Location within Algeria
- Country: Algeria
- Province: Djelfa Province

Population (1998)
  - Total: 4,769
- Time zone: UTC+1 (CET)

El Khemis is a town and commune in Djelfa Province, Algeria. According to the 1998 census it has a population of 4,769.
