= Sed Rahal =

Coordinates: 33°56′33″N 3°13′52″E

- Commune and town
- Interactive map of Sed Rahal
- Country: Algeria
- Province: Djelfa Province

Area
  - Total: 368 sq mi (954 km^{2})

Population (2008)
  - Total: 13,693
- Time zone: UTC+1 (CET)

Sed Rahal is a town and commune in Djelfa Province, Algeria. According to the 1998 census, it had a population of 11,812. As of April 14, 2008, the population of Sed Rahal grew to 13,693 with the population being 46.5% female and 53.5% male.
