= Hassi Fedoul =

Coordinates: 35°26′N 2°13′E

- Commune and town
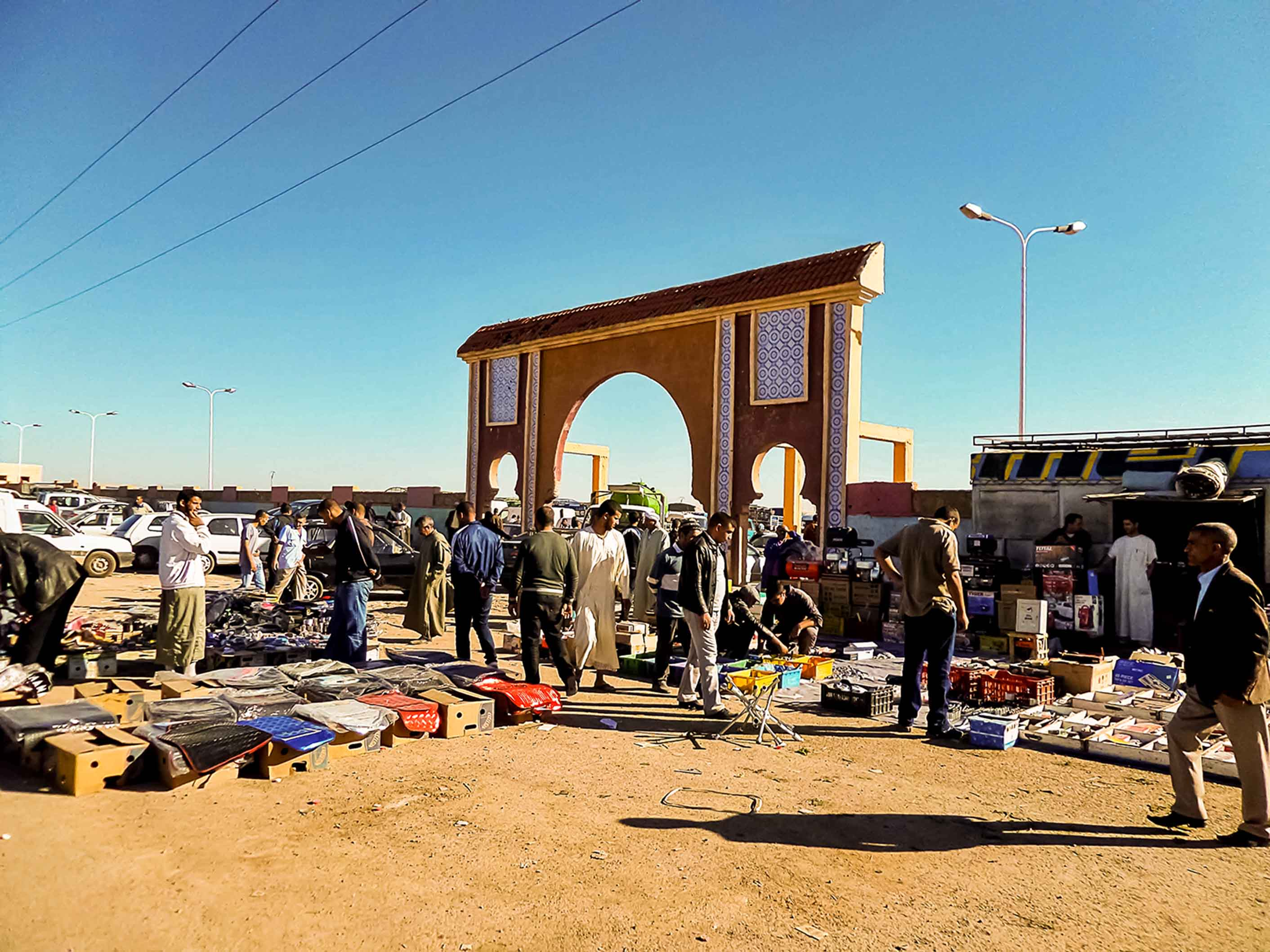
- Weekly market (Souk) in Hassi Fedoul Sidi El Ajjal, Djelfa Province
- Interactive map of Hassi Fedoul
- Country: Algeria
- Province: Djelfa Province

Population (1998)
  - Total: 12,221
- Time zone: UTC+1 (CET)

Hassi Fedoul is a town and commune in Djelfa Province, Algeria. According to the 1998 census it has a population of 12,221.
