= Mouilha =

Mouliha ar المليحية
- Commune and town
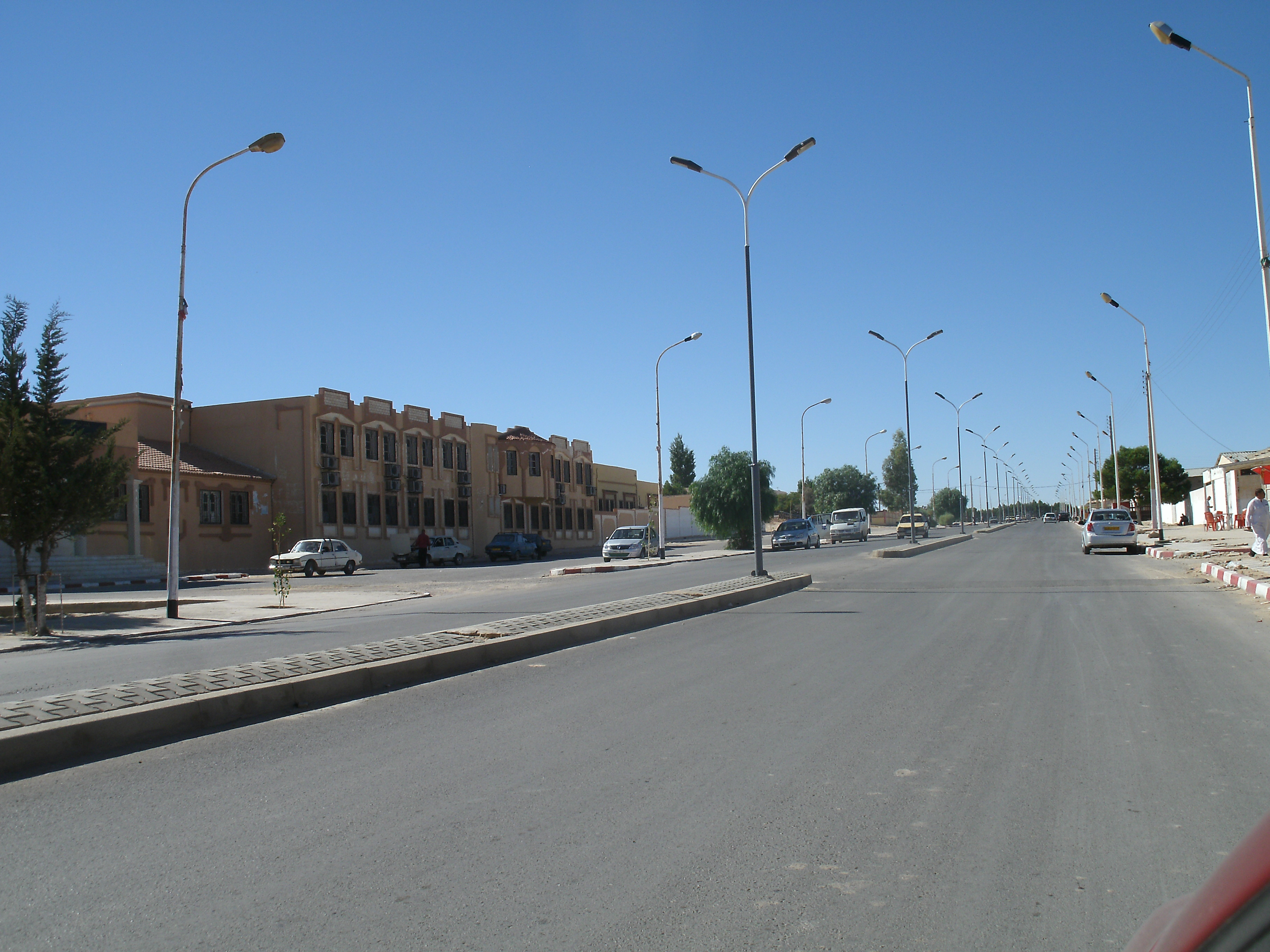
- Nickname: Aïn Mouilah

- Location within Algeria
- Coordinates: 34°45′N 3°29′E
- Country: Algeria
- Province: Djelfa Province

Population (1998)
  - Total: 13,155
- Time zone: UTC+1 (CET)

Mouilha, Aïn Mouilha or M'Liliha is a town and commune in Djelfa Province, Algeria. According to the 1998 census it has a population of 13,155. It lies on the N46 highway, northeast of Djelfa.
