= Deldoul, Djelfa =

Coordinates: 34°12′19″N 3°15′11″E

- Interactive map of Deldoul, Djelfa
- Country: Algeria
- Province: Djelfa

Population (1998)
  - Total: 13,171
- Time zone: UTC+1 (West Africa Time)

Deldoul, Djelfa is a town in north-central Algeria.
