= Amourah =

Coordinates: 34°21′16″N 3°52′15″E

Amourah عمورة
- Commune and town
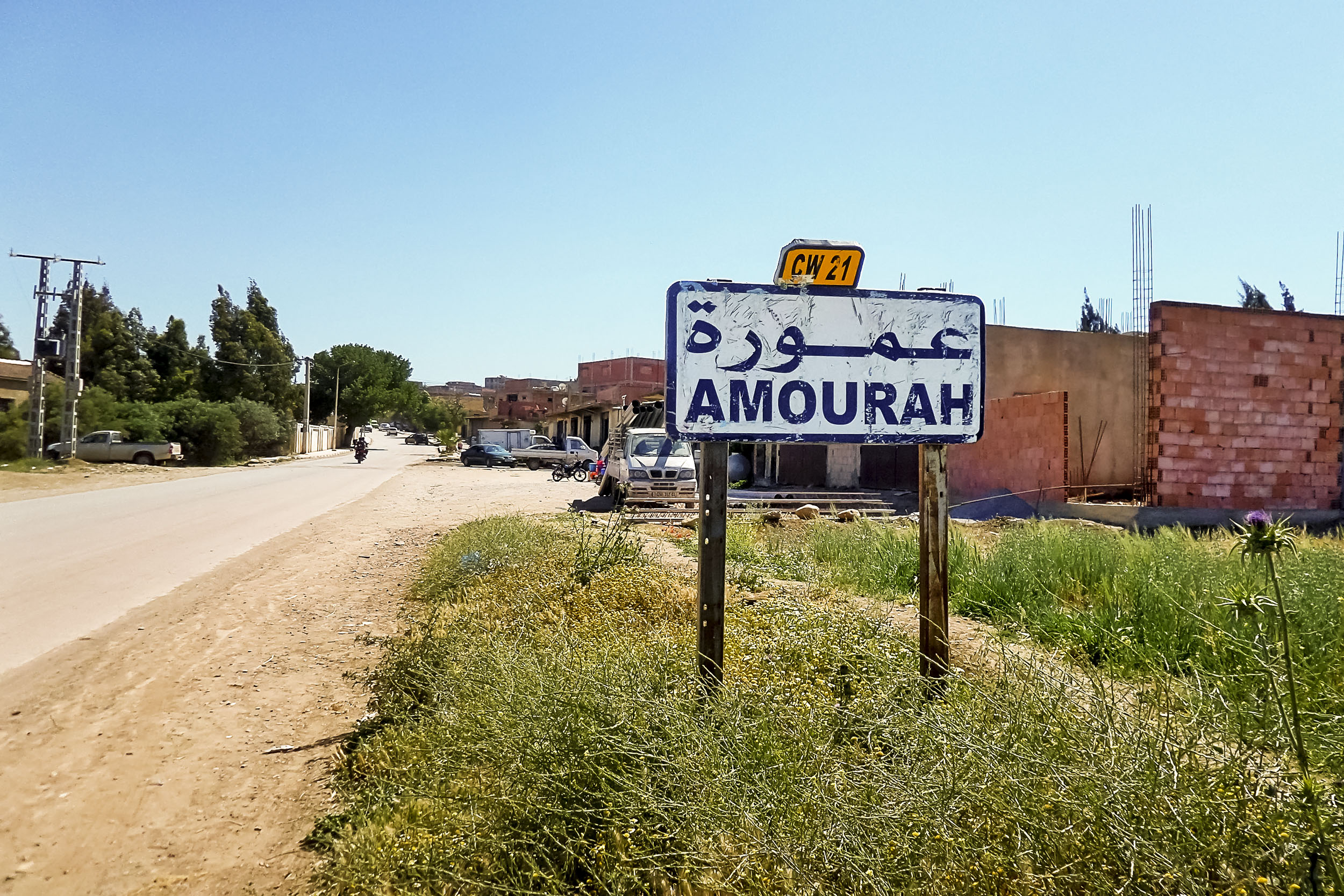
- Nickname: Sufasar
- Interactive map of Amourah
- Country: Algeria
- Province: Djelfa Province

Population (1998)
  - Total: 5,879
  - Density: 19/sq mi (7.4/km^{2})
- Time zone: UTC+1 (CET)

Amourah, or Amoura is a town and Latin Catholic titular bishopric in Algeria.

The commune lies in Djelfa Province. According to the 1998 census it has a population of 5,879.

== History ==
Amaura corresponds to ancient Sufasar, a town in the Roman province of Mauretania Caesariensis during the Vandal Kingdom, Byzantine Empire and Roman Empire.

== Titular bishopric ==
Of this ancient diocese only one bishop is known, Reparatus, a Catholic, who intervened at the Conference of Carthage of 411; on that occasion the seat had no Donatist bishops.

An entry in the records of the Carthage Conference of 484 could, according to Mesnage, be a bishop of the town.

Today, Sufasar survives as a titular bishopric and the current bishop is Augustinus Kim Jong-soo, auxiliary bishop of Daejeon.

- Reparatus (fl.411)

No longer a residential bishopric, Amaura is today listed by the Catholic Church as a titular see, of the lowest (episcopal) rank.

Since the diocese was thus nominally restored in 1933, it has had the following non-consecutive incumbents :

- Étienne-Auguste-Germain Loosdregt, Missionary Oblates of Mary Immaculate (O.M.I.) (1952.03.13 – death 1980.11.13), as Apostolic Vicar of Vientiane (Laos) (1952.03.13 – resigned 1975) and President of Episcopal Conference of Laos and Cambodia (1964 – retired 1978)
- Norbert Werbs (1981.01.07 – death 2023.01.03), first as Auxiliary Bishop of North German Missions (Germany) (1981.01.07 – 1994.10.24), then Auxiliary Bishop emeritus of Hamburg (Germany) (1994.10.24 – retired 2015.05.20).

== External links and sources ==
- GCatholic
