= Benhar, Djelfa =

Coordinates: 35°29′05″N 3°00′35″E

Benhar
- Commune and town
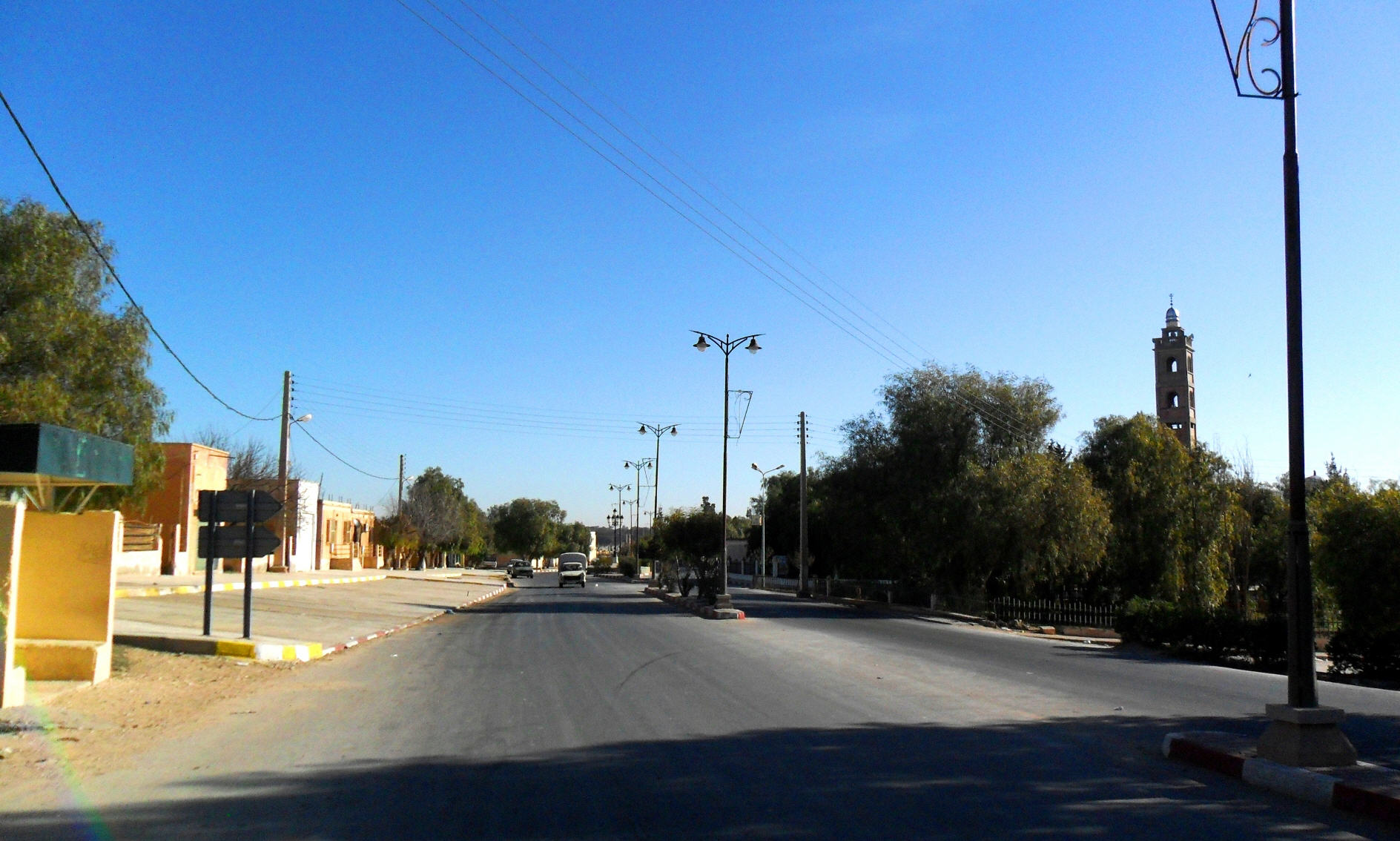
- Interactive map of Benhar
- Country: Algeria
- Province: Djelfa Province

Population (1998)
  - Total: 10,380
- Time zone: UTC+1 (CET)

Benhar is a small town and commune in Djelfa Province, Algeria. According to the 1998 census it has a population of 10,380 and it has the biggest surface in Djelfa.
