= Charef =

- Commune and town
- Location within Algeria
- Coordinates: 34°37′N 2°48′E
- Country: Algeria
- Province: Djelfa Province

Population (1998)
  - Total: 19,373
- Time zone: UTC+1 (CET)

Charef is a town and commune in Djelfa Province, Algeria. According to the 1998 census it had a population of 19,373.

== Language ==
The most commonly spoken language is Arabic
