= Messaâd =

Messad
- Commune and town
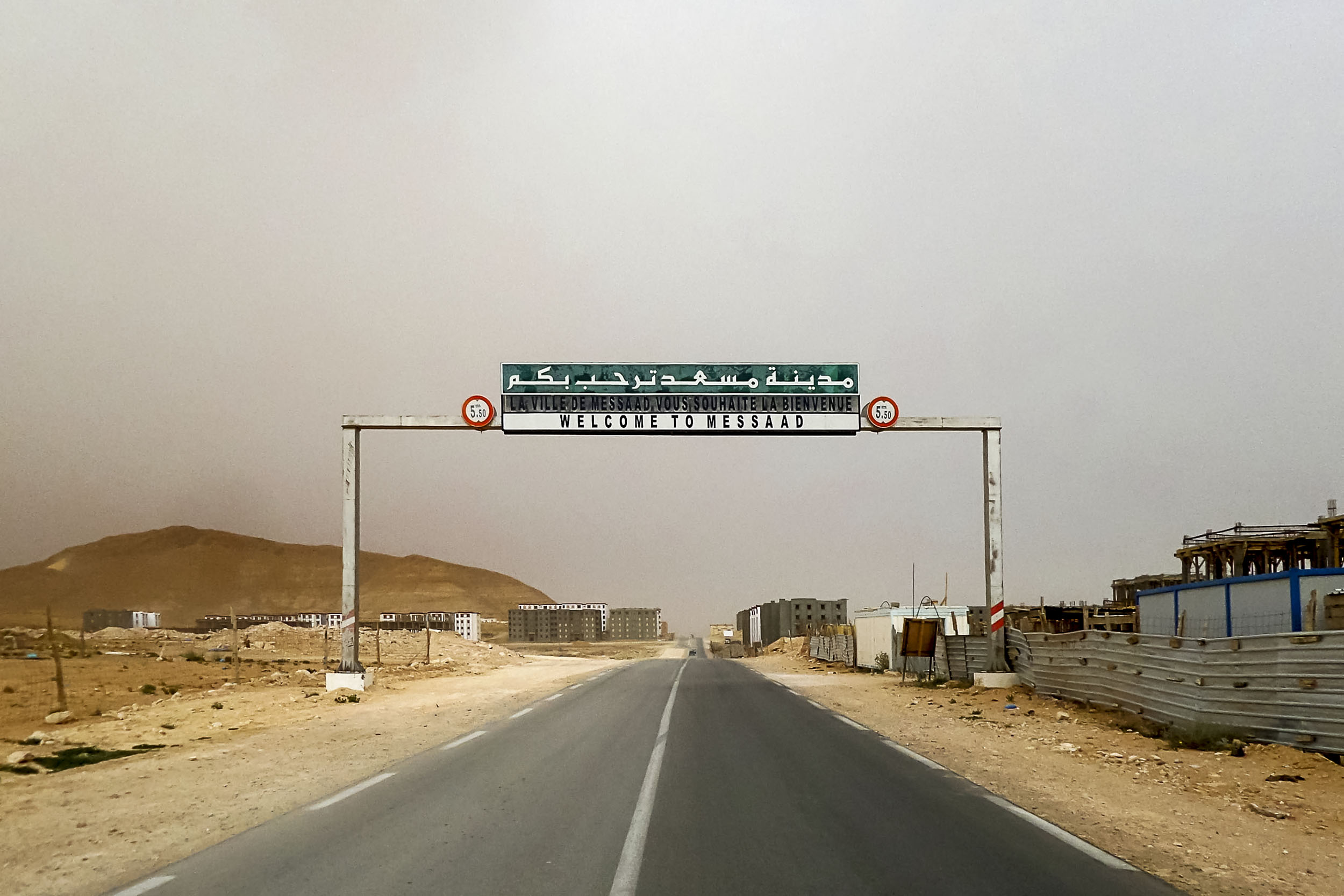

- Location within Algeria
- Coordinates: 34°10′0″N 3°30′0″E
- Country: Algeria
- Province: Messaad Province

Population (2008 Census)
  - Total: 97,091
- Time zone: UTC+1 (West Africa Time)

Messad (sometimes Messaad; Arabic: مسعد) is a town in Algeria, serving as the provincial capital of the Messaad Province. It was the Roman Castellum Dimmidi.

== History ==
It is about 290 km (180 mi) south of Algiers. During the Roman period it was known as Castellum Dimmidi after the Romans under emperor Septimius Severus seized the settlement. It is unclear if the second part of the name, Dimmidi, was a native name transliterated into Latin, or a new name given by the Romans.

As the Castellum (castle) implies, the settlement was a fortress along the Limes Tripolitanus, the southern border of the province of Numidia. It was a prosperous village and hosted a Roman garrison from roughly 198 to 240 AD.

Messaad has a population of nearly 120,000 inhabitants.

== See also ==
- Castellum Dimmidi
