= Djelfa Province =

Province of Algeria

Djelfa Province ولاية الجلفة
- Province
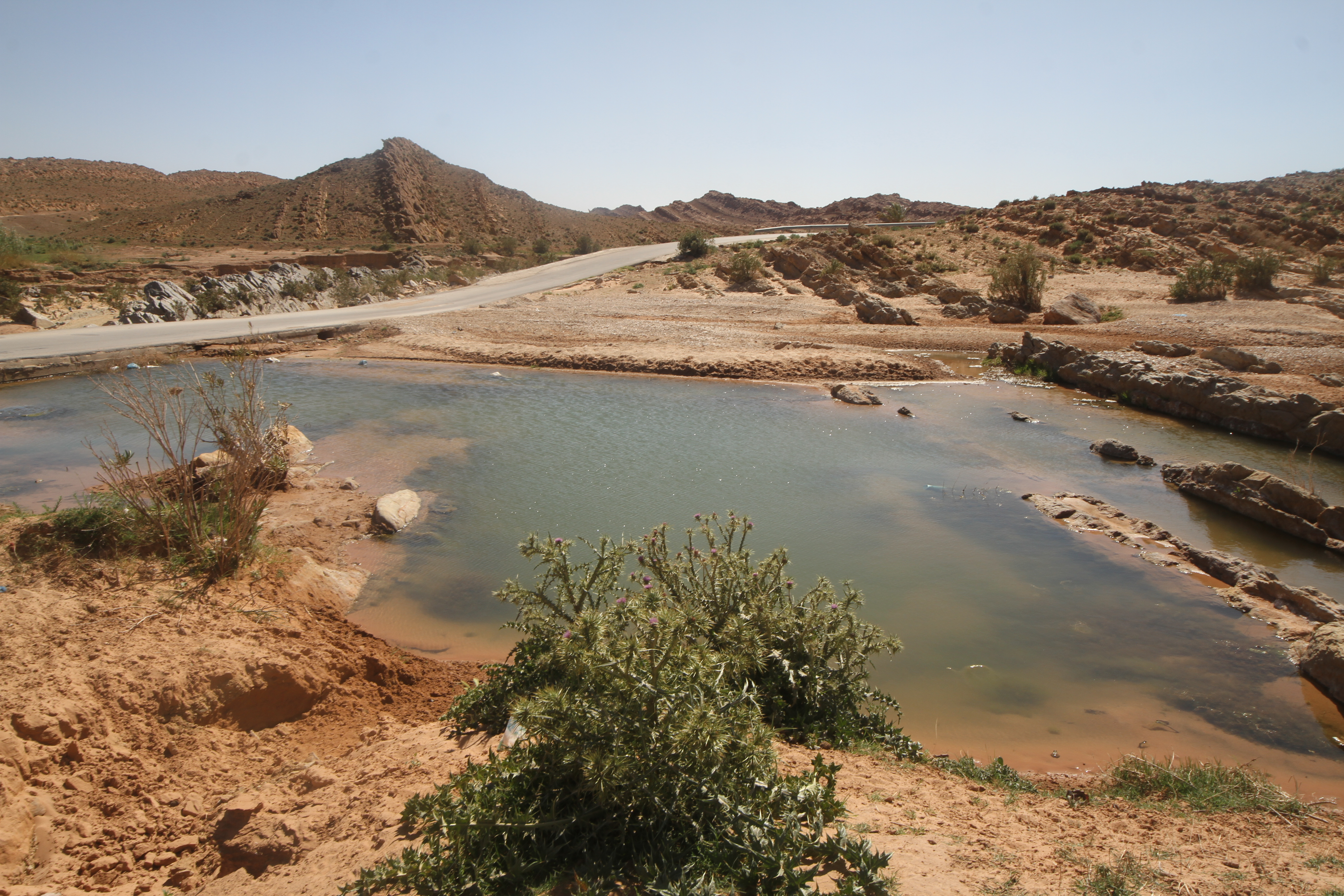

- Map of Algeria highlighting Djelfa
- Coordinates: 34°40′30″N 3°15′30″E
- Country: Algeria
- Capital: Djelfa

Government
  - Wāli: Djahid Mous

Area
  - Total: 66,415 km^{2} (25,643 sq mi)

Population (2008)
  - Total: 1,223,223
  - Density: 18.418/km^{2} (47.702/sq mi)
- Time zone: UTC+01 (CET)
- Area Code: +213 (0) 27
- ISO 3166 code: DZ-17
- Districts: 12
- Municipalities: 36

Djelfa (Arabic: ولاية الجلفة) is a province (wilaya) of Algeria and its capital is Djelfa. It was first established by the administrative reorganization of 1974, and is home to over 1,595,794 inhabitants. Localities in this province include Tadmit, El Khemis, and Selmana.

== History ==
The province was created from parts of Batna (département), Médéa (département), Oasis department and Tiaret department in 1974.

== Administrative divisions ==
The province is made up of 12 districts, which are further divided into 36 communes or municipalities.

=== Districts ===
1. Aïn El Ibil
2. Aïn Oussera
3. Birine
4. Charef
5. Dar Chioukh
6. Djelfa
7. El Idrissia
8. Faidh El Botma
9. Had Sahary
10. Hassi Bahbah
11. Messaâd
12. Sidi Ladjel

=== Communes ===
1. Aïn Chouhada
2. Aïn El Ibel
3. Aïn Feka
4. Aïn Maabed
5. Aïn Oussera
6. Amourah
7. Benhar
8. Beni Yagoub
9. Birine
10. Bouira Lahdab
11. Charef
12. Dar Chioukh

13. Deldoul
14. Djelfa
15. Douis
16. El Guedid
17. El Idrissia
18. El Khemis
19. Faidh El Botma
20. Guernini
21. Guettara
22. Had-Sahary
23. Hassi Bahbah
24. Hassi El Euch

25. Hassi Fedoul
26. Messad
27. M'Liliha
28. Mouadjebara
29. Oum Laadham
30. Sed Rahal
31. Selmana
32. Sidi Baizid
33. Sidi Ladjel
34. Tadmit
35. Zaafrane
36. Zaccar

The communes of the province of Djelfa
