= Provinces of Algeria =

Algeria, as of 2025, is divided into 69 wilayas (provinces). Prior to November 16, 2025, there were 58 provinces. The 69 provinces are divided into 1,541 baladiyahs (municipalities). The name of a province is always that of its capital city.

According to the Algerian constitution, a wilaya is a territorial collectivity enjoying economic and diplomatic freedom, the APW, or Popular Provincial Parliament/Provincial Popular Parliament (the Assemblée Populaire Wilayale, in French) is the political entity governing a province, directed by the Wali (Governor), who is chosen by the Algerian President to handle the APW's decisions, the APW also has a president, who is elected by the members of the APW, which Algerians elect.

On November 16, 2025, the announcement was made of 11 new provinces in the Hautes Plaines and the south of the country. These 11 new provinces are Aflou, Barika, Ksar Chellala, Messaad, Aïn Oussera, Boussaâda, El Abiodh Sidi Cheikh, El Kantara, Bir El Ater, Ksar El Boukhari, and El Aricha. Creating these new provinces made the provinces of Laghouat, Batna, Tiaret, Djelfa, M'sila, El Bayadh, Biskra, Médéa, and Tlemcen, smaller.

== Provinces ==
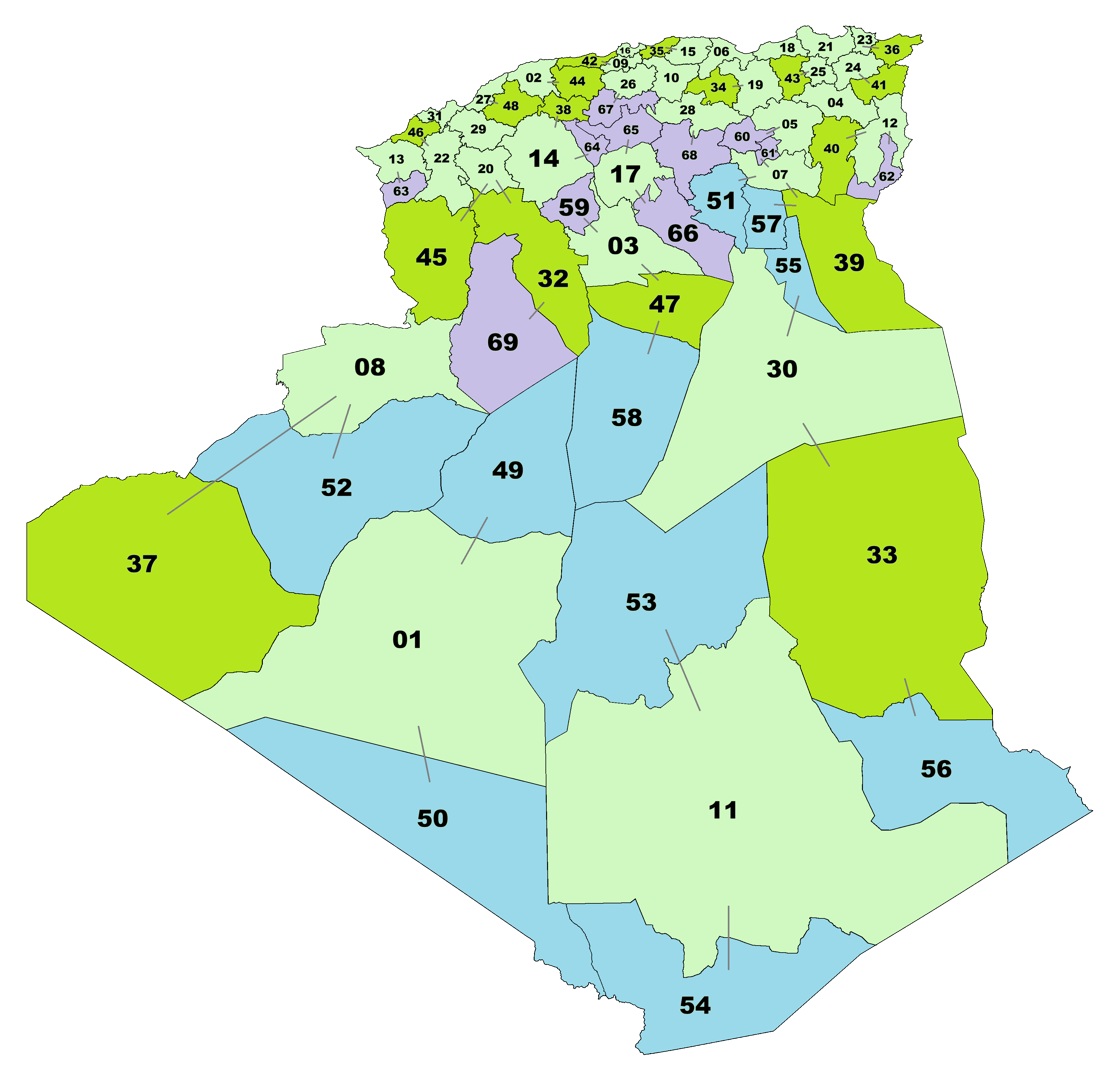
Algeria's 69 provinces, updated per Law N° 26-06, April 4, 2026.

By 1984 the number of Algerian provinces was fixed at 48 and established the list of municipalities or "communes" attached to each province. In 2019, 10 new provinces were added.

The province numbers are the first 31 provinces (see the second section) in Arabic alphabetical order, after the adding of 17 more provinces in 1983 and 10 more in 2019, the old numbering was kept and the 27 provinces created since 1984 have been assigned codes from 32 to 58, in Arabic alphabetical order.

The following table presents the list of provinces, showing for each its numerical code, its name (which is in every case the same as the name of the capital city of the province), the number of districts ("dairas"), the number of municipalities, its area, and its population.

Map	Code	Province	Arabic name			
Map	Code	Province	Arabic name	01	Adrar	أدرار
	02	Chlef	الشلف (الأصنام)			
	03	Laghouat	الأغواط			
	04	Oum El Bouaghi	أم البواقي			
	05	Batna	باتنة			
	06	Béjaïa	بجاية			
	07	Biskra	بسكرة			
	08	Béchar	بشار			
	09	Blida	البليدة			
	10	Bouïra	البويرة			
	11	Tamanrasset	تمنراست (تامنراست)			
	12	Tébessa	تبسة			
	13	Tlemcen	تلمسان			
	14	Tiaret	تيارت			
	15	Tizi Ouzou	تيزي وزو			
	16	Algiers	الجزائر			
	17	Djelfa	الجلفة			
	18	Jijel	جيجل			
	19	Sétif	سطيف			
	20	Saïda	سعيدة			
	21	Skikda	سكيكدة			
	22	Sidi Bel Abbès	سيدي بلعباس			
	23	Annaba	عنابة			
	24	Guelma	قالمة			
	25	Constantine	قسنطينة			
	26	Médéa	المدية			
	27	Mostaganem	مستغانم			
	28	M'Sila	المسيلة			
	29	Mascara	معسكر			
	30	Ouargla	ورقلة			
	31	Oran	وهران			
	32	El Bayadh	البيض			
	33	Illizi	اليزي			
	34	Bordj Bou Arréridj	برج بوعريريج			
	35	Boumerdès	بومرداس			
	36	El Tarf	الطارف			
	37	Tindouf	تندوف			
	38	Tissemsilt	تسمسيلت			
	39	El Oued	الوادي			
	40	Khenchela	خنشلة			
	41	Souk Ahras	سوق أهراس			
	42	Tipaza	تيبازة			
	43	Mila	ميلة			
	44	Aïn Defla	عين الدفلى			
	45	Naâma	النعامة			
	46	Aïn Témouchent	عين تموشنت			
	47	Ghardaïa	غرداية			
	48	Relizane	غليزان			
	49	Timimoun	تيميمون			
	50	Bordj Badji Mokhtar	برج باجي مختار			
	51	Ouled Djellal	أولاد جلال			
	52	Béni Abbès	بني عباس			
	53	In Salah	عين صالح			
	54	In Guezzam	عين قزّام			
	55	Touggourt	تقرت			
	56	Djanet	جانت			
	57	El M'Ghair	المغير			
	58	El Menia	المنيعة			
	59	Aflou	آفلو			
	60	Barika	بريكة			
	61	El Kantara	القنطرة			
	62	Bir El Ater	بئر العاتر			
	63	El Aricha	العريشة			
	64	Ksar Chellala	قصر الشلالة			
	65	Aïn Oussera	عين وسارة			
	66	Messaad	مسعد			
	67	Ksar El Boukhari	قصر البخاري			
	68	Bousaâda	بوسعادة			
	69	El Abiodh Sidi Cheikh	الأبيض سيدي الشيخ			
Total

== History ==
In 2025, 11 new provinces were added. These provinces included:

1. Aflou
2. El Abiodh Sidi Cheikh
3. El Aricha
4. El Kantara
5. Barika
6. Bou Saâda
7. Bir El Ater
8. Ksar El Boukhari
9. Ksar Chellala
10. Aïn Oussera
11. Messaad

On 26 November 2019, the Cabinet of Algeria passed a bill to add 10 more provinces, by splitting some of the larger provinces in the south of Algeria into smaller ones. Thus, the following provinces have been added on December 18, 2019:

- Bordj Badji Mokhtar Province
- In Salah Province
- Djanet Province
- In Guezzam Province
- El M'Ghair Province
- Touggourt Province
- Béni Abbès Province
- Timimoun Province
- Ouled Djellal Province
- El Menia Province

Map of the provinces of Algeria numbered according to the official order.

In 1984, 17 new provinces were added. These provinces included:

1. El Bayadh
2. Illizi
3. Bordj Bou Arréridj
4. Boumerdès
5. El Taref
6. Tindouf
7. Tissemsilt
8. El Oued
9. Khenchela
10. Souk Ahras
11. Tipaza
12. Mila
13. Aïn Defla
14. Naâma
15. Aïn Témouchent
16. Ghardaïa
17. Relizane

The 15 departments were reorganized to form 31 provinces:

1. Adrar
2. Chlef
3. Laghouat
4. Oum el-Bouaghi
5. Batna
6. Béjaïa
7. Biskra
8. Béchar
9. Blida
10. Bouira
11. Tamanghasset
12. Tébessa
13. Tlemcen
14. Tiaret
15. Tizi Ouzou
16. Algiers
17. Djelfa
18. Jijel
19. Sétif
20. Saïda
21. Skikda
22. Sidi Bel Abbes
23. Annaba
24. Guelma
25. Constantine
26. Médéa
27. Mostaganem
28. M'sila
29. Mascara
30. Ouargla
31. Oran

Immediately after independence, Algeria retained its 15 former French départements, which were renamed wilayas (provinces) in 1968, for the most part, with some name changes:

- 8A-El Wahat (Currently Ouargla, formerly Oasis)
- 8B-Saoura (Currently Béchar)
- 9A-Alger (Algiers)
- 9B-Batna
- 9C-Annaba (Formerly Bône, English: Bona)
- 9D-Constantine
- 9E-Médéa
- 9F-Mostaganem
- 9G-Oran
- 9H-Orléansville (Then El Asnam, now Chlef)
- 9J-Sétif
- 9K-Tiaret
- 9L-Tizi-Ouzou
- 9M-Tlemcen
- 9R-Saïda

During the Algerian War of Independence, the FLN adopted an organizational system divided by 6 numbered wilayas:

1. Aurès
2. Constantine
3. Kabylie
4. Algiers
5. Oran
6. Sahara

== See also ==
- Municipalities of Algeria
- List of Algerian Provinces by population
- List of Algerian Provinces by area
- List of Algerian regions by Human Development Index
- ISO 3166-2:DZ
