= Council of Cirta =

The Council of Cirta may refer to either of the following ancient councils of the Catholic church held in this north African city:

- First Council of Cirta, held in 303 or 305
- Second Council of Cirta, June 412
