= Cirta steles =

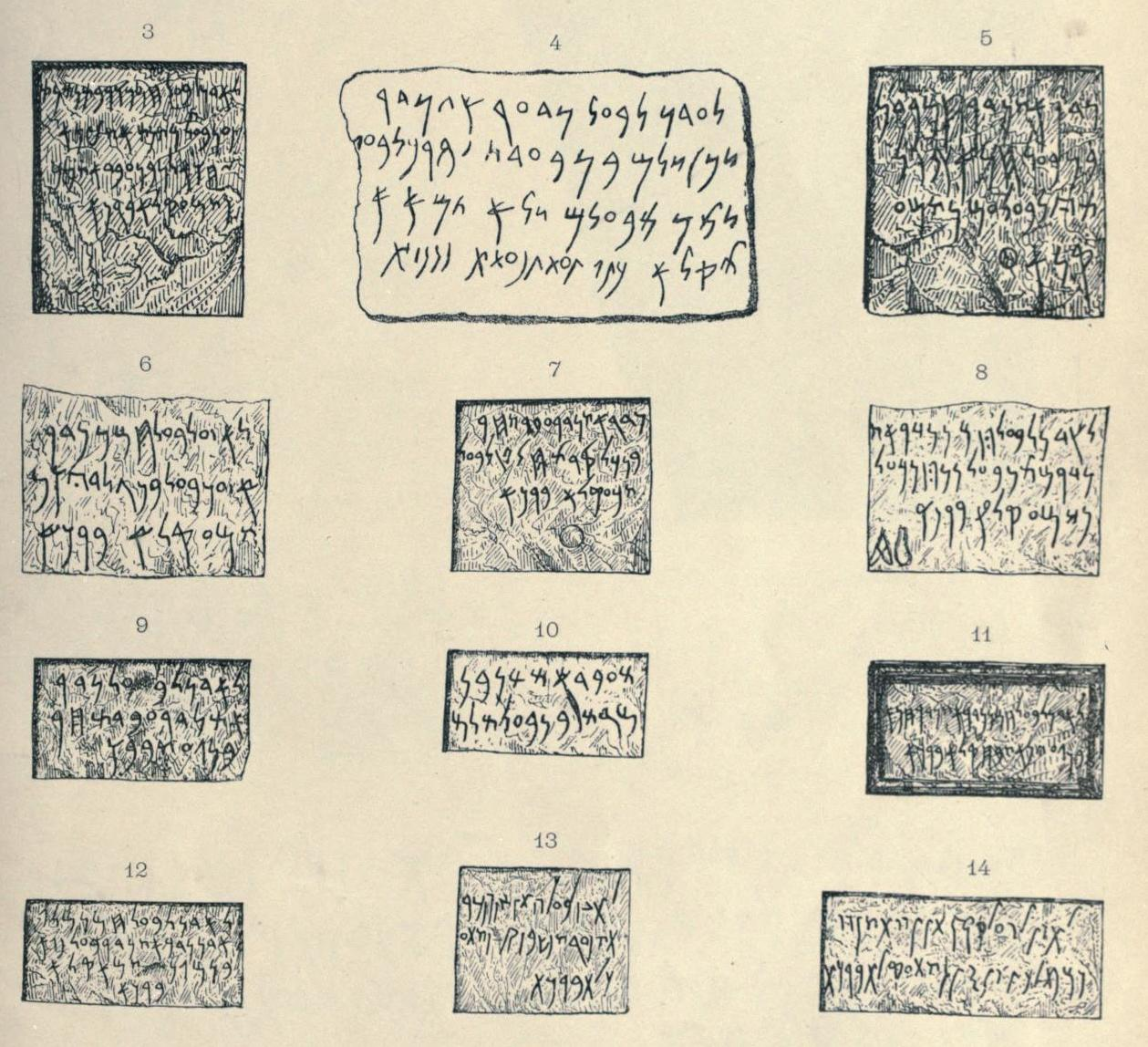
A selection of the inscriptions in Mark Lidzbarski's Handbuch der Nordsemitischen Epigraphik: #3 = Costa 12 #4 = Not included (found in 1860) #5 = Costa 18 #6 = Costa 34 #7 = Costa 24 #8 = Costa 28 (KAI 102, RES 1544, KI 95) #9 = Costa 13 #10 = Costa 25 (KAI 103, RES 339, KI 96) #11 = Costa 3 #12 = Costa 4 #13 = Costa 21 #14 = Costa 32

The Cirta steles are almost 1,000 Punic funerary and votive steles found in Cirta (today Constantine, Algeria) in a cemetery located on a hill immediately south of the Salah Bey Viaduct.

The first group of steles were published by Auguste Celestin Judas in 1861. The Lazare Costa inscriptions were the second group of these inscriptions found; they were discovered between 1875 and 1880 by Lazare Costa, a Constantine-based Italian antiquarian. Most of the steles are now in the Louvre. These are known as KAI 102–105.

In 1950, hundreds of additional steles were excavated from the same location – then named El Hofra – by André Berthier, director of the Gustave-Mercier Museum (today the Musée national Cirta) and Father René Charlier, professor at the Constantine seminary. Many of these steles are now in the Musée national Cirta. Over a dozen of the most notable inscriptions were later published in Kanaanäische und Aramäische Inschriften and are known as 106-116 (Punic) and 162-164 (Neo Punic).

== Judas steles ==
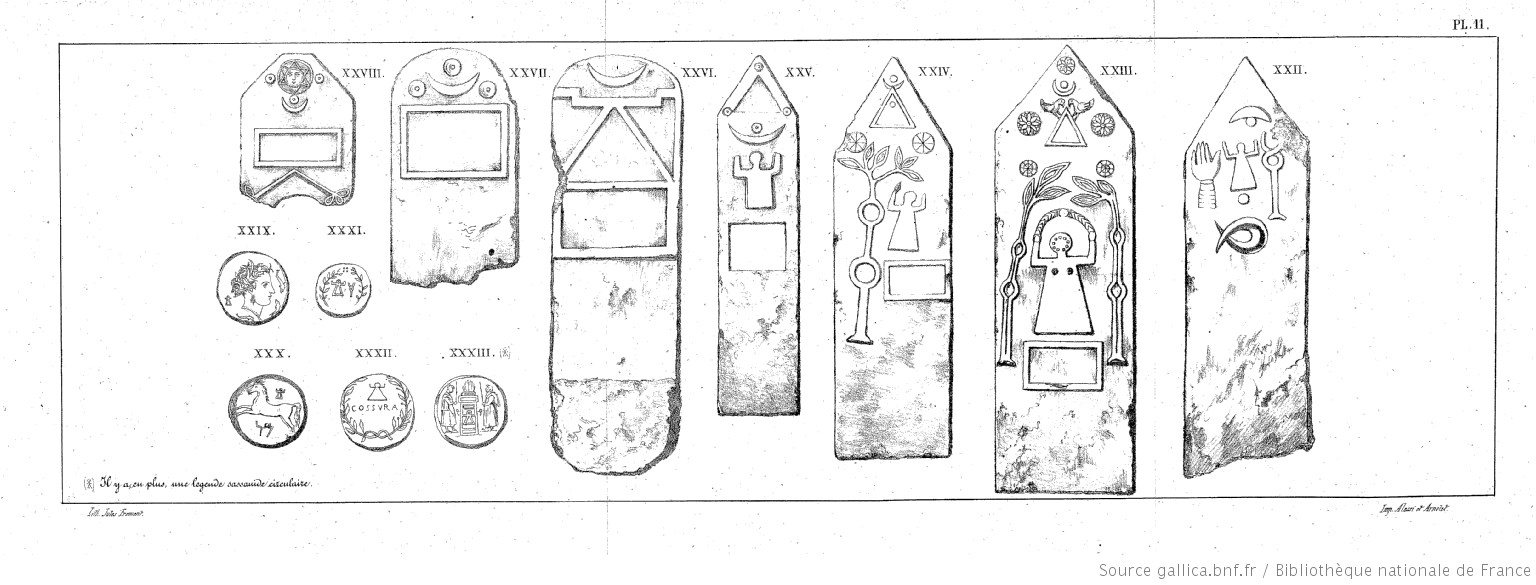
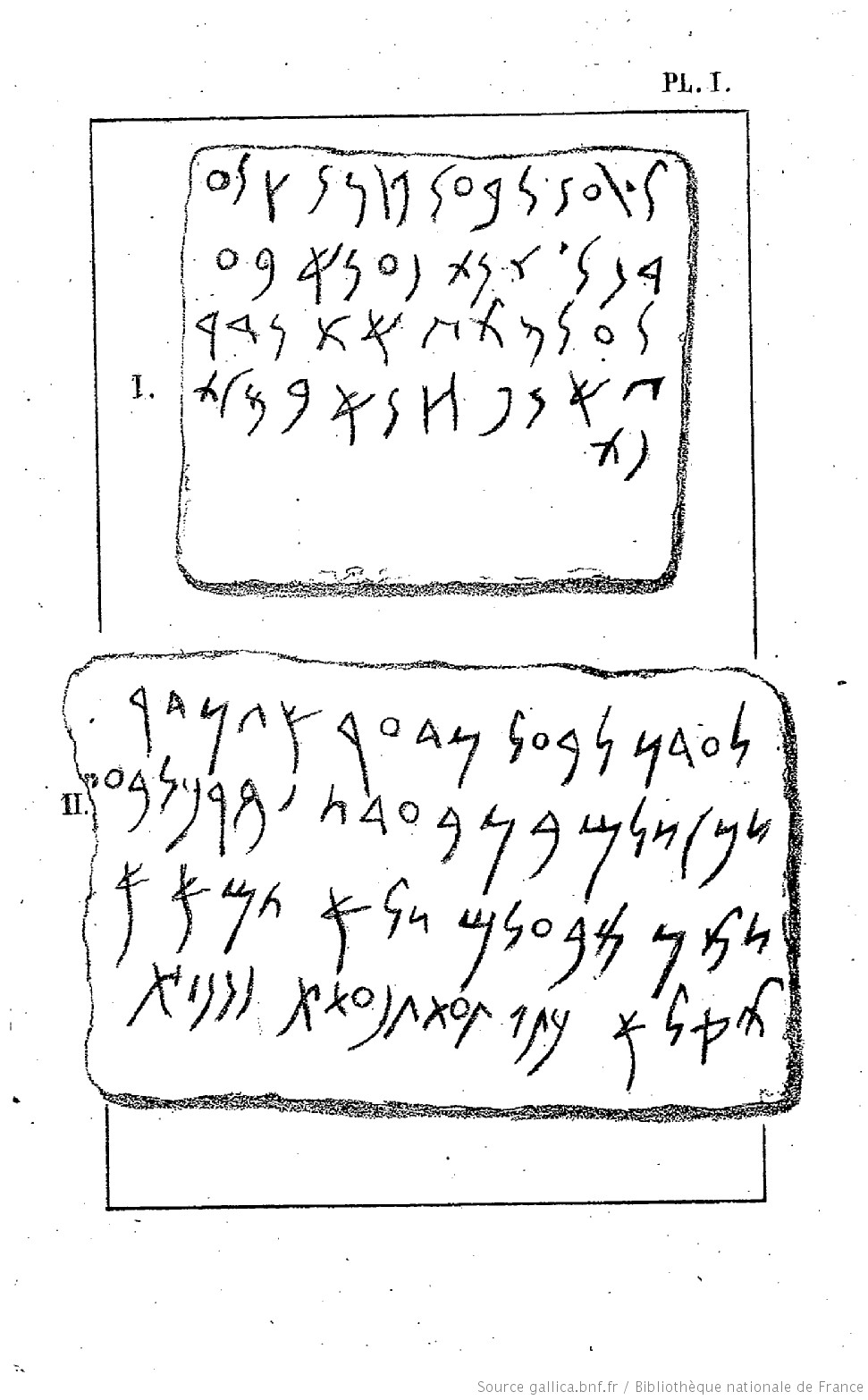
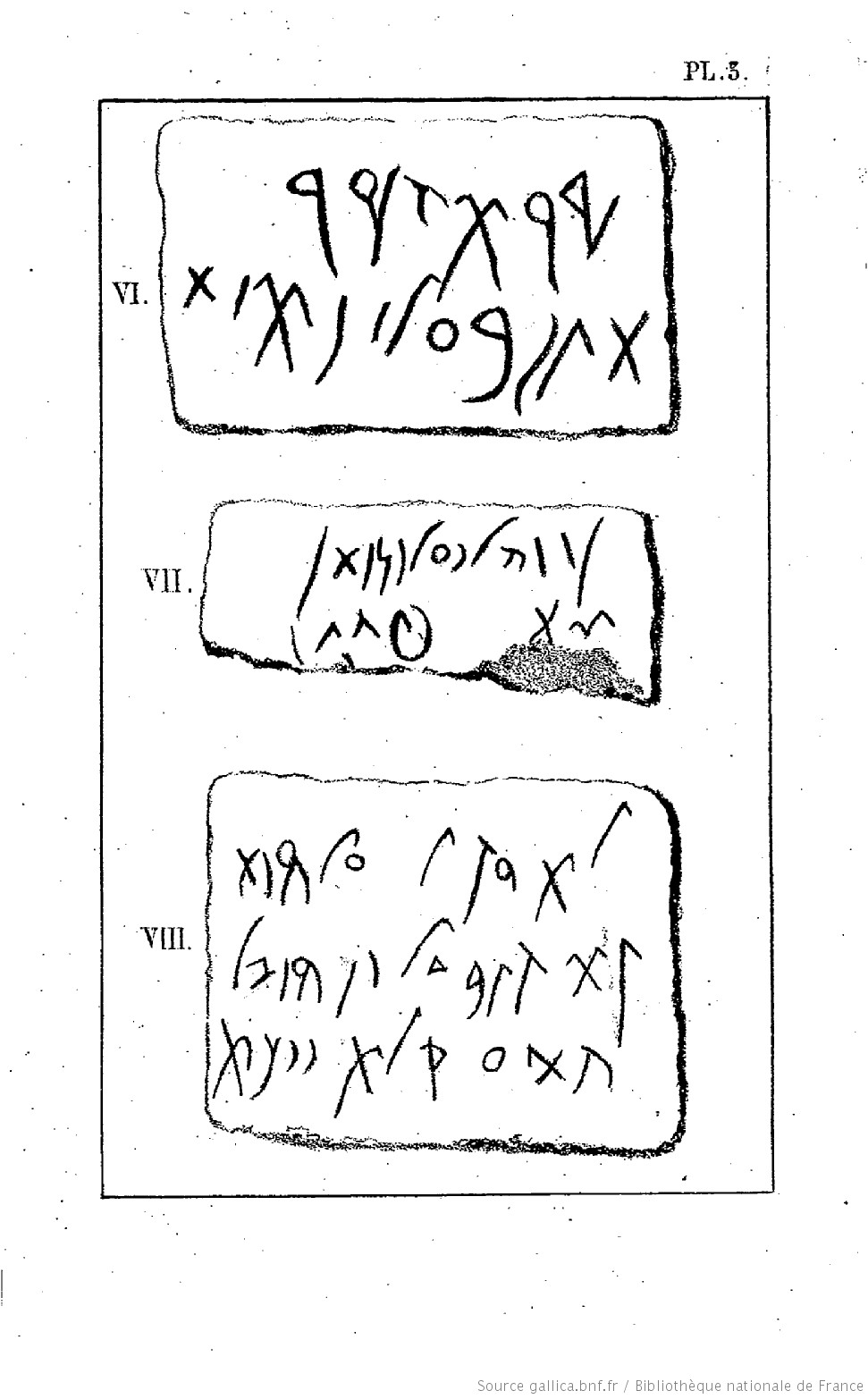
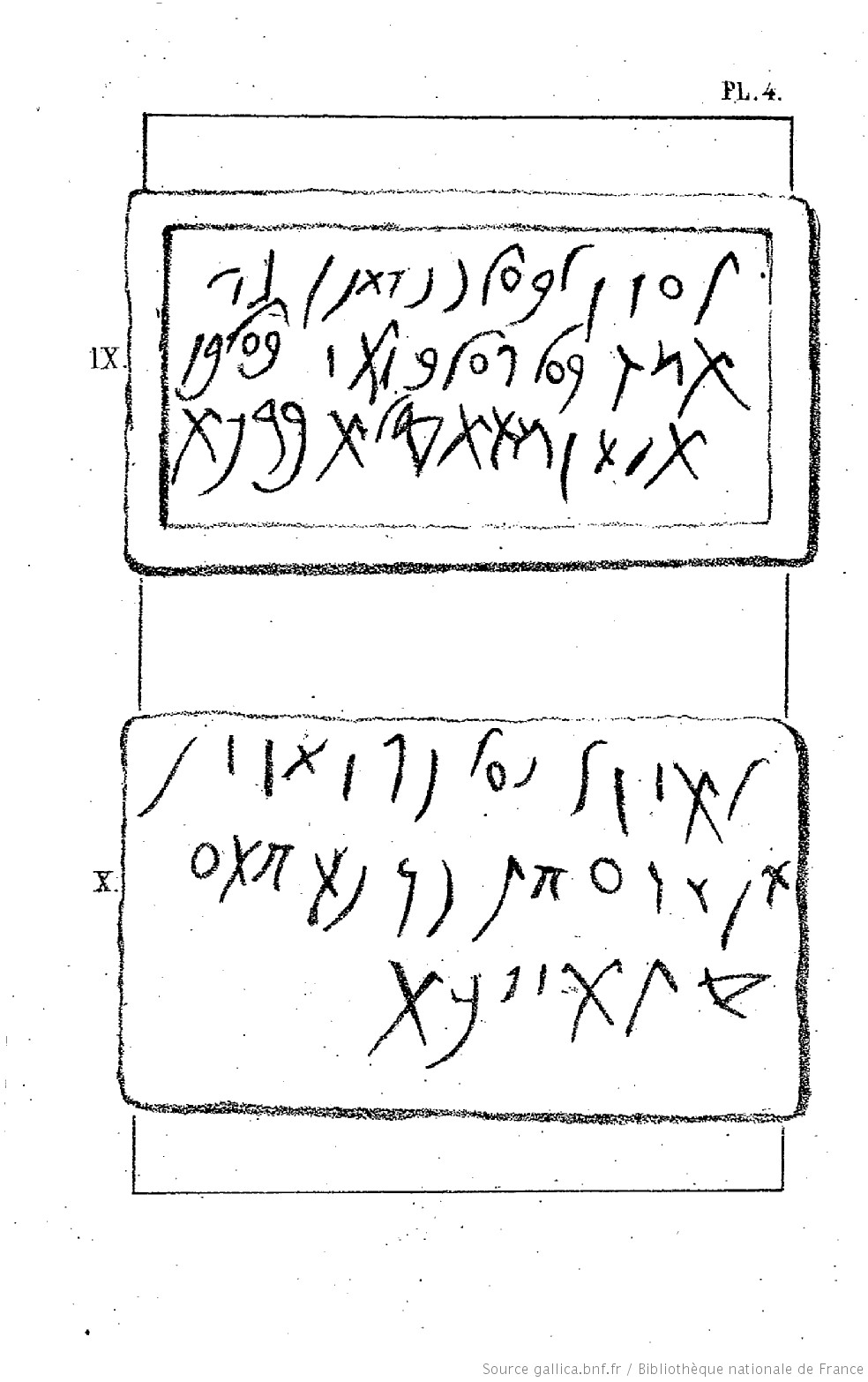
Selection of inscribed steles published by Auguste Judas in 1861 (steles shown without inscriptions); example inscriptions shown separately

In 1861 Auguste Celestin Judas published a series of 19 inscribed steles in the Annuaire de la Société archéologique de la province de Constantine. Between 1857 and 61 more than 30 such steles had been collected by the Archaeological Society, of which a dozen in 1860 alone. Judas noted that the locations of the finds had been difficult to ascertain, his understanding was as follows:

Of the nineteen inscriptions of which I have spoken, two, nos. II and XVII, come from Coudiat-ati; sixteen from the location of the new Christian cemetery, to the west and 500 meters from Coudiat-ati, 725 meters from Constantine. For number I, no indication.

== Costa steles ==
=== Overview ===
On the death of Lazare Costa, Antoine Héron de Villefosse and Dr Reboud negotiated the acquisition of all of Costa's steles for the Louvre. Although not all the steles made it to the Louvre, more were found.

=== Concordance ===
A concordance of 135 of the steles was published by Jean-Baptiste Chabot in 1917, and later by the Louvre in 1987.

Costa	AO	Bertrandy	RES	KAI	KI	NE 433-434
1 = 44	5198	30				
2	5189	22	1551			
3	5196	28	1550			9
4	5242	74				
5	5275	107	1549			
6 or 5 bis	27606	133				
7	5259	91	1565			12
8	5234	66	334	105	98	
9	5258	90				
10	5201	33	1553			
11	5264	96				
12	5281	113				
13	5279	111	1552			
14	5225	57				
15	5306	123				
16	5191	23	328			
17	5308	125	333			
18	5307	124	337			
19	5309	126	1564			11
20	5240	72				
21	5261	93				
22	5211	43				
23	5311	128	330			
24	5268	100				
25	5200	32	1554		94	7
26	5310	127				
26 bis	5270	102				
27	27608	135				
28	1024	13	1558			5
29	5186	19				
30	5226	58	1559			
31	5197	29	327	104	97	
32	5269	101	329			
33	5247	79				
34	5232	64				
35	5257	89				
36	5227	59	1562			
37	5272	104				
38	5210	42				
39	5252	84				
40	5203	35				
41	5284	114				
42	5260	92				
43	5221	53				
45	5075	16				
46		(lost)				
47	5208	40				
48	5230	62				
49	5280	112				
51	5224	56				
52	27607	134				
53	5235	67				
53 bis	5295	116				
54	5209	41	1555			2
55	5217	49				
56	5195	27				
57	27605	132				
58	5223	55				
59	5220	52	1561			
60	5215	47	1560			
61	5305	122				
62	5263	95				
63	5213	45				
63 bis	5229	61				
64	5205	37				
65	5273	105				
66	5233	65				
67	5304	121				
68	5194	26				
69	5256	88				
70	5266	98	1556			
71	5216	48	1557			
72	5231	63				
73	5262	94				
74	5255	87	336		99	
75	5249	81	340			
76	5192	24	1563			4
77	5251	83				
78	5276	108				
79	1026	15				
80	5253	85				
81	1020	9	1535			
82	5212	44				
83	5278	110				
84	5301	118				
85	5222	54				
86	5238	70				
87	5218	50				
88	5248	80				
89	5219	51				
90		(lost)				
91	1018	7	1536			3
92	5312	129				
93	1023	12	339	103		10
94	1013	2	1537			
95	5188	21				
96	1021	10	1538			
97	5314	131				
98	1015	4	338 and 1539			
99	1016	5	1540			
100	5193	25	335			
102	5245	77				
103	5250	82	332			
104	1017	6	1542			
105	5202	34				
106	5246	78				
107		(lost)				
108	5244	76				
109	5207	39				
110	5204	36				
111	5237	69				
112	1014	3	1546			
113	1019	8	1547			
114	5302	119	1548			
115	1025	14				
116	5271	103				
117	5243	75				
118	5206	38				
119	5214	46				
120	5239	71				
121	5236	68				
122	5254	86				
123	5241	73				
124	5300	117				
125	5199	31				
126	5142	17				
127	5313	130				
128	5187	20				
129	5303	120				
130	5274	106				
131	5277	109				
132	1012	1	1544	102	95	8
133	1022	11	1545			6
134	5228	60				
135	5289	115				
	5092	140				
	5099	141				
	5115	142				
	5185	18	1541			
	5265	97				
	5267	99				
	5282	136				
	5285	137				
	5286	138				
	5287	139				

=== Gallery ===
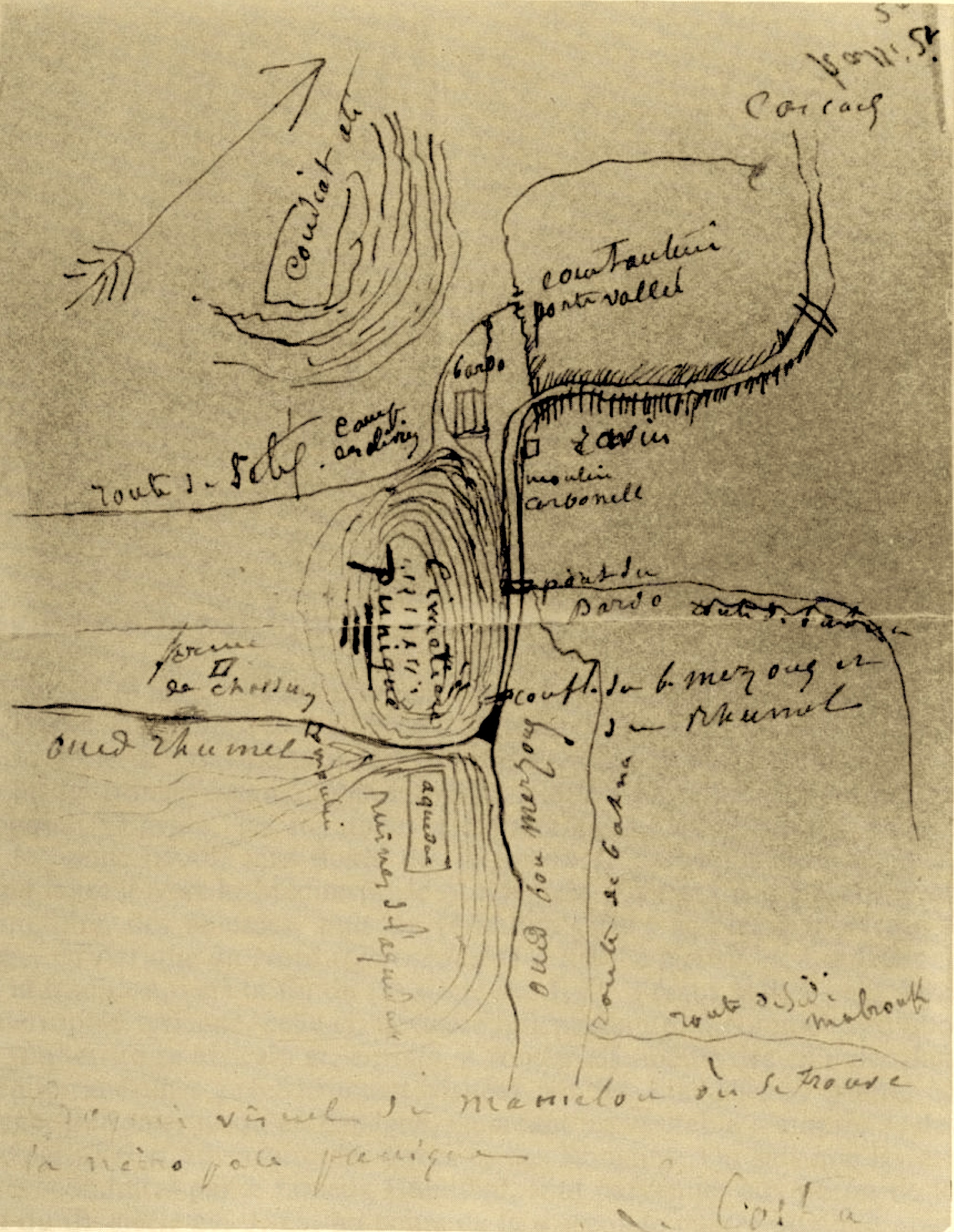
Lazare Costa's manuscript map showing the location of his discoveries

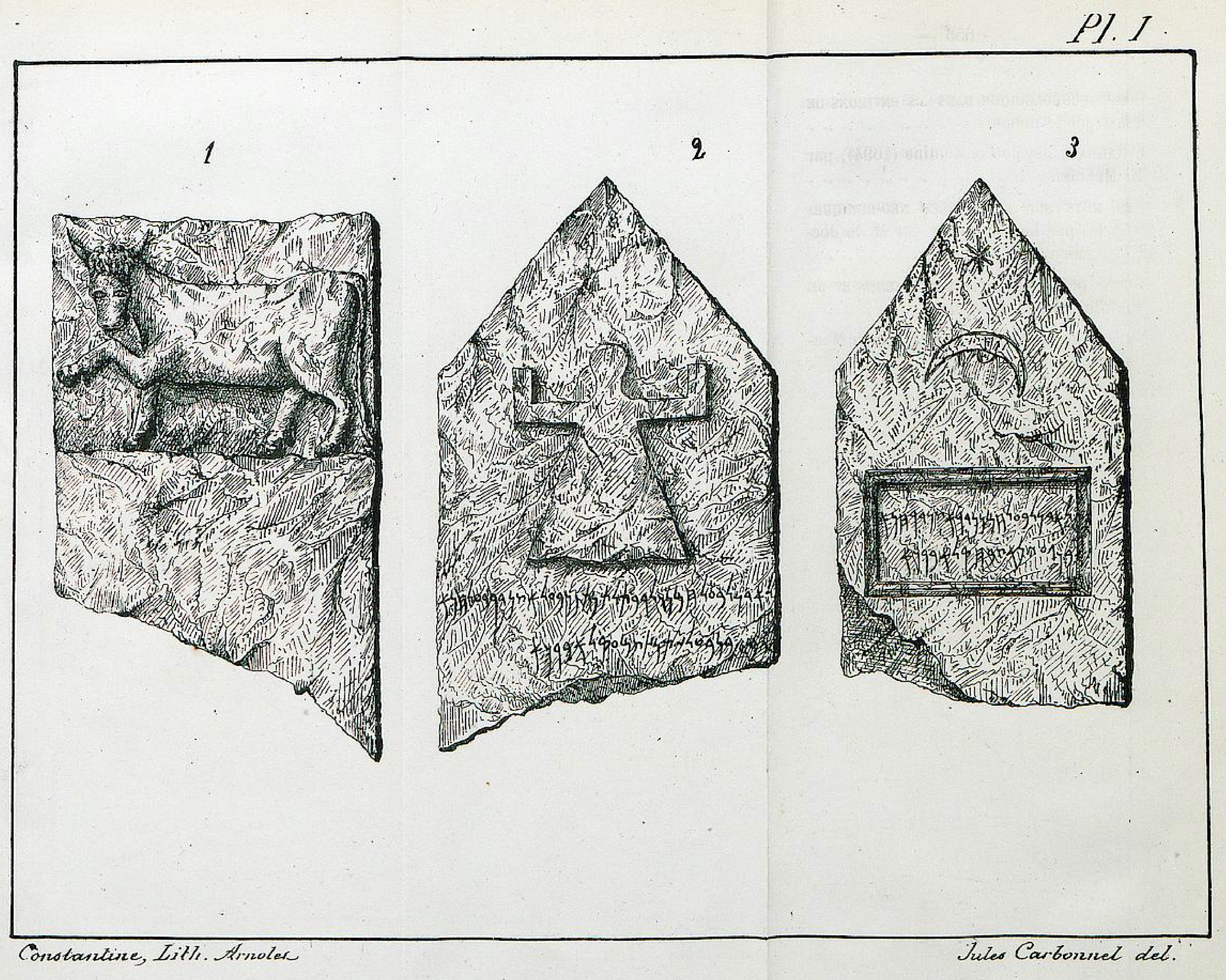
Inscriptions 1-3 (at the Louvre: AO 1026, AO 1020, AO 1018)

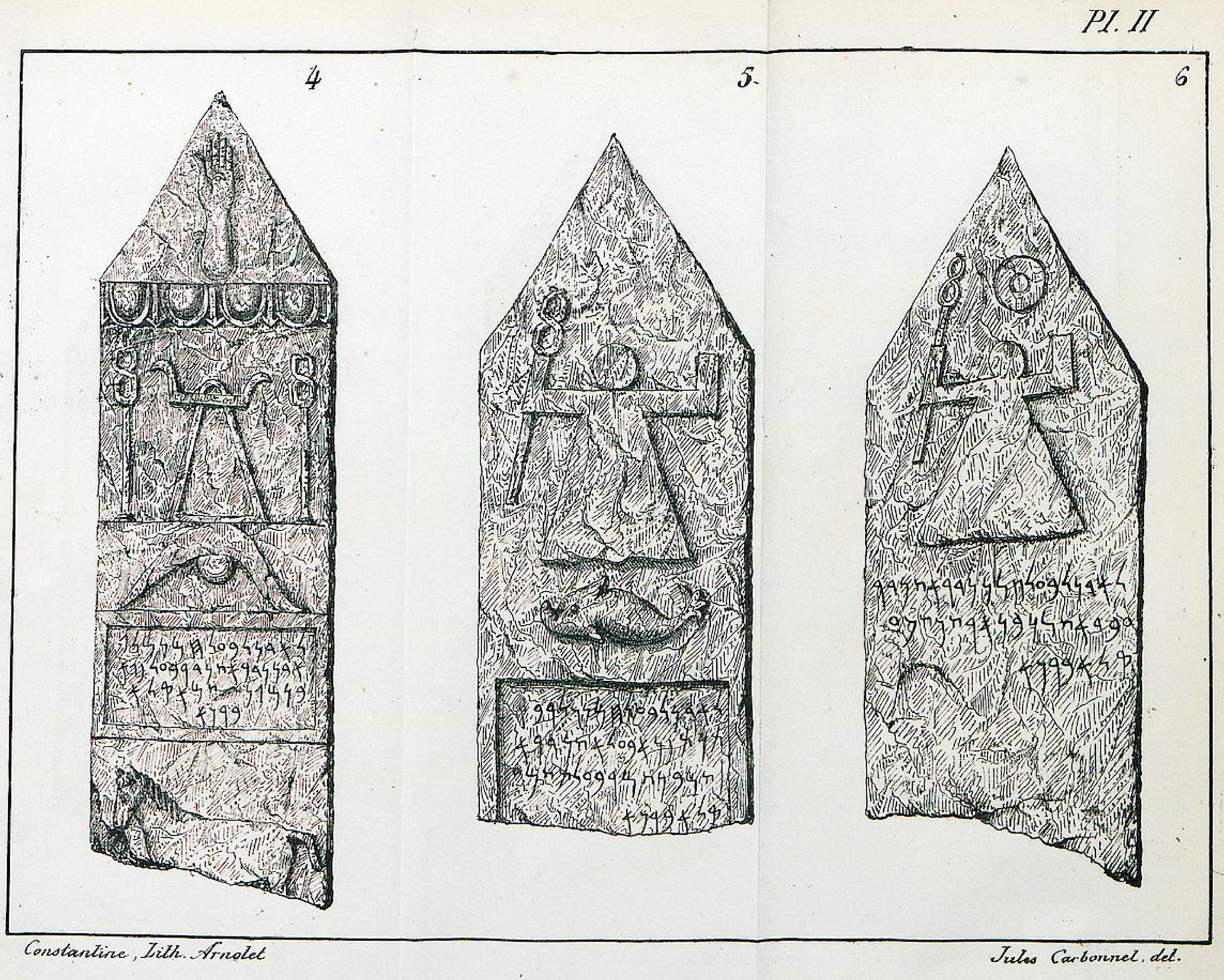
Inscriptions 4-6 (Costa 6 is RES 331)

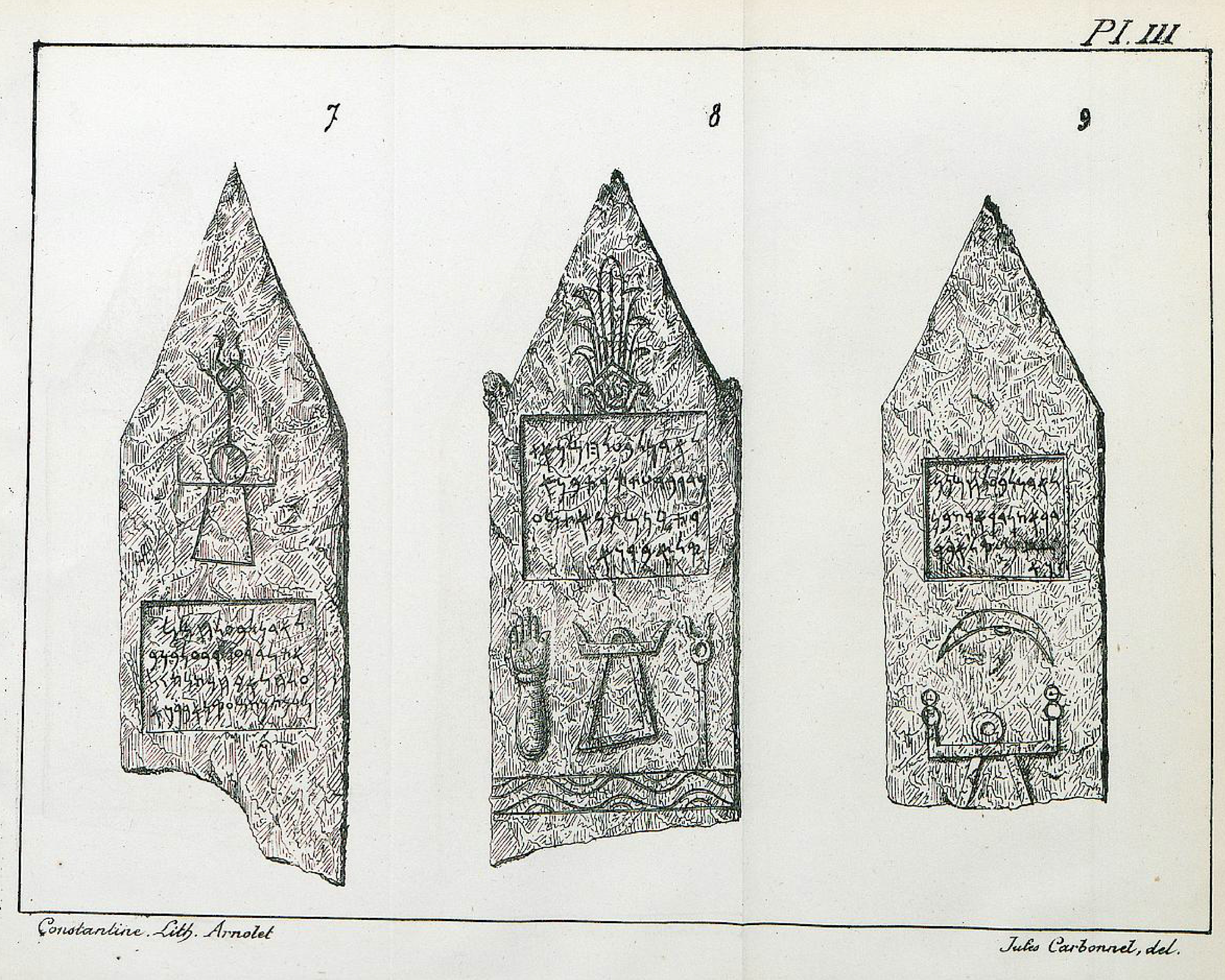
Inscriptions 7-9 (Costa 8 is KAI 105 / RES 334 / KI 98 / NSI 51)

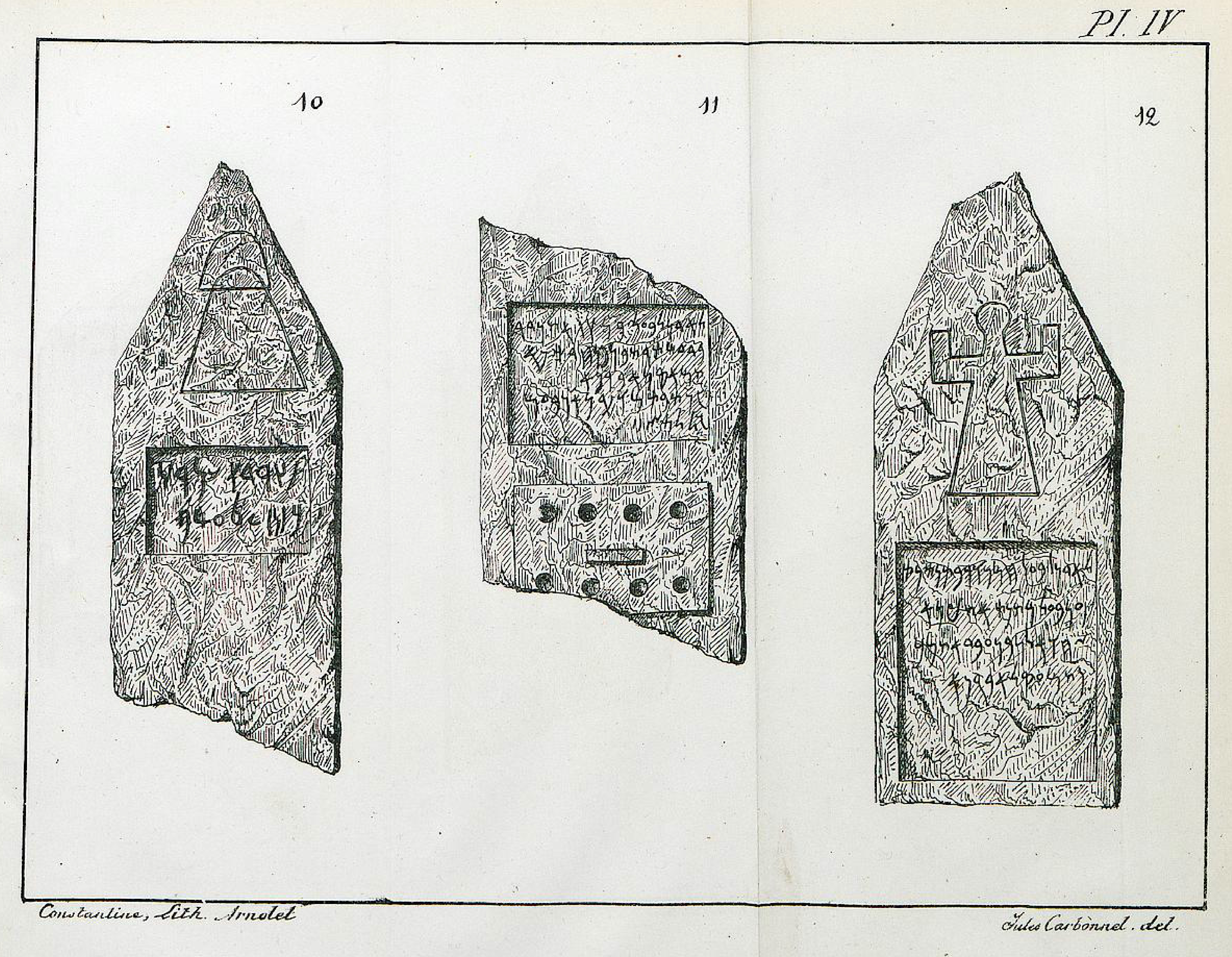
Inscriptions 10-12

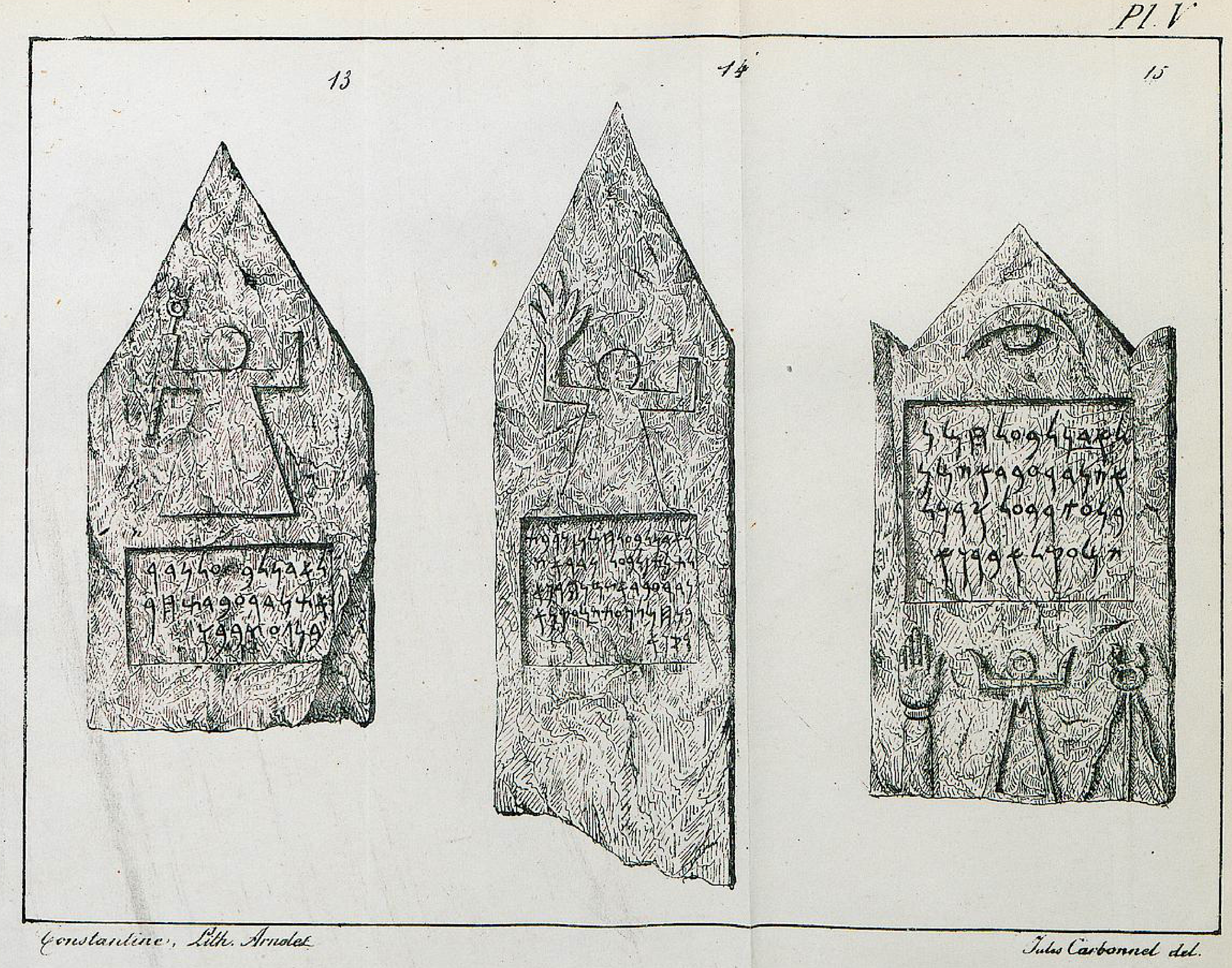
Inscriptions 13-15 (at the Louvre: AO 1019)

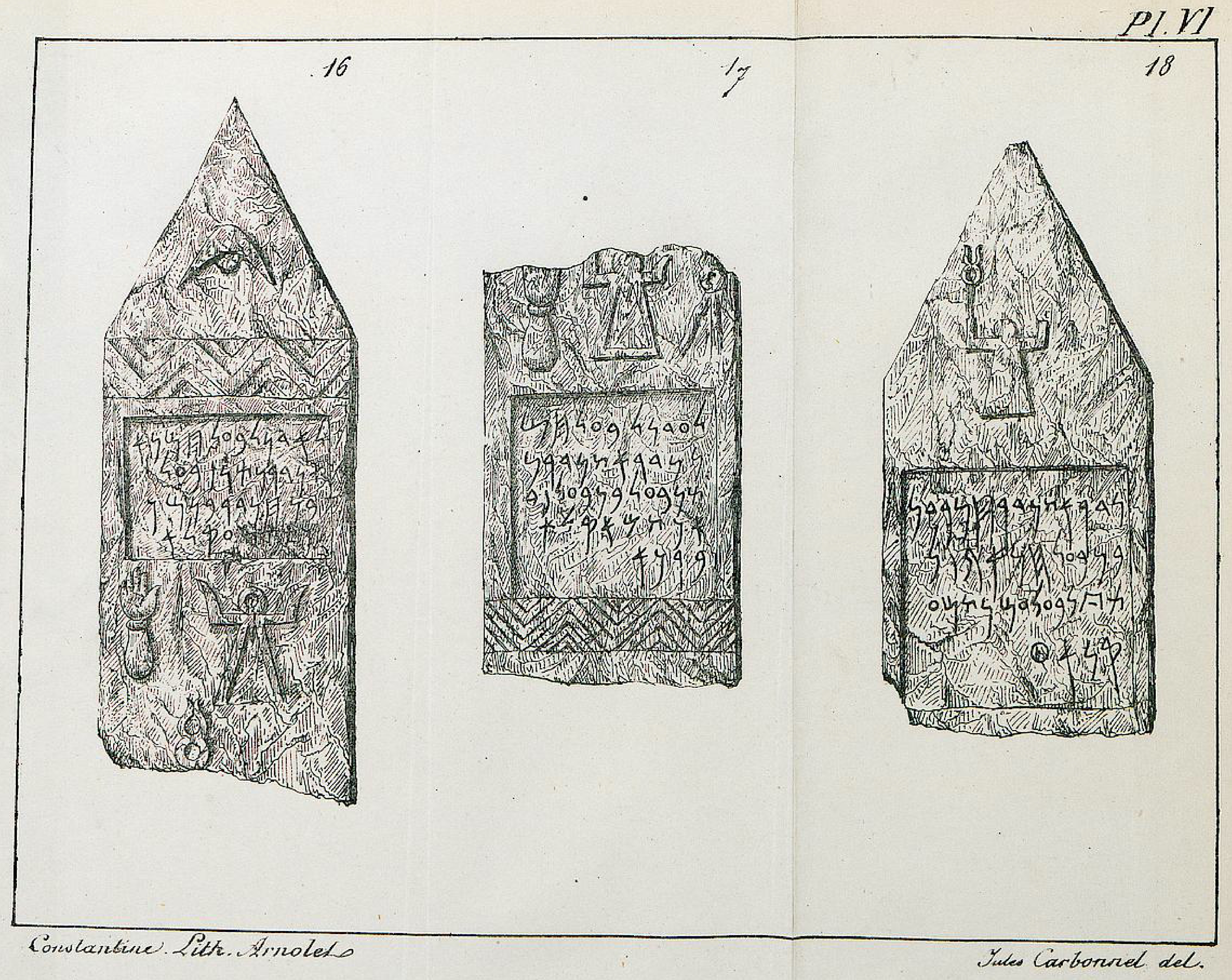
Inscriptions 16-18 (Costa 16 is RES 328, Costa 17 is RES 333)

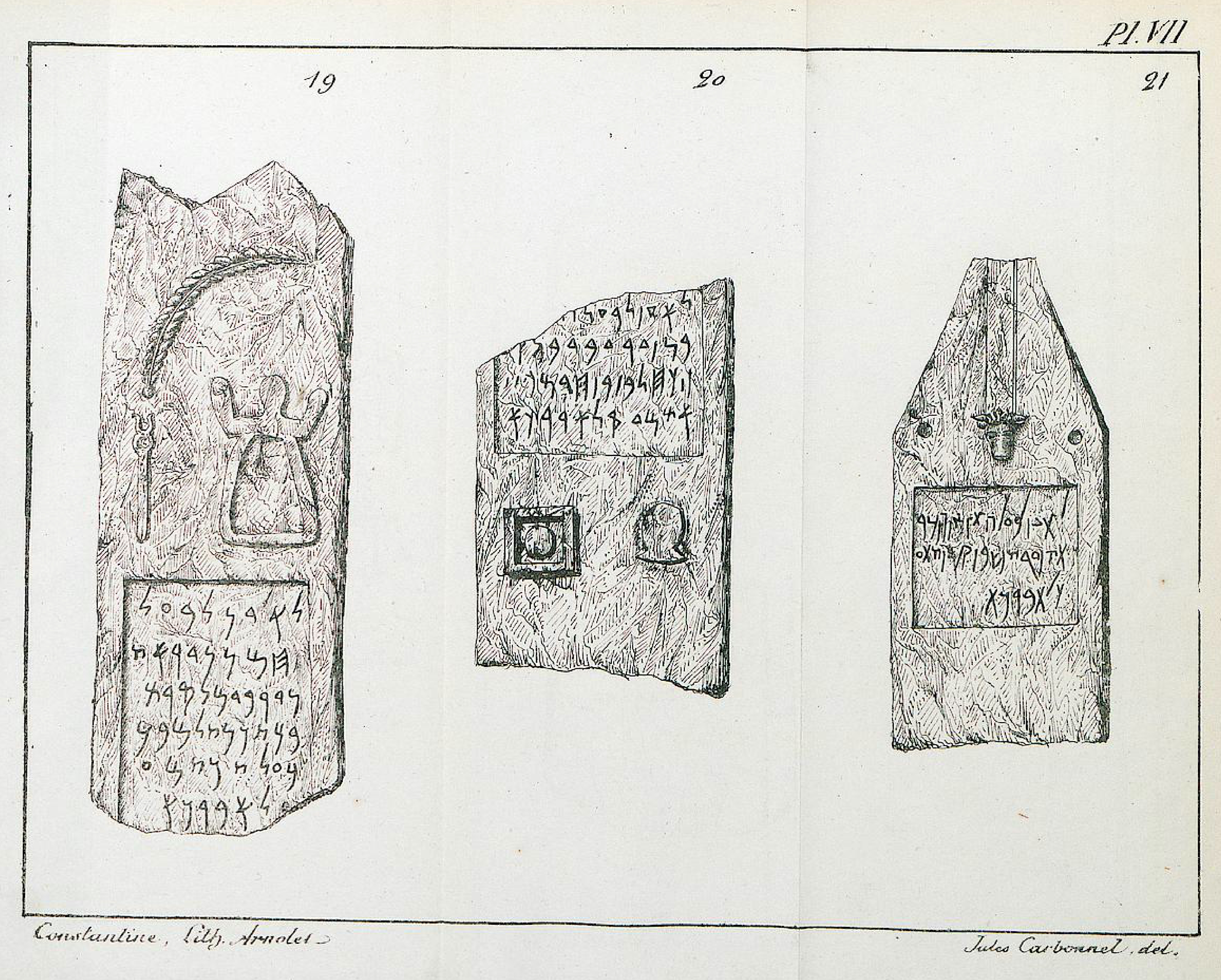
Inscriptions 19-21

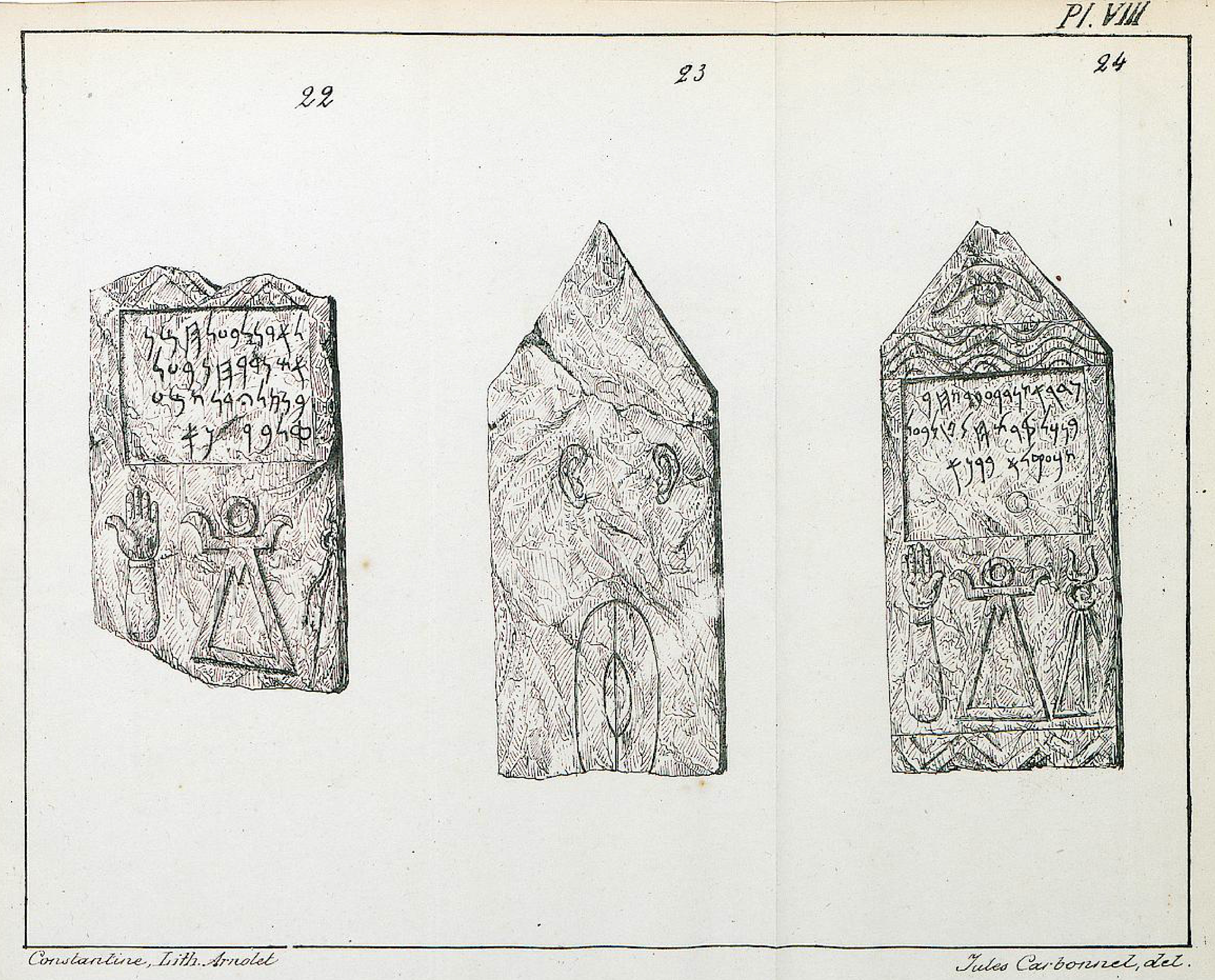
Inscriptions 22-24 (Costa 22 is RES 330, and Costa 24 is RES 326)

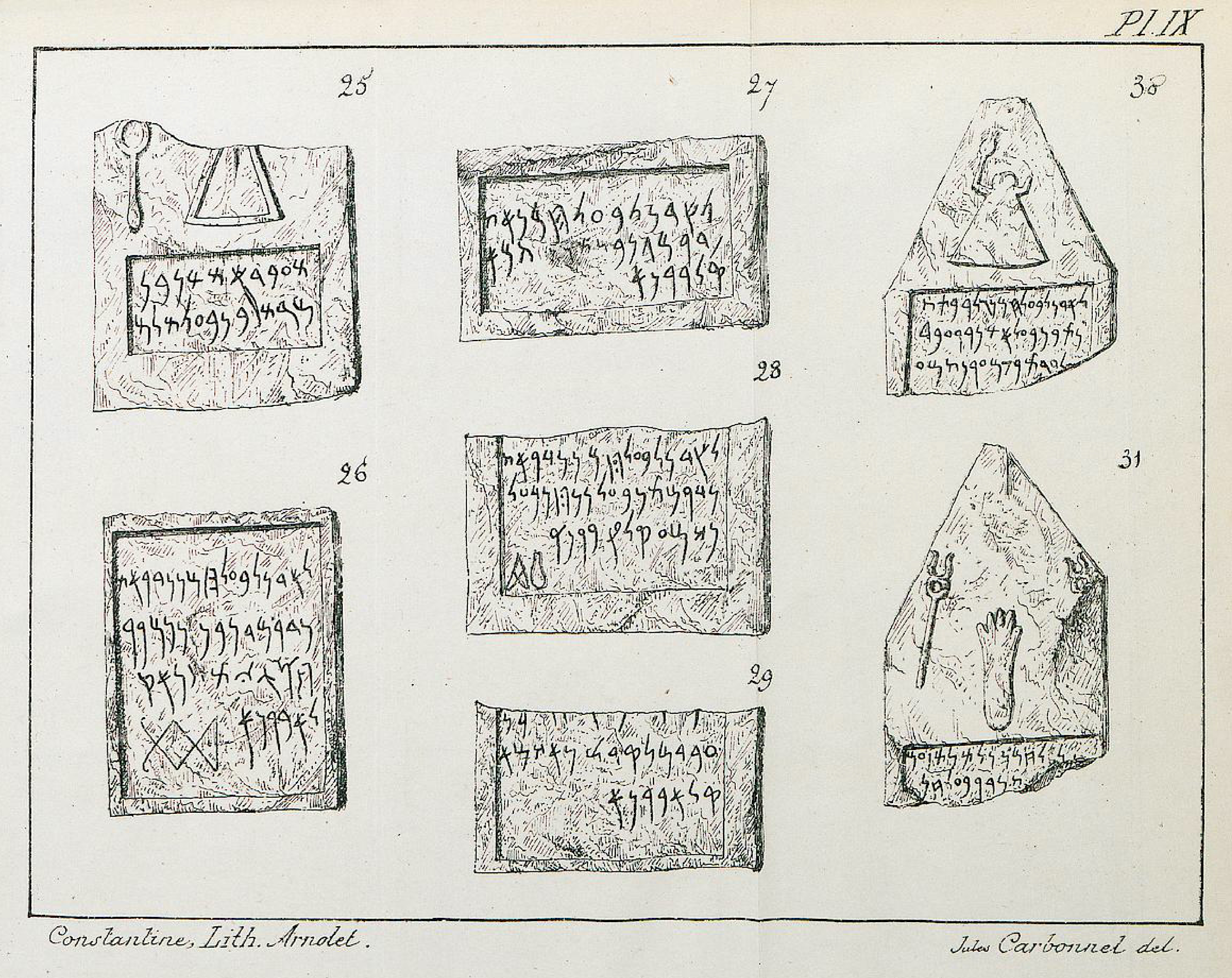
Inscriptions 25-31 (Costa 31 is KAI 104 / RES 327 / KI 97)

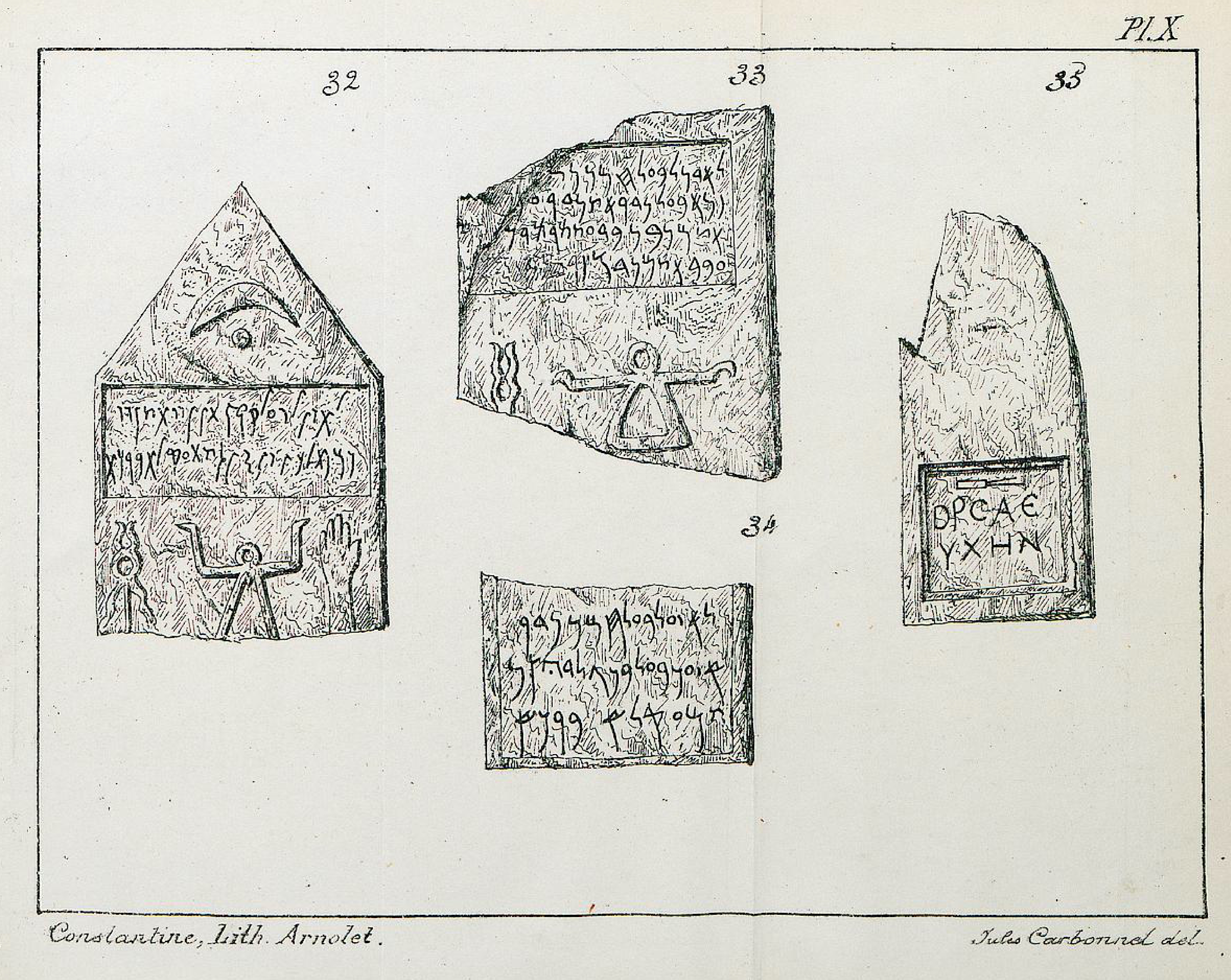
Inscriptions 32-35 (Costa 33 is RES 329)

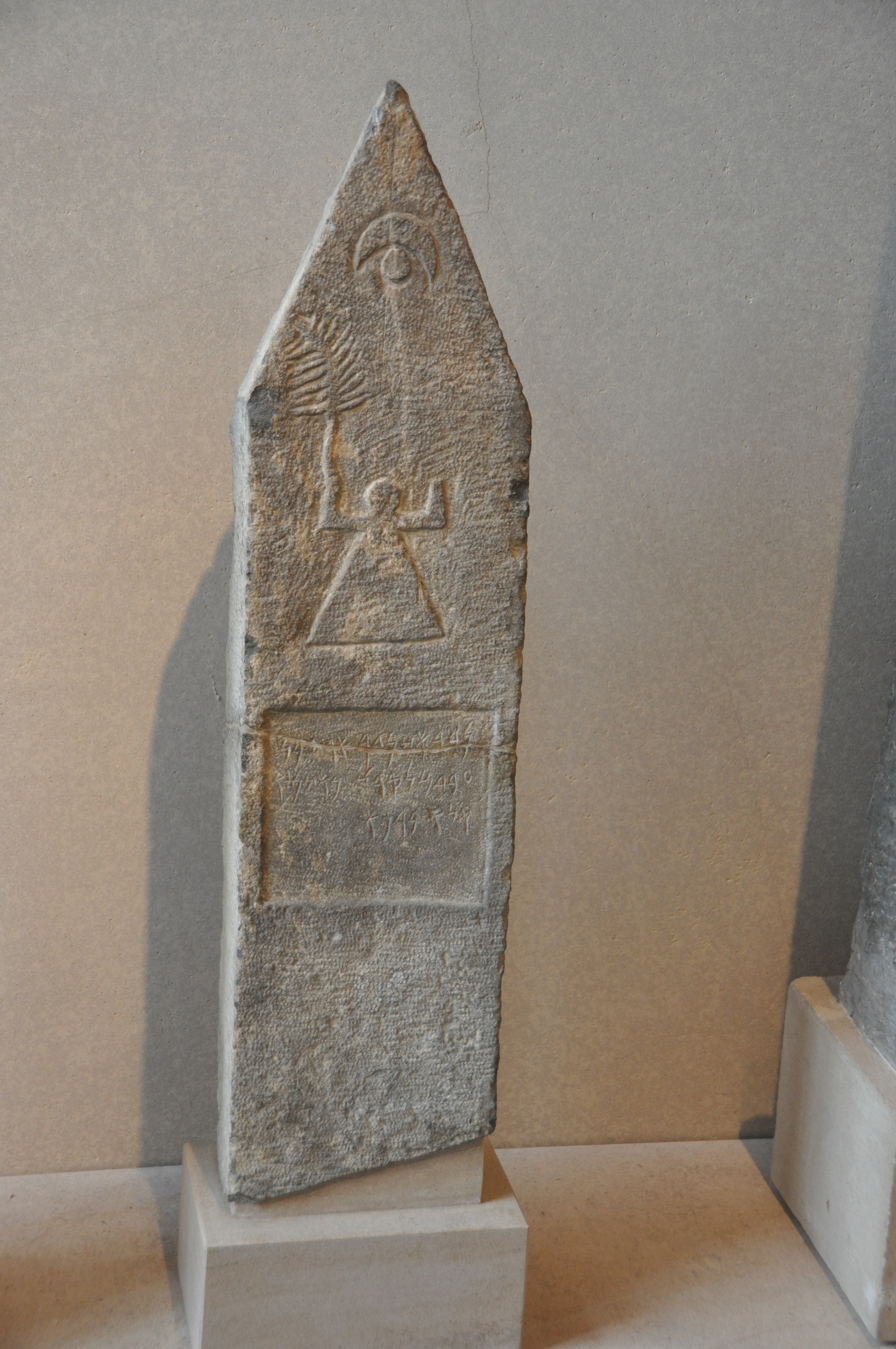
AO 5226 on display at the Louvre

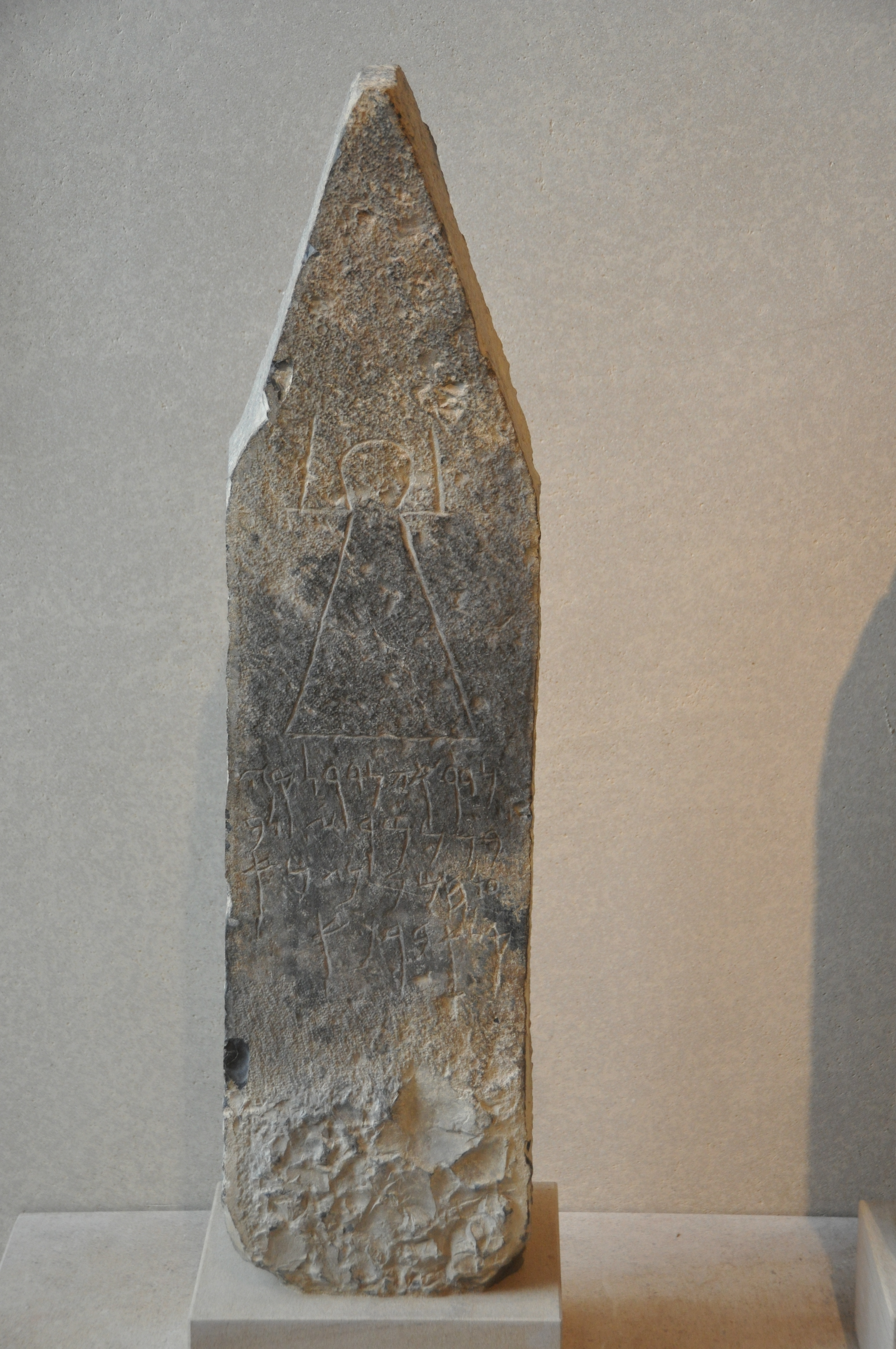
AO 5187 on display at the Louvre

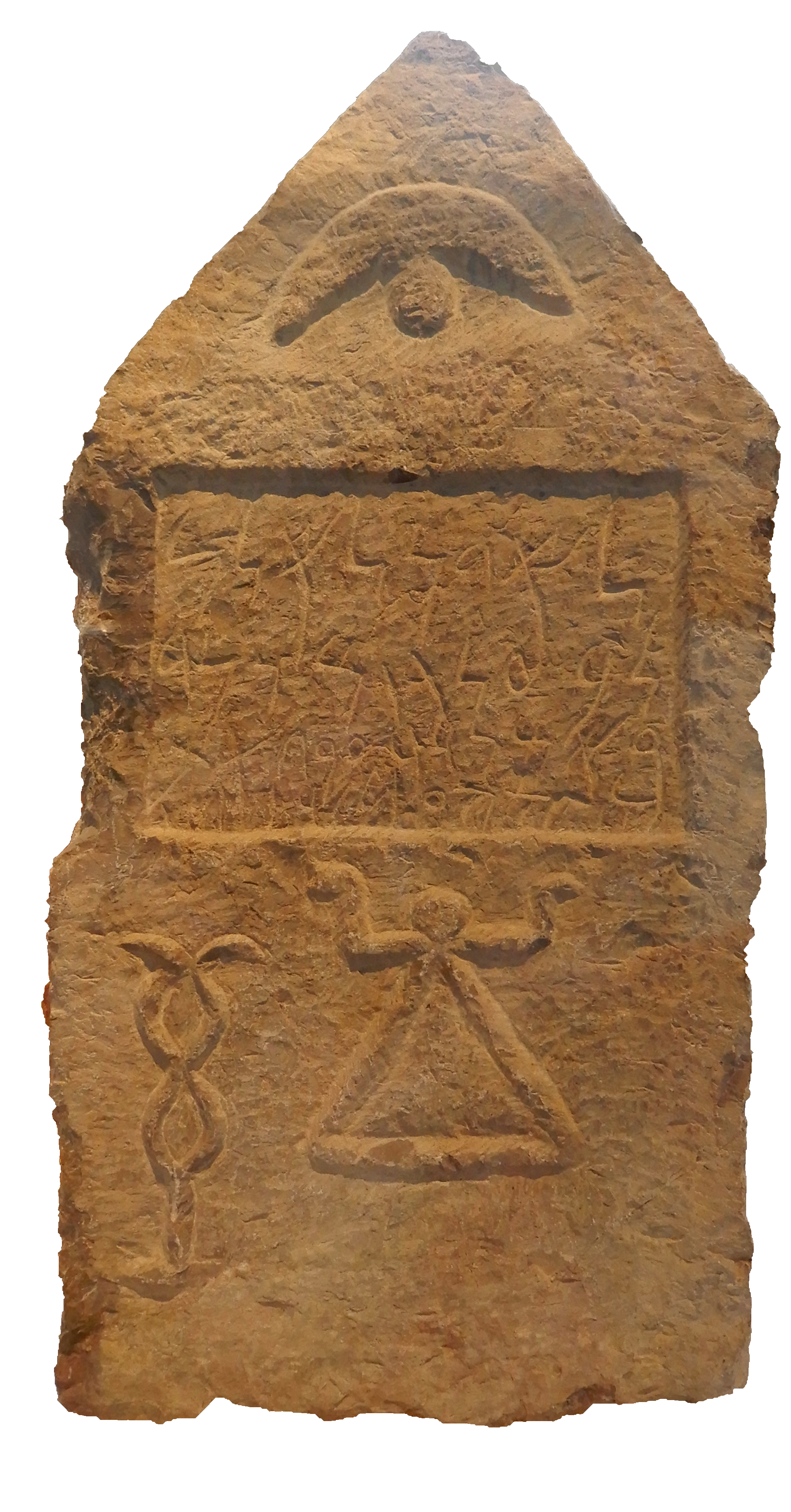
AO 5191 on display at the Louvre

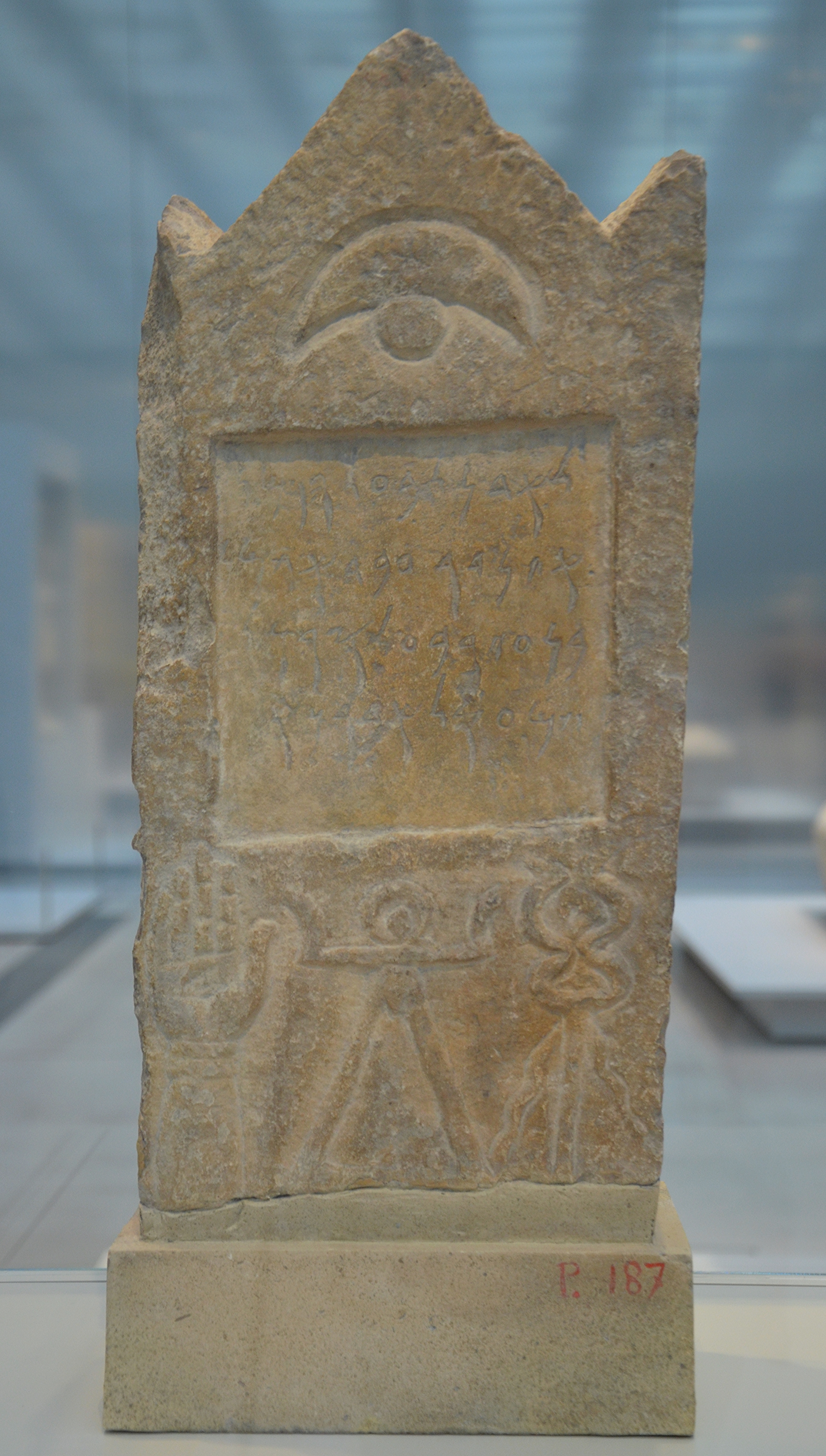
"Costa 15" in the Louvre-Lens

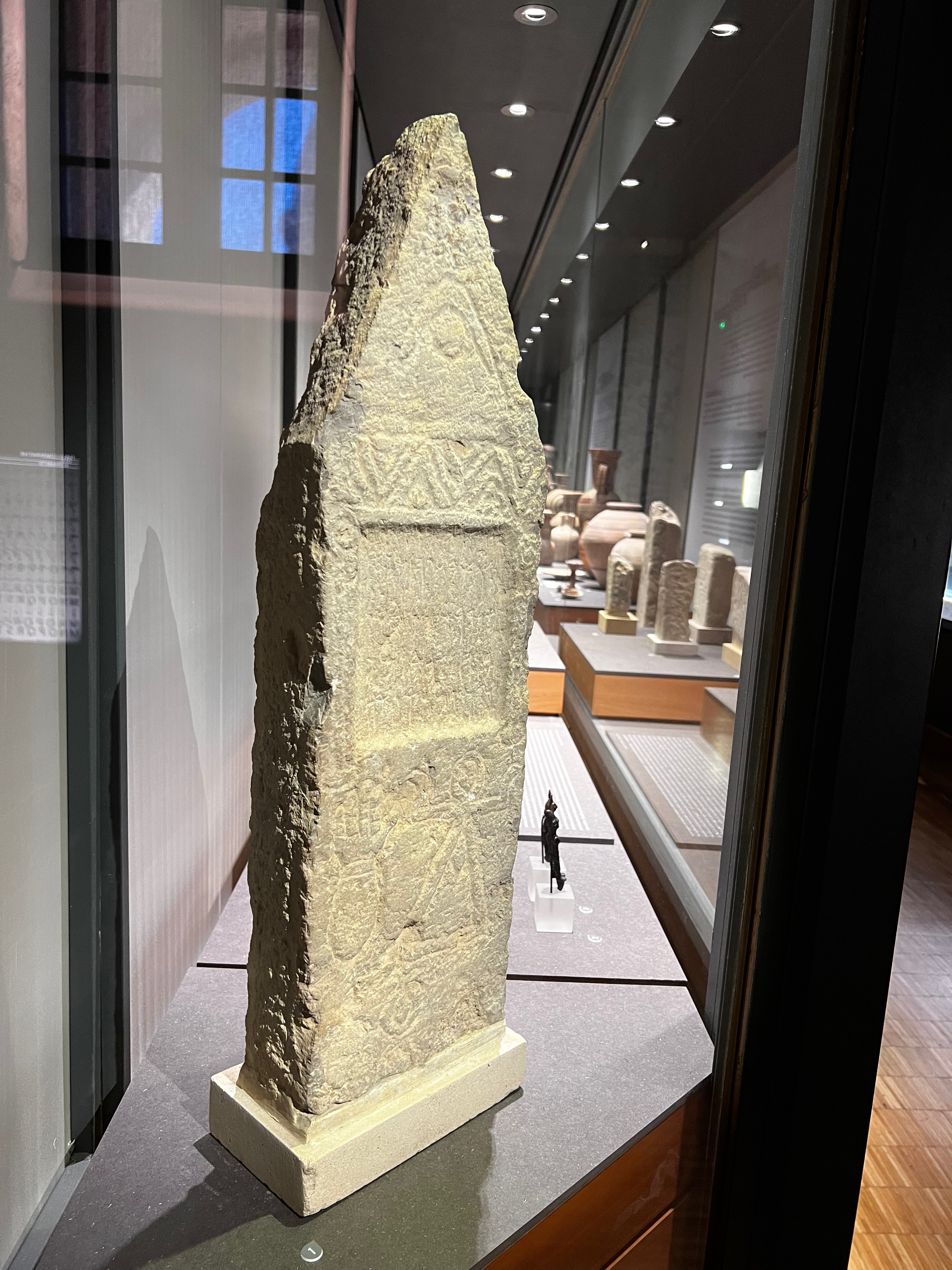
Costa 16 on display at the Musée d'archéologie méditerranéenne, Marseille

== Berthier steles ==
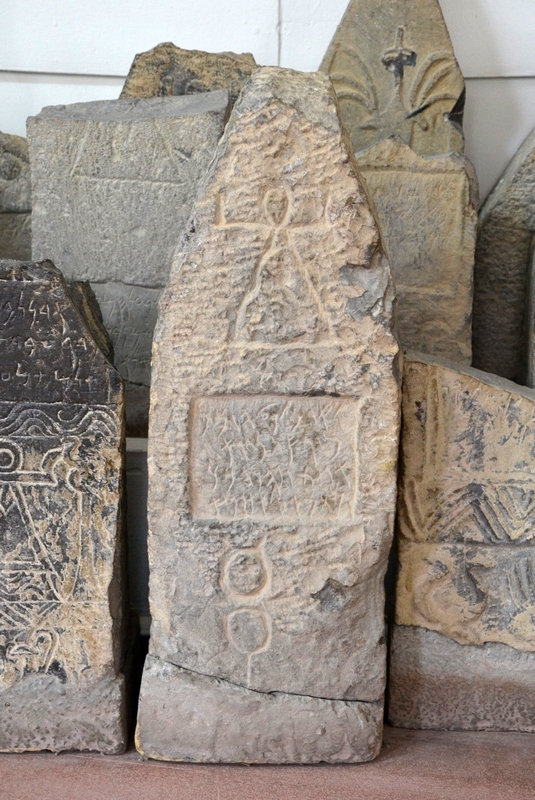
One of the Berthier steles at the Musée national Cirta

=== Overview ===
At the southern exit of the city, on the El Hofra hill, about 150 m (490 ft) southeast of what was then the "Transatlantic Hotel" (today a branch of the Crédit populaire d'Algérie), the construction of a large Renault garage (today Garage Sonacome) was begun in spring 1950. The hill is at the confluence of the Rhumel River and its tributary Oued Bou Merzoug, just south of the Salah Bey Viaduct. On May 6, 1950, the excavator struck a mass of stelae grouped over a length of about 75 m (246 ft), laid flat and forming a kind of wall whose height did not exceed the thickness of four stelae while the width varied from 0.5–1 m (1 ft 8 in – 3 ft 3 in).

The stelae were not found in situ: all appear to have been broken with intention (all were broken and many of the inscriptions were mutilated), and then transported to a sort of dumping ground.

By September 1950, about 500 fragments had been found, more than half of which bearing inscriptions; in total 700 stelae and fragments were found, of which 281 were Punic and neo-Punic stelae, totally or partially legible, 17 were Greek inscriptions and 7 were Latin inscriptions. Almost all the steles were published by Berthier and Charlier, except for three – one long Punic inscription which was too faint, and two Neo Punic inscriptions which were later published by James Germain Février (KAI 162–163).

Some are dated to the reign of Massinissa or the reign of his sons; they range from 163-2 BCE until 148-7 (the year of Massinissa's death) and perhaps until 122-1 (under Micipsa). Number 63 (KAI 112) mentions the simultaneous reign of the three sons of Massinissa – Micipsa, Gulussa and Mastanabai, and one of the stelae contains a complete transliteration of a Punic text in Greek characters (page 167).

== Bibliography ==
- BERTHIER André - CHARLIER René, 1952–55, Le sanctuaire punique d'El-Hofra à Constantine. 2 volumes
  - Février, James Germain [in French] (1955). "Review: Le sanctuaire punique d'El Hofra à Constantine, par André Berthier et René Charlier. Préface d'Albert Grenier, membre de l'Institut, 1955". Revue des Études Anciennes. 57 (3–4): 410–412.
- Bertrandy, François; Sznycer, Maurice; Caubet, Annie; Gautier, Jeanne; Marcillet-Jaubert, Jean (1987). Les stèles puniques de Constantine (in French) (FeniXX ed.). Musée du Louvre, département des Antiquités orientales Réunion des musées nationaux - Grand Palais. ISBN 978-2-7118-7714-0.
- MacKendrick, P.L. (2000). The North African Stones Speak. University of North Carolina Press. p. 194. ISBN 978-0-8078-4942-2.

== External sources ==
- The Lazare Costa steles at the Louvre
- Photos of the Berthier steles
