= Cirta =

Ancient Berber and Roman settlement

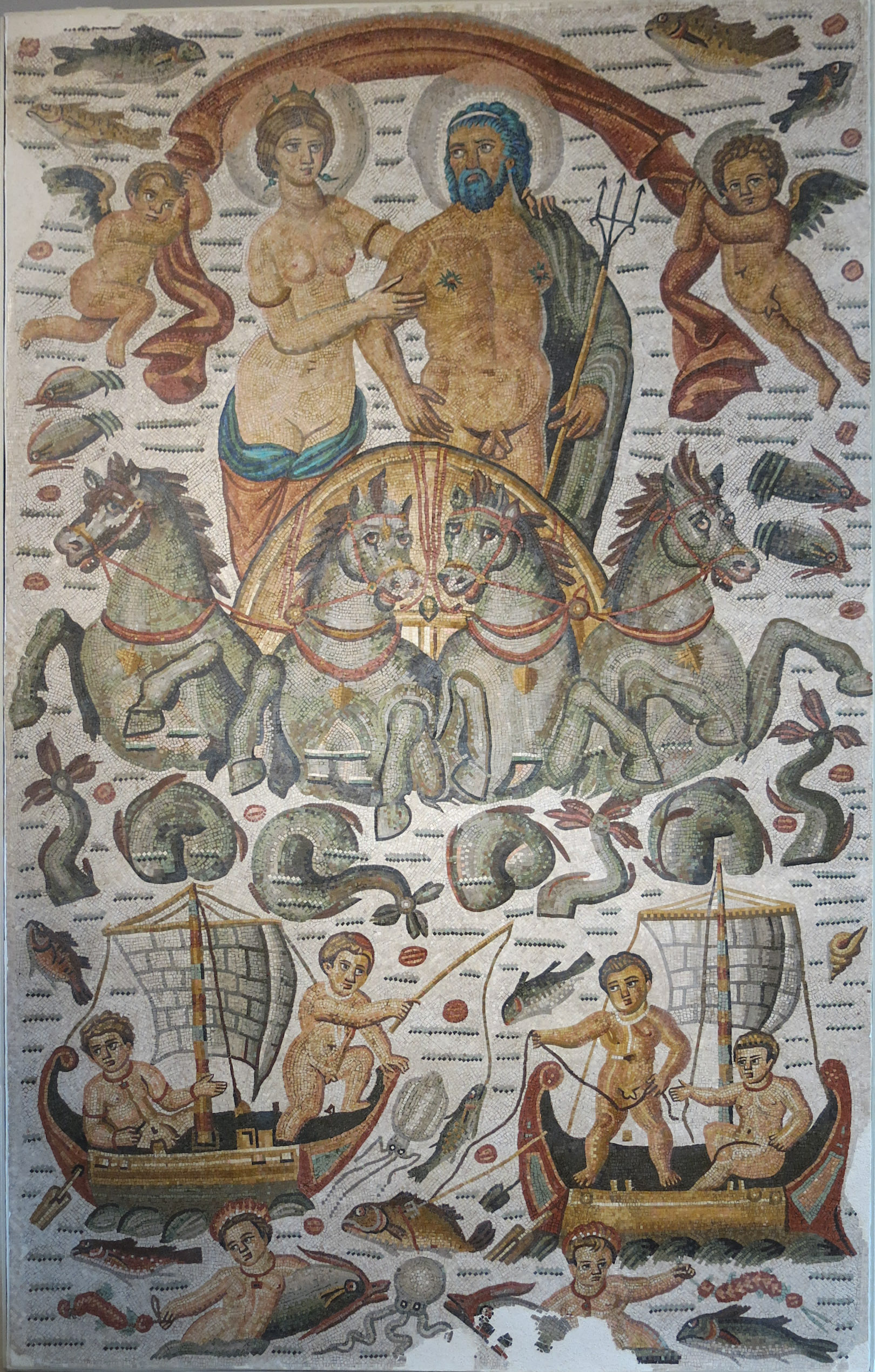
- Detail of Triumph of Neptune and Amphitrite (c. 315-325), a vast Roman mosaic from Cirta. Now in the Louvre

- Location within Algeria
- 36.3675°N 6.611944°E
- Location: Algeria
- Region: Constantine Province

Cirta, also known by various other names in antiquity, was the ancient Berber and Roman settlement which later became Constantine, Algeria.

Cirta was the capital city of the Berber kingdom of Numidia; its strategically important port city was Russicada. Although Numidia was a key ally of the ancient Roman Republic during the Punic Wars (264–146 BC), Cirta was subject to Roman invasions during the 2nd and 1st centuries BC. Eventually it fell under Roman dominion during the time of Julius Caesar. Cirta was then repopulated with Roman colonists by Caesar and Augustus and was surrounded by the autonomous territory of a "Confederation of Four Free Roman cities" (with Chullu, Russicada, and Milevum), ruled initially by Publius Sittius. The city was destroyed in the beginning of the 4th century and was rebuilt by the Roman emperor Constantine the Great, who gave his name to the newly constructed city, Constantine. The Vandals damaged the city, but Emperor Justinian I reconquered and improved it. It declined in importance after the Muslim invasions, but a small community continued at the site for several centuries. Its ruins are now an archaeological site.

A number of significant archaeological finds have been found in the area, including a large corpus of Punic inscriptions, known as the Cirta steles.

== Names ==
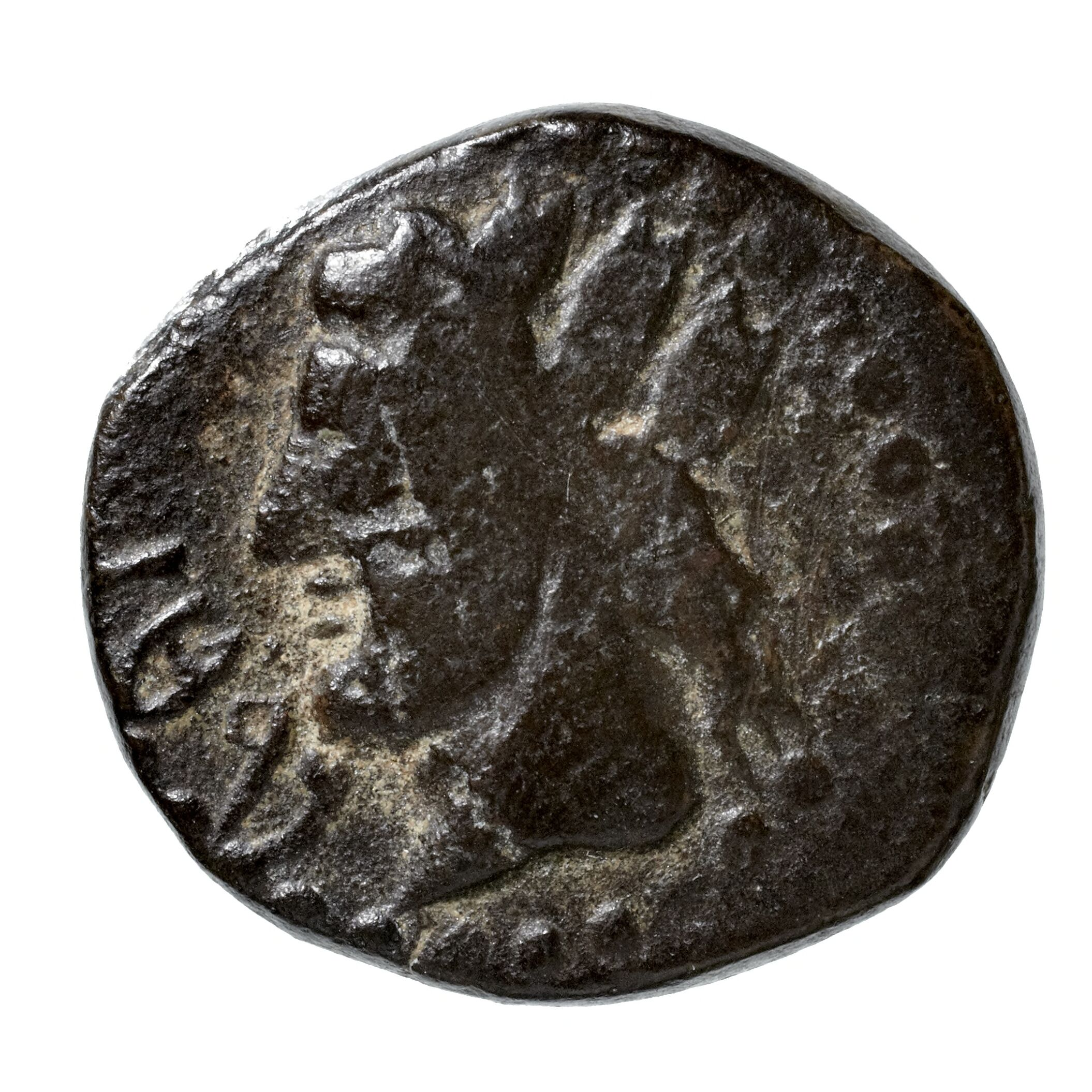
A coin from Cirta, bearing the Neo-Punic legend krṭn

The town's Punic name krṭn (𐤊𐤓𐤈𐤍, probably pronounced "Kirthan", with a hard, breathy /tʰ/ sound) is probably not the Punic word meaning "town", which was written with a Q (i.e., qoph) rather than a K (kaph). Instead, it is likely a Punic transcription of an existing Berber placename. This was later Latinized as Cirta. Under Julius Caesar, the Sittian settlement was known as Respublica IIII Coloniarum Cirtensium; Pliny also knew it as Cirta Sittianorum ("Cirta of the Sittians"). Under Augustus, in 27 or 30 BC, its official name was Colonia Julia Juvenalis Honoris et Virtutis Cirta; this was sometimes reduced to Cirta Julia ("Julian Cirta"), 'Colonia Cirta or simply Cirta. This name was rendered as Ancient Greek: Κίρτα, romanized: Kírta by the historians Diodorus Siculus, Polybius, Appian, Cassius Dio, and Procopius and by the geographers Ptolemy and Strabo.

After its refounding as Constantina (Latin: Civitas Constantina Cirtensium) by Constantine the Great after AD 312, Cirta became known as Constantine. Following its Muslim conquest, it was known as Qusantina.

== History ==
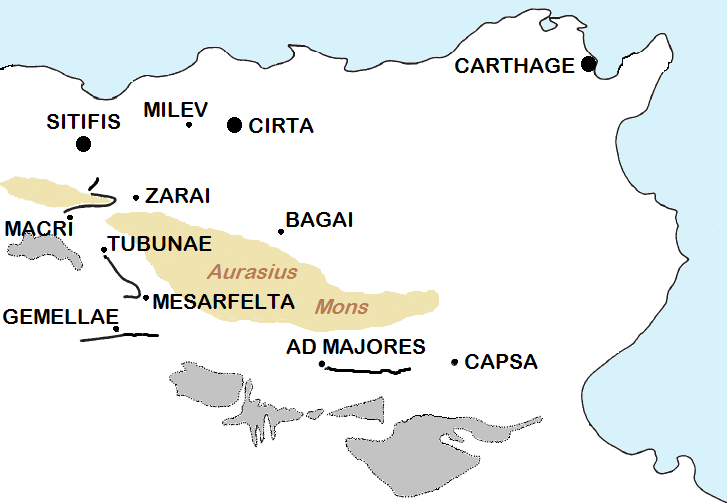
Cirta in Roman times was protected to the south and west by the Roman limes, the Fossatum Africae

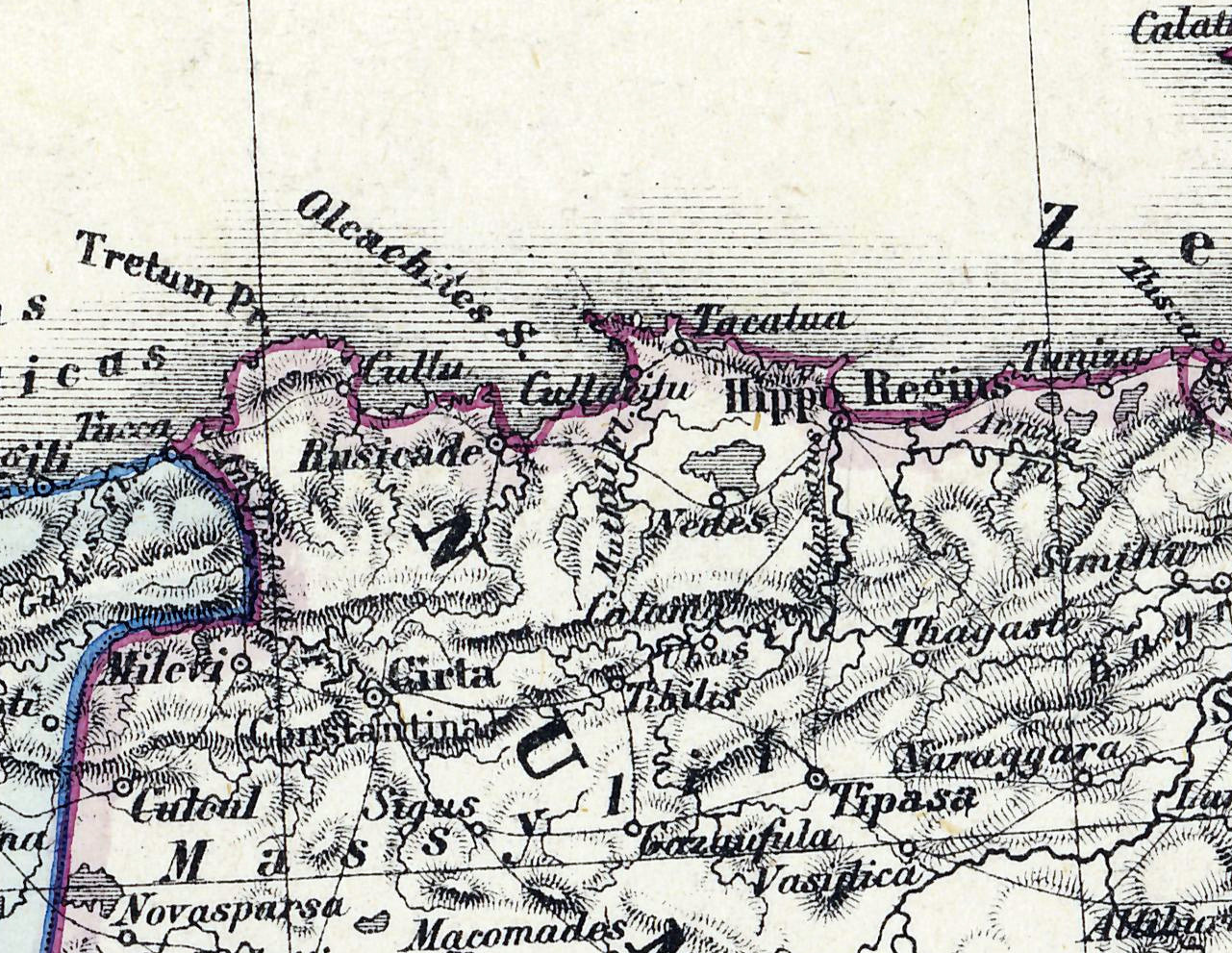
Cirta on the map of Roman Numidia

=== Numidian Kingdom ===
Cirta was the capital of the Berber kingdom of Numidia, an important political, economic, and military site west of the mercantile empire run by the Phoenician settlement of Carthage to its east.

During the second of Rome's wars against Carthage, the 203 BC Battle of Cirta was a decisive victory for Scipio Africanus. The kingdom remained an independent Roman ally following the destruction of Carthage in the Third Punic War, but Roman commercial influence and political involvement grew.

When King Micipsa died in 118 BC, a civil war broke out between the king's natural son Adherbal and his adoptive son Jugurtha. Adherbal appealed for Roman help and a senatorial commission brokered a seemingly successful division of the kingdom between the two heirs. Jugurtha followed this mediation, however, by besieging Cirta and killing both Adherbal and the Romans who defended him. Rome then prosecuted the Jugurthine War against his reunited Numidian state to assert their hegemony over the region and to secure the protection of its citizens abroad.

As Cirta rebuilt in the 1st century BC, its population was quite diverse: native Numidians alongside Carthaginian refugees and Greek, Roman, and Italian merchants, bankers, settlers, and army veterans. This expatriate community made it an important business hub of Rome's African holdings, even while it remained technically outside the lands of the Roman Republic.

=== Roman Empire ===
Cirta fell under direct Roman rule in 46 BC, following Julius Caesar's conquest of North Africa. P. Sittius Nucerinus was chosen by Caesar to romanize the locals. His men, the "Sittians" (Sittiani), were Campanian legionaries who controlled Cirta's lands on Rome's behalf.

Together with the colonies at Rusicade, Milevum, and Chullu, their Cirta formed an autonomous territory within "New Africa": the Confederatio Cirtense. Its magistrates and municipal assembly were those of the confederation. Cirta administered fortifications (castella) in the High Plains and at the north end of the colonies: Castellum Mastarense, Elephantum, Tidditanorum, Cletianis, Thibilis, Sigus, and others.

In 27 and 26 BC, the area's administration was restructured under Augustus, who split Cirta into communities (Latin: pagi) separating the Numidians from the Sittiani and other newly settled Romans.

With the expansion of the Roman limes, this colony at Cirta was at the center of the most Romanized area of Roman Africa. It was protected by the Fossatum Africae stretching from Sitifis and Icosium (present-day Algiers) to Capsa on the Gulf of Gabès. Robin Daniel estimates that by the end of the 2nd century, Cirta had nearly 50,000 inhabitants.

Cirta in 303 AD was the administrative capital of the newly created Numidia Cirtense, a small province -named from Cirta- made by emperor Diocletian in Roman Numidia in the last years of the third century. Numidia was divided in two: Numidia Cirtensis (or Cirtense), with capital at Cirta, and Numidia Militiana ("Military Numidia"), with capital at the legionary base of Lambaesis.

The newly created province was enlarged in 310 AD by the emperor Constantine.

Christianity arrived early on: while little remains of African Christianity before AD 200, records of Christians martyred at Cirta existed by the mid-3rd century. It became the chief town of an ecclesiastical district. Around 305, the First Council of Cirta was held to elect a new bishop, accidentally precipitating the Donatist movement. After the dissolution of its confederation of colonies in the 4th century, Cirta recovered its role as a capital when it headed the territory of Numidia Cirtensis created under Diocletian: however, after some decades, Emperor Constantine the Great reunited the two provinces created in 303 (Cirtensis & Militiana) in a single one, administered from Cirta, which was renamed Constantina (modern Constantine).

Indeed, the city was destroyed after a siege by Rufius Volusianus, the praefectus praetorio of the augustus Maxentius; Maxentius's forces defeated the imperial claimant Domitius Alexander in 310. Constantine the Great rebuilt under his own name after 312 and his own victory over Maxentius in the Battle of the Milvian Bridge. Constantine made Constantina the capital of all Roman Numidia. In 320 the bishop of Cirta was accused of having handed over (Latin: traditio) Christian texts to the authorities during the Diocletianic Persecution, which had begun in 303 in Cirta. The bishop Silvanus was a Donatist and was prosecuted in December 320 by Domitius Zenophilus, the consularis and proconsul of Africa; the records of the proceedings (commentarii) are preserved in the Latin: Gesta apud Zenophilum, lit. 'Deeds of Zenophilus', a text collected in the Optatan Appendix. A cave for the practice of Mithraism also existed in the 4th century.

In 412, Cirta was host to the Second Council of Cirta, overseen by St Augustine. According to Mommsen, Cirta was fully Latin-speaking and Christian by the time the Vandals arrived in AD 430.

Under the emperor Justinian I, the city walls were reinforced and the city was named capital of its region with a resident commander (dux). Cirta was part of the Byzantine Africa from 534 to 697.

=== Islamic conquest ===
During the Muslim conquest of the Maghreb, Constantine was unsuccessfully defended by the Berber queen Kahina. Although many Roman, Byzantine, and Vandal cities were destroyed during the expansion of the Caliphate, Constantine survived in reduced form with a small Christian community as late as the 10th century. The town's further development is detailed under the article Constantine.

== Bishops ==
The bishopric of Cirta was venerable and prominent in the African church. Several of its bishops are known:

- Paulus fl. 303–305 (Catholic)
- Siluanus 303–320
- Petilianus 354–422 (Donatist)
- Profutrus 391–397 (Catholic)
- Fortunatus 401–425 (Catholic), attendee of the council of 411
- Delphinus 411 (Catholic)
- Honoratus Antonius fl. 437 (Catholic)
- Victor 484 (Catholic)

Today the town of Constantine is again the seat of a diocese.

== See also ==
- Constantine, Algeria
- Mauretania Caesariensis
- Confederatio Cirtense
- Caesarea
- Auzia
- Rapidum
- Chullu
- Milevum
