= First Council of Cirta =

The First Council of Cirta was a synod of bishops called by Secundus of Tigisis, the primate of Numidia in AD 303 or 305. It took place in the city of Cirta.

The Council is known to history for the participation of several "traditores", bishops who had handed over scripture to the Roman authorities during the Diocletian Persecution, and the absolution that Secundus gave them.

The Council was also significant as Silvanus, a subdeacon, who had also been a traditor, was elected to the bishopric, amid much controversy; this act triggered the Donatist schism in Church History.

== See also ==
- Secundus of Tigisis
- Second Council of Cirta
