= Second Council of Cirta =

The Second Council of Cirta was a conference of Bishops, held in June 412, at Cirta in Roman North Africa, and was debated between the Catholics led by Augustine and the Donatists led by Silvanus of Numidia. It is notable as the origin of the Catholic dogma that "There is no salvation outside the Catholic Church".

== History ==
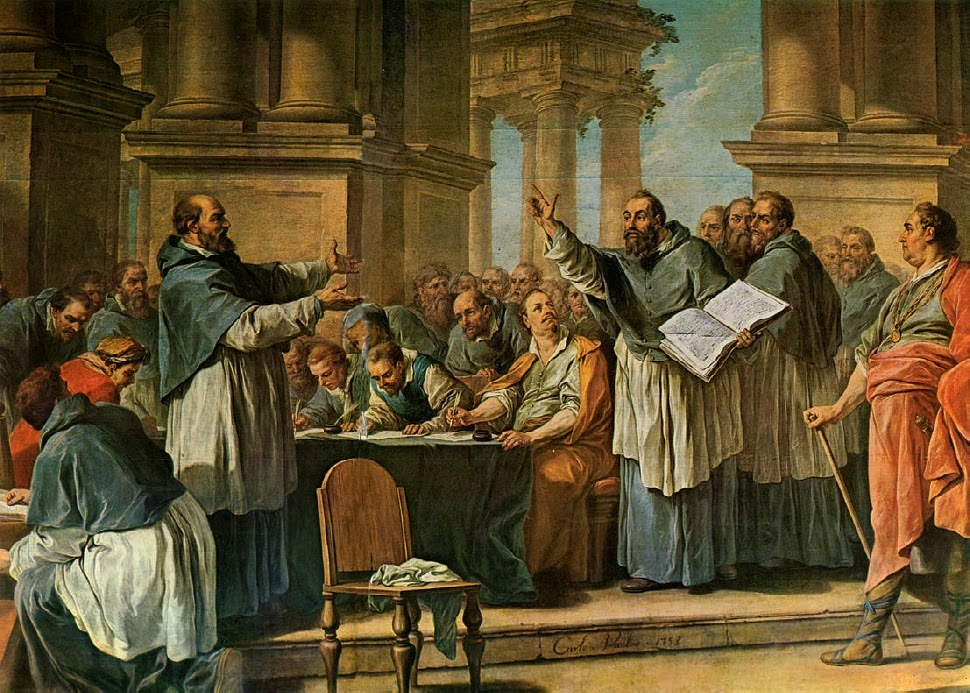
Augustine arguing with Donatists.

The conference was chaired by Augustine, but was called by Donatists in response to the dissatisfaction the Donatist bishops held at the Council of Carthage the year before and by Catholics to refute the Donatists. Mostly what we know of the Council comes from the writings of Augustine.

Most significantly Augustine said,

“He who is separated from the body of the Catholic Church, however laudable his conduct may seem, will never enjoy eternal life, and the anger of God remains on him by reason of the crime of which he is guilty in living separated from Christ because he was separated from the Catholic Church.”

The Donatist position, by contrast, was that "the true church was only composed of those who were repentant." The repetition of baptism was "pollution of the souls", and baptism was only valid based on the character of the baptizer.

== See also ==
- First Council of Cirta
