= Oasis =

Fertile area in a desert environment

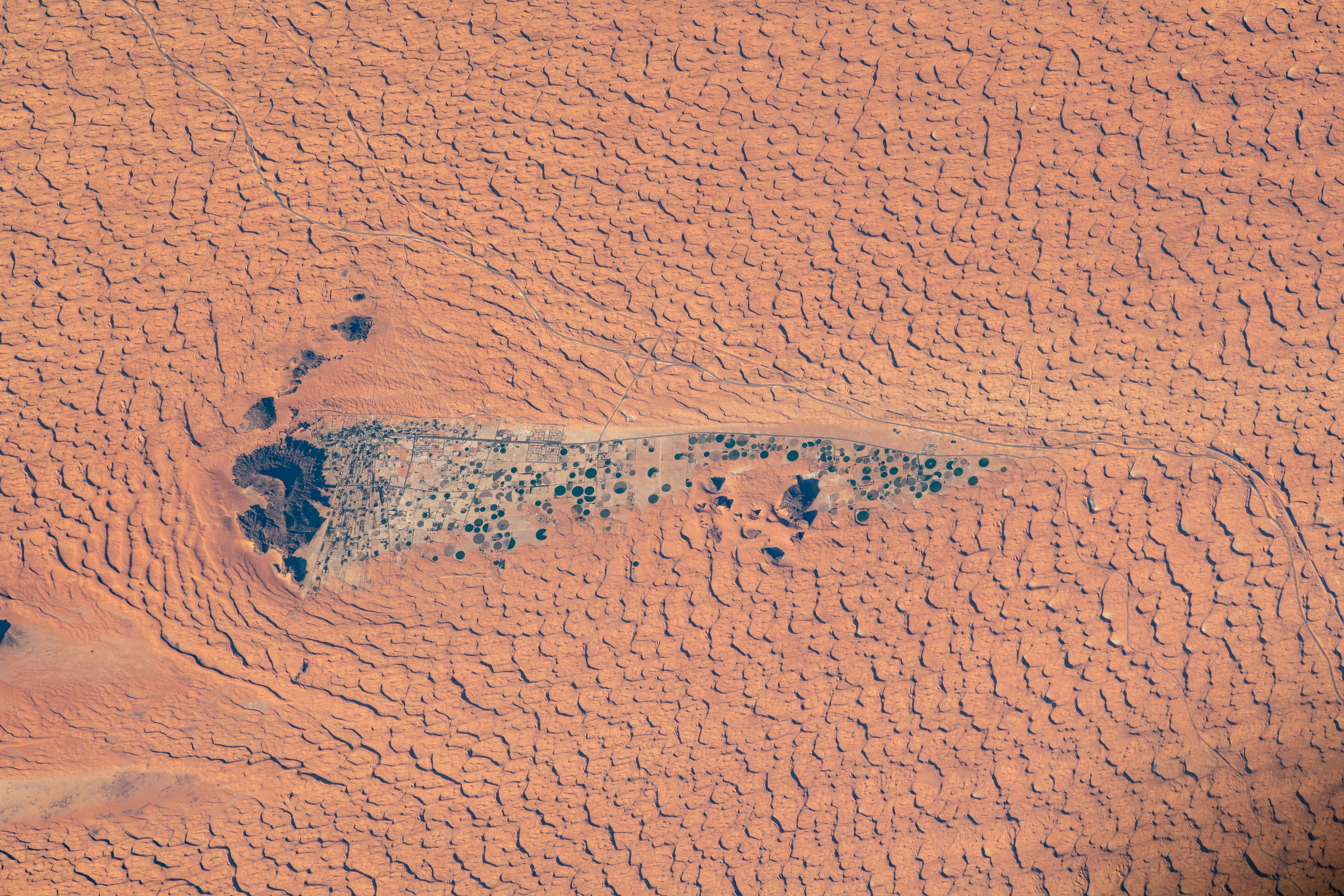
The desert oasis city of Jubbah in Saudi Arabia as photographed from space.

An oasis (/oʊˈeɪsɪs/; pl.: oases /oʊˈeɪsiːz/) is a fertile area of a desert or semi-desert environment that sustains plant life and provides habitat for animals. Surface water may be present, or water may only be accessible from wells or underground channels created by humans. In geography, an oasis may be a current or past rest stop on a transportation route, or less-than-verdant location that nonetheless provides access to underground water through deep wells created and maintained by humans. Although they depend on a natural condition, such as the presence of water that may be stored in reservoirs and used for irrigation, most oases, as we know them, are artificial.

The word oasis came into English from Latin: oasis, from Greek: ὄασις, óasis, which in turn is a direct borrowing from Demotic Egyptian. The word for oasis in the latter-attested Coptic language (the descendant of Demotic Egyptian) is wahe or ouahe which means a "dwelling place". Oasis in Arabic is wāḥa (Arabic: واحة).

== Description ==
Oases develop in "hydrologically favored" locations that have attributes such as a high water table, seasonal lakes, or blockaded wadis. Oases are made when sources of freshwater, such as springs, underground rivers, or aquifers irrigate the surface naturally or via man-made wells. The presence of water on the surface or underground is necessary and the local or regional management of this essential resource is strategic, but not sufficient to create such areas: continuous human work and know-how (a technical and social culture) are essential to maintain such ecosystems. Some of the possible human contributions to maintaining an oasis include digging and maintaining wells, digging and maintaining canals, and continuously removing opportunistic plants that threaten to gorge themselves on water and fertility needed to maintain human and animal food supplies. Stereotypically, an oasis has a "central pool of open water surrounded by a ring of water-dependent shrubs and trees…which are in turn encircled by an outlying transition zone to desert plants".

Rain showers provide subterranean water to sustain natural oases, such as the Tuat. Substrata of impermeable rock and stone can trap water and retain it in pockets, or on long faulting subsurface ridges or volcanic dikes water can collect and percolate to the surface. Any incidence of water is then used by migrating birds, which also pass seeds with their droppings which will grow at the water's edge forming an oasis. It can also be used to plant crops.

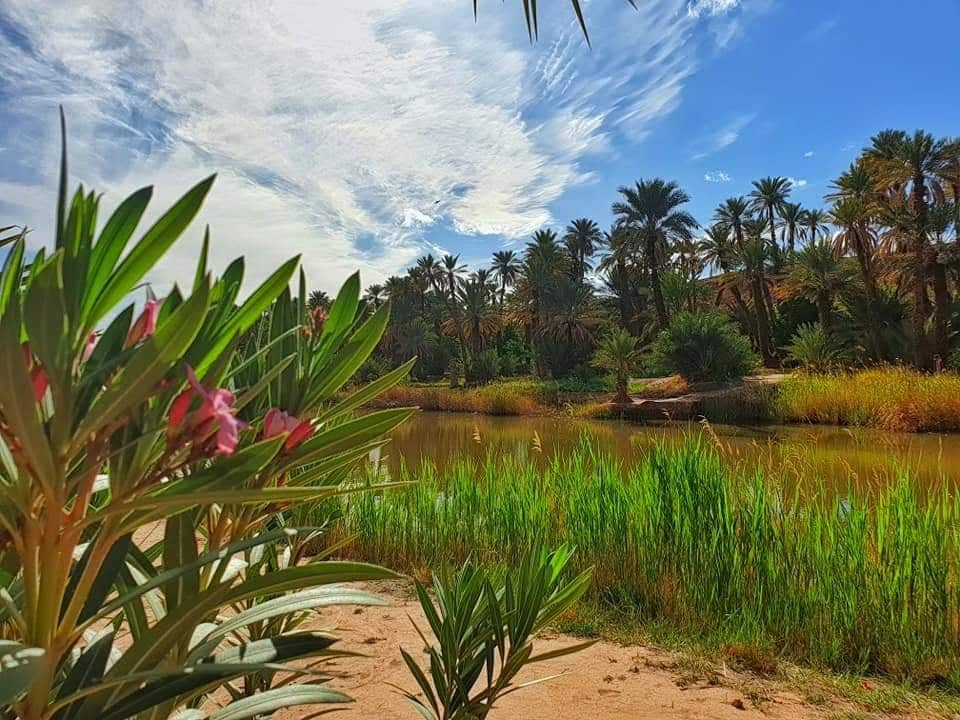
An Oasis in Taghit, Algeria

=== Geography ===
Oases in West Asia and North Africa cover about 1,000,000 hectares (2,500,000 acres; 10,000 km^{2}), however, they support the livelihood of about 10 million inhabitants. The stark ratio of oasis to desert land in the world means that the oasis ecosystem is "relatively minute, rare and precious".

There are 90 "major oases" within the Sahara Desert. Some of their fertility may derive from irrigation systems called foggaras, khettaras, lkhttarts, or a variety of other regional names.

In some oases systems, there is "a geometrical system of raised channels that release controlled amounts of the water into individual plots, soaking the soil".

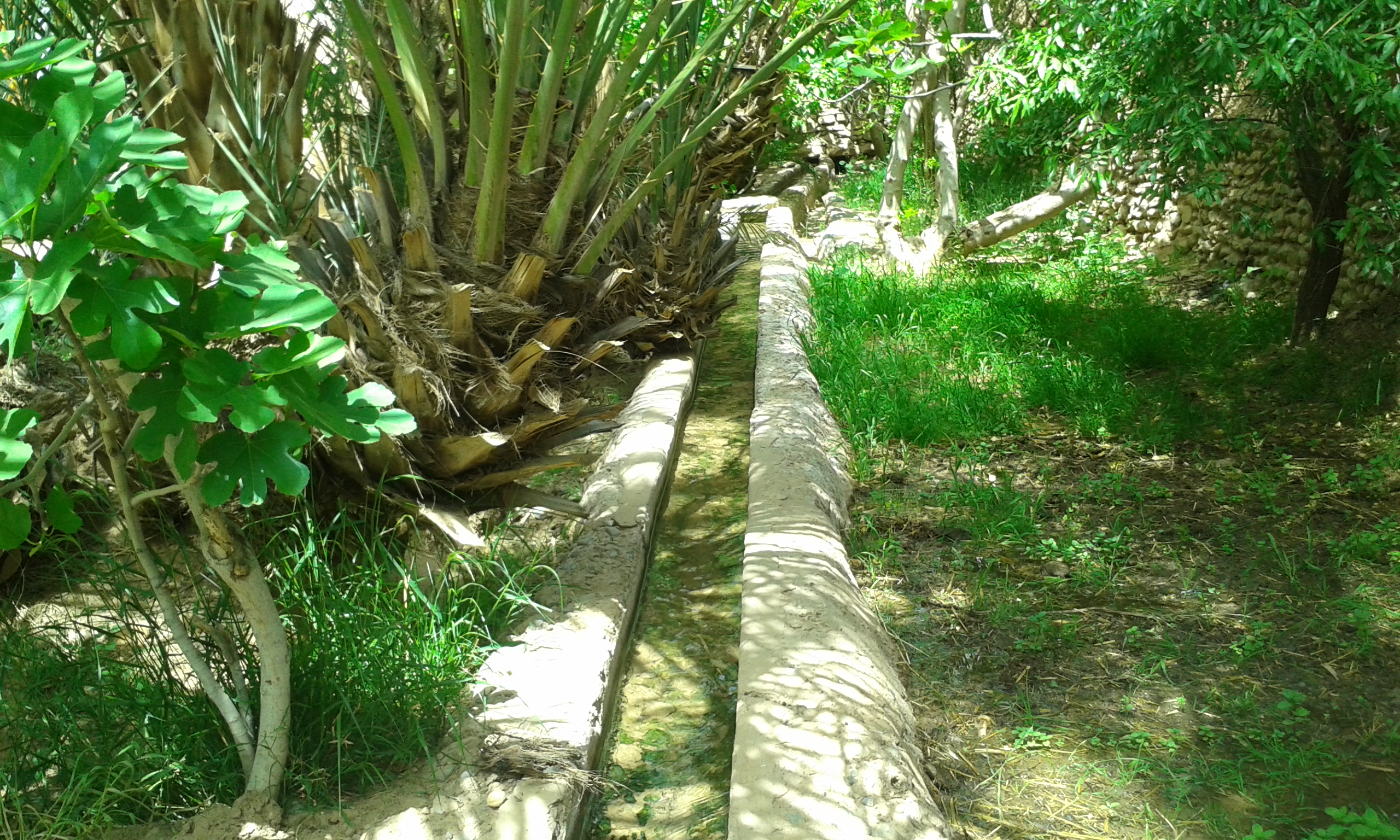
Irrigation canal within the Figuig Oasis in eastern Morocco

=== History ===
Oases often have human histories that are measured in millennia. Archaeological digs at Ein Gedi in the Dead Sea Valley have found evidence of settlement dating to 6,000 BC. Al-Ahsa on the Arabian Peninsula shows evidence of human residence dating to the Neolithic.

Anthropologically, the oasis is "an area of sedentary life, which associates the city [medina] or village [ksar] with its surrounding feeding source, the palm grove, within a relational and circulatory nomadic system".

The location of oases has been of critical importance for trade and transportation routes in desert areas; caravans must travel via oases so that supplies of water and food can be replenished. Thus, political or military control of an oasis has in many cases meant control of trade on a particular route. For example, the oases of Awjila, Ghadames and Kufra, situated in modern-day Libya, have at various times been vital to both north–south and east–west trade in the Sahara Desert. The location of oases also informed the Darb El Arba'īn trade route from Sudan to Egypt, as well as the caravan route from the Niger River to Tangier, Morocco. The Silk Road "traced its course from water hole to water hole, relying on oasis communities such as Turpan in China and Samarkand in Uzbekistan".

According to the United Nations, "Oases are at the very heart of the overall development of peri-Saharan countries due to their geographical location and the fact they are preferred migration routes in times of famine or insecurity in the region."

Oases in Oman, on the Arabian Peninsula near the Persian Gulf, vary somewhat from the Saharan form. While still located in an arid or semi-arid zone with a date palm overstory, these oases are usually located below plateaus and "watered either by springs or by aflaj, tunnel systems dug into the ground or carved into the rock to tap underground aquifers". This rainwater harvesting system "never developed a serious salinity problem".

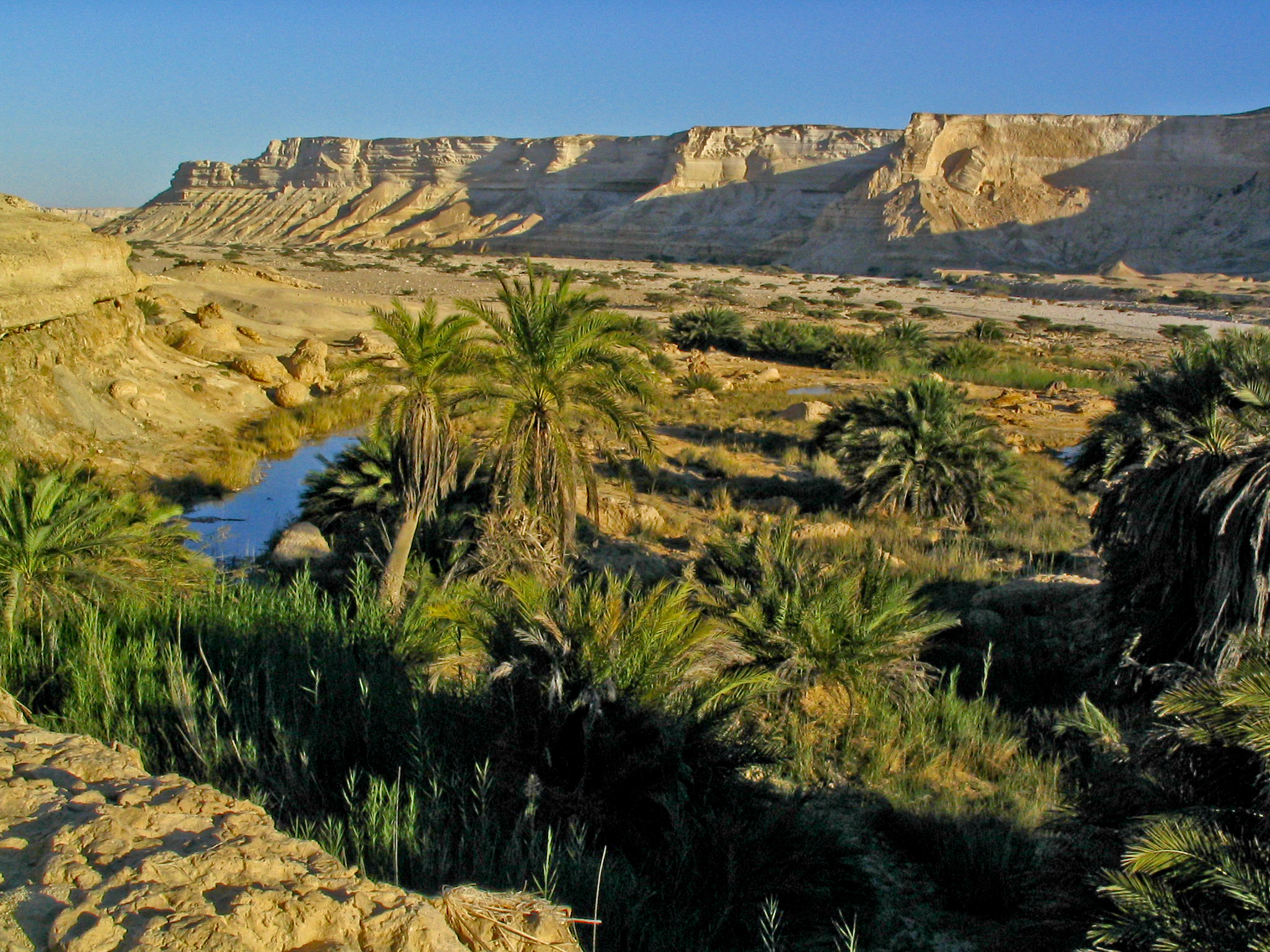
Oasis in Oman

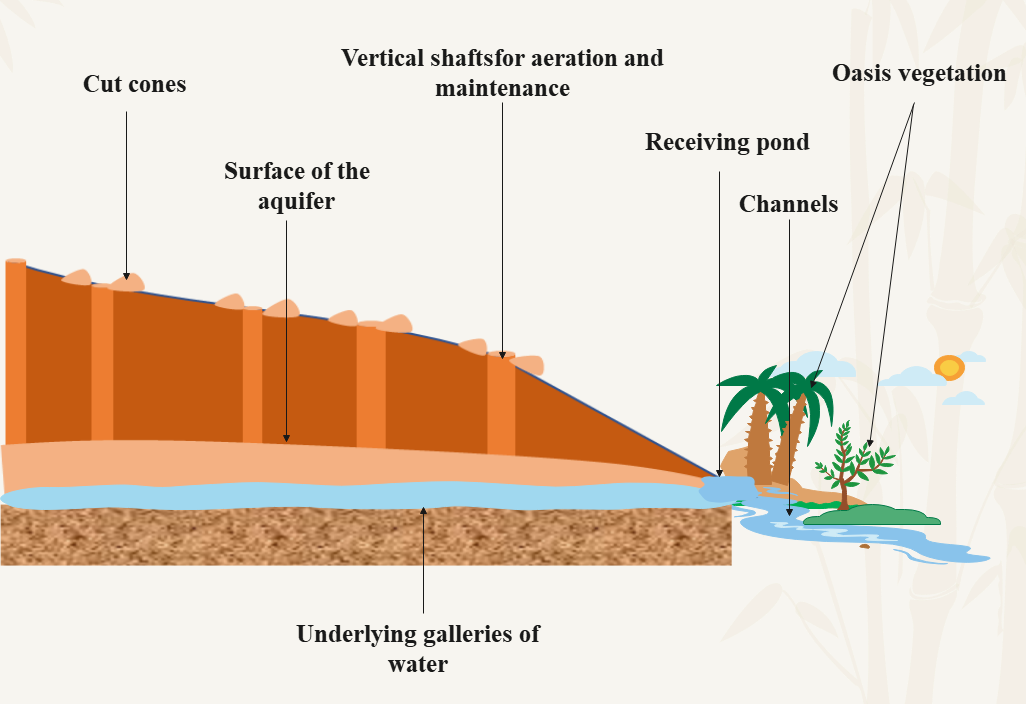
Diagram of khattara system

=== Palm Oasis ===
In the drylands of southwestern North America, there is a habitat form called Palm Oasis (alternately Palm Series or Oasis Scrub Woodland) that has the native California fan palm as the overstory species. These Palm Oases can be found in California, Arizona, Baja California, and Sonora.

== Agroforestry ==
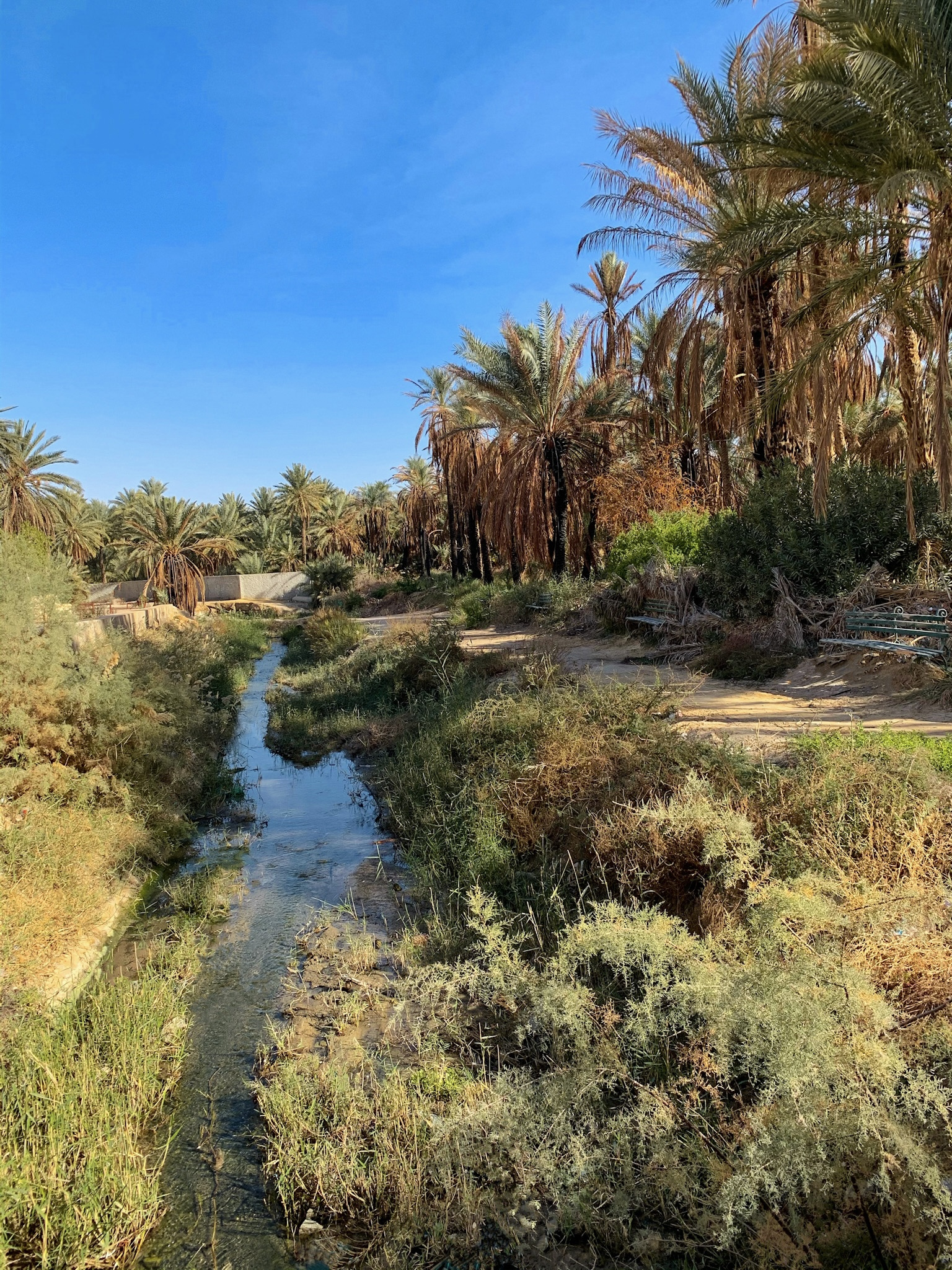
Djerid Oasis, Tunisia

People who live in an oasis must manage land and water use carefully. The most important plant in an oasis is the date palm (Phoenix dactylifera L.), which forms the upper layer. These palm trees provide shade for smaller understory trees like apricots, figs, olives, and peach trees, which form the middle layer. Market-garden vegetables, some cereals (such as sorghum, barley, millet, and wheat), and/or mixed animal fodder, are grown in the bottom layer where there is more moisture. The oasis is integrated into its desert environment through an often close association with nomadic transhumant livestock farming (very often pastoral and sedentary populations are clearly distinguished). The fertility of the oasis soil is restored by "cyclic organic inputs of animal origin". In summary, an oasis palm grove is a highly anthropized and irrigated area that supports a traditionally intensive and polyculture-based agriculture.

Responding to environmental constraints, the three strata create what is called the "oasis effect". The three layers and all their interaction points create a variety of combinations of "horizontal wind speed, relative air temperature and relative air humidity". The plantings—through a virtuous cycle of wind reduction, increased shade and evapotranspiration—create a microclimate favorable to crops; "measurements taken in different oases have showed that the potential evapotranspiration of the areas was reduced by 30 to 50 percent within the oasis."

The keystone date palm trees are "a main income source and staple food for local populations in many countries in which they are cultivated, and have played significant roles in the economy, society, and environment of those countries". Challenges for date palm oasis polycultures include "low rainfall, high temperatures, water resources often high in salt content, and high incidence of pests".

The oases consist of almost unbroken forests of date palms, divided up into many gardens that are separated by mud walls and intersected by innumerable irrigation and drainage ditches… In the shade of the palms are grown many other kinds of fruit trees—oranges, olives, figs, apricots, peaches, pomegranates, and jujubes—interlaced with large grape vines that often hang in festoons from the palm trunks. Beneath the trees are small plots of garden vegetables, barley, and alfalfa. Neither date palms nor other trees are planted with any regularity, and the growth is often so dense that the garden resembles a tropical jungle. Very beautiful are these gardens in the spring, when the apricot and peach trees are in blossom here and there among the palms and the figs and vines are putting forth their leaves. In autumn, when the dates are ripening, the color effects, especially when the tops of the palms are lit up by the last rays of the setting sun, are something that once seen can never be forgotten. The great clusters of fruit, displaying every tint from bright yellow, through orange, vermilion, and maroon, to plum purple and chestnut brown, with their brilliant yellow or rich orange ivory-like stalks, contrast superbly with the dull bluish or gray green of the feathery crowns of foliage. It is small wonder that a whole folklore of poetic legends and proverbs has grown up around the date palm in the regions where it flourishes.

— Kearney, Thomas H. (1906-09-06). Bulletin: Date Varieties and Date Culture in Tunis.

== Distressed systems ==
Many historic oases have struggled with drought and inadequate maintenance.

According to a United Nations report on the future of oases in the Sahara and Sahel, "Increasingly ... oases are subject to various pressures, heavily influenced by the effects of climate change, decreasing groundwater levels and a gradual loss of cultural heritage due to a fading historical memory concerning traditional water management techniques. These natural pressures are compounded by demographic pressures and the introduction of modern water pumping techniques that can disrupt traditional resource management schemes, particularly in the North Saharan oases."

For example, five historic oases in the Western Desert of Egypt (Kharga, Dakhla, Farafra, Baharyia, and Siwa) once had "flowing spring and wells" but due to the decline of groundwater heads because of overuse for land reclamation projects those water sources are no more and the oases suffer as a result.

Morocco has lost two-thirds of its oasis habitat over the last 100 years due to heat, drought, and water scarcity. The Ferkla Oases in Morocco once drew on water from the Ferkla, Sat and Tangarfa Rivers but they are now dry but for a few days a year.

== List of places called oasis ==
Old World Oases
Country	Administrative Division	Name	Elevation	Typology	Part of	Ref.
Algeria	Tébessa	Ferkane Oasis	272	Wadi	Wadi Mantana	
Algeria	Tébessa	Negrine Oasis	355	Wadi	Wadi Mantana	
Algeria	Batna	Ghassira Oasis	759	Wadi	Wadi Abiod	
Algeria	Batna	Ghoufi Oasis	663	Wadi	Wadi Abiod	
Algeria	Batna	M'doukel Oasis	405	Wadi	Wadi Al Naemia	
Algeria	Batna	Taghit Tkoutt Oasis	851	Wadi	Wadi Abiod	
Algeria	Batna	Tifelfal Oasis	778	Wadi	Wadi Abiod	
Algeria	Batna	Tigherghar Oasis	705	Wadi	Wadi Ouled Abdi	
Algeria	Djelfa	Amourah Oasis	1017	Wadi	Wadi Bu Kahil	
Algeria	Djelfa	Messaad Oasis	782	Wadi	Wadi Messaad	
Algeria	Khenchela	Chebla Oasis	503	Wadi	Wadi Zeribet	
Algeria	Khenchela	El Ouldja Oasis	306	Wadi	Wadi Zeribet	
Algeria	Khenchela	Khirane Oasis	569	Wadi	Wadi Zeribet	
Algeria	Biskra	Baniane Oasis	480	Wadi	Wadi Aghzar Amlal	
Algeria	Biskra	Biskra Oasis	95	Wadi	Wadi Sidi Zerzour	
Algeria	Biskra	Branis Oasis	287	Wadi	Wadi Sidi Zerzour	
Algeria	Biskra	Djemorah Oasis	522	Wadi	Wadi Ouled Abdi	
Algeria	Biskra	Doucen Oasis	177	Wadi	Wadi Jadi	
Algeria	Biskra	El Haouch Oasis	-8	Depression		
Algeria	Biskra	El Kantara Oasis	503	Wadi	Wadi El Kantara	
Algeria	Biskra	Khenguet Sidi Nadji Oasis	160	Wadi	Wadi Zeribet	
Algeria	Biskra	Lioua Oasis	105	Wadi	Wadi Djedi	
Algeria	Biskra	M'Chouneche Oasis	301	Wadi	Wadi Abiod	
Algeria	Biskra	Mekhadma Oasis	93	Wadi	Wadi Djedi	
Algeria	Biskra	M'lili Oasis	62	Wadi	Wadi Djedi	
Algeria	Biskra	Ouled Djelal Oasis	189	Wadi	Wadi Djedi	
Algeria	Biskra	Oumache Oasis	50	Wadi	Wadi Djedi	
Algeria	Biskra	Sidi Khaled Oasis	209	Wadi	Wadi Djedi	
Algeria	Biskra	Sidi Masmoudi Oasis	204	Wadi	Wadi Ahmar Khadu	
Algeria	Biskra	Sidi Okba Oasis	50	Wadi	Wadi El Biraz	
Algeria	Biskra	Tolga Oasis	156	Wadi	Wadi Jadi	
Algeria	El Oued	Ain Cheik Oasis	0	Depression		
Algeria	El Oued	Debila Oasis	56	Erg		
Algeria	El Oued	Djamaa Oasis	34	Wadi	Wadi Righ	
Algeria	El Oued	El Meghaier Oasis	-11	Depression		
Algeria	El Oued	El Oued Oasis	79	Erg		
Algeria	El Oued	Guemar Oasis	64	Erg		
Algeria	El Oued	Hassani Abdelkrim Oasis	58	Erg		
Algeria	El Oued	Hassi Khalifa Oasis	48	Erg		
Algeria	El Oued	Lizerg Oasis	71	Erg		
Algeria	El Oued	Magrane Oasis	52	Erg		
Algeria	El Oued	Mih Ouansa Oasis	101	Erg		
Algeria	El Oued	Oued El Alenda Oasis	90	Erg		
Algeria	El Oued	Oum Toyour Oasis	6	Depression		
Algeria	El Oued	Reguiba Oasis	54	Erg		
Algeria	El Oued	Sidi Amrane Oasis	44	Wadi	Wadi Righ	
Algeria	El Oued	Sidi Khelil Oasis	21	Depression		
Algeria	El Oued	Still Oasis	7	Depression		
Algeria	El Oued	Temerna Djedida Oasis	66	Wadi	Wadi Righ	
Algeria	El Oued	Tendla Oasis	14	Wadi	Wadi Righ	
Algeria	El Bayadh	Arbaouat Oasis	1022	Wadi	Wadi	
Algeria	El Bayadh	Boussemghoun Oasis	983	Wadi	Wadi Boussemghoun	
Algeria	El Bayadh	Brezina Oasis	851	Wadi	Wadi Seggeur	
Algeria	El Bayadh	Sidi El Hadj Eddine Oasis	753	Erg		
Algeria	Naâma	Moghrar Oasis	936	Wadi	Wadi Moghrar	
Algeria	Naâma	Moghtar Tahtani Oasis	868	Wadi	Wadi Moghrar	
Algeria	Naâma	Tiout Naâma Oasis	1022	Wadi	Wadi Namous	
Algeria	Ouargla	Al Alia Oasis	106	Erg		
Algeria	Ouargla	Benaceur Oasis	104	Erg		
Algeria	Ouargla	Blidet Amor Oasis	91	Wadi	Wadi Righ	
Algeria	Ouargla	Daglet Lagrouba Oasis	107	Erg		
Algeria	Ouargla	El Bour Oasis	127	Depression		
Algeria	Ouargla	El Hadjira Oasis	110	Erg		
Algeria	Ouargla	M'Naguer Oasis	99	Erg		
Algeria	Ouargla	Meggarine Oasis	69	Wadi	Wadi Righ	
Algeria	Ouargla	N'Goussa Oasis	126	Depression		
Algeria	Ouargla	Ouargla Oasis	135	Depression		
Algeria	Ouargla	Sidi Slimane Oasis	53	Wadi	Wadi Righ	
Algeria	Ouargla	Taibet Oasis	99	Erg		
Algeria	Ouargla	Taibine Oasis	114	Erg		
Algeria	Ouargla	Temacine Oasis	81	Wadi	Wadi Righ	
Algeria	Ouargla	Touggourt Oasis	72	Wadi	Wadi Righ	
Algeria	Ghardaïa	Beni Isguen Oasis	497	Wadi	Wadi M'Zab	
Algeria	Ghardaïa	Berriane Oasis	533	Wadi	Wadi Baloh	
Algeria	Ghardaïa	Bounoura Oasis	494	Wadi	Wadi M'Zab	
Algeria	Ghardaïa	Dhayet Bendhahoua Oasis	532	Wadi	Wadi M'Zab	
Algeria	Ghardaïa	El Atteuf Oasis	465	Wadi	Wadi M'Zab	
Algeria	Ghardaïa	El Guerrara Oasis	303	Wadi	Wadi Zegrir	
Algeria	Ghardaïa	Ghardaia Oasis	514	Wadi	Wadi M'Zab	
Algeria	Ghardaïa	Hassi Gara Oasis	399	Depression		
Algeria	Ghardaïa	Metlili Oasis	511	Wadi	Wadi Metlili	
Algeria	Ghardaïa	Zelfana Oasis	354	Wadi	Wadi Metlili	
Algeria	Béchar	Aguedal Oasis	420	Wadi	Wadi Saoura	
Algeria	Béchar	Beni Abbes Oasis	459	Wadi	Wadi Saoura	
Algeria	Béchar	Beni Ikhlef Oasis	399	Wadi	Wadi Saoura	
Algeria	Béchar	Boukais Oasis	847	Wadi	Wadi Al Hasra	
Algeria	Béchar	Igli Oasis	508	Wadi	Wadi Saoura	
Algeria	Béchar	Kerzaz Oasis	379	Wadi	Wadi Saoura	
Algeria	Béchar	Ksabi Oasis	331	Wadi	Wadi Saoura	
Algeria	Béchar	Mazzer Oasis	506	Wadi	Wadi Saoura	
Algeria	Béchar	Oulad Raffa Oasis	350	Wadi	Wadi Saoura	
Algeria	Béchar	Ouled Khoudir Oasis	347	Wadi	Wadi Saoura	
Algeria	Béchar	Tabelbala Oasis	521	Mountain		
Algeria	Béchar	Taghit Oasis	602	Wadi	Wadi Zouzfana	
Algeria	Béchar	Timoudi Oasis	356	Wadi	Wadi Saoura	
Algeria	Adrar	Adjir Oasis	360	Erg		
Algeria	Adrar	Admer Zaouiet Oasis	210	Depression		
Algeria	Adrar	Adrar Oasis	244	Depression		
Algeria	Adrar	Ain Hammou Oasis	367	Erg		
Algeria	Adrar	Akabli Oasis	221	Erg		
Algeria	Adrar	Anzeglouf Oasis	185	Erg		
Algeria	Adrar	Aougrout Oasis	294	Depression		
Algeria	Adrar	Aoulef Oasis	276	Erg		
Algeria	Adrar	Arhlad Oasis	275	Erg		
Algeria	Adrar	Azekkour Oasis	252	Erg		
Algeria	Adrar	Azoua Oasis	198	Depression		
Algeria	Adrar	Badriane Oasis	267	Erg		
Algeria	Adrar	Ben Henni Oasis	230	Erg		
Algeria	Adrar	Beni Aissi Oasis	351	Erg		
Algeria	Adrar	Bou Ali Oasis	224	Depression		
Algeria	Adrar	Bouda Oasis	234	Depression		
Algeria	Adrar	Bouffaddi Oasis	240	Erg		
Algeria	Adrar	Bour Sidi Youssef Oasis	244	Erg		
Algeria	Adrar	Charouine Oasis	287	Depression		
Algeria	Adrar	El Djedid Oasis	233	Erg		
Algeria	Adrar	El Hadj Guelmane Oasis	243	Erg		
Algeria	Adrar	El Ksabi Oasis	256	Depression		
Algeria	Adrar	El Mansour Oasis	233	Depression		
Algeria	Adrar	Enefis Oasis	204	Depression		
Algeria	Adrar	Fatis Oasis	359	Erg		
Algeria	Adrar	Fenoughil Oasis	225	Erg		
Algeria	Adrar	Guentour Oasis	307	Erg		
Algeria	Adrar	Haha Oasis	373	Erg		
Algeria	Adrar	Hammad Oasis	247	Depression		
Algeria	Adrar	Hassi Nba Oasis	342	Erg		
Algeria	Adrar	Ihrzer Oasis	236	Erg		
Algeria	Adrar	Ksar Temassekht Oasis	259	Erg		
Algeria	Adrar	Lahmer Oasis	316	Erg		
Algeria	Adrar	Mahidia Oasis	234	Depression		
Algeria	Adrar	Metarfa Oasis	252	Erg		
Algeria	Adrar	Noun En Nass Oasis	259	Erg		
Algeria	Adrar	Ouadjda Oasis	264	Erg		
Algeria	Adrar	Oufrane Oasis	288	Erg		
Algeria	Adrar	Oulad Aiach Oasis	358	Erg		
Algeria	Adrar	Oulad Antar Oasis	226	Erg		
Algeria	Adrar	Oulad Bou Yahia Oasis	233	Erg		
Algeria	Adrar	Oulad Meriem Oasis	171	Erg		
Algeria	Adrar	Ouled Abbou Oasis	255	Depression		
Algeria	Adrar	Ouled Aissa Oasis	361	Erg		
Algeria	Adrar	Ouled Mahmoud Oasis	268	Depression		
Algeria	Adrar	Ouled Rached Oasis	254	Erg		
Algeria	Adrar	Ouled Said Oasis	268	Erg		
Algeria	Adrar	Reggane Oasis	203	Depression		
Algeria	Adrar	Rhamianou Oasis	249	Erg		
Algeria	Adrar	Sali Oasis	160	Depression		
Algeria	Adrar	Sebaa Oasis	262	Depression		
Algeria	Adrar	Semdjane Oasis	327	Erg		
Algeria	Adrar	Semouta Oasis	272	Erg		
Algeria	Adrar	Tabelkoza Oasis	377	Erg		
Algeria	Adrar	Tabou Oasis	312	Erg		
Algeria	Adrar	Taghouzi Oasis	373	Erg		
Algeria	Adrar	Tamadanine Oasis	163	Depression		
Algeria	Adrar	Tamentit Oasis	244	Depression		
Algeria	Adrar	Tamest Oasis	226	Erg		
Algeria	Adrar	Taouennza Oasis	376	Erg		
Algeria	Adrar	Tasfaout Oasis	216	Erg		
Algeria	Adrar	Tawrirt Oasis	220	Depression		
Algeria	Adrar	Tegant Oasis	360	Erg		
Algeria	Adrar	Thala Oasis	246	Erg		
Algeria	Adrar	Timimoun Oasis	225	Depression		
Algeria	Adrar	Timleha Oasis	243	Depression		
Algeria	Adrar	Timmassekh Oasis	224	Depression		
Algeria	Adrar	Tindjellet Oasis	249	Erg		
Algeria	Adrar	Tiouliline Oasis	196	Depression		
Algeria	Adrar	Tiourinine Oasis	223	Erg		
Algeria	Adrar	Titaf Oasis	251	Erg		
Algeria	Adrar	Tlalet Oasis	248	Erg		
Algeria	Adrar	Tsabit Oasis	252	Depression		
Algeria	Adrar	Zaglou Oasis	232	Depression		
Algeria	Adrar	Zaouia Sidi Abd El Kader Oasis	222	Erg		
Algeria	Adrar	Zaouia Sidi Bekri Oasis	241	Depression		
Algeria	Adrar	Zaouiet Debagh Oasis	354	Erg		
Algeria	Adrar	Zaouiet Kounta Oasis	195	Depression		
Algeria	Adrar	Zaouiet Sidi Mansour Oasis	376	Erg		
Algeria	Illizi	Illizi Oasis	558	Wadi	Wadi Takhamalt	
Algeria	Illizi	Djanet Oasis	1032	Wadi	Wadi Idjeriou	
Algeria	Illizi	Iherir Oasis	1118	Wadi	Wadi Iherir	
Algeria	Tamanghasset	Foggaret Ezzaouia Oasis	300	Erg		
Algeria	Tamanghasset	Igostene Oasis	274	Depression		
Algeria	Tamanghasset	In Ghar Oasis	256	Erg		
China	Gansu	Crescent Lake	?	?		
Egypt	Matruh	Qara Oasis	-41	Depression		
Egypt	Matruh	Siwa Oasis	-11	Depression		
Egypt	Jizah	Bahariya Oasis	118	Depression		
Egypt	Jizah	El Heiz Oasis	123	Depression		
Egypt	Fayyum	Fayyum Oasis	32	Depression		
Egypt	Al Wadi al Jadid	Abu Minqar Oasis	117	Depression		
Egypt	Al Wadi al Jadid	Al Kharga Oasis	66	Depression		
Egypt	Al Wadi al Jadid	Baris Oasis	54	Depression		
Egypt	Al Wadi al Jadid	Dahla Oasis	111	Depression		
Egypt	Al Wadi al Jadid	Farafra Oasis	85	Depression		
Egypt	Aswan	Kurkur Oasis	316	Depression		
Israel	Judea and Samaria Area	Ein Gedi Oasis	?	?		
Libya	Butnan	Al Jaghbub Oasis	-2	Depression		
Libya	Nalut	Derj Oasis	421	Wadi	Wadi Tanarut	
Libya	Nalut	Ghadames Oasis	338	Depression		
Libya	Jabal al Gharbi	Shakshuk Oasis	213	Mountain		
Libya	Al Wahat	Awjillah Oasis	35	Depression		
Libya	Al Wahat	Jakharrad Oasis	31	Depression		
Libya	Al Wahat	Jalu Oasis	39	Depression		
Libya	Al Wahat	Maradah Oasis	47	Depression		
Libya	Al Jufrah	Al Fuqaha Oasis	539	Wadi	Wadi Jabal Al Huruj	
Libya	Al Jufrah	Sokna Oasis	270	Depression		
Libya	Al Jufrah	Waddan Oasis	247	Depression		
Libya	Al Jufrah	Zillah Oasis	216	Depression		
Libya	Wadi al Shatii	Adiri Oasis	366	Erg		
Libya	Wadi al Shatii	Brak Oasis	350	Wadi	Wadi ash Shati	
Libya	Wadi al Shatii	Wanzarik Oasis	380	Erg		
Libya	Sabha	Sabha Oasis	419	Erg		
Libya	Sabha	Tamanhint Oasis	413	Erg		
Libya	Ghat	Al Awaynat Oasis	656	Wadi	Wadi Al Kawakib	
Libya	Ghat	Ghat Oasis	675	Erg		
Libya	Wadi al Hayat	Awbari Oasis	466	Erg		
Libya	Wadi al Hayat	Gaberoun Oasis	451	Erg		
Libya	Wadi al Hayat	Germa Oasis	465	Erg		
Libya	Wadi al Hayat	Qasr Larocu Oasis	466	Erg		
Libya	Al Kufrah	Al Kufra Oasis	382	Depression		
Libya	Al Kufrah	Buzaymah Oasis	292	Depression		
Libya	Al Kufrah	Rabyanah Oasis	381	Erg		
Libya	Al Kufrah	Tazirbu Oasis	255	Depression		
Libya	Murzuq	Dujal Oasis	472	Erg		
Libya	Murzuq	Qatrun Oasis	474	Erg		
Libya	Murzuq	Murzuq Oasis	453	Erg		
Libya	Murzuq	Tajarhi Oasis	494	Erg		
Mauritania	Adrar	Ain Ehel Taya Oasis	152	Wadi	Wadi Atar	
Mauritania	Adrar	Amder Oasis	248	Wadi	Wadi Atar	
Mauritania	Adrar	Aoujeft Oasis	252	Wadi	Wadi Tidjikja	
Mauritania	Adrar	Atar Oasis	223	Wadi	Wadi Atar	
Mauritania	Adrar	Azougui Oasis	250	Wadi	Wadi Atar	
Mauritania	Adrar	Chinguetti Oasis	494	Wadi	Wadi Chinguetti	
Mauritania	Adrar	El Meddah Oasis	139	Erg		
Mauritania	Adrar	El Oudei Oasis	229	Wadi	Wadi Al Abiad	
Mauritania	Adrar	Entkemkemt Oasis	478	Wadi	Wadi Chinguetti	
Mauritania	Adrar	Faraoun Oasis	162	Wadi	Wadi Ejwali	
Mauritania	Adrar	Ksar Torchane Oasis	263	Wadi	Wadi Atar	
Mauritania	Adrar	Maaden Oasis	166	Depression		
Mauritania	Adrar	Medina Rahme Oasis	358	Mountain		
Mauritania	Adrar	Mhaireth Oasis	354	Wadi	Wadi Al Abiad	
Mauritania	Adrar	Ouadane Oasis	446	Wadi	Wadi Ifenouar	
Mauritania	Adrar	Dakhlet el Ghzâl Oasis	149	Erg		
Mauritania	Adrar	Salah Eddarein Oasis	180	Wadi	Wadi Ejwali	
Mauritania	Adrar	Taizent Oasis	213	Wadi	Wadi Atar	
Mauritania	Adrar	Tanouchert Oasis	415	Erg		
Mauritania	Adrar	Tawaz Oasis	276	Wadi	Wadi Atar	
Mauritania	Adrar	Tentane Oasis	173	Depression		
Mauritania	Adrar	Terjit Oasis	313	Wadi	Wadi Atar	
Mauritania	Adrar	Timinite Oasis	195	Erg		
Mauritania	Adrar	Tirebane Oasis	235	Wadi	Wadi Ejwali	
Mauritania	Adrar	Toueizikt Oasis	261	Wadi	Wadi Atar	
Mauritania	Adrar	Toungat Oasis	190	Wadi	Wadi Al Abiad	
Mauritania	Hodh ech Chargui	Boukhzama Oasis	250	Mountain		
Mauritania	Hodh ech Chargui	Nema Oasis	259	Mountain		
Mauritania	Hodh ech Chargui	Oualata Oasis	240	Depression		
Mauritania	Tagant	Acharim Oasis	368	Wadi	Wadi Al Nahar Al Abiad	
Mauritania	Tagant	Agnana Oasis	230	Wadi	Wadi Tidjikja	
Mauritania	Tagant	Baghdada Oasis	410	Wadi	Wadi Tidjikja	
Mauritania	Tagant	Borelle Eglieg Oasis	416	Wadi	Wadi Tidjikja	
Mauritania	Tagant	Debaye El Ghadi Oasis	400	Wadi	Wadi Tidjikja	
Mauritania	Tagant	Dendane Oasis	237	Wadi	Wadi Al Nahar Al Abiad	
Mauritania	Tagant	Edwalgue Oasis	106	Wadi	Wadi Al Nahar Al Abiad	
Mauritania	Tagant	El Housseiniya Oasis	126	Wadi	Wadi Al Nahar Al Abiad	
Mauritania	Tagant	El Joumlanya Oasis	111	Depression		
Mauritania	Tagant	El Mechra Oasis	113	Depression		
Mauritania	Tagant	Entitam Oasis	109	Wadi	Wadi Al Nahar Al Abiad	
Mauritania	Tagant	El Ghoudia Oasis	408	Wadi	Wadi Tidjikja	
Mauritania	Tagant	Ksar El Barka Oasis	134	Wadi	Wadi Callaha	
Mauritania	Tagant	El Ahouetat Oasis	352	Wadi	Wadi Tidjikja	
Mauritania	Tagant	N'Beika Oasis	112	Wadi	Wadi Al Nahar Al Abiad	
Mauritania	Tagant	Nejam Oasis	443	Wadi	Wadi Tidjikja	
Mauritania	Tagant	Rachid Oasis	269	Wadi	Wadi Tidjikja	
Mauritania	Tagant	Talmest Oasis	252	Wadi	Wadi Tidjikja	
Mauritania	Tagant	Taoujafet Oasis	199	Wadi	Wadi Al Abiad	
Mauritania	Tagant	Tichitt Oasis	188	Depression		
Mauritania	Tagant	Tidjikja Oasis	396	Wadi	Wadi Tidjikja	
Mauritania	Assaba	El Ajoue Oasis	89	Wadi	Wadi Qurugel	
Mauritania	Assaba	Guerou Oasis	170	Depression		
Mauritania	Assaba	Kamour Oasis	174	Depression		
Mauritania	Assaba	Ntakat Oasis	146	Depression		
Mauritania	Assaba	Tagada El Wassa Oasis	194	Depression		
Mauritania	Assaba	Tegadit Iriji Oasis	173	Mountain		
Mauritania	Hodh el Gharbi	Kobenni Oasis	208	Depression		
Mauritania	Guidimaka	Kankossa Oasis	80	Wadi	Wadi Karakoro	
Morocco	Oriental	Ain Chair Oasis	969	Mountain		
Morocco	Oriental	Ain Chouater Oasis	769	Wadi	Wadi Zelmou	
Morocco	Oriental	Bouanane Oasis	860	Wadi	Wadi Bouanane	
Morocco	Oriental	Figuig Oasis	886	Mountain		
Morocco	Oriental	Gafait Oasis	787	Wadi	Wadi Za	
Morocco	Oriental	Ksar El Hajoui Oasis	827	Wadi	Wadi El Hajoui	
Morocco	Oriental	Takoumit Oasis	874	Wadi	Wadi Bouanane	
Morocco	Drâa-Tafilalet	Afra Oasis	878	Wadi	Wadi Draa	
Morocco	Drâa-Tafilalet	Agdz Oasis	928	Wadi	Wadi Draa	
Morocco	Drâa-Tafilalet	Aguinane Oasis	1191	Wadi	Wadi Asif Bu Aguinane	
Morocco	Drâa-Tafilalet	Ait Aissa Oasis	1000	Wadi	Wadi Ouhmidi	
Morocco	Drâa-Tafilalet	Ait Ben Haddou Oasis	1261	Wadi	Wadi El Maleh	
Morocco	Drâa-Tafilalet	Ait Ben Omar Oasis	1003	Erg		
Morocco	Drâa-Tafilalet	Ait Ismene et Ihjjamen Oasis	1368	Wadi	Wadi Todra	
Morocco	Drâa-Tafilalet	Ait Issa Ou Brahim Oasis	1187	Wadi	Wadi Assif	
Morocco	Drâa-Tafilalet	Ait Mrabet Oasis	942	Wadi	Wadi Ouhmidi	
Morocco	Drâa-Tafilalet	Ait Saoun Oasis	1613	Mountain		
Morocco	Drâa-Tafilalet	Ait Semghane Oasis	1115	Mountain		
Morocco	Drâa-Tafilalet	Ait Senan Oasis	1390	Wadi	Wadi Todgha	
Morocco	Drâa-Tafilalet	Ait Tizgui Oasis	1421	Wadi	Wadi Todgha	
Morocco	Drâa-Tafilalet	Akhlouf Oasis	797	Wadi	Wadi Draa	
Morocco	Drâa-Tafilalet	Alnif Oasis	873	Wadi	Wadi Alnif	
Morocco	Drâa-Tafilalet	Amazraou Oasis	719	Wadi	Wadi Draa	
Morocco	Drâa-Tafilalet	Amazzer Oasis	1021	Wadi	Wadi Ouhmidi	
Morocco	Drâa-Tafilalet	Ammar Oasis	965	Wadi	Wadi Alnif	
Morocco	Drâa-Tafilalet	Aoufous Oasis	893	Wadi	Wadi Ziz	
Morocco	Drâa-Tafilalet	Azreg Oasis	931	Wadi	Wadi Alnif	
Morocco	Drâa-Tafilalet	Beni Zouli Oasis	755	Wadi	Wadi Draa	
Morocco	Drâa-Tafilalet	Blaghema Oasis	872	Wadi	Wadi Ziz	
Morocco	Drâa-Tafilalet	Douira Oasis	858	Wadi	Wadi Ziz	
Morocco	Drâa-Tafilalet	Douirat Oasis	775	Wadi	Wadi Draa	
Morocco	Drâa-Tafilalet	El Borj Oasis	886	Wadi	Wadi Ait Douchen	
Morocco	Drâa-Tafilalet	El Jorf Oasis	817	Wadi	Wadi Gheris	
Morocco	Drâa-Tafilalet	El Morabitine Oasis	1201	Wadi	Wadi Todgha	
Morocco	Drâa-Tafilalet	Erfoud Oasis	808	Wadi	Wadi Ziz	
Morocco	Drâa-Tafilalet	Errachidia Oasis	1028	Wadi	Wadi Ziz	
Morocco	Drâa-Tafilalet	Essifa Oasis	771	Wadi	Wadi Gheris	
Morocco	Drâa-Tafilalet	Fezna Oasis	835	Wadi	Wadi Gheris	
Morocco	Drâa-Tafilalet	Finnt Oasis	1180	Wadi	Wadi Ait Douchen	
Morocco	Drâa-Tafilalet	Goulmima Oasis	1024	Wadi	Wadi Gheris	
Morocco	Drâa-Tafilalet	Hassilabied Oasis	713	Erg		
Morocco	Drâa-Tafilalet	Ighrem Agoudim Oasis	1161	Wadi	Wadi Todgh	
Morocco	Drâa-Tafilalet	Igoudmane Oasis	1306	Mountain		
Morocco	Drâa-Tafilalet	Intliten Oasis	940	Wadi	Wadi Draa	
Morocco	Drâa-Tafilalet	Irbibene Oasis	1207	Wadi	Wadi Todgh	
Morocco	Drâa-Tafilalet	Irhels Oasis	1348	Wadi	Wadi Ighls	
Morocco	Drâa-Tafilalet	Isfalem Oasis	958	Wadi	Wadi Draa	
Morocco	Drâa-Tafilalet	Isilf Oasis	978	Wadi	Wadi Todgha	
Morocco	Drâa-Tafilalet	Ksar Beni Kalouf Oasis	696	Wadi	Wadi Draa	
Morocco	Drâa-Tafilalet	Ksar Beni Ozayem Oasis	927	Wadi	Wadi Guir	
Morocco	Drâa-Tafilalet	Ksar Boudenib Oasis	949	Wadi	Wadi Guir	
Morocco	Drâa-Tafilalet	Ksar Hannabou Oasis	792	Wadi	Wadi Gheris	
Morocco	Drâa-Tafilalet	Ksar Nasrate Oasis	599	Wadi	Wadi Draa	
Morocco	Drâa-Tafilalet	Ksar Sahli Oasis	914	Wadi	Wadi Guir	
Morocco	Drâa-Tafilalet	Ksar Tazougart Oasis	1064	Wadi	Wadi Guir	
Morocco	Drâa-Tafilalet	Ksar Tissergate Oasis	737	Wadi	Wadi Draa	
Morocco	Drâa-Tafilalet	Ksar Touroug Oasis	898	Wadi	Wadi Todgha/Gheris	
Morocco	Drâa-Tafilalet	Lamkatra Oasis	763	Wadi	Wadi Draa	
Morocco	Drâa-Tafilalet	Lhadouane Oasis	1249	Wadi	Wadi Todra	
Morocco	Drâa-Tafilalet	M Hamid el Ghizlane Oasis	549	Wadi	Wadi Draa	
Morocco	Drâa-Tafilalet	Mezguida Oasis	770	Wadi	Wadi Ziz	
Morocco	Drâa-Tafilalet	Nkob Oasis	1045	Wadi	Wadi Akka Aounzerf	
Morocco	Drâa-Tafilalet	Ouarzazate Oasis	1120	Wadi	Wadi Iriri	
Morocco	Drâa-Tafilalet	Oulad Aissa Oasis	917	Wadi	Wadi Ziz	
Morocco	Drâa-Tafilalet	Oulad Edriss Oasis	564	Wadi	Wadi Draa	
Morocco	Drâa-Tafilalet	Oulad Yahia Lagraire Oasis	828	Wadi	Wadi Draa	
Morocco	Drâa-Tafilalet	Ouled Otmane Oasis	858	Wadi	Wadi Draa	
Morocco	Drâa-Tafilalet	Ramlia Oasis	621	Erg		
Morocco	Drâa-Tafilalet	Rgabi Ait Hssou Oasis	567	Wadi	Wadi Draa	
Morocco	Drâa-Tafilalet	Rissani Oasis	760	Wadi	Wadi Ziz	
Morocco	Drâa-Tafilalet	Sijilmasa Oasis	760	Wadi	Wadi Ziz	
Morocco	Drâa-Tafilalet	Skoura Oasis	1224	Wadi	Wadi El Hajaj	
Morocco	Drâa-Tafilalet	Tadighoust Oasis	1107	Wadi	Wadi Gheris	
Morocco	Drâa-Tafilalet	Tafounante Oasis	1370	Wadi	Wadi Ait Douchen	
Morocco	Drâa-Tafilalet	Taghzoute N Ait Atta Oasis	1178	Wadi	Wadi Todra	
Morocco	Drâa-Tafilalet	Taguenzalt Oasis	1317	Wadi	Wadi Iriri	
Morocco	Drâa-Tafilalet	Talamzit Oasis	905	Wadi	Wadi Draa	
Morocco	Drâa-Tafilalet	Talat Oasis	910	Wadi	Wadi Ouhmidi	
Morocco	Drâa-Tafilalet	Taltfraout Oasis	1083	Mountain		
Morocco	Drâa-Tafilalet	Tamegroute Oasis	685	Wadi	Wadi Draa	
Morocco	Drâa-Tafilalet	Tamellalt Oasis	959	Wadi	Wadi Todgha	
Morocco	Drâa-Tafilalet	Tamezmoute Oasis	842	Wadi	Wadi Draa	
Morocco	Drâa-Tafilalet	Tamkasselt Oasis	879	Wadi	Wadi Draa	
Morocco	Drâa-Tafilalet	Tamnougalt Oasis	914	Wadi	Wadi Draa	
Morocco	Drâa-Tafilalet	Tansikht Oasis	862	Wadi	Wadi Draa	
Morocco	Drâa-Tafilalet	Taoudaate Oasis	1406	Mountain		
Morocco	Drâa-Tafilalet	Targa El Mal Oasis	884	Wadi	Wadi Draa	
Morocco	Drâa-Tafilalet	Tarmigt Oasis	1257	Wadi	Wadi Ait Douchen	
Morocco	Drâa-Tafilalet	Tassawant Oasis	1095	Mountain		
Morocco	Drâa-Tafilalet	Tastifte Oasis	877	Wadi	Wadi Ouhmidi	
Morocco	Drâa-Tafilalet	Tazarine Oasis	852	Mountain		
Morocco	Drâa-Tafilalet	Tighit Oasis	899	Wadi	Wadi Draa	
Morocco	Drâa-Tafilalet	Tikchtat Oasis	785	Wadi	Wadi Draa	
Morocco	Drâa-Tafilalet	Tilouine Oasis	941	Wadi	Wadi Gheris	
Morocco	Drâa-Tafilalet	Timiderte Oasis	892	Wadi	Wadi Draa	
Morocco	Drâa-Tafilalet	Tinejdad Oasis	996	Wadi	Wadi Todgha	
Morocco	Drâa-Tafilalet	Tinfoula Oasis	897	Wadi	Wadi Draa	
Morocco	Drâa-Tafilalet	Tinghir Oasis	1282	Wadi	Wadi Todra	
Morocco	Drâa-Tafilalet	Tinighil Oasis	949	Wadi	Wadi Draa	
Morocco	Drâa-Tafilalet	Tinzouline Oasis	799	Wadi	Wadi Draa	
Morocco	Drâa-Tafilalet	Tisslit Oasis	1350	Wadi	Wadi Ait Douchen	
Morocco	Drâa-Tafilalet	Tizgaghine Oasis	988	Erg		
Morocco	Drâa-Tafilalet	Toughza Oasis	837	Wadi	Wadi Alnif	
Morocco	Drâa-Tafilalet	Toundoute Oasis	1554	Wadi	Wadi El Hajaj	
Morocco	Drâa-Tafilalet	Zagora Oasis	724	Wadi	Wadi Draa	
Morocco	Drâa-Tafilalet	Zaouia Sidi Saleh Oasis	595	Wadi	Wadi Draa	
Morocco	Drâa-Tafilalet	Zaouiet Amelkis Oasis	945	Wadi	Wadi Ziz	
Morocco	Drâa-Tafilalet	Zaouiet Sidi Blal Oasis	1078	Wadi	Wadi Ouhmidi	
Morocco	Drâa-Tafilalet	Zouiya Oasis	1255	Wadi	Wadi El Hajaj	
Morocco	Souss-Massa	Addiss Oasis	599	Wadi	Wadi Tata	
Morocco	Souss-Massa	Adghers N Warflan Oasis	870	Wadi	Wadi Asif Bu Aguinane	
Morocco	Souss-Massa	Agadir Aserghine Oasis	778	Mountain		
Morocco	Souss-Massa	Agoudim Oasis	1558	Wadi	Wadi Souss	
Morocco	Souss-Massa	Agrd Tamanrt Oasis	636	Wadi	Wadi Tamanart	
Morocco	Souss-Massa	Ait Hammane Oasis	461	Wadi	Wadi Ait Ouabelli	
Morocco	Souss-Massa	Ait Mansour Oasis	1256	Wadi	Wadi Tamanart	
Morocco	Souss-Massa	Ait Ouabelli Oasis	474	Wadi	Wadi Ait Ouabelli	
Morocco	Souss-Massa	Akka Ighane Oasis	801	Mountain		
Morocco	Souss-Massa	Akka Oasis	538	Wadi	Wadi Akka	
Morocco	Souss-Massa	Alougoum Oasis	779	Wadi	Wadi Zguid	
Morocco	Souss-Massa	Amadagh Oasis	1048	Wadi	Wadi Tata	
Morocco	Souss-Massa	Anamr Oasis	819	Wadi	Wadi Tamanart	
Morocco	Souss-Massa	Annamer Oasis	1549	Wadi	Wadi Tata	
Morocco	Souss-Massa	Aoukerda Oasis	1130	Mountain		
Morocco	Souss-Massa	Assa Igmir Oasis	1145	Wadi	Wadi Tata	
Morocco	Souss-Massa	Azraga Oasis	1481	Wadi	Wadi Asif Bu Aguinane	
Morocco	Souss-Massa	El Ayn Oasis	767	Wadi	Wadi Asif Bu Aguinane	
Morocco	Souss-Massa	El Kasba Oasis	606	Wadi	Wadi Tamanart	
Morocco	Souss-Massa	El Mhamid Oasis	664	Wadi	Wadi Zguid	
Morocco	Souss-Massa	Fam El Hisn Oasis	478	Wadi	Wadi Tamanart	
Morocco	Souss-Massa	Foum El Oued Oasis	847	Wadi	Wadi Zguid	
Morocco	Souss-Massa	Foum Zguid Oasis	647	Wadi	Wadi Zguid	
Morocco	Souss-Massa	Ibouday Oasis	1049	Wadi	Wadi Tata	
Morocco	Souss-Massa	Icht Oasis	500	Wadi	Wadi Tamanart	
Morocco	Souss-Massa	Ida Ou Lestane Oasis	766	Mountain		
Morocco	Souss-Massa	Ighir-Igiouaz Oasis	600	Wadi	Wadi Tamanart	
Morocco	Souss-Massa	Ighmir Oasis	934	Wadi	Wadi Tamanart	
Morocco	Souss-Massa	Imitek Oasis	783	Wadi	Wadi Ourgine	
Morocco	Souss-Massa	Kiriwt Oasis	1115	Wadi	Wadi Asif Bu Aguinane	
Morocco	Souss-Massa	Oum El Guerdane Oasis	561	Wadi	Wadi Tata	
Morocco	Souss-Massa	Tagueldimt Oasis	1655	Wadi	Wadi Tata	
Morocco	Souss-Massa	Tamssoulte Oasis	790	Wadi	Wadi Tamanart	
Morocco	Souss-Massa	Targa N'hanna Oasis	758	Wadi	Wadi Targa	
Morocco	Souss-Massa	Tata Oasis	700	Wadi	Wadi Tata	
Morocco	Souss-Massa	Tiggane Oasis	550	Wadi	Wadi Tata	
Morocco	Souss-Massa	Tiguissalt Oasis	605	Wadi	Wadi Tata	
Morocco	Souss-Massa	Tiout Oasis	280	Mountain		
Morocco	Souss-Massa	Tisenasamine Oasis	1157	Wadi	Wadi Tata	
Morocco	Souss-Massa	Tissint Oasis	558	Wadi	Wadi Tissint	
Morocco	Souss-Massa	Tizgui Ida ou Baloul Oasis	969	Wadi	Wadi Akka	
Morocco	Souss-Massa	Tizgui N Oufla Oasis	1170	Wadi	Wadi Tata	
Morocco	Souss-Massa	Zawit Oasis	1233	Wadi	Wadi Souss	
Morocco	Souss-Massa	Inraren Oasis	?	?		
Morocco	Guelmim-Oued Noun	Aday Oasis	695	Wadi	Wadi Siyad	
Morocco	Guelmim-Oued Noun	Ait Herbil Oasis	955	Wadi	Wadi Tamanart	
Morocco	Guelmim-Oued Noun	Ait Illou Oasis	696	Wadi	Wadi Siyad	
Morocco	Guelmim-Oued Noun	Amsra Oasis	771	Mountain		
Morocco	Guelmim-Oued Noun	Amtoudi Oasis	871	Wadi	Wadi Tamanart	
Morocco	Guelmim-Oued Noun	Assa Oasis	305	Wadi	Wadi Assa	
Morocco	Guelmim-Oued Noun	Bouizakarne Oasis	620	Mountain		
Morocco	Guelmim-Oued Noun	Ifrane Atlas-Saghir Oasis	768	Wadi	Wadi Ifraane	
Morocco	Guelmim-Oued Noun	Tagant Oasis	531	Wadi	Wadi Tamissouri	
Morocco	Guelmim-Oued Noun	Taghjijt Oasis	573	Wadi	Wadi Siyad	
Morocco	Guelmim-Oued Noun	Tainzert Oasis	646	Wadi	Wadi Siyad	
Morocco	Guelmim-Oued Noun	Tighmert Oasis	287	Wadi	Wadi Siyad	
Morocco	Guelmim-Oued Noun	Tiglit Oasis	305	Wadi	Wadi Dara'a	
Morocco	Guelmim-Oued Noun	Timoulay Oasis	669	Wadi	Wadi Ifraane	
Niger	Agadez	Abardok Oasis	822	Wadi	Wadi Amdigra	
Niger	Agadez	Adaouda Oasis	906	Wadi	Wadi Téloues	
Niger	Agadez	Aney Oasis	393	Depression		
Niger	Agadez	Aouderas Oasis	793	Wadi	Wadi Tamazelak	
Niger	Agadez	Aoukadede Oasis	1477	Depression		
Niger	Agadez	Arlit Oasis	418	Erg		
Niger	Agadez	Bagzan nAmmass Oasis	1537	Depression		
Niger	Agadez	Bilma Oasis	364	Depression		
Niger	Agadez	Debaga Oasis	577	Wadi	Wadi Teloua	
Niger	Agadez	Djado Oasis	447	Depression		
Niger	Agadez	Emalawle Oasis	1458	Depression		
Niger	Agadez	Fachi Oasis	371	Depression		
Niger	Agadez	Iferouane/Afassa Oasis	660	Wadi	Wadi Iberkoum	
Niger	Agadez	Ingall Oasis	487	Wadi	Wadi Tchinakawatane	
Niger	Agadez	Dirkou Oasis	377	Depression		
Niger	Agadez	Seguedine Oasis	415	Depression		
Niger	Agadez	Tabelot Oasis	858	Wadi	Wadi Téloues	
Niger	Agadez	Tadara Oasis	954	Wadi	Wadi Téloues	
Niger	Agadez	Tagabada Oasis	775	Wadi	Wadi Téloues	
Niger	Agadez	Takazanza Oasis	857	Wadi	Wadi Amdigra	
Niger	Agadez	Tassissat Oasis	1530	Depression		
Niger	Agadez	Tchirozerine Oasis	507	Wadi	Wadi Tchirozerine	
Niger	Agadez	Timia Oasis	877	Mountain		
Niger	Diffa	Adebour Oasis	315	Erg		
Niger	Diffa	Cheri Oasis	325	Erg		
Niger	Diffa	Dabalia Oasis	338	Erg		
Niger	Diffa	Ganga Oasis	322	Erg		
Niger	Zinder	Guidimouni Oasis	403	Erg		
Oman	Al Buraymi	A D'lhah Oasis	614	Wadi	Wadi Kadra	
Oman	Al Buraymi	Ajran Oasis	623	Wadi	Wadi Ajran	
Oman	Al Buraymi	Al Wasit Oasis	510	Erg		
Oman	Al Buraymi	Alkhbayn Oasis	658	Wadi	Wadi Hamidah	
Oman	Al Buraymi	Ar Rayy Oasis	549	Wadi	Wadi Hatta	
Oman	Al Buraymi	As Sunainah Oasis	259	Erg		
Oman	Al Buraymi	Daqiq Oasis	827	Wadi	Wadi Kitnah	
Oman	Al Buraymi	Halahil Oasis	802	Wadi	Wadi As Suhayli	
Oman	Al Buraymi	Harim Oasis	742	Wadi	Wadi Ajran	
Oman	Al Buraymi	Kitnah Oasis	669	Wadi	Wadi Kitnah	
Oman	Al Buraymi	Mahdah Oasis	430	Wadi	Wadi Hywan/Musydirah	
Oman	Al Buraymi	Masah Oasis	645	Wadi	Wadi Bid	
Oman	Al Buraymi	Nuway Oasis	451	Wadi	Wadi Sharm	
Oman	Al Buraymi	Rabi Oasis	504	Wadi	Wadi Kitnah	
Oman	Al Batinah North	Al Ablah Oasis	598	Wadi	Wadi As Suhayli	
Oman	Al Batinah North	Al Ghadifah Oasis	470	Wadi	Wadi Sudari	
Oman	Al Batinah North	Al Ghushayn Oasis	605	Wadi	Wadi Shafan	
Oman	Al Batinah North	Al Mahbab Oasis	701	Wadi	Wadi Hawqain	
Oman	Al Batinah North	Al Zuwayhir Oasis	362	Wadi	Wadi Al Sermi	
Oman	Al Batinah North	Bu'ayq Oasis	317	Wadi	Wadi Bani Omar	
Oman	Al Batinah North	Dabah Oasis	655	Wadi	Wadi Hawqain	
Oman	Al Batinah North	Dallah Oasis	657	Wadi	Wadi Shafan	
Oman	Al Batinah North	Farfar Oasis	541	Wadi	Wadi Nasil	
Oman	Al Batinah North	Hailain Oasis	309	Wadi	Wadi Al Jahwir	
Oman	Al Batinah North	Hyad Oasis	659	Wadi	Wadi As Suhayli	
Oman	Al Batinah North	Kanut Oasis	373	Wadi	Wadi Al Sermi	
Oman	Al Batinah North	Khan Oasis	373	Wadi	Wadi Nasil	
Oman	Al Batinah North	Khubaytah Oasis	398	Wadi	Wadi Sudari	
Oman	Al Batinah North	Rajmi Oasis	415	Wadi	Wadi Rajma'a	
Oman	Al Batinah North	Ruqqah Oasis	403	Wadi	Wadi Al Sermi	
Oman	Al Batinah North	Zaymi Oasis	528	Wadi	Wadi Zaymi	
Oman	Al Batinah South	Ad Dif Oasis	524	Wadi	Wadi Hawqain	
Oman	Al Batinah South	Adh Dhahur Oasis	589	Wadi	Wadi Hawqain	
Oman	Al Batinah South	Afi Oasis	229	Wadi	Wadi Afi	
Oman	Al Batinah South	Al Abyad Oasis	215	Wadi	Wadi Far	
Oman	Al Batinah South	Al Awabi Oasis	497	Wadi	Wadi Bani Kharous	
Oman	Al Batinah South	Al Far Oasis	466	Wadi	Wadi Ban Awf	
Oman	Al Batinah South	Al Hajir Oasis	1121	Mountain		
Oman	Al Batinah South	Al Hijir Oasis	686	Mountain		
Oman	Al Batinah South	Al Jamma Oasis	137	Depression		
Oman	Al Batinah South	Al Madinah Oasis	343	Wadi	Wadi Hawqain	
Oman	Al Batinah South	Al Manazif Oasis	399	Wadi	Wadi Hawqain	
Oman	Al Batinah South	Al Maydan Oasis	616	Wadi	Wadi Hawqain	
Oman	Al Batinah South	Al Misfah Oasis	208	Wadi	Wadi Misfah	
Oman	Al Batinah South	Al Ulyah Oasis	877	Wadi	Wadi Musfa	
Oman	Al Batinah South	Al Wishayl Oasis	257	Wadi	Wadi Misfah	
Oman	Al Batinah South	An Nid Oasis	812	Wadi	Wadi Sahtan	
Oman	Al Batinah South	Ar Rajlah Oasis	559	Wadi	Wadi Hawqain	
Oman	Al Batinah South	Ash Shibika Oasis	200	Wadi	Wadi Misfah	
Oman	Al Batinah South	At Tabaqah Oasis	457	Wadi	Wadi Sahtan	
Oman	Al Batinah South	Bald Sayt Oasis	976	Mountain		
Oman	Al Batinah South	Daris Oasis	168	Depression		
Oman	Al Batinah South	Falaj Bani Umar Oasis	189	Wadi	Wadi Misfah	
Oman	Al Batinah South	Fasah Oasis	622	Wadi	Wadi Sahtan	
Oman	Al Batinah South	Hawqayn Oasis	242	Wadi	Wadi Hawqain	
Oman	Al Batinah South	Hayjar Oasis	748	Wadi	Wadi Bani Kharous	
Oman	Al Batinah South	Hayl as Sawaluh Oasis	598	Wadi	Wadi Hawqain	
Oman	Al Batinah South	Hibra Oasis	187	Depression		
Oman	Al Batinah South	Istal Oasis	671	Wadi	Wadi Bani Kharous	
Oman	Al Batinah South	Khadra Oasis	515	Wadi	Wadi Sahtan	
Oman	Al Batinah South	Khafdi Oasis	445	Wadi	Wadi Hawqain	
Oman	Al Batinah South	Nakhal Oasis	323	Mountain		
Oman	Al Batinah South	Rustaq Oasis	348	Wadi	Wadi Al Kur	
Oman	Al Batinah South	Sini Oasis	648	Wadi	Wadi Hawqain	
Oman	Al Batinah South	Sunaybah Oasis	725	Wadi	Wadi Bani Kharous	
Oman	Al Batinah South	Wadi Bani Harras Oasis	766	Wadi	Wadi Bani Harras	
Oman	Al Batinah South	Yiqa Oasis	553	Wadi	Wadi Hawqain	
Oman	Muscat	Al Jeela Oasis	486	Wadi	Wadi Ash Shab	
Oman	Muscat	Al Khoud Old Oasis	82	Wadi	Wadi Al Khoud	
Oman	Muscat	Hayl Al Ghaf Oasis	50	Depression		
Oman	Muscat	Siya Oasis	298	Wadi	Wadi Sasrin	
Oman	Al Dhahirah	Al Ayn Oasis	639	Wadi	Wadi Al Ayn	
Oman	Al Dhahirah	Al Basatin Oasis	867	Wadi	Wadi Al Hijr	
Oman	Al Dhahirah	Al Hawmaniyah Oasis	541	Wadi	Wadi Shumayt	
Oman	Al Dhahirah	Al Hayl Oasis	689	Wadi	Wadi Al Ayn	
Oman	Al Dhahirah	Al Hayyal Oasis	529	Wadi	Wadi Habis	
Oman	Al Dhahirah	Al Hijr Oasis	678	Wadi	Wadi Al Hijr	
Oman	Al Dhahirah	Al Wuqbah Oasis	719	Wadi	Wadi Bayha	
Oman	Al Dhahirah	An Nujayd Oasis	596	Wadi	Wadi Ibat	
Oman	Al Dhahirah	Bid'ah Oasis	913	Wadi	Wadi Shumayt	
Oman	Al Dhahirah	Bulaydah Oasis	776	Wadi	Wadi Bulaydah	
Oman	Al Dhahirah	Damm Oasis	725	Wadi	Wadi Damm	
Oman	Al Dhahirah	Dhank Oasis	343	Wadi	Wadi Dank	
Oman	Al Dhahirah	Harat Al Hisin Oasis	399	Wadi	Wadi Dank	
Oman	Al Dhahirah	Harat Khatu Oasis	464	Wadi	Wadi Dank	
Oman	Al Dhahirah	Ibri Oasis	360	Wadi	Wadi Al Ayn	
Oman	Al Dhahirah	Kahanat Oasis	692	Wadi	Wadi/Hamada	
Oman	Al Dhahirah	Maqabil Oasis	490	Erg		
Oman	Al Dhahirah	Maqniyat Oasis	702	Wadi	Wadi Maqniyat	
Oman	Al Dhahirah	Miskin Oasis	647	Wadi	Wadi Ibat	
Oman	Al Dhahirah	Yanqul Oasis	565	Wadi	Wadi Dank	
Oman	Ad Dakhiliyah	Adam Oasis	283	Wadi	Wadi Al Athl	
Oman	Ad Dakhiliyah	Al Ayshah Oasis	585	Wadi	Wadi Al Khahfa/As Safil	
Oman	Ad Dakhiliyah	Al Ghafat Oasis	549	Wadi	Wadi Sayfam	
Oman	Ad Dakhiliyah	Al Hamra Oasis	647	Wadi	Wadi Al Hamra	
Oman	Ad Dakhiliyah	Al Jirayfat Oasis	766	Wadi	Wadi Nakhr	
Oman	Ad Dakhiliyah	Al Qariyatain Oasis	561	Wadi	Wadi Qant	
Oman	Ad Dakhiliyah	Bahla Oasis	569	Wadi	Wadi Al Munbuk	
Oman	Ad Dakhiliyah	Bidbid Oasis	218	Wadi	Wadi Bidbid	
Oman	Ad Dakhiliyah	Bilad Sayt Oasis	632	Wadi	Wadi Almantaq	
Oman	Ad Dakhiliyah	Birkat Al Mouz Oasis	565	Wadi	Wadi Wasit	
Oman	Ad Dakhiliyah	Fanja Oasis	169	Wadi	Wadi Fanja	
Oman	Ad Dakhiliyah	Imti Oasis	594	Wadi	Wadi Al Hajar	
Oman	Ad Dakhiliyah	Izki Oasis	550	Wadi	Wadi Al Hajar	
Oman	Ad Dakhiliyah	Ma'bas Oasis	583	Depression		
Oman	Ad Dakhiliyah	Manah Oasis	422	Depression		
Oman	Ad Dakhiliyah	Manal Oasis	523	Wadi	Wadi Qari	
Oman	Ad Dakhiliyah	Masram Oasis	710	Wadi	Wadi Muharram	
Oman	Ad Dakhiliyah	Misfat Al Abriyyin Oasis	915	Wadi	Wadi Maqal	
Oman	Ad Dakhiliyah	Muskaysa Oasis	630	Wadi	Wadi Qant	
Oman	Ad Dakhiliyah	Nida Oasis	439	Wadi	Wadi Assijani	
Oman	Ad Dakhiliyah	Nizwa Oasis	522	Wadi	Wadi Sumayt	
Oman	Ad Dakhiliyah	Said Oasis	568	Wadi	Wadi Qari	
Oman	Ad Dakhiliyah	Samail Oasis	368	Wadi	Wadi Samail	
Oman	Ad Dakhiliyah	Saroor Oasis	260	Wadi	Wadi Bidbid	
Oman	Ad Dakhiliyah	Sajae Oasis	495	Wadi	Wadi Sumail	
Oman	Ad Dakhiliyah	Sayq Oasis	1867	Mountain		
Oman	Ad Dakhiliyah	Tanuf Oasis	616	Wadi	Wadi Tanuf	
Oman	Ad Dakhiliyah	Wadi Al Ala Oasis	605	Wadi	Wadi Al Ala	
Oman	Ad Dakhiliyah	Wusad Oasis	546	Wadi	Wadi Qari	
Oman	Ash Sharqiyah North	Al Buwaiten Oasis	401	Depression		
Oman	Ash Sharqiyah North	Al Fath Oasis	429	Depression		
Oman	Ash Sharqiyah North	Al Hammam Oasis	434	Wadi	Wadi Al Khabbah	
Oman	Ash Sharqiyah North	Al Khadra Oasis	484	Wadi	Wadi Indam	
Oman	Ash Sharqiyah North	Al Khashabah Oasis	420	Depression		
Oman	Ash Sharqiyah North	Al Mudaireb Oasis	358	Wadi	Wadi Aghda	
Oman	Ash Sharqiyah North	Al Mudaybi Oasis	402	Depression		
Oman	Ash Sharqiyah North	Al Muktra Oasis	428	Depression		
Oman	Ash Sharqiyah North	Al Qabil Oasis	432	Wadi	Wadi Al Lithili	
Oman	Ash Sharqiyah North	Al Rawdha Oasis	607	Wadi	Wadi Musfa	
Oman	Ash Sharqiyah North	Al Ruddah Oasis	373	Depression		
Oman	Ash Sharqiyah North	Al Wafi Oasis	395	Wadi	Wadi Indam	
Oman	Ash Sharqiyah North	Al Wasil Oasis	315	Depression		
Oman	Ash Sharqiyah North	An Niba Oasis	406	Wadi	Wadi Aghda	
Oman	Ash Sharqiyah North	Aqda'a Oasis	393	Wadi	Wadi Al Khabbah	
Oman	Ash Sharqiyah North	As Sarm Oasis	424	Wadi	Wadi Aghda	
Oman	Ash Sharqiyah North	As Sumayiyyah Oasis	453	Wadi	Wadi Al Khabbah	
Oman	Ash Sharqiyah North	Awf Oasis	657	Wadi	Wadi Shuriji	
Oman	Ash Sharqiyah North	Ayn Al Khashen Oasis	446	Wadi	Wadi Manqa	
Oman	Ash Sharqiyah North	Batin Oasis	438	Wadi	Wadi Aghda	
Oman	Ash Sharqiyah North	Bdh Oasis	722	Wadi	Wadi Bani Khalid	
Oman	Ash Sharqiyah North	Bidiyah Oasis	293	Depression		
Oman	Ash Sharqiyah North	Hilm Oasis	900	Wadi	Wadi Manqal	
Oman	Ash Sharqiyah North	Haul Oasis	600	Wadi	Wadi Manqal	
Oman	Ash Sharqiyah North	Hubat Oasis	547	Wadi	Wadi Musfa	
Oman	Ash Sharqiyah North	Ibra Oasis	479	Wadi	Wadi Nam	
Oman	Ash Sharqiyah North	Kharma Oasis	521	Wadi	Wadi Qant	
Oman	Ash Sharqiyah North	Lizq Oasis	490	Depression		
Oman	Ash Sharqiyah North	Maqta Oasis	389	Wadi	Wadi Bani Khalid	
Oman	Ash Sharqiyah North	Miss Oasis	591	Wadi	Wadi Wasit	
Oman	Ash Sharqiyah North	Munjarid Oasis	409	Wadi	Wadi Aghda	
Oman	Ash Sharqiyah North	Naqsi Oasis	652	Wadi	Wadi Wasit	
Oman	Ash Sharqiyah North	Sabt Oasis	339	Wadi	Wadi Bani Khalid	
Oman	Ash Sharqiyah North	Samad Al Shan Oasis	572	Wadi	Wadi Musfa	
Oman	Ash Sharqiyah North	Saman Oasis	506	Wadi	Wadi Shuriji	
Oman	Ash Sharqiyah North	Sinaw Oasis	357	Depression		
Oman	Ash Sharqiyah North	Saut Al Khadima Oasis	306	Wadi	Wadi Al Khabbah	
Oman	Ash Sharqiyah North	Al Rakaikh Oasis	327	Wadi	Wadi Al Khabbah	
Oman	Ash Sharqiyah North	Mehlah Oasis	348	Wadi	Wadi Al Khabbah	
Oman	Ash Sharqiyah North	Tool Oasis	271	Wadi	Wadi Al Khabbah	
Oman	Ash Sharqiyah North	Ulyah Oasis	394	Wadi	Wadi Al Khabbah	
Oman	Ash Sharqiyah North	Uyun Oasis	311	Depression		
Oman	Ash Sharqiyah North	Wadi Bani Khalid Oasis	669	Wadi	Wadi Bani Khalid	
Oman	Ash Sharqiyah South	Al Kamil Oasis	160	Wadi	Wadi Bani Khalid	
Oman	Ash Sharqiyah South	Bani Bu Ali Oasis	?	Wadi	Wadi Bani Khalid	
Oman	Ash Sharqiyah South	Jalan Bani Buhassan Oasis	108	Wadi	Wadi Bani Khalid	
Oman	Ash Sharqiyah South	Sayma Oasis	260	Wadi	Wadi Tiwi	
Oman	Dhofar	Salalah Oasis	8	Depression		
Saudi Arabia	Al Jawf	Dumat Al-Jandal Oasis	584	Depression		
Saudi Arabia	Tabuk	Tayma Oasis	812	Depression		
Saudi Arabia	Ash Sharqiyah	Al Ahsa Oasis	149	Depression		
Saudi Arabia	Ash Sharqiyah	Al Hafayer Oasis	180	Depression		
Saudi Arabia	Ash Sharqiyah	Yabrin Oasis	173	Depression		
Saudi Arabia	Al Madinah	Al Disah Oasis	564	Wadi	Wadi Al Disah	
Saudi Arabia	Al Madinah	Al Mindassah Oasis	533	Wadi	Wadi Al Himd	
Saudi Arabia	Al Madinah	Al Ula Oasis	692	Wadi	Wadi Al Ula	
Saudi Arabia	Al Madinah	Buwat Oasis	493	Wadi	Wadi Buwat	
Saudi Arabia	Al Madinah	Khaibar Oasis	714	Wadi	Wadi Idam	
Saudi Arabia	Al Madinah	Kale Oasis	701	Wadi	Wadi Idam	
Saudi Arabia	Al Madinah	Medinah Oasis	584	Wadi	Wadi Aqiq	
Saudi Arabia	Al Madinah	Mogayra Oasis	583	Depression		
Saudi Arabia	Al Madinah	Shajwa Oasis	554	Wadi	Wadi Al Himd	
Saudi Arabia	Ar Riyad	Al Diriyyah Oasis	658	Wadi	Wadi Hanifah	
Saudi Arabia	Ar Riyad	Al Hariq Oasis	675	Mountain		
Saudi Arabia	Ar Riyad	Al Hulwah Oasis	594	Wadi	Wadi Barik	
Saudi Arabia	Ar Riyad	Howtat Bani Tamim Oasis	575	Wadi	Wadi Barik	
Saudi Arabia	Ar Riyad	Naam Oasis	635	Mountain		
Saudi Arabia	Makkah	Al Gharith Oasis	1083	Wadi	Wadi Turba	
Saudi Arabia	Najran	Najran Oasis	1307	Wadi	Wadi Najran	
Syria	Damascus	Ghouta Oasis	?	?		
Tunisia	Gafsa	El Guettar Oasis	224	Mountain		
Tunisia	Gafsa	Gafsa Oasis	281	Wadi	Wadi Baiash	
Tunisia	Tozeur	Chebika Oasis	115	Mountain		
Tunisia	Tozeur	Dguache Oasis	48	Depression		
Tunisia	Tozeur	Hammat Al Jarid Oasis	40	Depression		
Tunisia	Tozeur	Midès Oasis	367	Wadi	Wadi Al Adwi	
Tunisia	Tozeur	Naftah Oasis	35	Depression		
Tunisia	Tozeur	Tamaqzah Oasis	276	Wadi	Wadi Tamaqzah	
Tunisia	Tozeur	Tamerza Oasis	?	Mountain		
Tunisia	Tozeur	Tozeur Oasis	36	Depression		
Tunisia	Kebili	Blidet Oasis	32	Depression		
Tunisia	Kebili	Douz Oasis	63	Depression		
Tunisia	Kebili	El Faouar Oasis	51	Depression		
Tunisia	Kebili	Es Sabria Oasis	57	Depression		
Tunisia	Kebili	Ghidma Oasis	27	Depression		
Tunisia	Kebili	Jamnah Oasis	46	Depression		
Tunisia	Kebili	Kebili Oasis	35	Depression		
Tunisia	Kebili	Ksar Ghilane Oasis	210	Erg		
Tunisia	Kebili	Nouail Oasis	32	Depression		
Tunisia	Kebili	Radhouan Oasis	112	Depression		
Tunisia	Kebili	Steftimi Oasis	40	Depression		
Tunisia	Kebili	Souk Lahad Oasis	63	Depression		
Tunisia	Kebili	Telmine Oasis	24	Depression		
Tunisia	Gabès	Al Hammah Oasis	58	Depression		
Tunisia	Gabès	Al Zar At Oasis	18	Wadi	Wadi Tarmaman	
Tunisia	Gabès	Ben Ghilouf Oasis	37	Depression		
Tunisia	Gabès	El Mdou Oasis	49	Wadi	Wadi Gabès	
Tunisia	Gabès	Gabès Oasis	15	Wadi	Wadi Gabès	
Tunisia	Gabès	Kettana Oasis	28	Wadi	Wadi Al Hajal	
Tunisia	Gabès	Mareth Oasis	43	Wadi	Wadi Tarmaman	
Tunisia	Gabès	Metouia Oasis	24	Depression		
Tunisia	Gabès	Oudref Oasis	25	Wadi	Wadi Al Maleh	
Tunisia	Médenine	Ksar Hallouf Oasis	450	Wadi	Wadi Al Hallouf	
Tunisia	Tataouine	Ksar El Ferich Oasis	276	Wadi	Wadi Al Kosh	
Tunisia	Tataouine	Ksar Ouled Debbab Oasis	298	Wadi	Wadi Al Khmah	
Tunisia	Tataouine	Ksar Tlalet Oasis	232	Wadi	Wadi Tlalet	
Tunisia	Tataouine	Ksar Daghara Oasis	300	Wadi	Wadi	
Tunisia	Tataouine	Tataouine Oasis	307	Wadi	Wadi Tataouine	
Turkmenistan; Uzbekistan	Daşoguz Province; Karakalpakstan	Khorezm Oasis	?	?		
United Arab Emirates	Abu Dhabi	Al Ain Oasis	292	Erg		
United Arab Emirates	Abu Dhabi	Liwa Oasis	130	Erg		
Yemen	Hadramawt	Abdullah Gharib Oasis	281	Wadi	Wadi Hima	
Yemen	Hadramawt	Ad-Dees Ash-Sharqia Oasis	95	Wadi	Wadi Omar	
Yemen	Hadramawt	Al Hawi Oasis	663	Wadi	Wadi Hadramawt	
Yemen	Hadramawt	Al Jadidah Oasis	1068	Wadi	Wadi Dawan	
Yemen	Hadramawt	Al Jaha Oasis	310	Wadi	Wadi Bdsh	
Yemen	Hadramawt	Al Khamilah Oasis	1043	Wadi	Wadi 'Amad	
Yemen	Hadramawt	Al Khuraibah Oasis	1039	Wadi	Wadi Dawan	
Yemen	Hadramawt	Al Qatn Oasis	678	Wadi	Wadi Hadramawt	
Yemen	Hadramawt	Alaqqad Oasis	672	Wadi	Wadi Hadramawt	
Yemen	Hadramawt	Alghurfa Oasis	651	Wadi	Wadi Hadramawt	
Yemen	Hadramawt	Alkhamra Oasis	738	Wadi	Wadi Adim	
Yemen	Hadramawt	Alqaria Oasis	593	Wadi	Wadi Al Masilah	
Yemen	Hadramawt	Alrudood Oasis	642	Wadi	Wadi Adim	
Yemen	Hadramawt	Alsowm Oasis	563	Wadi	Wadi Al Masilah	
Yemen	Hadramawt	Alwahd Oasis	769	Wadi	Wadi Adim	
Yemen	Hadramawt	Amd Oasis	917	Wadi	Wadi 'Amad	
Yemen	Hadramawt	Anag Oasis	881	Wadi	Wadi 'Amad	
Yemen	Hadramawt	Ard Ar Raydah Oasis	736	Wadi	Wadi Adim	
Yemen	Hadramawt	As Sadarah Oasis	423	Wadi	Wadi Hajr	
Yemen	Hadramawt	Bdsh Oasis	496	Wadi	Wadi Bdsh	
Yemen	Hadramawt	Budah Oasis	950	Wadi	Wadi Dawan	
Yemen	Hadramawt	Einat Oasis	590	Wadi	Wadi Al Masilah	
Yemen	Hadramawt	Araf Oasis	303	Wadi	Wadi 'Araf	
Yemen	Hadramawt	El Ghebel Oasis	346	Wadi	Wadi 'Asad	
Yemen	Hadramawt	El Hadala Oasis	270	Wadi	Wadi 'Asad	
Yemen	Hadramawt	El Huf Oasis	314	Wadi	Wadi 'Asad	
Yemen	Hadramawt	El Mar Oasis	700	Wadi	Wadi Raghdun	
Yemen	Hadramawt	Ghayl Bin Yamin Oasis	830	Wadi	Wadi Yusen	
Yemen	Hadramawt	Ghayl Ba Wazir Oasis	95	Mountain		
Yemen	Hadramawt	Gromedh Oasis	973	Wadi	Wadi 'Amad	
Yemen	Hadramawt	Haid al-Jazil Oasis	1025	Wadi	Wadi Dawan	
Yemen	Hadramawt	Hair El Ghezid Oasis	989	Wadi	Wadi Dawan	
Yemen	Hadramawt	Halfun Oasis	93	Depression		
Yemen	Hadramawt	Halit Oasis	976	Wadi	Wadi 'Amad	
Yemen	Hadramawt	Hamam Oasis	92	Depression		
Yemen	Hadramawt	Haqab Oasis	418	Wadi	Wadi Haqab	
Yemen	Hadramawt	Hawl Oasis	1075	Wadi	Wadi Hajr	
Yemen	Hadramawt	Hisn Ba Qirdan Oasis	376	Wadi	Wadi Hajr	
Yemen	Hadramawt	Husun As Sufayara' Oasis	586	Wadi	Wadi Al Masilah	
Yemen	Hadramawt	Huwaibah Oasis	586	Wadi	Wadi Dawan	
Yemen	Hadramawt	Jahi Oasis	821	Wadi	Wadi Dawan	
Yemen	Hadramawt	Jahiz Oasis	924	Wadi	Wadi 'Amad	
Yemen	Hadramawt	Khaborah Oasis	6	Wadi	Wadi Hajr	
Yemen	Hadramawt	Mahmeddah Oasis	410	Wadi	Wadi Muhamadh	
Yemen	Hadramawt	Masna'ah Oasis	360	Wadi	Wadi Hajr	
Yemen	Hadramawt	Moa'ber Oasis	80	Wadi	Wadi Moa'ber	
Yemen	Hadramawt	Qaidun Oasis	826	Wadi	Wadi Dawan	
Yemen	Hadramawt	Qarn Salifi Oasis	909	Wadi	Wadi Hajr	
Yemen	Hadramawt	Qurayyah Oasis	963	Wadi	Wadi 'Amad	
Yemen	Hadramawt	Sana Oasis	533	Wadi	Wadi Sana	
Yemen	Hadramawt	Seiyun Oasis	648	Wadi	Wadi Hadramawt	
Yemen	Hadramawt	Sha'b al-Nur Oasis	233	Wadi	Wadi 'Araf	
Yemen	Hadramawt	Shibam Oasis	667	Wadi	Wadi Hadramawt	
Yemen	Hadramawt	Shuh Oasis	986	Wadi	Wadi Rakhih	
Yemen	Hadramawt	Sif Oasis	885	Wadi	Wadi Dawan	
Yemen	Hadramawt	Subalkh Oasis	1136	Wadi	Wadi Dawan	
Yemen	Hadramawt	Tabalah Oasis	88	Wadi	Wadi 'Araf	
Yemen	Hadramawt	Taribah Oasis	628	Wadi	Wadi Hadramawt	
Yemen	Hadramawt	Tarim Oasis	614	Wadi	Wadi Al Masilah	
Yemen	Hadramawt	Taulabah Oasis	1186	Wadi	Wadi Dawan	
Yemen	Hadramawt	Wasit Oasis	101	Erg		
Yemen	Hadramawt	Yuwan Oasis	801	Wadi	Wadi Yuwan	
Yemen	Al Mahrah	Bmzon Oasis	216	Wadi	Wadi Al Masilah	
Yemen	Al Mahrah	Dha Sohis Oasis	270	Wadi	Wadi Al Masilah	
Yemen	Al Mahrah	Qishn Oasis	6	Depression		
Yemen	Al Jawf	Al Hazm Oasis	1109	Wadi	Wadi Madab	
Yemen	Al Jawf	Dasl Oasis	1303	Wadi	Wadi Khab	
Yemen	Al Jawf	Khab Oasis	1402	Wadi	Wadi Khab	
Yemen	Al Jawf	Suq Al Thaluth Oasis	1450	Wadi	Wadi Khab	
Yemen	Al Hudaydah	Nukhaylah Oasis	8	Depression		
Yemen	Al Hudaydah	Al Rus Oasis	25	Depression		
Yemen	Al Hudaydah	Az Za'faran Oasis	15	Depression		
Yemen	Ta'izz	Yakhtul Oasis	6	Depression		

=== New World dryland systems with oasis-like attributes ===
- Huacachina, Peru
- Quitobaquito, Organ Pipe Cactus National Monument, Arizona
- Kitowok, Sonora, Mexico
- Fish Springs National Wildlife Refuge in Utah, United States
- Havasu Falls, Grand Canyon, Arizona
- Zzyzx in Mojave National Preserve, California
- Cuatro Ciénegas, Chihuahuan Desert, Mexico
- Oasis Spring Ecological Reserve, Salton Sea, California

== Gallery of oases ==
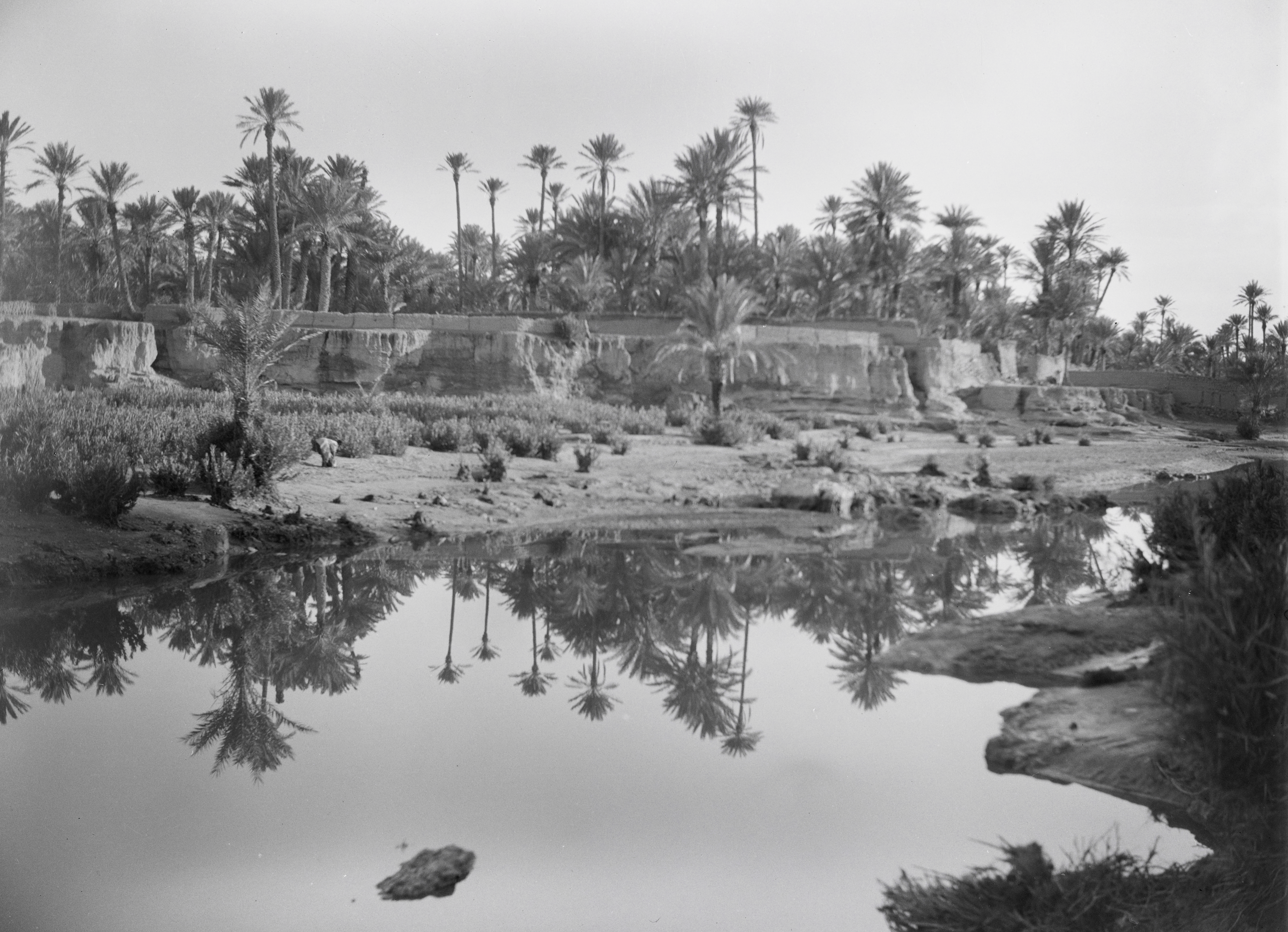
Unidentified oasis in Chad, photographed c. 1930

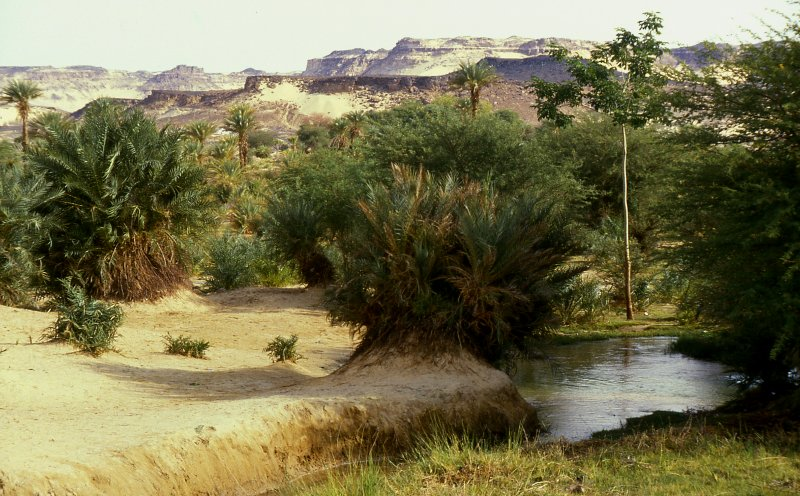
Bilma Oasis, Niger

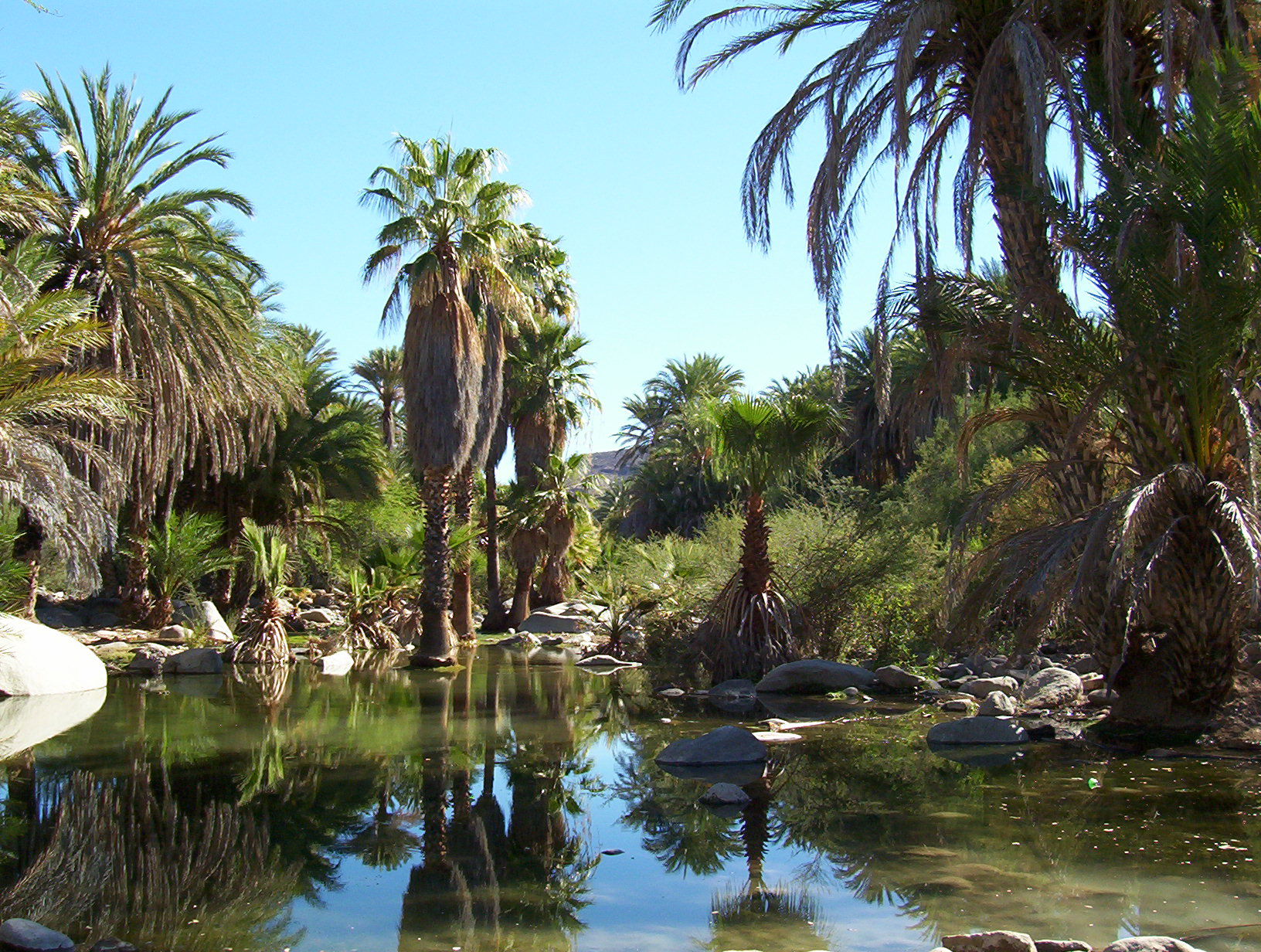
Oasis de Santa Gertrudis, Baja California

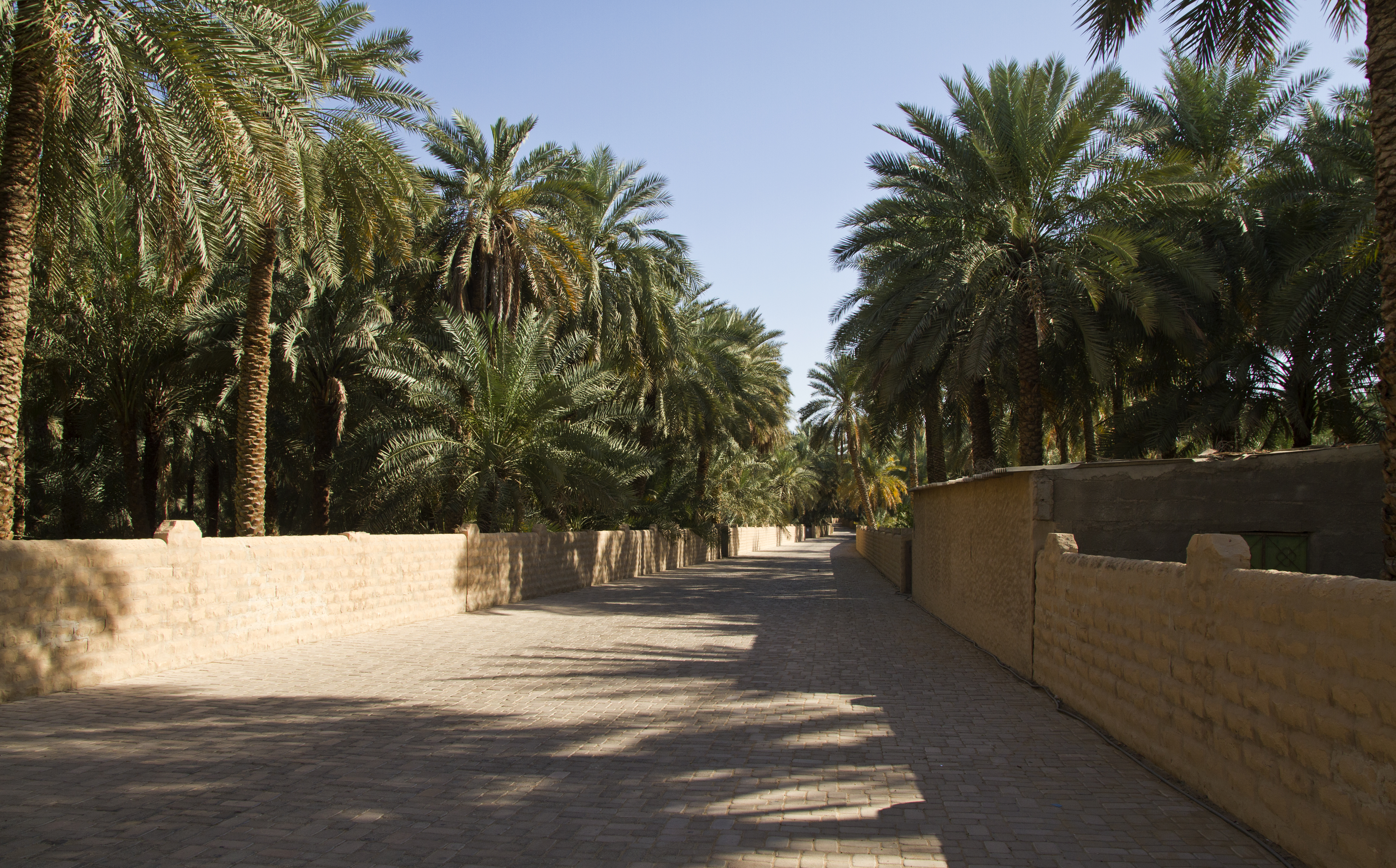
Al Ain Oasis in the city of Al Ain in the United Arab Emirates

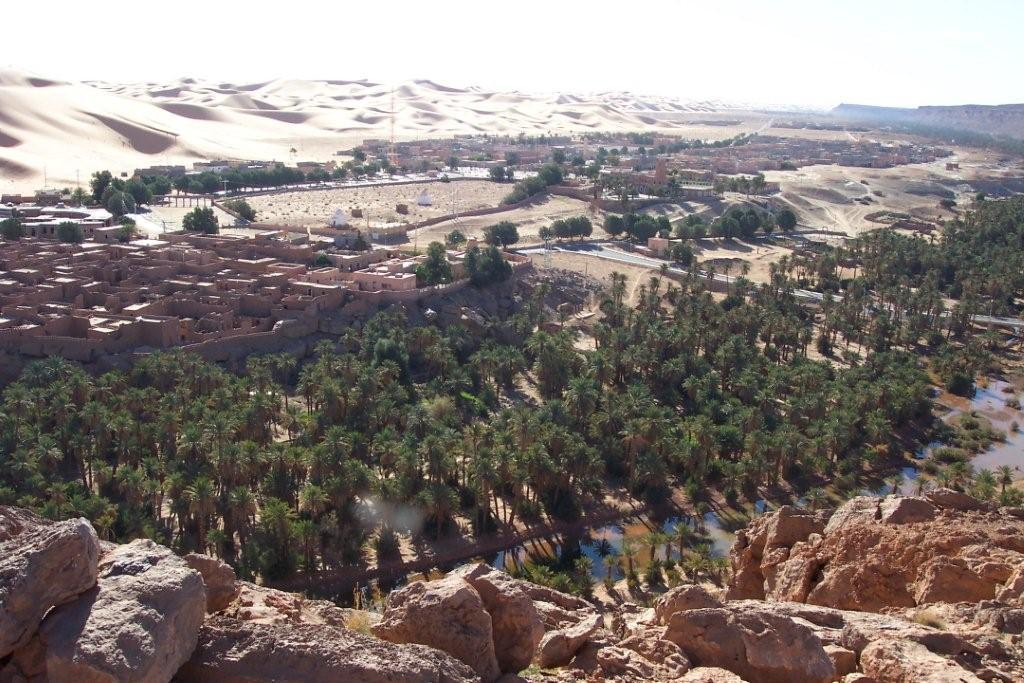
Taghit in Algeria, North Africa

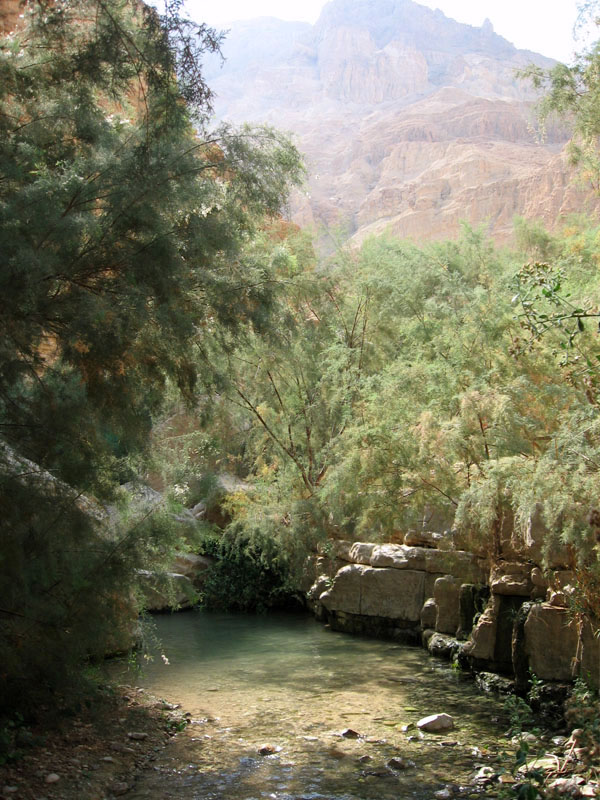
Ein Gedi in Israel, West Asia

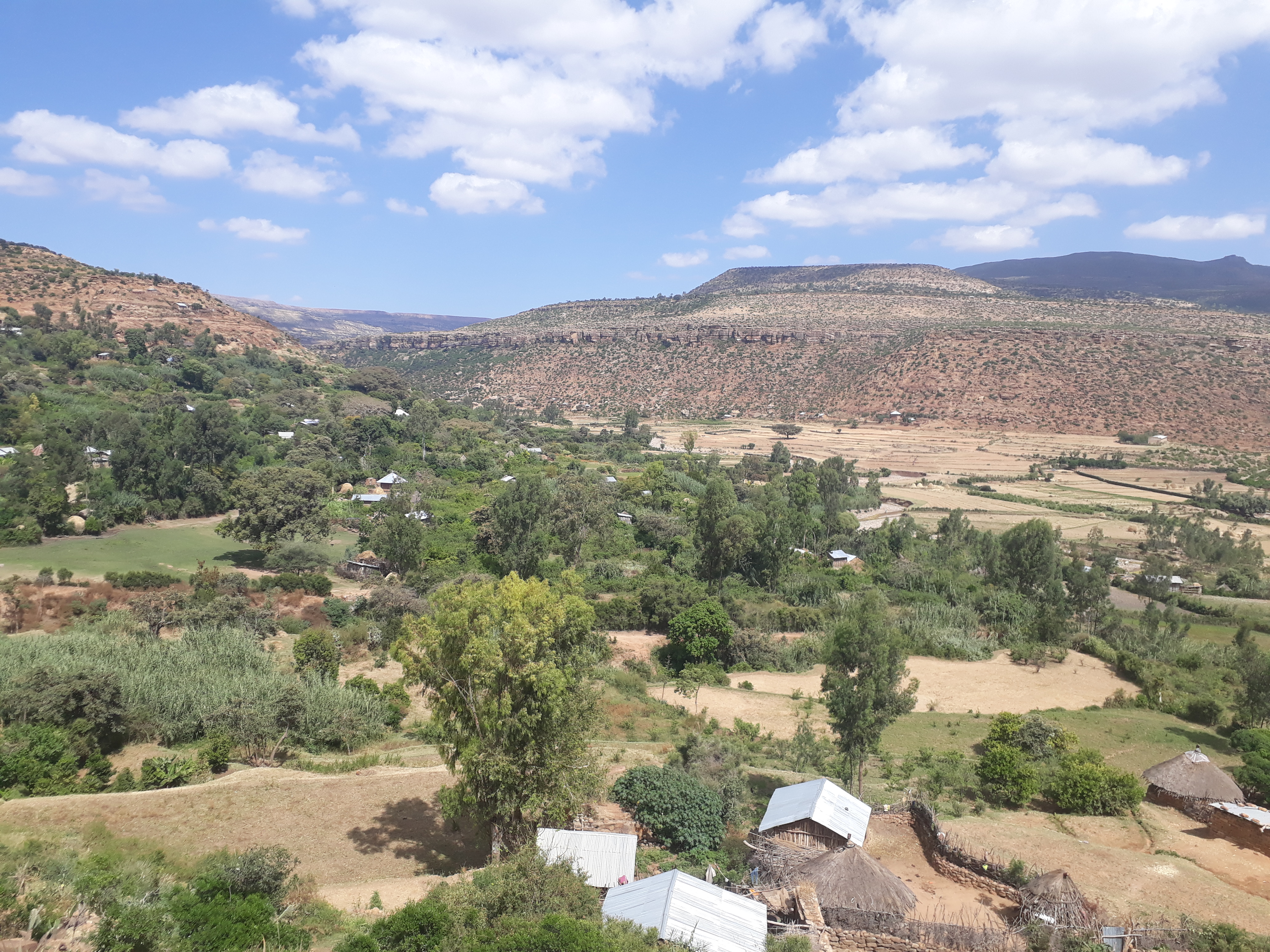
Rubaksa in a dry limestone environment in north Ethiopia is an oasis thanks to the existence of karstic springs.

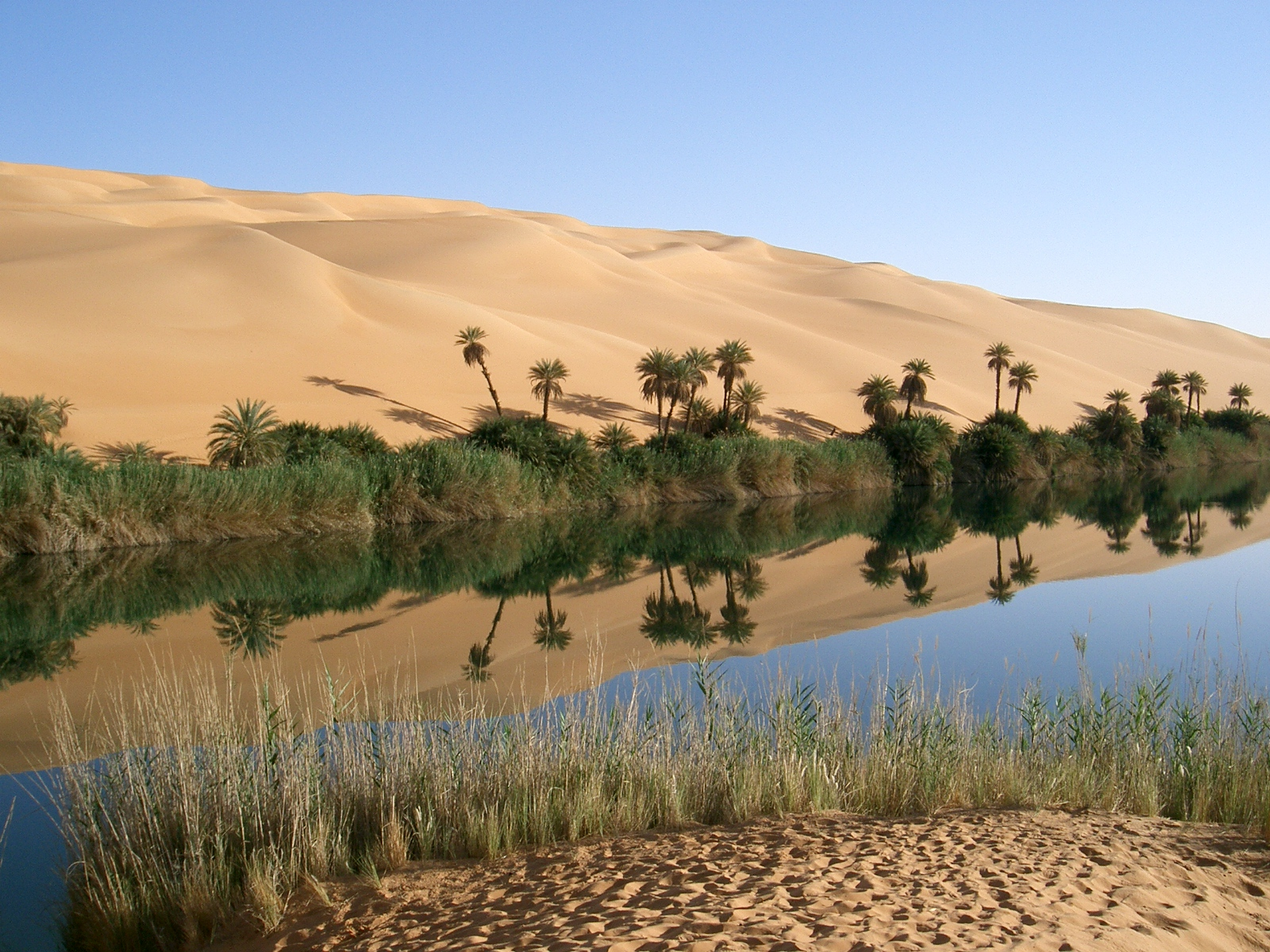
Ubari Oasis in southwestern Libya

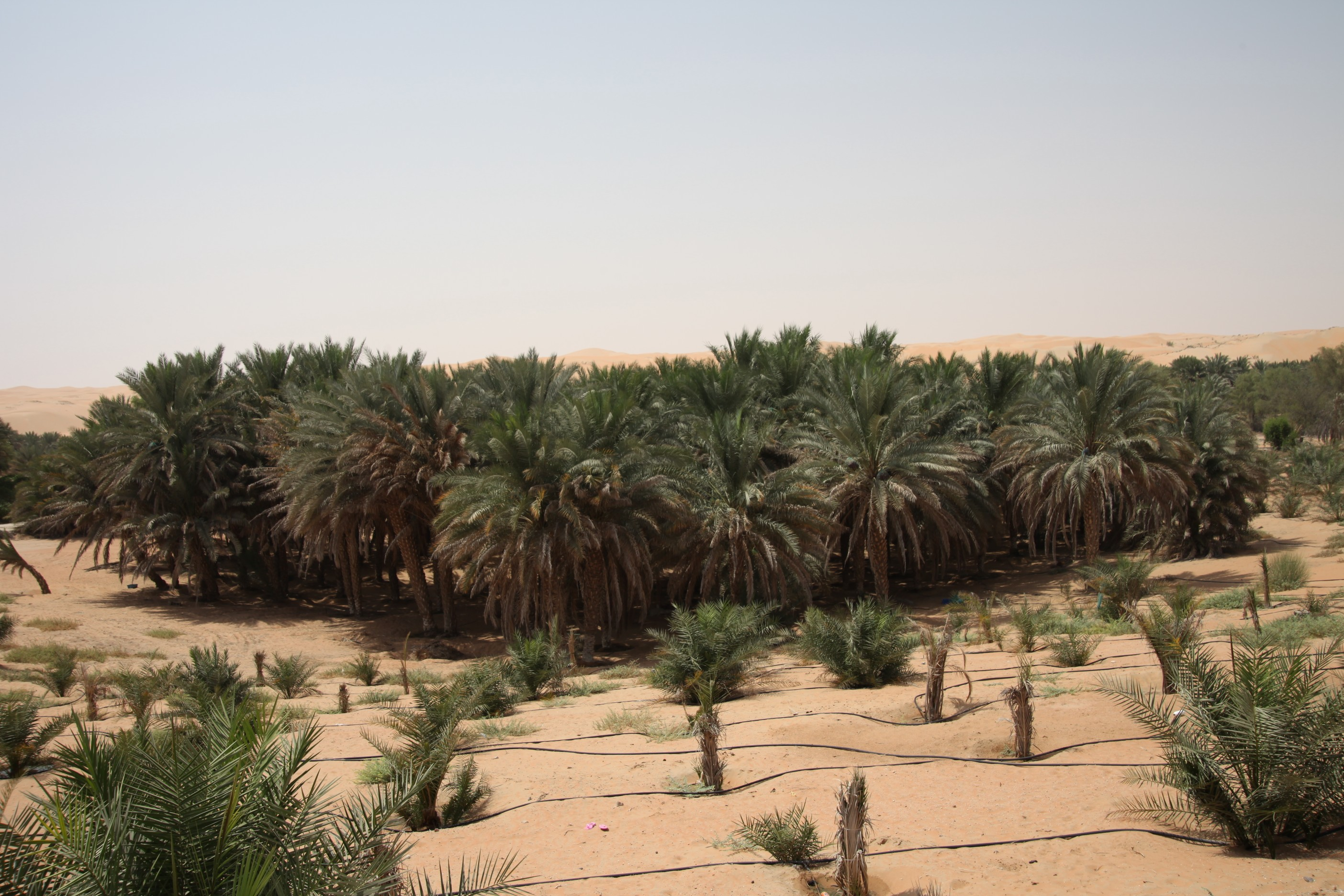
Date palm trees in Liwa Oasis

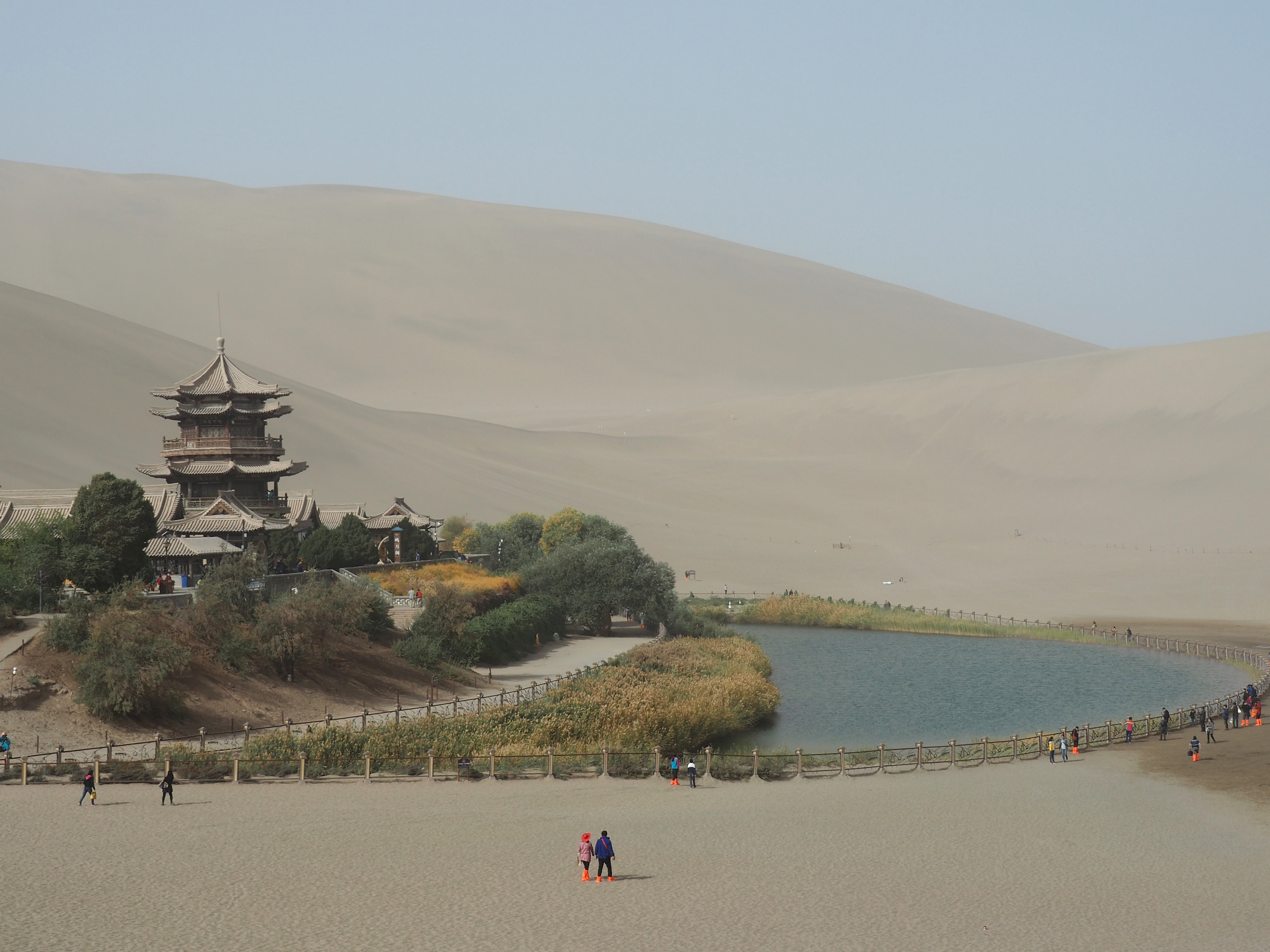
Crescent Lake (Yueyaquan) in the Gobi Desert

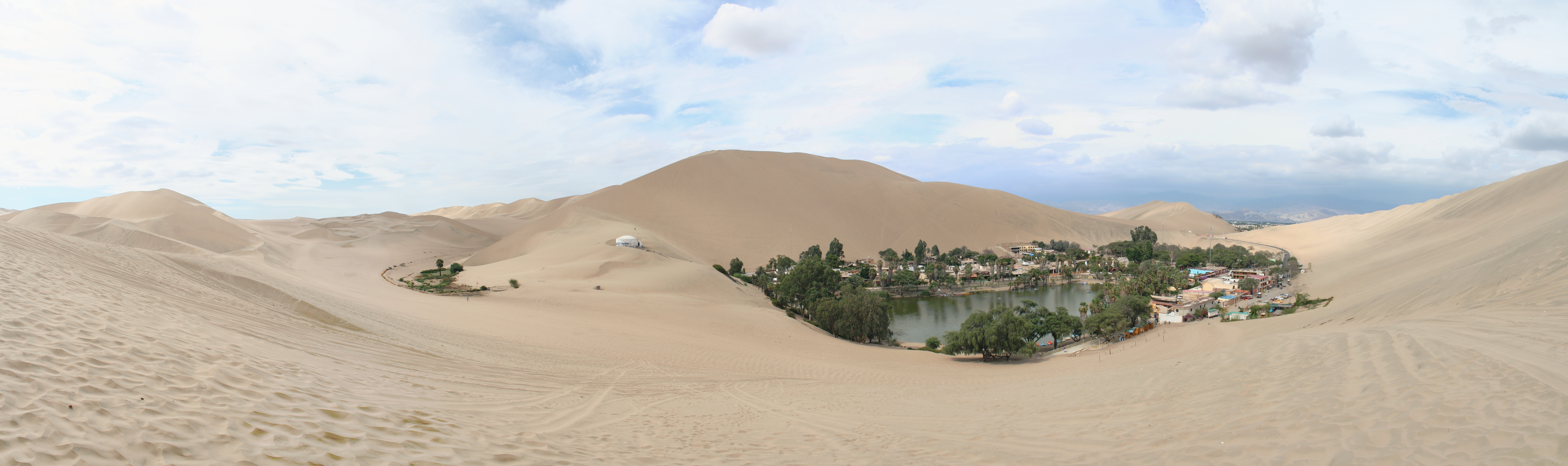
Huacachina in southwestern Peru

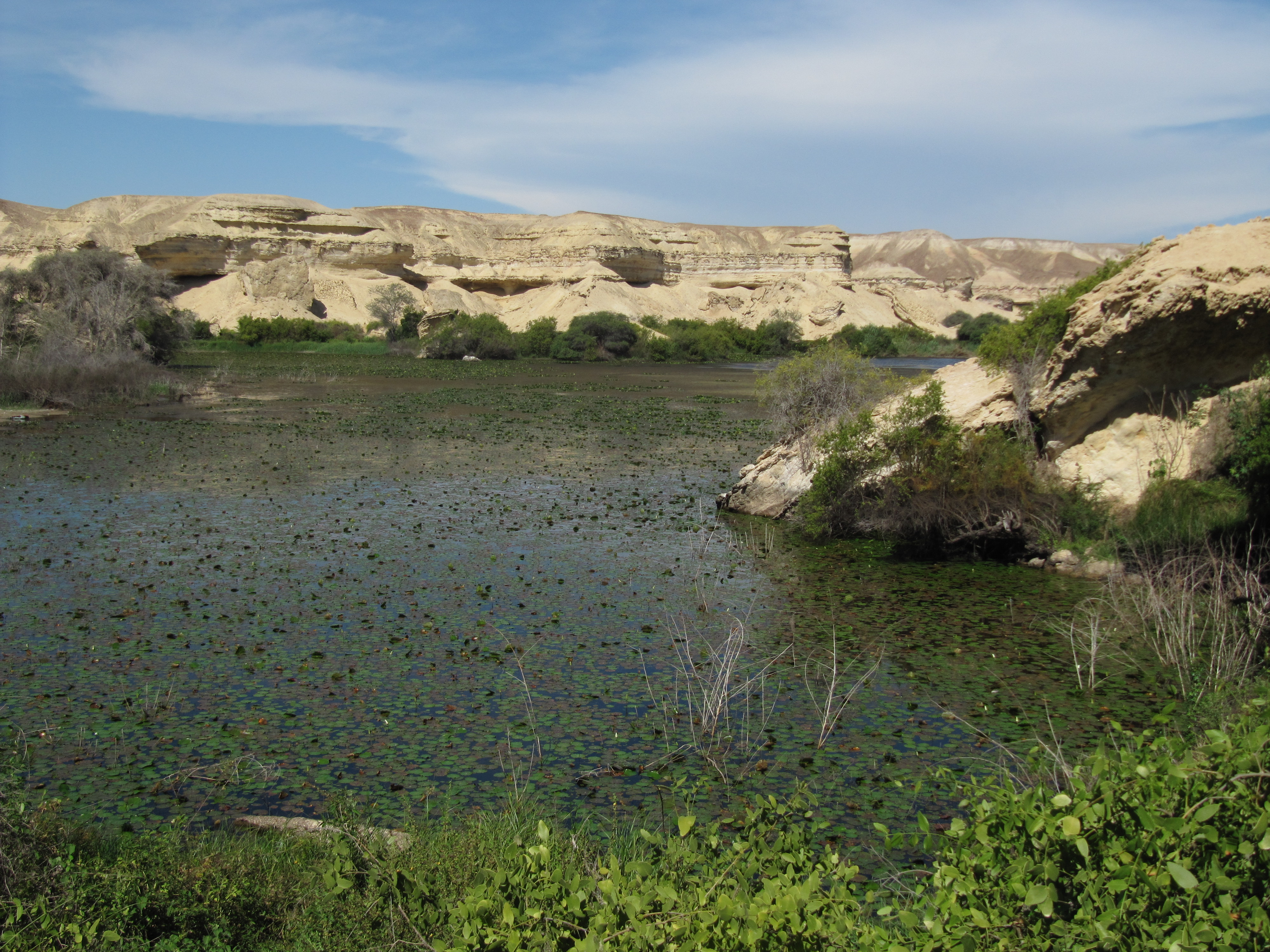
Namib desert oasis, Angola

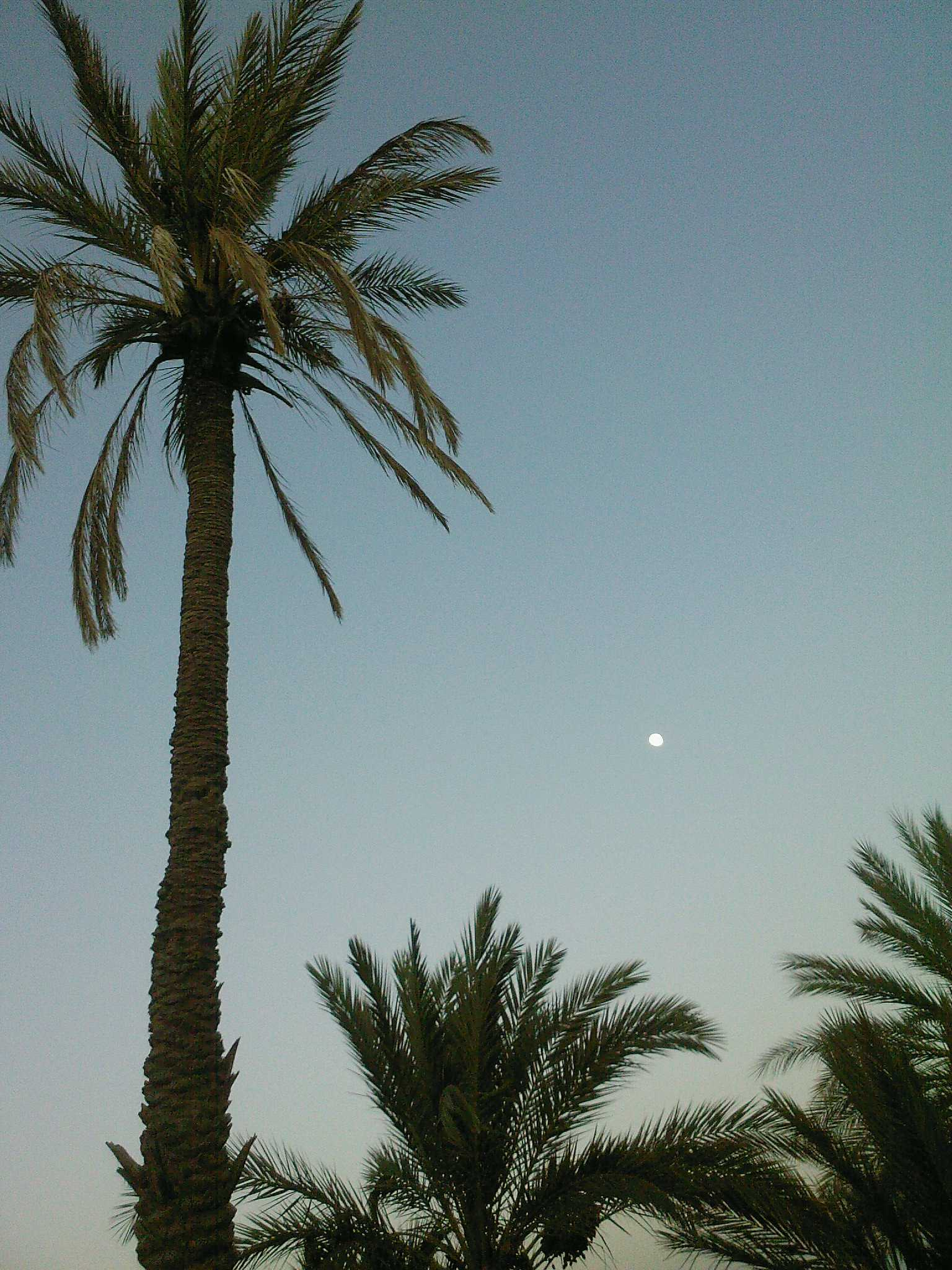
Palm trees and the moon in Figuig, Morocco

== Practical matters ==
A 1920 USGS publication about watering holes in the deserts of California and Arizona gave this advice for travelers seeking oases:

The usual watering places are springs or wells. Springs are frequently clogged with gravel or rubbish or sometimes even with the bodies of dead animals, and it may be necessary to clean them out. For this work a shovel is needed. Wells may or may not be equipped with pumps. Frequently the pumps are broken and useless, and a rope and bucket are then necessary to obtain water. Most of the wells in this region are less than 100 feet deep, but some are deeper, and 100 feet of rope is not too much to provide. As a rule the rope and bucket at a well, if they were ever provided, soon disappear, and one should never trust the chance of finding them there. Open wells are sometimes contaminated in the same way as springs and need to be cleaned out, particularly in little-frequented places where they are unused for months at a time.

== See also ==
- Great Man-Made River – Pipes supplying water to northern Libya – the world's largest irrigation project; developed in Libya to connect cities with fossil water.
- Guelta – Pockets of water in the Sahara and Arabian deserts
- Mirage – Optical illusion caused by bending of light
- Oasification – Antonym to desertification by soil erosion
- Qanat – Water supply system developed in ancient Iran
- Puquios – Underground aqueducts in Peru and Chile
- Wadi – Hydrological feature
- Water supply – Provision of water by public utilities, commercial organisations or others
- Grove (nature) – Small group of trees
- Gallery forest – Type of riparian forest in dry regions
- Lençóis Maranhenses National Park (Brazil)
- Great Green Wall (disambiguation)
- Aflaj Irrigation Systems of Oman
- Palmeral of Elche
- Fog oasis (South America)

== Bibliography ==
- Battesti, Vincent (2005). Jardins au désert, Évolution des pratiques et savoirs oasiens, Jérid tunisien. Paris: IRD Éditions. p. 440. ISBN 978-2-7099-1564-9.
