= Righ =

Righ may be:

- Gaelic for "king", see Rí
- Oued Righ
