= Oasis effect =

Alteration of a surrounding environment by the presence of a water source

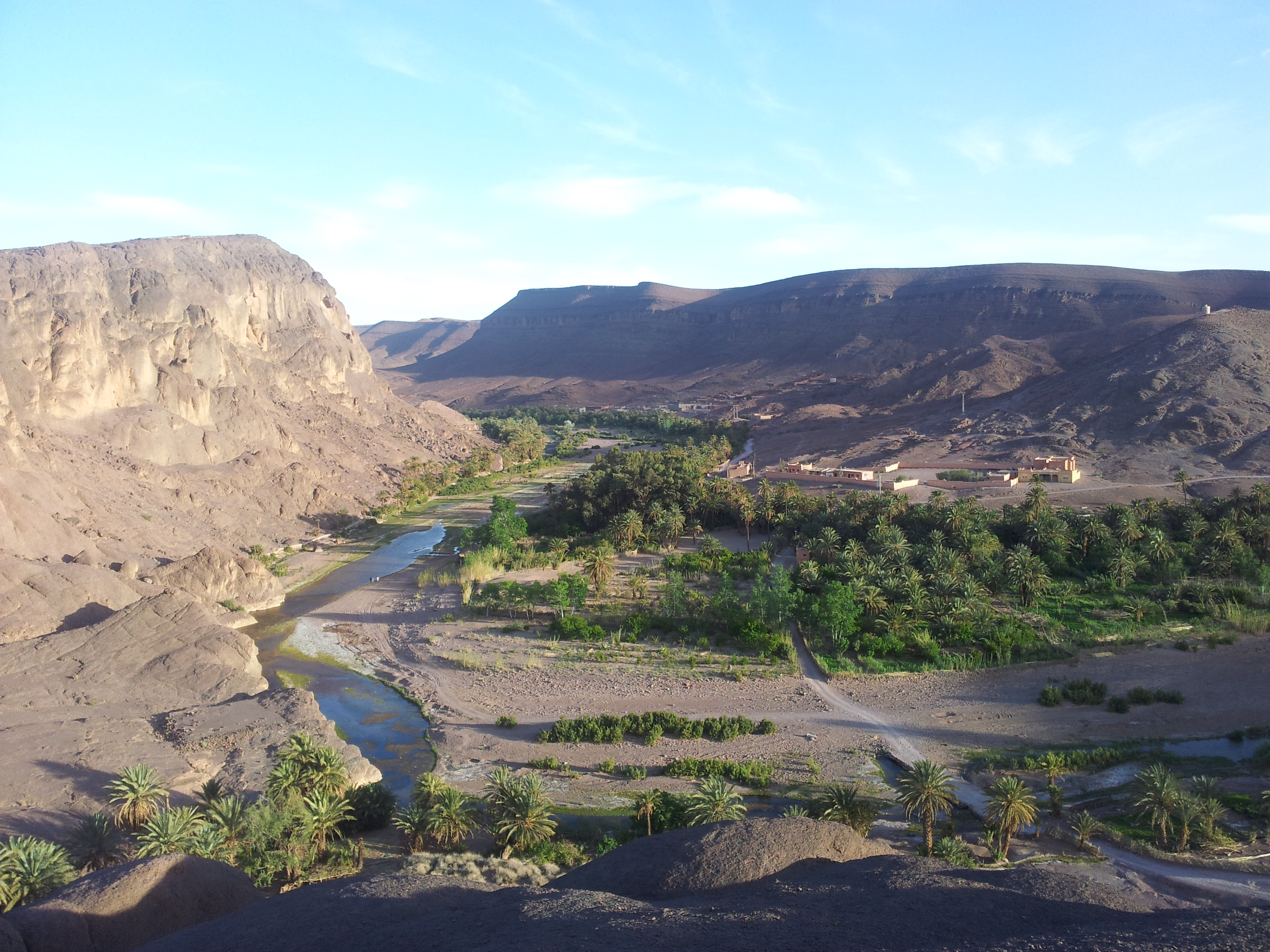
This photo shows the sharp contrast between the oasis and the surrounding desert created by the oasis effect.

The oasis effect refers to the creation of a local microclimate that is cooler than the surrounding dry area due to evaporation or evapotranspiration of a water source or plant life and higher albedo of plant life than bare ground. The oasis effect is so-named because it occurs in desert oases. Urban planners can design a city's layout to optimize the oasis effect to combat the urban heat island effect. Since it depends on evaporation, the oasis effect differs by season.

== Causes ==
An oasis contains moisture from a water source and/or plants. When that water evaporates or transpirates, heat from the surroundings is used to convert liquid to gas in an endothermic process, which results in cooler local temperatures. Moreover, vegetation has a higher albedo than bare ground, and reflects more sunlight, leading to lower land temperatures, lower air temperatures, and a cooler local microclimate.

== Seasonal effects ==
The oasis effect occurs most prominently during the summer because warmer temperatures lead to more evaporation. In the winter, the oasis effect operates differently. Instead of making the oasis cooler, the oasis effect makes it warmer at night. This occurs through the fact that trees block heat from leaving the land. Basically, radiation cannot be emitted back into the atmosphere because the trees intercept and absorb it.

== Urban planning ==
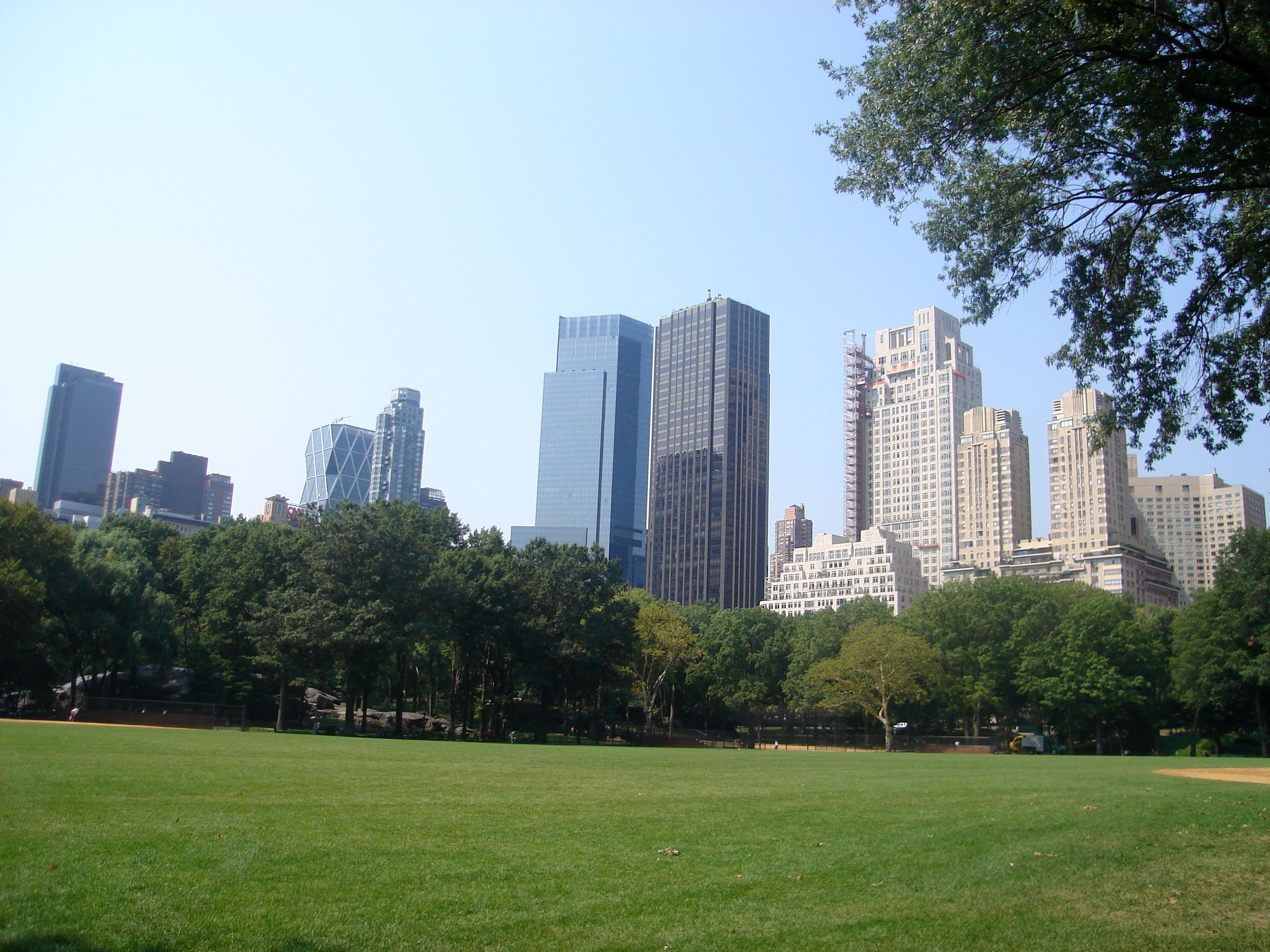
Parks like Central Park in New York City help create an oasis effect in urban areas.

The oasis effect plays a role in urban development because plants and bodies of water result in cooler cities. Accordingly, cities with parks will have lower temperatures because plants have higher albedo than bare ground or roads. Areas with higher albedo reflect more light than they absorb, leading to cooler temperatures. Normally, cities are hotter than their suburbs due to dense population, dark buildings and roads, and pollution; this is known as the urban heat island effect. However, by careful placement of trees, parks, and plant life, cities can create their own oasis effect. By maintaining plant life throughout a city, urban planners can produce an oasis effect to counter the urban heat island effect; even a small scattering of trees can significantly reduce local temperatures. However, concerns can arise in arid regions with limited water sources where city planners may not want to leave water sources out in the open to evaporate, and may not want to sacrifice water for upkeep of plants.

== See also ==
- Urban climate
- Water-sensitive urban design
- Green roof
- Oasis
- Evaporative Cooling
