= Oued Righ =

Geographic Area in Algeria

The Oued Righ (also spelled Oued Rir', Oued Rirh, Wadi Righ) is a region of the northeastern Algerian Sahara. It includes a number of oases, the principal centre being Touggourt. Some of these oases speak Oued Righ Berber.

Groundwater is used for irrigation in the region.
