= Akabli =

Akabli أﻗﺒﻠﻰ
- Town and commune
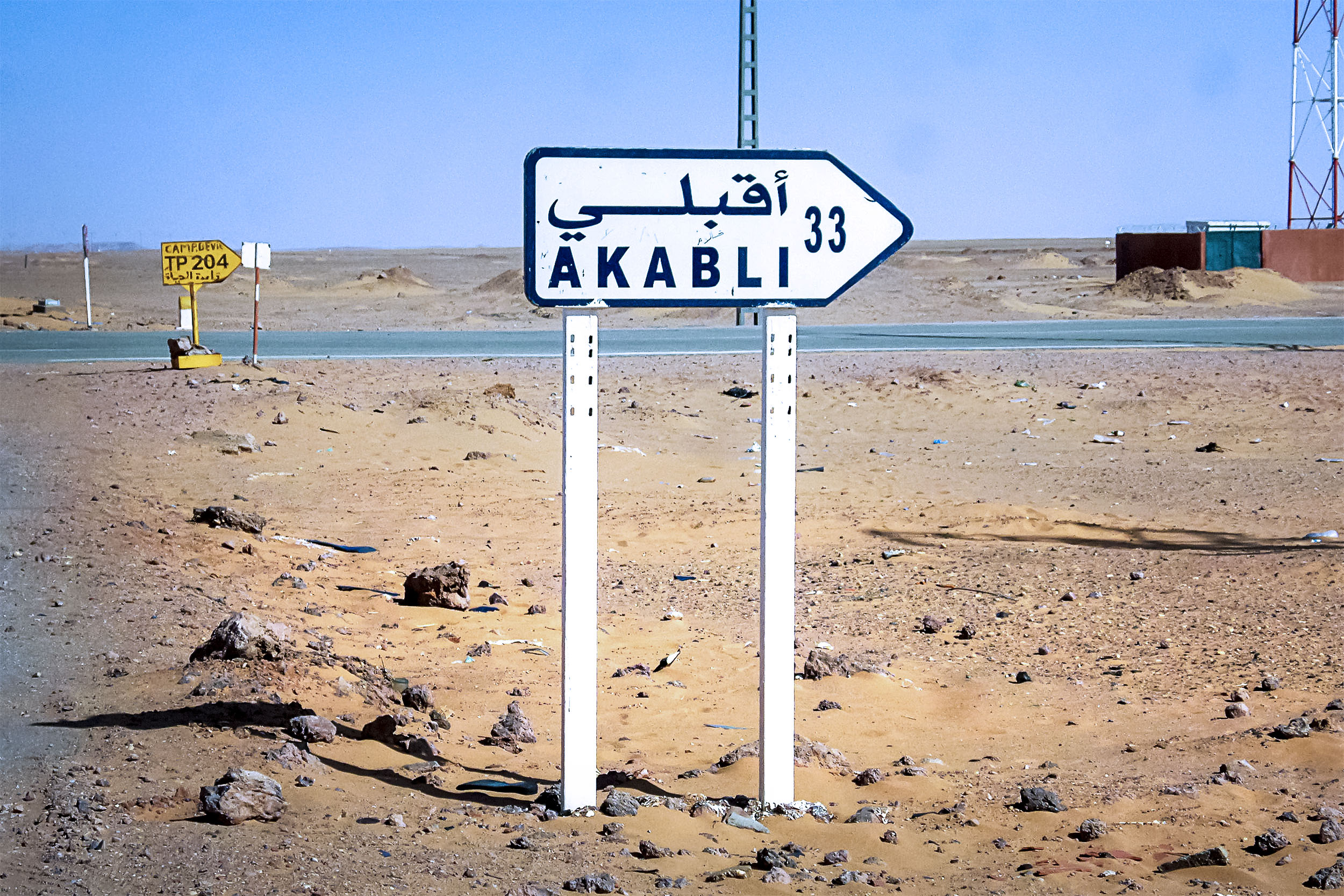

- Location of Akabli commune within Adrar Province

- Location of Akabli in Algeria
- Coordinates: 26°42′44″N 1°22′15″E
- Country: Algeria
- Province: Adrar
- District: Aoulef
- Elevation: 226 m (741 ft)

Population (2008)
  - Total: 10,171
- Time zone: UTC+1 (CET)

Akabli (Arabic: أﻗﺒﻠﻰ) is a town and commune in Aoulef District, Adrar Province, in south-central Algeria. According to the 2008 census it has a population of 10,171, up from 7,513 in 1998, with an annual growth rate of 3.1%.

== Geography ==
The town of Akabli is made up of three distinct parts, lying at an elevation of 226 metres (741 ft) about a set of oases. Akabli is a part of the Tidikelt region of the central Sahara that extends from central eastern Adrar Province (where Akabli is located) to northeast Tamanrasset Province around In Salah. The oases in this region are sparser than in the Tuat and Gourara regions, in which most of the population of Adrar Province live, but there are still a number of towns such as Aoulef, Timokten, Tit and In Ghar. The nearby land is mostly flat; however, much further north the land rises to the Tademaït plateau, while to the south there are extensive salt pans at elevations of 120–130 metres (390–430 ft).

== Climate ==
Akabli has a hot desert climate (Köppen climate classification BWh), with extremely hot summers and mild winters, and very little precipitation throughout the year.

Climate data for Akabli
| Month | Jan | Feb | Mar | Apr | May | Jun | Jul | Aug | Sep | Oct | Nov | Dec | Year |
|---|---|---|---|---|---|---|---|---|---|---|---|---|---|
| Mean daily maximum °C (°F) | 21.6 (70.9) | 25.1 (77.2) | 29.4 (84.9) | 33.7 (92.7) | 38.2 (100.8) | 43.8 (110.8) | 45.4 (113.7) | 44.1 (111.4) | 41.2 (106.2) | 34.9 (94.8) | 28.1 (82.6) | 22.8 (73.0) | 34.0 (93.3) |
| Daily mean °C (°F) | 14.3 (57.7) | 17.5 (63.5) | 21.3 (70.3) | 25.7 (78.3) | 30.3 (86.5) | 35.8 (96.4) | 37.5 (99.5) | 36.6 (97.9) | 33.8 (92.8) | 27.5 (81.5) | 20.7 (69.3) | 15.4 (59.7) | 26.4 (79.5) |
| Mean daily minimum °C (°F) | 7.1 (44.8) | 9.9 (49.8) | 13.3 (55.9) | 17.7 (63.9) | 22.5 (72.5) | 27.8 (82.0) | 29.7 (85.5) | 29.2 (84.6) | 26.4 (79.5) | 20.1 (68.2) | 13.3 (55.9) | 8.1 (46.6) | 18.8 (65.8) |
| Average precipitation mm (inches) | 2 (0.1) | 0 (0) | 1 (0.0) | 0 (0) | 0 (0) | 0 (0) | 0 (0) | 1 (0.0) | 1 (0.0) | 1 (0.0) | 2 (0.1) | 2 (0.1) | 10 (0.3) |
Source: climate-data.org

== Transportation ==
Akabli is quite isolated, and the only road out of the town leads directly to the N52 highway 35 kilometres (22 mi) to the north. From the intersection, the N52 connects to Reggane and Adrar to the west and In Ghar and In Salah to the east.

== Education ==
7.5% of the population has a tertiary education, and another 14.5% has completed secondary education. The overall literacy rate is 73.3% (second highest in the province), and is 83.2% among males (second highest in the province) and 63.4% among females.

== Localities ==
As of 1984, the commune was composed of four localities:

- Erg Chech
- Sahel
- Zaouïa El Mansour
- Hanet
