= Timokten =

Timokten ﺗﻤﻘﺘﻦ
- Town and commune
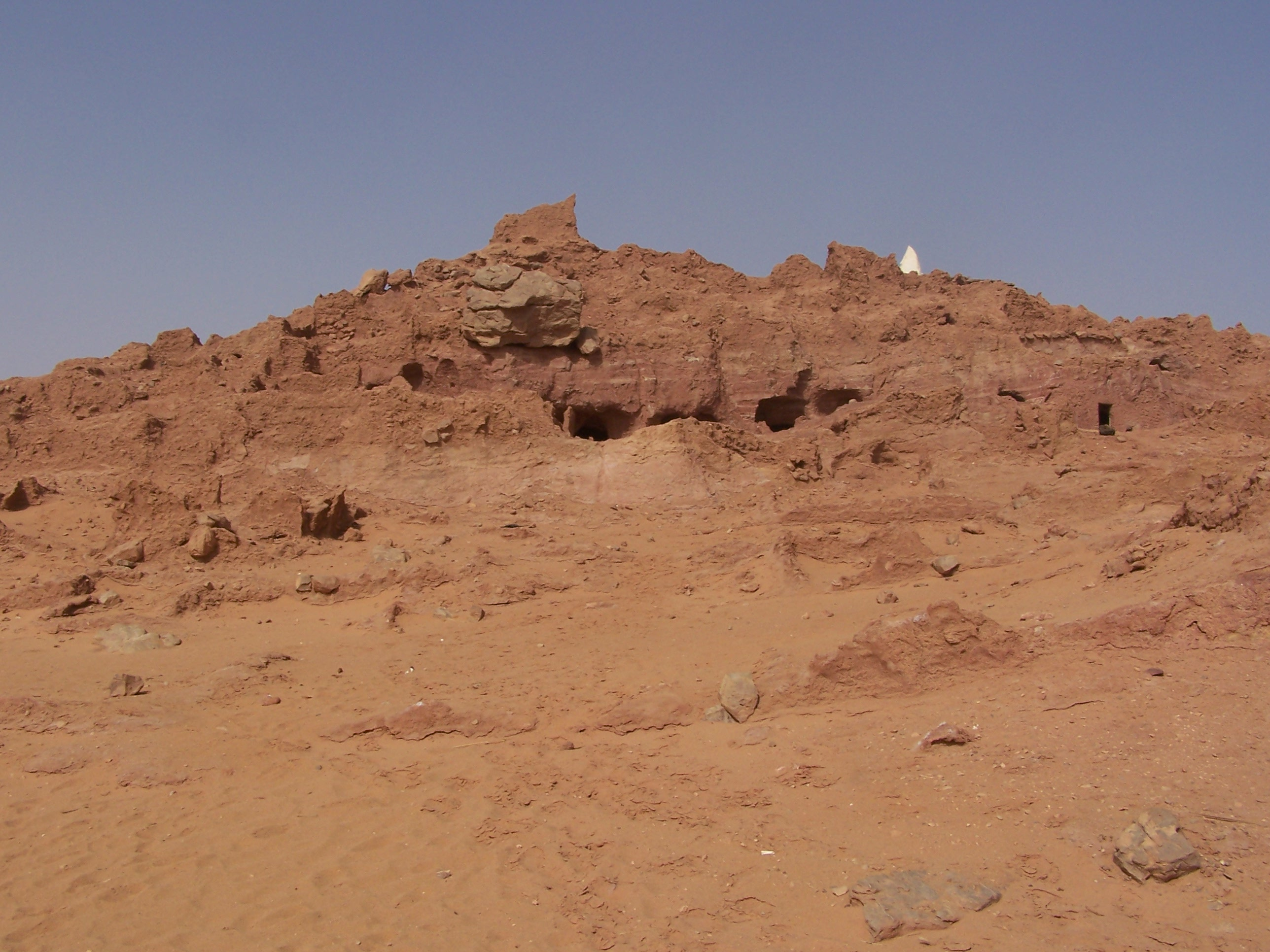
- The caves of Echaref in Timokten

- Location of Timokten commune within Adrar Province

- Location of Timokten in Algeria
- Coordinates: 27°1′18″N 1°0′54″E
- Country: Algeria
- Province: Adrar
- District: Aoulef
- Elevation: 288 m (945 ft)

Population (2008)
  - Total: 18,598
- Time zone: UTC+1 (CET)

Timokten (Arabic: ﺗﻤﻘﺘﻦ) (also spelled Timoktene, Timekten, or Tamekten) is a town and commune in Aoulef District, Adrar Province, in south-central Algeria. According to the 2008 census it has a population of 18,598, up from 14,134 in 1998, with an annual growth rate of 2.8%.

== Geography ==
The town of Timokten lies at an elevation of 288 metres (945 ft) on the western side of an oasis. Other settlements, such as Zaouiet Moulay Heïba, lie around the northern and eastern sides of this oasis. is a part of the Tidikelt region of the central Sahara that extends from central eastern Adrar Province (where Aoulef is located) to northeast Tamanrasset Province around In Salah. The oases in this region are sparser than in the Tuat and Gourara regions in which most of the population of Adrar Province live, but there are still a number of towns such as Aoulef, Akabli, Tit and In Ghar. The nearby land is mostly flat aside from some small hills to the east; however further north the land rises to the Tademaït plateau.

== Climate ==
Timokten has a hot desert climate (Köppen climate classification BWh), with extremely hot summers and mild winters, and very little precipitation throughout the year.

== Transportation ==
A provincial road connects Timokten to the district capital of Aoulef, which lies 9 kilometres (5.6 mi) to the southeast on the N52 national highway, connecting it to Reggane and eventually Adrar to the west and In Salah to the east. The same provincial road also leads northwest to Adrar, 160 kilometres (99 mi) to the northwest.

== Education ==
7.8% of the population has a tertiary education, and another 17.1% has completed secondary education. The overall literacy rate is 79.4%, and is 90.7% among males and 67.2% among females.

== Localities ==
As of 1984, the commune was composed of 11 localities:

- Iner
- Zaouiet Moulay Heïba
- Kasbet Sied
- Kasbet Djena
- Bled El Mehdi El Mansour
- Ouled Moulay Rachid
- Ezzouïa
- El Merguieb
- Gaougaou
- Aoulef El Kébir
- Akhannous
- Ouled El Hadj
- Bled Lahssiène
- Aïn Belbal
- Matriouan Timokten
