= Sali, Algeria =

Sali ﺳﺎﻟﻰ
- Town and Commune
- Location of Sali commune within Adrar Province

- Location of Sali within Algeria
- Coordinates: 25°57′38″N 0°1′39″W
- Country: Algeria
- Province: Adrar
- District: Reggane
- Elevation: 220 m (720 ft)

Population (2008)
  - Total: 13,138
- Time zone: UTC+1 (CET)

Sali (Arabic: ﺳﺎﻟﻰ) is a town and commune in Reggane District, Adrar Province, south-central Algeria. According to the 2008 census it has a population of 13,138, up from 11,304 in 1998, with an annual growth rate of 1.5%.

== Geography ==
The villages in Sali commune are all found next to oases at an elevation of about 220 metres (720 ft). These oases form part of a long longer string of oases known as the Tuat region, running from north to south through Adrar Province. Beyond the oases, the sandy Erg Chech desert lies to the west and the rocky Tademaït plateau lies to the east.

== Climate ==
Sali has a hot desert climate (Köppen climate classification BWh), with extremely hot summers and mild winters, and very little precipitation throughout the year.

== Transportation ==
The main road in Sali commune is the N6 national highway, which runs through the commune from north-northwest to south-southeast, and connects to Adrar in the north and Reggane in the south. The villages of the commune are connected to the highway by short local roads.

== Education ==
5.1% of the population has a tertiary education, and another 12.7% has completed secondary education. The overall literacy rate is 74.1%, and is 88.0% among males and 60.3% among females.

== Localities ==
As of 1984, the commune was composed of 17 localities:

- Bab Allah
- El Mansour
- Bermata
- Kasbet Moulay Ali
- Kasbet Ennadjar
- El Meharza
- Kasbet Djenna Allouchia
- Kasbet Sidi Cherif
- Oulay Moulay Abdelouahab
- Ksar Eldjdid
- Kasbet Bassidi
- Ouled Moulay El Arbi
- Tinnourt
- Berriche
- Bahou
- El Mestour
- Zaouit Lahchef
