= Tamest =

Tamest ﺗﺄﻣﺎﺳﺖ
- Commune
- Location of Tamest commune within Adrar Province

- Location of Tamest within Algeria
- Coordinates: 27°25′N 0°14′W
- Country: Algeria
- Province: Adrar
- District: Fenoughil
- Elevation: 240 m (790 ft)

Population (2008)
  - Total: 8,266
- Time zone: UTC+1 (CET)

Tamest (Arabic: تامست) is a commune in Fenoughil District, Adrar Province, south-central Algeria. According to the 2008 census it has a population of 8,266, up from 6,658 in 1998, with an annual growth rate of 2.2%.

== Geography ==
The villages in Tamest commune are all found next to oases at an elevation of about 240 metres (790 ft). These oases form part of a long longer string of oases known as the Tuat region, running from north to south through Adrar Province. Beyond the oases, the sandy Erg Chech desert lies to the west and the rocky Tademaït plateau lies to the east.

== Climate ==
Tamest has a hot desert climate (Köppen climate classification BWh), with extremely hot summers and mild winters, and very little precipitation throughout the year.

== Transportation ==
The main road in Tamest commune is the N6 national highway, which runs through the commune from north to south, and connects to Adrar in the north and Reggane in the south. Some local villages lie on the side of the highway while others are connected by short local roads.

== Education ==
5.5% of the population has a tertiary education, and another 12.8% has completed secondary education. The overall literacy rate is 75.3%, and is 85.6% among males and 65.1% among females.

== Localities ==
As of 1984, the commune was composed of 11 localities:

- El Ahmar
- Titaf
- Rharmianou
- Arhil
- Temassekht
- Ikkas
- Ramalt
- Ouled Antar
- Djedid
- Ouled Bou Yahia
- Essoufia
