= Ouled Ahmed Timmi =

Ouled Ahmed Timmi أوﻻد أﺣﻤﺪ ﺗﻴﻤﻰ
- Commune
- Location of Ouled Ahmed Timmi commune within Adrar Province

- Location of Ouled Ahmed Timmi within Algeria
- Coordinates: 27°49′N 0°20′W
- Country: Algeria
- Province: Adrar
- District: Adrar
- Elevation: 229 m (751 ft)

Population (2008)
  - Total: 13,547
- Time zone: UTC+1 (CET)

Ouled Ahmed Timmi (Arabic: أوﻻد أﺣﻤﺪ ﺗﻴﻤﻰ) is a commune in Adrar District, Adrar Province, in south-central Algeria. According to the 2008 census it has a population of 13,547, up from 11,976 in 1998, with an annual growth rate of 1.3%.

== Geography ==
The commune covers a series of populated oases in the northern part of the Tuat region to the immediate west and south of Adrar. The elevation of the area is around 229 metres (751 ft). It also covers a strip of land stretching about 200 kilometres (120 mi) to the western border of the province; this area covers the almost uninhabited Erg Chech desert.

== Climate ==
Ouled Ahmed Timmi has a hot desert climate (Köppen climate classification BWh), with extremely hot summers and mild winters, and very little precipitation throughout the year.

== Transportation ==
The villages of the commune to the northwest (such as Ouinna, Melouka and Kousan) are connected to the western side of Adrar city by provincial roads, and to the villages in Bouda commune further north. The villages to the southeast (such as Ouled Brahim, Mahidia and Zaouia Sidi Bekri) are connected to the N6 national highway on its way south from Adrar.

== Education ==
5.1% of the population has a tertiary education, and another 15.9% has completed secondary education. The overall literacy rate is 75.7%, and is 85.4% among males and 65.9% among females.

== Localities ==
As of 1984, the commune was composed of 15 localities:

- Ouled Brahim
- Taridalt
- Ouled Ahmed
- Beni Tamer
- El Mansourria
- Ouled Bouhefs
- Mahidia
- Zaouia Sidi Bekri
- Kousam
- Bouzane
- Ouled Aïssa
- Ouled Aroussa
- Melouka
- Mimoune
- Ouinna
