= Aoulef =

Aoulef أوﻟﻒ
- Town and commune
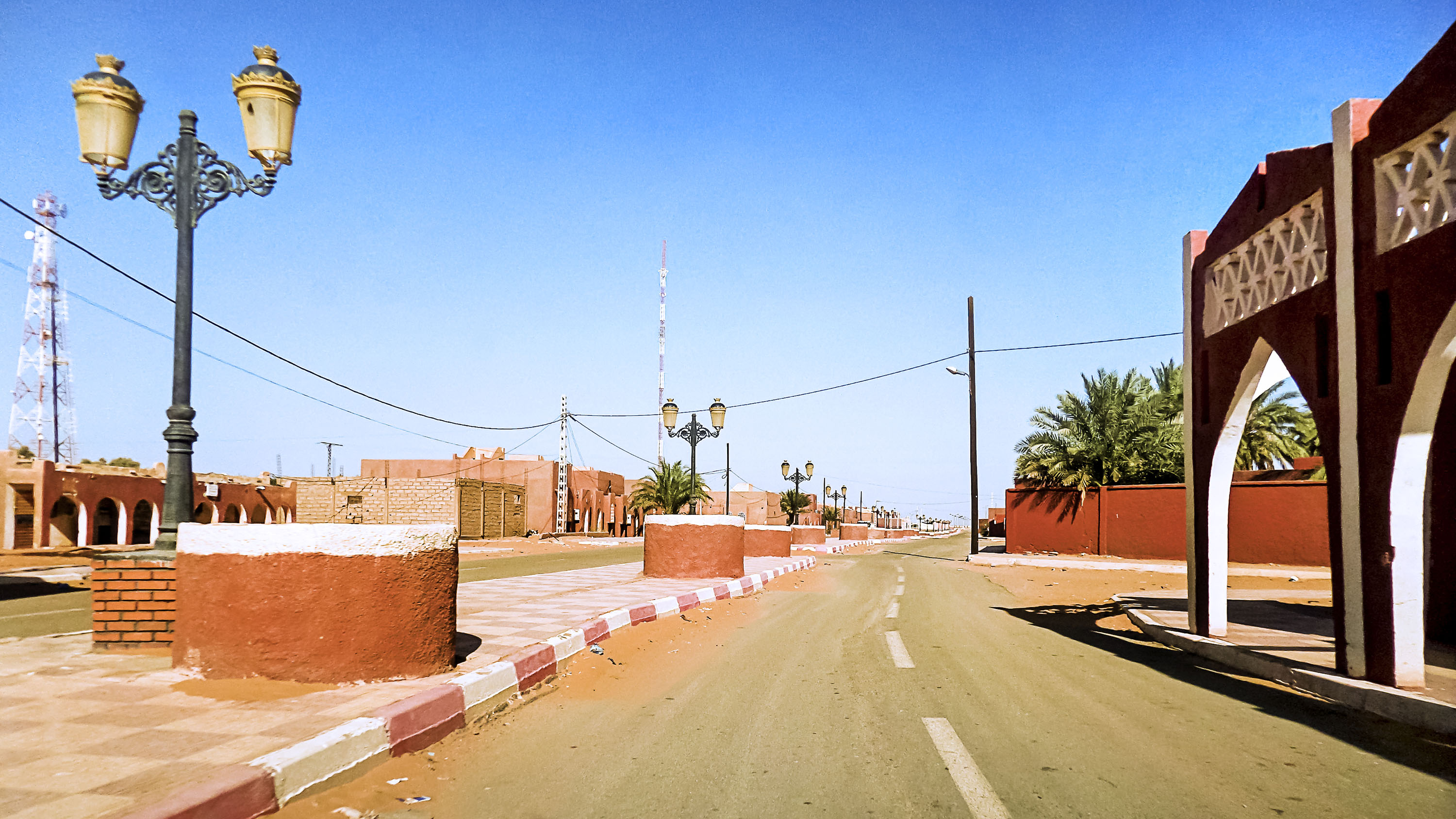
- Aoulef (2017)

- Location of Aoulef commune within Adrar Province

- Location of Aoulef in Algeria
- Coordinates: 26°58′25″N 1°4′52″E
- Country: Algeria
- Province: Adrar
- District: Aoulef
- Elevation: 288 m (945 ft)

Population (2008)
  - Total: 21,723
- Time zone: UTC+1 (CET)

Aoulef (Arabic: أولف, romanized: Awlaf) is a town and commune and capital of Aoulef District, in Adrar Province, south-central Algeria. According to the 2008 census it has a population of 21,723, up from 15,229 in 1998, with an annual growth rate of 3.7%.

== Geography ==
The town of Aoulef lies at an elevation of 288 metres (945 ft) on the eastern side of an oasis. The oasis is a part of the Tidikelt region of the central Sahara that extends from central eastern Adrar Province (where Aoulef is located) to northeast Tamanrasset Province around In Salah. The oases in this region are sparser than in the Tuat and Gourara regions in which most of the population of Adrar Province live, but there are still a number of towns such as Timokten, Akabli, Tit and In Ghar. The nearby land is mostly flat aside from some small hills to the east; however further north the land rises to the Tademaït plateau.

== Climate ==
Aoulef has a hot desert climate (Köppen climate classification BWh), with long, extremely hot summers and short, very warm winters. Daytime temperatures are known to consistently approach 50 °C (122 °F) in summer and nighttime temperatures routinely remain above 30 °C (86 °F). Average annual rainfall is extremely low, with only 10 mm (0.39 in). The sky is nearly always clear throughout the year and cloudy days are extremely rare. Aoulef is often quoted as one of the hottest spots worldwide.

Climate data for Aoulef (Reggane Station)
Month	Jan	Feb	Mar	Apr	May	Jun	Jul	Aug	Sep	Oct	Nov	Dec	Year
Mean daily maximum °C (°F)	22.0 (71.6)	25.8 (78.4)	29.2 (84.6)	34.7 (94.5)	39.7 (103.5)	44.4 (111.9)	46.8 (116.2)	45.7 (114.3)	42.2 (108.0)	35.9 (96.6)	27.5 (81.5)	22.5 (72.5)	34.7 (94.5)
Daily mean °C (°F)	14.9 (58.8)	18.1 (64.6)	21.5 (70.7)	26.7 (80.1)	31.2 (88.2)	36.3 (97.3)	38.6 (101.5)	37.8 (100.0)	34.5 (94.1)	28.4 (83.1)	20.4 (68.7)	15.7 (60.3)	27.0 (80.6)
Mean daily minimum °C (°F)	7.8 (46.0)	10.3 (50.5)	13.8 (56.8)	18.7 (65.7)	22.6 (72.7)	28.1 (82.6)	30.4 (86.7)	29.9 (85.8)	26.7 (80.1)	20.9 (69.6)	13.3 (55.9)	8.9 (48.0)	19.3 (66.7)
Average precipitation mm (inches)	1.4 (0.06)	1.1 (0.04)	1.2 (0.05)	1.6 (0.06)	0.5 (0.02)	0.1 (0.00)	0.0 (0.0)	0.5 (0.02)	0.2 (0.01)	1.2 (0.05)	0.5 (0.02)	1.8 (0.07)	10.1 (0.4)
Source 1: NOAA (1964-1990)
Source 2: climatebase.ru (humidity)

== Transportation ==
Aoulef lies on the N52 national highway, which connects it to Reggane and eventually Adrar to the west and In Salah to the east. A provincial road connects the town to Timokten, located just to the northwest of Aoulef.

== Education ==
11.1% of the population has a tertiary education (the highest rate in the province), and another 22.4% has completed secondary education. The overall literacy rate is 84.6% (second highest in the province), and is 90.9% among males (second highest in the province) and 77.1% among females.

== Localities ==
As of 1984, the commune was composed of eight localities:

- Ouamanat
- Takaraft
- Djedid
- Gasbet Bellal
- Gasbet Maïkhaf
- Roukina
- Zaouit Heinoume
- Habbadat
