= Tit, Adrar =

Tit ﺗﻴﺖ
- Town and commune
- Location of Tit commune within Adrar Province

- Location of Tit in Algeria
- Coordinates: 26°56′20″N 1°29′30″E
- Country: Algeria
- Province: Adrar
- District: Aoulef
- Elevation: 277 m (909 ft)

Population (2008)
  - Total: 4,417
- Time zone: UTC+1 (CET)

Tit (Arabic: ﺗﻴﺖ) is a town and commune in Aoulef District, Adrar Province, south-central Algeria. According to the 2008 census it has a population of 4,417, up from 3,160 in 1998, with an annual growth rate of 3.5%.

== Geography ==
The town of Tit lies at an elevation of 277 metres (909 ft) on the northern side of an oasis, not far from the border with Tamanrasset Province to the east. The oasis is a part of the Tidikelt region of the central Sahara that extends from central eastern Adrar Province (where Tit is located) to northeast Tamanrasset Province around In Salah. The oases in this region are sparser than in the Tuat and Gourara regions in which most of the population of Adrar Province live, but there are still a number of towns such as Aoulef, Timokten, Akabli, and In Ghar. The nearby land is mostly flat aside from some small hills to the east; however further north the land rises to the Tademaït plateau.

== Climate ==
Tit has a hot desert climate (Köppen climate classification BWh), with extremely hot summers and mild winters, and very little precipitation throughout the year.

Climate data for Tit
Month	Jan	Feb	Mar	Apr	May	Jun	Jul	Aug	Sep	Oct	Nov	Dec	Year
Mean daily maximum °C (°F)	21.1 (70.0)	24.5 (76.1)	28.9 (84.0)	33.2 (91.8)	37.8 (100.0)	43.3 (109.9)	45.1 (113.2)	44.0 (111.2)	40.9 (105.6)	34.5 (94.1)	27.6 (81.7)	22.2 (72.0)	33.6 (92.5)
Daily mean °C (°F)	13.8 (56.8)	16.8 (62.2)	20.8 (69.4)	25.1 (77.2)	29.9 (85.8)	35.2 (95.4)	37.1 (98.8)	36.4 (97.5)	33.4 (92.1)	27.0 (80.6)	20.2 (68.4)	14.9 (58.8)	25.9 (78.6)
Mean daily minimum °C (°F)	6.5 (43.7)	9.2 (48.6)	12.7 (54.9)	17.0 (62.6)	22.0 (71.6)	27.2 (81.0)	29.2 (84.6)	28.8 (83.8)	25.9 (78.6)	19.5 (67.1)	12.8 (55.0)	7.6 (45.7)	18.2 (64.8)
Average precipitation mm (inches)	1 (0.0)	2 (0.1)	3 (0.1)	1 (0.0)	1 (0.0)	0 (0)	0 (0)	1 (0.0)	1 (0.0)	2 (0.1)	2 (0.1)	2 (0.1)	16 (0.5)
Source: climate-data.org

== Transportation ==
Tit is connected by a 6 kilometres (3.7 mi) long road to the N52 national highway, which connects it to Aoulef and eventually Adrar to the west and In Salah to the east.

== Education ==
7.0% of the population has a tertiary education, and another 22.9% has completed secondary education. The overall literacy rate is 92.8%, and is 96.7% among males and 89.3% among females; all three rates are the highest in the province for any commune.

== Localities ==
As of 1984, the commune was composed of one locality, Tit.
