= Gerboise bleue (film) =

- Directed by: Djamel Ouahab
- Screenplay by: Djamel Ouahab
- Produced by: Kalame Films Bladi Films
- Cinematography: Djamel Ouahab
- Edited by: Djamel Ouahab
- Music by: Hugues Tabar-Nouval
- Release date: 2009
- Running time: 90 minutes
- Countries: Algeria; France

Gerboise bleue is a 2009 documentary film.

== Synopsis ==
Between 1960 and 1966, France carried out four atmospheric nuclear tests and another thirteen underground tests south of Reggane (Algerian Sahara). The first was called Gerboise bleue ("Blue Jerboa") and was four times as powerful as the bomb dropped on Hiroshima.

Fifty years later, the French Army still refuses to acknowledge its responsibility towards the populations exposed to radiation from the explosions. For the first time, French and Tuareg survivors speak of their fight to have their illnesses recognized as such, and reveal in what the conditions the tests were carried out.

== Awards ==
- Festival internacional de cine francófono de Tübingen-Stuttgart 2009
