= Adrar Province =

Province of Algeria

Adrar Province ولاية أدرار
- Province
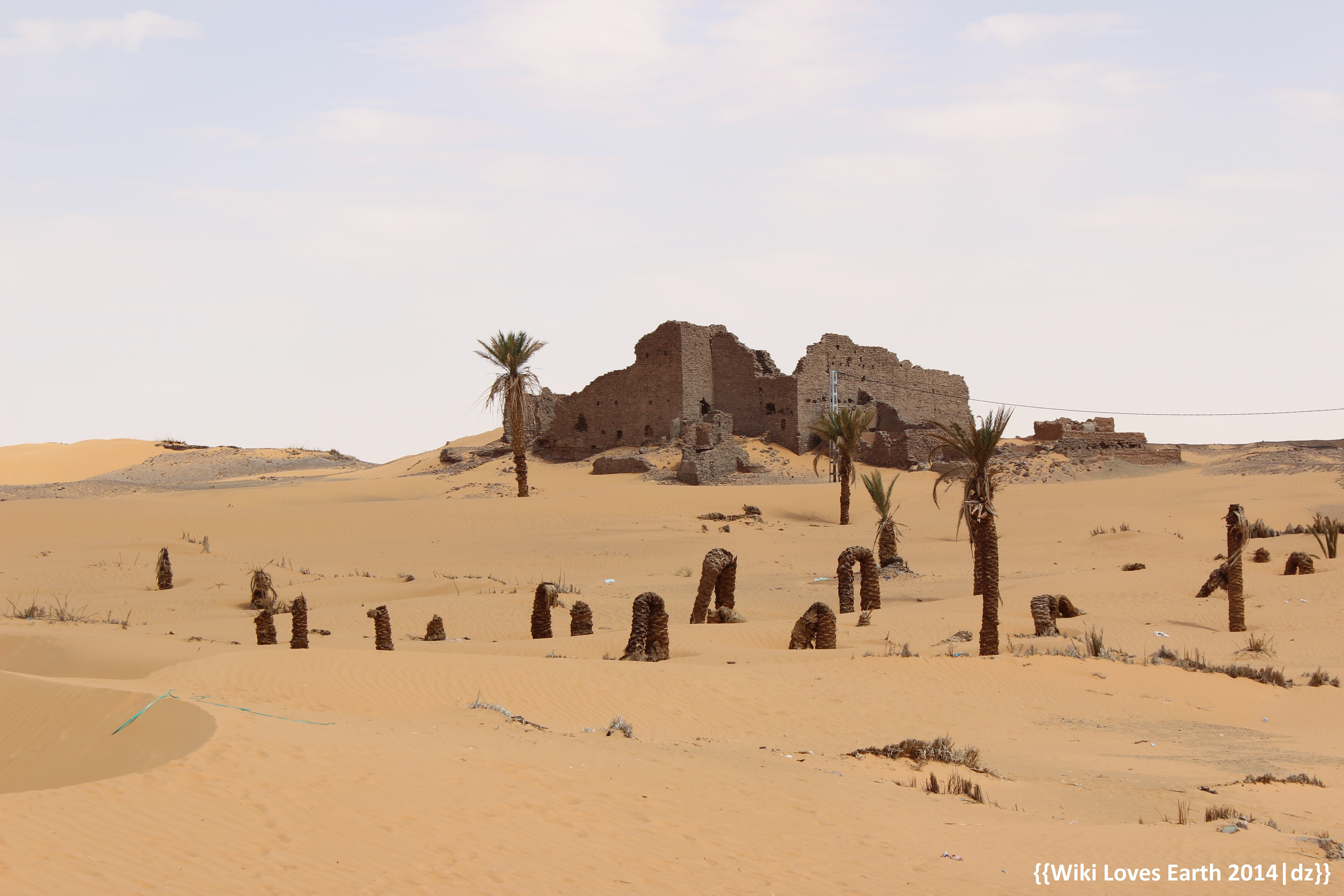

- Map of Algeria highlighting Adrar
- Coordinates: 27°52′50″N 0°17′50″W
- Country: Algeria
- Capital: Adrar

Government
  - PPA president: Mr. Menad Mehdi (FLN)
  - Wāli: Mr. Ali Bouguerra

Area
  - Total: 242,139 km^{2} (93,490 sq mi)
- Elevation: 276 m (906 ft)

Population (2008)
  - Total: 401,297
  - Density: 1.65730/km^{2} (4.29239/sq mi)
- Time zone: UTC+01 (CET)
- Area Code: +213 (0) 49
- ISO 3166 code: DZ-01
- Districts: 6
- Municipalities: 16
- Website: www.wilaya-adrar.dz

Adrar (Arabic: ولاية أدرار, Berber languages: ⴰⴷⵔⴰⵔ) is a province (wilaya) in southwestern Algeria, named after its capital Adrar. It is the second-largest province, with an area of 254 000 km^{2}, roughly the size of the US state of Wyoming. It had 401,297 inhabitants at the 2008 population census.

The provincial capital, named Adrar, serves as the administrative and economic center of the region. Historically, the province's oases have served as waypoints for Saharan caravan routes. These settlements are well known for their red mud-brick architecture and longstanding traditions in Islamic scholarship and desert agriculture.

The economy of Adrar Province relies primarily on agriculture, particularly date palm cultivation and cereal farming. Between 2021 and 2022, the area under cultivation increased by over 22%, with more than 20,300 hectares now dedicated to crops including durum wheat, barley, oats, and vegetables. The government has also promoted sustainable irrigation to support desert farming. Beyond agriculture, Adrar possesses mineral wealth such as phosphates and has been involved in limited oil and gas exploration projects. The University of Adrar, established in 2001, has been instrumental in expanding access to higher education and conducting research on Saharan ecology and indigenous cultures.

It is bordered by six other wilayas: to the west by Tindouf, to the northwest by Béni Abbès, to the north by Timimoun, to the east by In Salah, to the southeast by Tamanrasset, To the south by Bordj Badji Mokhtar, and to the southwest by Mauritania.

Adrar is composed of three natural and cultural regions: Touat (Adrar, Zaouiet Kounta), Gourara (Aougrout, Timimoune) and Tidikelt (Aoulef), and 299 ksour.

== History ==
The province was created from parts of the Oasis Province and Saoura Province in 1974.

On 26 November 2019, Adrar was split into 3 provinces: Timimoun, Adrar, and Bordj Badji Mokhtar.

== Geography ==
=== Location ===
The province of Adrar is located in south-west Algeria. It is entirely located in the Sahara Desert.

== Administrative divisions ==
The province comprises 6 districts (daïras) and 16 communes or municipalities (baladiyahs). The following table shows the list of districts in the province of Adrar and all the communes in each district.

District	Number of communes	Communes	Area (km^{2})	Population
Adrar	3	Adrar • Bouda • Ouled Ahmed Timmi	9,423	64,547
Aoulef	4	Akabli • Aoulef • Timokten • Tit	23,936	40,036
Fenoughil	3	Fenoughil • Tamentit • Tamest	20,970	24,532
Reggane	2	Reggane • Sali	140,981	25,483
T'Sabit	2	Sbaa • Tsabit	19,446	13,821
Zaouiet Kounta	2	Zaouiet Kounta • In Zghmir	15,100	28,593

=== Districts ===
1. Adrar
2. Aoulef
3. Fenoughil
4. Reggane
5. T'Sabit
6. Zaouiet Kounta

=== Communes ===
No.	Commune	Arabic	Population
01	Adrar	أدرار	43,903
02	Tamest	تامست	6,658
03	Reggane	رقان	14,179
04	In Zghmir	ان زقمير	14,062
05	Tit	تيط	3,160
06	Tsabit	تسابيت	11,832
07	Zaouiet Kounta	زاوية كنتة	14,531
08	Aoulef	أولف	15,229
09	Timokten (Timoktene, Timekten, Tamekten)	تمقطن	14,134
10	Tamentit (Tamantit)	تمنطيط	7,912
11	Fenoughil	فنوغيل	9,962
12	Sali	سالى	11,304
13	Akabli	أقبلى	7,513
14	Ouled Ahmed Timmi (Ouled Ahmed Temmi)	أولاد أحمد تيمى	11,976
15	Bouda	بودة	8,668
16	Sbaa (Sbaa)	السبع	1,989

== See also ==
- In Belbel
- Krettamia
