= In Belbel =

Date-palm oasis town in Algeria

- Town
- Location of InBelbel within Algeria
- Coordinates: 27°53′16″N 1°10′7″E
- Country: Algeria
- Province: Adrar

Population (2009)
  - Total: 962
- Time zone: UTC+1 (CET)

In Belbel is a town located in a small isolated oasis in the Sahara Desert of central Algeria, about 142 kilometres (88 mi) by air east of Adrar. As of 2009 it had a population of 962 people.

== History ==
The village was established in the early 19th century.

In 1982 the town had a population of 464, which doubled until 2009, reaching 962.

In the early 2000s a documentary was made in the town, Le japonais d'In Belbel, which followed the activities of a United Nations University researcher conducting field research in the area and highlighting the importance of studying such remote locations in the desert.

== Geography and resources ==
In Belbel lies at the south edge of the Tademait Plateau in the centre of the Algerian Sahara, about 142 kilometres (88 mi) by air and 246 kilometres (153 mi) by road east of Adrar. It relies on date palm as its main agricultural resource. During times of occasional heavy rainfall, the wadis in the vicinity display a significant variety of fauna and flora.

== Education ==
In 2005, the town had seven teachers and 140 pupils, including girls. 15 km to the east of the town is the oasis of Matrioune which also has a small school.
