= In Salah Province =

Province of Algeria

Ain Salah Province ولاية عين صالح
- Province
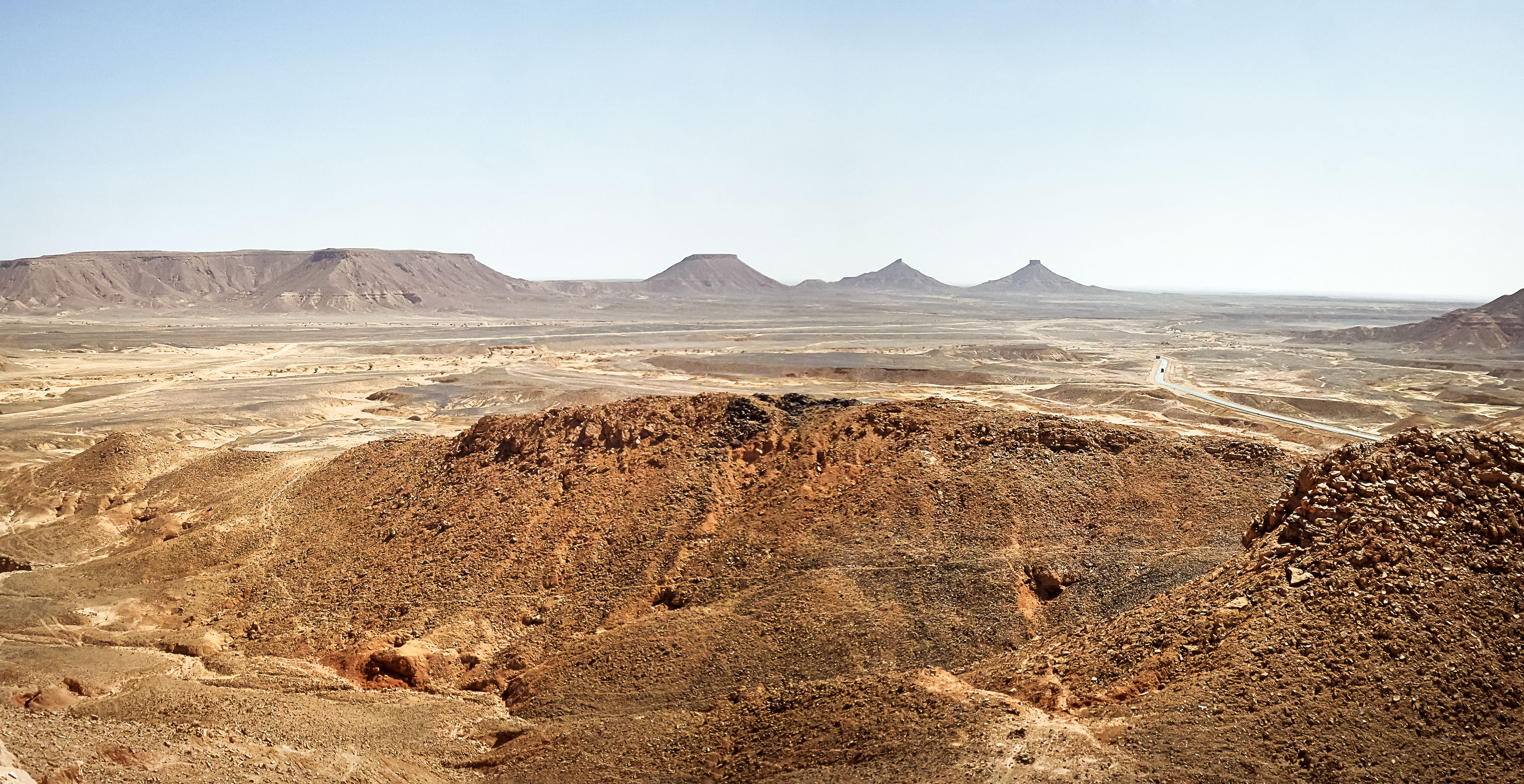

- Map of Algeria highlighting in Salah
- Coordinates: 27°11′50″N 2°29′00″E
- Country: Algeria
- Capital: Ain Salah

Area
  - Total: 131,220 km^{2} (50,660 sq mi)
- Elevation: 276 m (906 ft)

Population (2008)
  - Total: 50,392
  - Density: 0.38403/km^{2} (0.99462/sq mi)
- Time zone: UTC+01 (CET)
- Area Code: +213 (0) 49
- ISO 3166 code: DZ-01
- Districts: 2
- Municipalities: 3

The wilaya of Ain Salah (Arabic: ولاية عين صالح) is an Algerian wilaya created in 2019, previously, a delegated wilaya created in 2015. It is in the Algerian Sahara.

== Geography ==
The wilaya of Ain Salah is in the Algerian Sahara, its area 131,220 km².

It is delimited by:

- to the north by the El Menia Province and Ouargla Province;
- to the east by the Illizi Province;
- to the northwest by Timimoun Province;
- to the west by the wilaya of Adrar;
- and to the south by Tamanrasset Province.

== History ==
Ain Salah is rumoured to have been named after Salah Bey who led an expedition that led as far south into the region of Ain Salah after the people of Touat were late in paying taxes. The area was historically ruled by the Deylik of Algiers. The area was ruled by Ottoman Dey of Algiers who had the nominal ruler of the area of the country south of In Salah, since the expedition into the In Salah 1576. İt later became more troubling than it had been in years

The wilaya of Ain Salah was created on November 26, 2019. Previously, it was a delegated wilaya, created on May 27, 2015, creating administrative districts in certain wilayas and fixing the specific rules related to them, as well as the list of municipalities that are attached to it. Before 2019, it was attached to the Tamanrasset Province.

== Organization of the wilaya ==
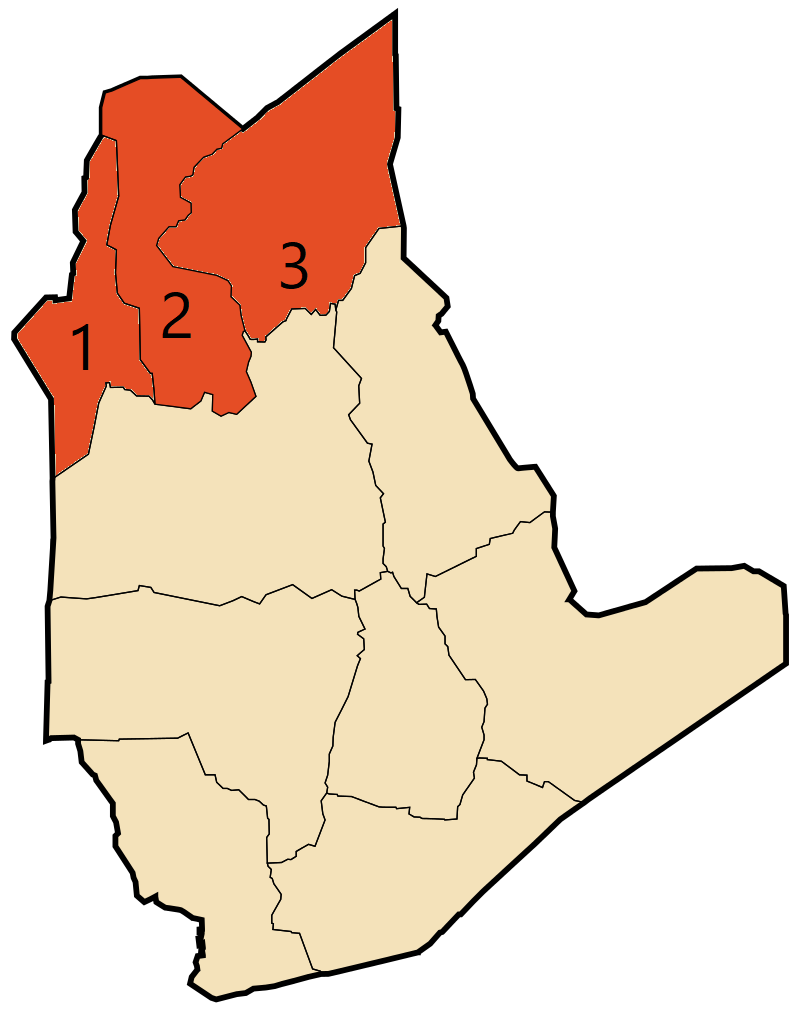

During the administrative breakdown of 2015, the delegated wilaya of Ain Salah is made up of 2 districts and 3 communes.

=== List of walis ===
District	Commune	Arabic
Ain Ghar District	Ain Ghar	عين غار
Ain Salah District	Foggaret Ezzaouia	فقارة الزوى
Ain Salah District	Ain Salah	عين صالح

== Demography ==
According to the general census of population and housing of 2008, all the municipalities of the wilaya of In Salah had a total 50,392 inhabitants
