= Algerian Desert =

Saharan region of Algeria

Algerian Sahara: الصحراء الجزائرية (Arabic); al-Ṣaḥrāʾ al-Jazāʾiriyya; ⵜⵉⵏⵉⵔⵉ ⵏ ⴷⵣⴰⵢⵔ (Berber languages); Tiniri n Dzayer
- Desert
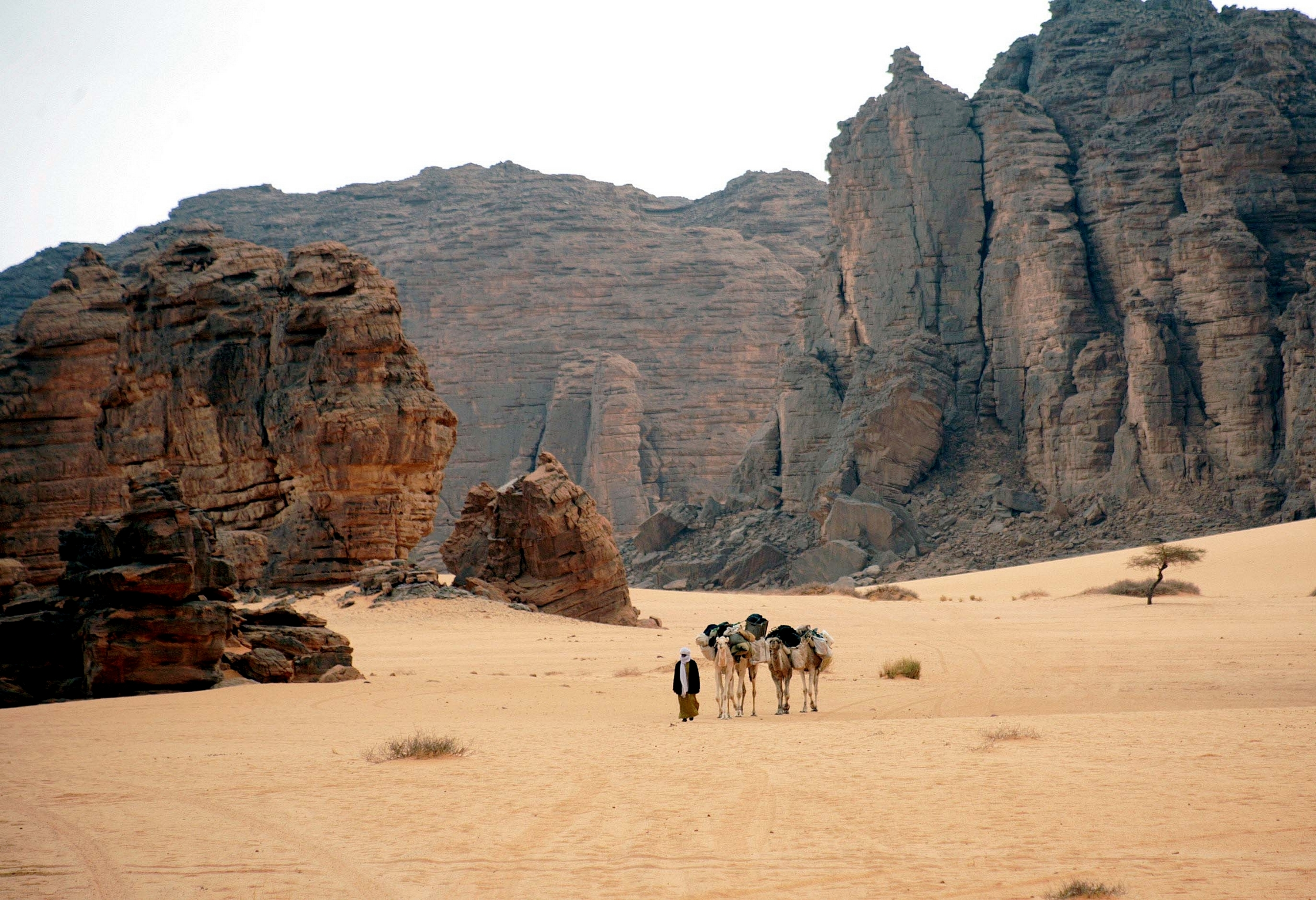
- Tuareg man with his camels in the Tassili n'Ajjer region

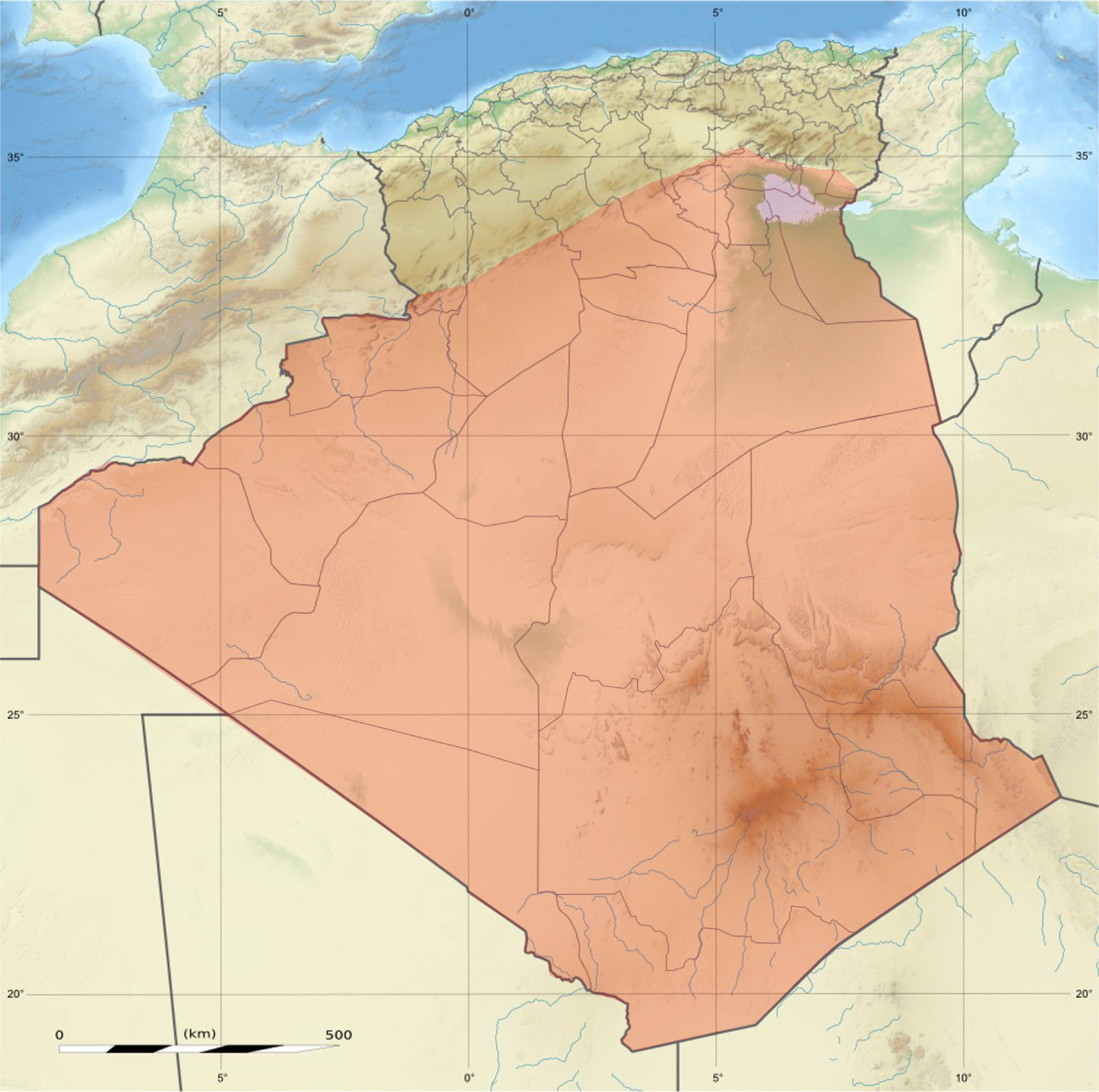
- Map of the Algerian Desert
- Coordinates: 25°N 4°E
- Location: Algeria, North Africa
- Elevation: 2,908 m (9,541 ft)

The Algerian Sahara (Arabic: الصحراء الجزائرية, romanized: al-Ṣaḥrāʾ al-Jazāʾiriyya; Berber languages: ⵜⵉⵏⵉⵔⵉ ⵏ ⴷⵣⴰⵢⵔ, romanized: Tiniri n Dzayer), also known as the Algerian Desert or the Great South, is the portion of the Sahara located within Algeria. It occupies most of the country's territory, approximately covering 80% of the total land area, and forms one of the largest national portions of the Sahara, the world's largest hot desert.

The region extends southwards to Algeria's borders with Mali, Niger and Libya. Its landscapes include extensive ergs (sand seas), regs (stony plains), hamadas, rocky plateaus, mountain massifs, dry valleys and wadis, salt flats and oasis systems. Among its principal geographical features are the Grand Erg Occidental, Grand Erg Oriental, Tademaït Plateau, Tanezrouft, Ahaggar and Tassili n'Ajjer.

Its expansion starts from the Saharan Atlas as a stony desert, gradually changing into a sand dune desert inland. The plateau of the Tassili n'Ajjer is located in the southeast, and its outstanding collection of prehistoric rock art saw it added to the UNESCO World Heritage List in 1982. Cities and towns such as Ouargla, Adrar, and particularly In Salah are among the hottest places in the Sahara. Annual average rainfall is well above 100 mm (3.9 in) in the northernmost part but the center and the southern part receive much less than 50 mm (2.0 in).

== Geography ==
The Sahara covers over 90% of Algerian territory. It is crossed by ergs (sand dunes), regs (stony terrain), as well as volcanic massifs in the far south. The Algerian Desert is characterized by low rainfall, recording less than 100 mm per year. However, it rarely snows and floods, sometimes reviving the wadis (river valleys) that have been dry since prehistoric times. The subsoil is full of water in the Albian Aquifer which extends under a large part of the Algerian Desert, a remnant of the steppe climate that the region experienced 10,000 years ago.

In the north, the grass of the steppe slowly becomes rarer while the species change until it makes way for the reg. The erg, the sandy desert, covers only a fifth of the Sahara. The Grand Erg Oriental (Great Eastern Sand Sea) borders the Wadi Righ, a succession of oases that stretches along the underground wadi. The Saoura valley limits the Grand Erg Occidental to the west. Between these two large ergs is the M'zab valley cut into a plateau. The northern Algerian Desert contains several oases, as opposed to the southern Algerian Desert, that is dominated by the Hoggar massif at an altitude of more than 3,000 meters. Vast monotonous hamadas (hard rocky desert plateaus) like the Tademaït plateau between El Goléa and In Salah connect the large geographical areas of the Sahara.
