= In Zghmir =

Coordinates: 27°05′38″N 0°07′14″W

- Interactive map of In Zghmir
- Country: Algeria
- Province: Adrar

Population (1998)
  - Total: 14,062
- Time zone: UTC+1 (West Africa Time)

In Zghmir (also known as In Z'Ghmir) is a town in south-central Algeria.

It is located in the Tamanrasset Province, within the Sahara Desert region.

The settlement lies near the Trans-Sahara Highway, which connects the southern parts of Algeria with Niger.

The local population is primarily engaged in small-scale trade and pastoralism.
