= Expedition to Touat (1557) =

- Part of Conflicts between the Regency of Algiers and Morocco
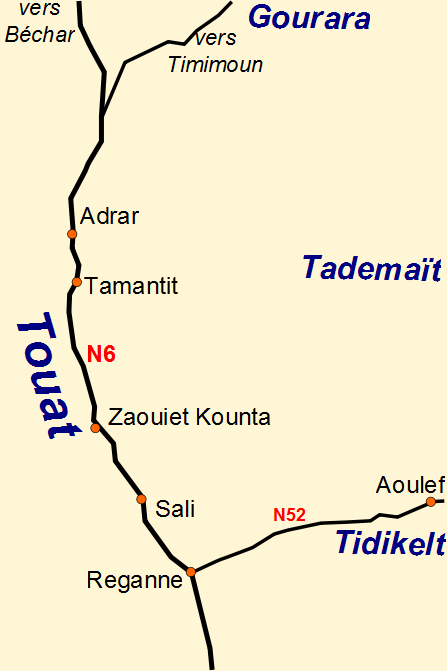
- Map displaying the Touat region
Date	1557
Location	Touat, Algeria
Result	Algerian victory

Belligerents
Saadi dynasty	Touat; Regency of Algiers

Commanders and leaders
Abu Abdullah Muhammad	Caïd Ahmed ben Amor Et-Tamentiti

Strength
Unknown	Unknown

Casualties and losses
Unknown	Unknown

The Expedition to Touat was a campaign led by the Saadi dynasty and commanded by the governor of Sijilmasa with the aim of establishing Saadi rule in the region, however the expedition was defeated.

The Saadians led a number of expeditions to Touat led by caïds. Aware of the economic significance of the region, they first attempted to establish rule there peacefully, however this was unsuccessful. As a result, the Saadians decided to use force, first dispatching the Saadi princes Moulay Zaydan and al-Nasir in 1552. This expedition was defeated in the Battle of Kaberten by the people of Touat and the caïd Ahmed ben Amor Et-Tamentiti was able to rule over the region independently. In 1557 another attempt was made by the Saadi dynasty.

In 1555 Mohammed al-Shaykh, the reigning Saadi sultan, entered into negotiations with the Spanish in order to form an alliance against the Regency of Algiers. In 1557 he led a campaign against Tlemcen and at the same time he targeted Touat and dispatched the governor of Sijilmasa, Abu Abdullah Muhammad, to command a campaign in order to occupy the region. The people of Touat resisted and refused to surrender, they refused to be annexed to the Saadi sultanate as they wished to maintain autonomy and a connection to the Caliphate in Algeria. The rulers of the Regency of Algiers led a campaign to Touat in order to break the siege imposed by the Saadians. The forces of the Regency of Algiers thwarted the Saadian campaign and defeated it, as a result the Saadian campaign was a failure and the governor of Sijilmasa was forced to return empty handed.
