= Antonio Malfante =

Genoese trader

Antonio Malfante (?–1450) was a Genoese trader known for traveling to Africa on behalf of the Centurione Bank in 1447.

In a letter written in Latin from the Saharan oasis of Tuwat to a merchant in Genoa, Malfante reported on what he learned from an informant about the trans-Saharan trade. He listed several 'states', including one called 'Geni' and describes the Niger River: "Through these lands flows a very large river, which at certain times of the year inundates all these lands. This river passes by the gates of Thambet (Timbuktu).... There are many boats on it, by which they carry on trade".
