= Aoulef District =

Aoulef District دائرة أولف
- District
- Coordinates: 26°58′N 1°5′E
- Country: Algeria
- Province: Adrar Province
- Capital: Aoulef
- Elevation: 301 m (988 ft)

Population (2008)
  - Total: 54,909
- Time zone: UTC+1 (CET)

Aoulef District is a district of Adrar Province, Algeria. According to the 2008 census it has a population of 54,909.

== Communes ==
The district is further divided into 4 communes:

- Aoulef
- Akabli
- Timokten
- Tit
