= Reggane District =

Reggane District دائرة رقان
- District
- Coordinates: 26°43′N 0°10′E
- Country: Algeria
- Province: Adrar Province
- Capital: Reggane

Population (2008)
  - Total: 33,540
- Time zone: UTC+1 (CET)

Reggane District is a district of Adrar Province, Algeria. According to the 2008 census it has a population of 33,540.

== Communes ==
The district is further divided into 2 communes:

- Reggane
- Sali
