= Battle of Kaberten =

Date	1552
Location	Kaberten, Algeria
Result	Touat victory

Belligerents
Saadi dynasty	Touat

Commanders and leaders
Moulay Zaydan al-Nasir	Caïd Ahmed ben Amor Et-Tamentiti

Strength
Unknown	Unknown

Casualties and losses
Unknown	Unknown

The Battle of Kaberten took place in 1552 following an attempt to establish rule in the Touat region by the Saadi dynasty. The people of Touat defeated the Saadi expedition and consolidated their independence.

In 1552 the Saadi dynasty led an expedition to the Touat region. The expedition was led by Moulay Zaydan and al-Nasir, both of whom were sons of Ahmad al-Araj, and nephews of the reigning Saadi sultan Mohammed al-Shaykh. The aim of the expedition was to establish rule in the area. The Saadians realised the economic importance of the region, as their peaceful attempts to extend their influence over the region failed they launched an expedition to seize it with force. The campaign of the two brothers Moulay Zaydan and al-Nasir failed. The people of Tuat inflicted defeated the Saadians at Kaberten. From then on Tuat was independent under the rule of Caïd Ahmed ben Amor Et-Tamentiti. Another attempt to subdue the Tuat region in 1557 led by the governor of Sijilmasa was also defeated.
