= Algerian expedition to Tuat =

Event in 1579

Ottoman forces from the Regency of Algiers and the Regency of Tunis undertook an expedition to the oasis of Tuat, in the Sahara region of present-day Algeria, in 1579. They made further attempts to occupy the oasis after this and Saadi forces responded with their own occupation of the oasis in 1583.

== Expeditions ==
Following a raid by tribesmen from the Tafilalt in 1578, the leaders of the Tuat oasis sent a request for protection to Algiers. The next year, Ottoman forces from Algiers and Tunis were sent to the Tuat oasis. They established themselves in the ruins of another oasis, Tibechrine, and scouted all the nearby oases, before departing. They visited Tuat again in 1582.

== Aftermath ==
In 1583, the Saadi sultan Ahmad al-Mansur, in present-day Morocco, sent forces to occupy the oasis in order to prevent the Ottomans from gaining a foothold there. They established control over Tuat and the nearby oasis of Gurara. The Ottomans attempted to occupy Tuat again in 1589.

Even after the Moroccan conquest, the tribes continued to pay tribute to Hassan Veneziano and the rest of the Algerian Deys until the fall of the Regency of Algiers in 1830. Since the local tribes revolted several times against the Alawi dynasty and its authority over the Tuat region, Moroccan control remained largely nominal.
