= Bouda, Algeria =

Bouda ﺑﻮدة
- Commune
- Location of Bouda commune within Adrar Province

- Location of Bouda within Algeria
- Coordinates: 28°1′N 0°26′W
- Country: Algeria
- Province: Adrar
- District: Adrar
- Elevation: 243 m (797 ft)

Population (2008)
  - Total: 9,938
- Time zone: UTC+1 (CET)

Bouda (Arabic: ﺑﻮدة) is a commune in Adrar District, Adrar Province, in south-central Algeria. According to the 2008 census it has a population of 9,938, up from 8,668 in 1998, with an annual growth rate of 1.4%.

== Geography ==
The commune of Bouda covers the northernmost end of the string of oases comprising the Tuat region of the Algerian Sahara. The oases within Bouda form a crescent-shaped arc from the northwest to southwest. The main villages of the commune lie on the eastern side of the oasis, at an elevation of around 243 metres (797 ft).

== Climate ==
Bouda has a hot desert climate (Köppen climate classification BWh), with long, extremely hot summers and short, very warm winters, and averages just 16 millimetres (0.63 in) of rainfall per year.

Climate data for Bouda (Adrar Station)
Month	Jan	Feb	Mar	Apr	May	Jun	Jul	Aug	Sep	Oct	Nov	Dec	Year
Mean daily maximum °C (°F)	20.6 (69.1)	24.5 (76.1)	28.0 (82.4)	33.0 (91.4)	38.1 (100.6)	43.9 (111.0)	46.3 (115.3)	45.4 (113.7)	41.5 (106.7)	35.7 (96.3)	26.1 (79.0)	20.9 (69.6)	33.7 (92.6)
Daily mean °C (°F)	13.8 (56.8)	17.1 (62.8)	20.5 (68.9)	24.9 (76.8)	30.1 (86.2)	35.5 (95.9)	37.4 (99.3)	36.8 (98.2)	33.4 (92.1)	27.6 (81.7)	19.2 (66.6)	14.1 (57.4)	25.9 (78.6)
Mean daily minimum °C (°F)	7.0 (44.6)	9.6 (49.3)	13.0 (55.4)	16.7 (62.1)	22.0 (71.6)	27.1 (80.8)	28.5 (83.3)	28.2 (82.8)	25.3 (77.5)	19.4 (66.9)	12.2 (54.0)	7.3 (45.1)	18.0 (64.5)
Average precipitation mm (inches)	2.3 (0.09)	1.3 (0.05)	2.6 (0.10)	4.1 (0.16)	0.3 (0.01)	0.1 (0.00)	0.0 (0.0)	0.2 (0.01)	0.2 (0.01)	1.5 (0.06)	0.6 (0.02)	1.4 (0.06)	14.6 (0.57)
Average relative humidity (%)	38.0	30.8	24.1	22.5	19.9	15.4	13.3	15.9	21.5	30.3	35.7	40.6	25.7
Source 1: Hong Kong Observatory (temperature 1964-1990, rainfall 1965-1990)
Source 2: climatebase.ru (extremes, humidity)

== Transportation ==
The villages in Bouda commune are connected by a provincial road to Adrar, the capital of the province, which lies on the N6 national highway. The nearest airport is Touat Cheikh Sidi Mohamed Belkebir Airport, located just east of Adrar.

== Education ==
The overall literacy rate of the population is 81.3%: 89.5% among males and 73.1% among females. 18.9% of the population has completed only a secondary education, 5.6% of the population has a tertiary education.

== Localities ==
As of 1984, the commune was composed of 11 localities:

- Ben Draou
- Zaouit El Cheikh
- Benillou
- Bakhalla
- Laamaryine
- El Ghomara
- Kessiba
- El Mansour
- Zaouit Sidi Haïda
- Gherm Ali
- Béni Oiazel
