= Krettamia =

Settlement in western Algeria

Coordinates: 28°41′N 3°32′W

Krettamia is a settlement in the Sahara Desert of western Algeria.
