= Adrar District =

Adrar District دائرة أدرار
- District
- Coordinates: 27°55′N 0°20′W
- Country: Algeria
- Province: Adrar Province
- Capital: Adrar

Population (2008)
  - Total: 88,266
- Time zone: UTC+1 (CET)

Adrar District is a district of Adrar Province, Algeria. With a population of 88,266, it is the most populated district in the province.

== Communes ==
The district is further divided into 3 communes:

- Adrar
- Bouda
- Ouled Ahmed Timmi
