= In Ghar =

In Ghar إن غار
- Commune and town
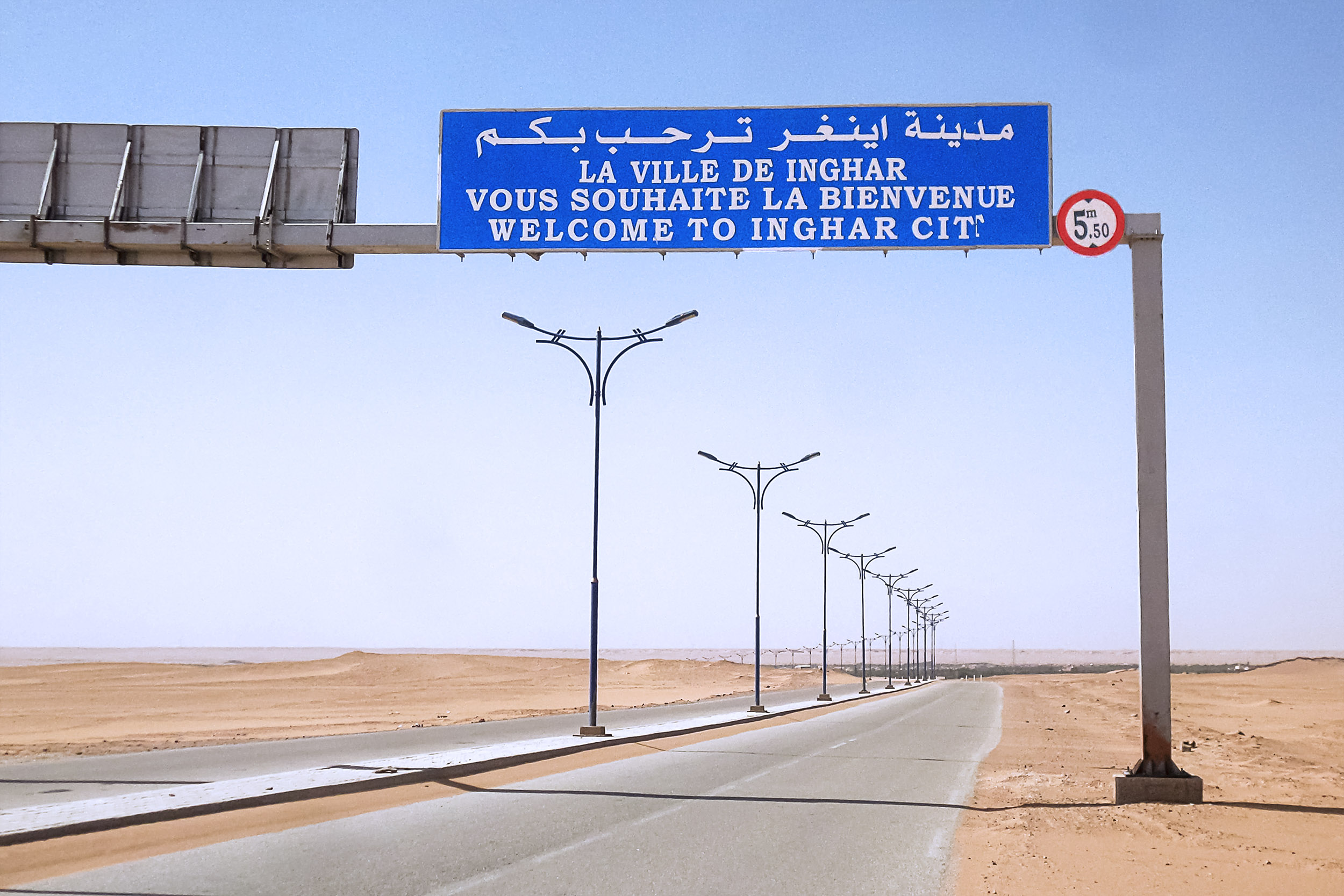

- Location of In Ghar commune within In Salah Province

- Location of In Ghar within Algeria
- Coordinates: 27°6′11″N 1°54′37″E
- Country: Algeria
- Province: In Salah
- District: In Ghar (coextensive)

Government
  - PMA Seats: 7

Area
  - Total: 28,969 km^{2} (11,185 sq mi)
- Elevation: 258 m (846 ft)

Population (2008)
  - Total: 11,225
  - Density: 0.38748/km^{2} (1.0036/sq mi)
- Time zone: UTC+01 (CET)
- Postal code: 11210
- ONS code: 1103

In Ghar (Arabic: عين غار, lit. Cave spring) is a town and commune, coextensive with the district of In Ghar, in In Salah Province, Algeria. According to the 2008 census it has a population of 11,225, up from 8,059 in 1998, with an annual growth rate of 3.4%. Its postal code is 11210 and its municipal code is 1103.

== Geography ==
In Ghar lies at an elevation of 258 metres (846 ft) on a flat plain in the Sahara Desert of southern Algeria. An oasis lies to the east of the town; it is extensively used for agriculture.

== Climate ==
In Ghar has a hot desert climate (Köppen climate classification BWh), with long, extremely hot summers and short, very warm winters, little to no precipitation throughout the year, as well as permanent sunshine and clear skies.

Climate data for In Ghar (In Salah station)
Month	Jan	Feb	Mar	Apr	May	Jun	Jul	Aug	Sep	Oct	Nov	Dec	Year
Mean daily maximum °C (°F)	21.6 (70.9)	25.1 (77.2)	28.6 (83.5)	33.2 (91.8)	38.6 (101.5)	44.1 (111.4)	46.4 (115.5)	45.5 (113.9)	41.9 (107.4)	35.1 (95.2)	27.1 (80.8)	21.9 (71.4)	34.1 (93.4)
Daily mean °C (°F)	14.3 (57.7)	17.6 (63.7)	21.0 (69.8)	25.2 (77.4)	30.4 (86.7)	35.9 (96.6)	37.7 (99.9)	37.2 (99.0)	33.8 (92.8)	27.4 (81.3)	20.1 (68.2)	14.9 (58.8)	26.3 (79.3)
Mean daily minimum °C (°F)	7.1 (44.8)	10.0 (50.0)	13.3 (55.9)	17.1 (62.8)	22.1 (71.8)	27.6 (81.7)	29.2 (84.6)	28.8 (83.8)	25.8 (78.4)	19.7 (67.5)	13.0 (55.4)	7.8 (46.0)	18.5 (65.2)
Average precipitation mm (inches)	3.7 (0.15)	3.5 (0.14)	1.2 (0.05)	1.6 (0.06)	0.5 (0.02)	0.1 (0.00)	0.0 (0.0)	0.5 (0.02)	0.2 (0.01)	1.2 (0.05)	0.5 (0.02)	2.7 (0.11)	15.7 (0.63)
Average relative humidity (%)	41.3	35.0	27.1	23.8	20.8	17.7	15.6	16.8	21.9	29.9	35.8	41.9	27.3
Source 1: NOAA (1964-1990)
Source 2: climatebase.ru (humidity)

== Transportation ==
In Ghar lies on the northern side of the N52 national highway which connects the town to Aoulef and Reggane to the west and In Salah to the east.

== Education ==
3.5% of the population has a tertiary education, and another 22.5% has completed secondary education. The overall literacy rate is 84.2%, and is 91.4% among males and 76.1% among females.

== Localities ==
The commune is composed of eight localities:

- In Ghar
- Laksar
- Tourfine
- Chouiter
- Lahdeb
- Akbour
- Miliana
- Sebkha
- Ez Zaouia
