= Reggane =

Reggane رقان
- Commune and town
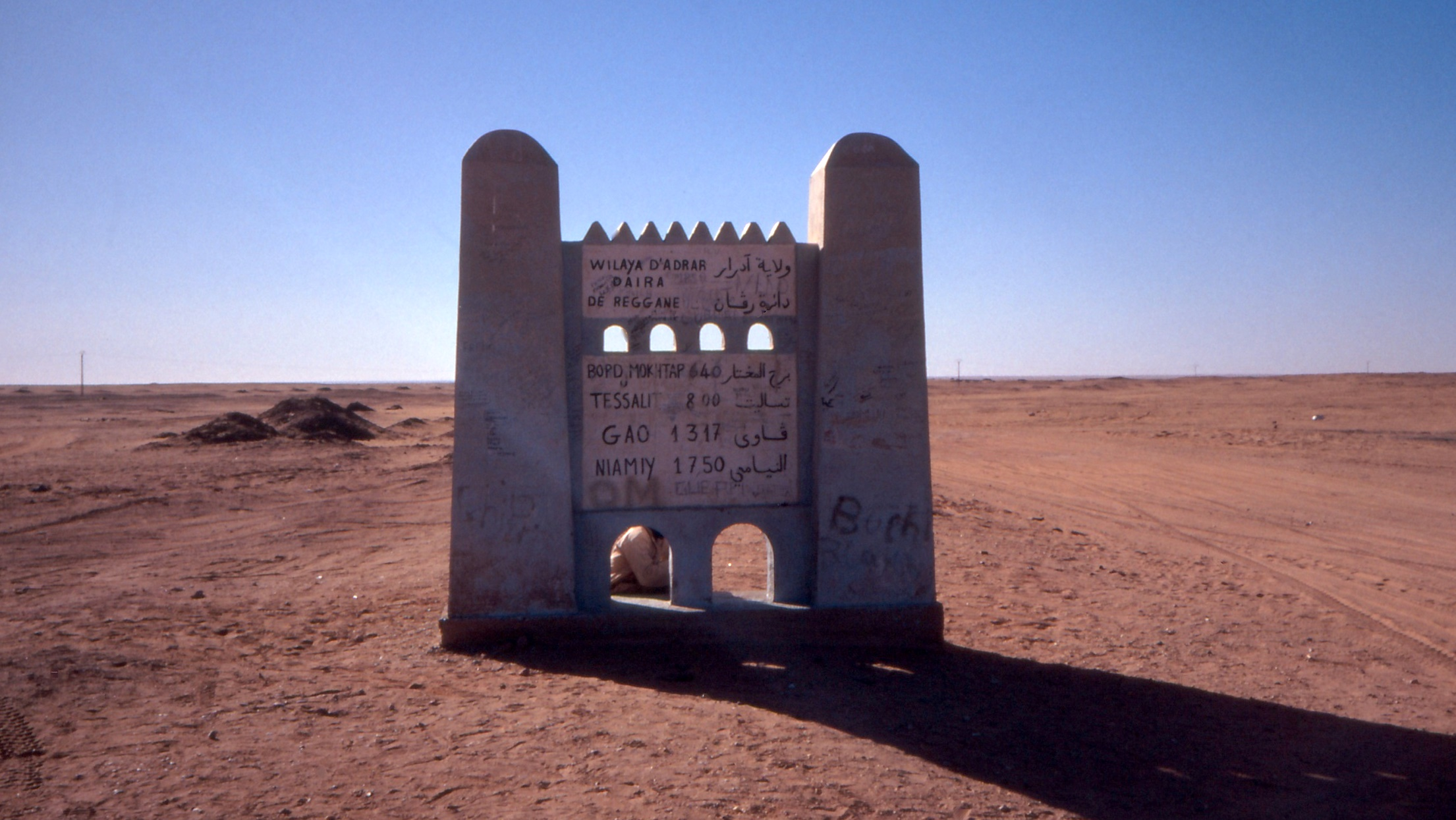

- Location of Reggane Commune within Adrar Province

- Location of Reggane within Algeria
- Coordinates: 26°43′13″N 0°10′22″E
- Country: Algeria
- Province: Adrar Province
- District: Reggane District
- Elevation: 217 m (712 ft)

Population (2008)
  - Total: 20,402
- Time zone: UTC+1 (CET)

Reggane (from Berber "Argan"; Arabic: رقان) is a town and commune, and the capital of Reggane District, in Adrar Province, central Algeria. Reggane lies in the Sahara Desert near an oasis. According to the 2008 census it has a population of 20,402, up from 14,179 in 1998, with an annual growth rate of 3.8%. Berber tribes and people live in and around Reggane.

== History ==
Reggane has long functioned as an important crossroads point and oasis for trans-Saharan trade routes. Ancient Arabs and/or Berbers also knew of diamonds in the area, calling the area Bilād al-mās (ﺱﺎﻣﻟﺍ, “country of the diamond”).

=== French nuclear testing ===
The Évian Accords, which outlined the terms of Algerian independence in 1962, granted France the rights to continue military testing on Algerian soil. To the east of Reggane there was, until 1965, a rocket launching site where numerous civilian and military ballistic rockets were launched. France began its nuclear testing program in the vicinity of Reggane, conducting four such tests during the Algerian War in 1960 and 1961, before independence, and several after. The French government claimed the tests were taking place in an uninhabited area, yet thousands of people lived in the radiation zone and were not warned properly about the tests. The French also did not properly dispose of the irradiated objects from the tests, which were soon uncovered by the desert winds. Since then, the local populations have dealt with significantly higher rates of liver, skin, and stomach cancers, as well as blindness and babies being born with atrophied limbs.

== Geography ==
The town of Reggane and its neighbouring villages lie next to the southernmost oasis of the Tuat region, which stretches northward to Adrar. The Tidikelt region, a plain with isolated oases, lies to the east, including towns such as In Salah, In Ghar, Aoulef and Tit. To the west is the sandy Erg Chech desert, while to the south lies the vast barren plain of the Tanezrouft.

== Climate ==
Reggane has a hot desert climate (Köppen climate classification BWh), with long, extremely hot summers and short, very warm winters. The climate is torrid and almost rainless. Daytime temperatures consistently approach 50 °C (122 °F) in summer and nighttime temperatures routinely remain above 30 °C (86 °F). Average annual rainfall is extremely low, with only 10 mm (0.39 in). The sky is always clear and sunny throughout the year. The area in the heart of the Algerian Desert bounded by Adrar - Reggane - In Salah is nicknamed the "triangle of fire" by local inhabitants due to the extreme heat that bakes the region from May to September.

Climate data for Reggane Airport
Month	Jan	Feb	Mar	Apr	May	Jun	Jul	Aug	Sep	Oct	Nov	Dec	Year
Mean daily maximum °C (°F)	22.6 (72.7)	25.2 (77.4)	31.9 (89.4)	36.4 (97.5)	40.2 (104.4)	44.1 (111.4)	46.9 (116.4)	45.5 (113.9)	42.3 (108.1)	35.8 (96.4)	28.7 (83.7)	24.9 (76.8)	35.59 (96.06)
Daily mean °C (°F)	16.0 (60.8)	18.2 (64.8)	23.1 (73.6)	27.9 (82.2)	32.2 (90.0)	36.4 (97.5)	39.8 (103.6)	38.4 (101.1)	35.5 (95.9)	29.2 (84.6)	22.0 (71.6)	17.8 (64.0)	28.34 (83.01)
Mean daily minimum °C (°F)	9.4 (48.9)	11.3 (52.3)	15.9 (60.6)	20.6 (69.1)	24.8 (76.6)	29.0 (84.2)	32.8 (91.0)	31.6 (88.9)	28.7 (83.7)	22.5 (72.5)	15.3 (59.5)	11.2 (52.2)	21.1 (70.0)
Average precipitation mm (inches)	1.4 (0.06)	1.1 (0.04)	1.2 (0.05)	1.6 (0.06)	0.5 (0.02)	0.1 (0.00)	0.0 (0.0)	0.5 (0.02)	0.2 (0.01)	1.2 (0.05)	0.5 (0.02)	1.8 (0.07)	10.1 (0.4)
Source: Global climatology for Reggane, Algeria (2000 - 2015)

== Transportation ==
Reggane is the last town on the Tanezrouft track heading south across the Sahara Desert to Mali. Customs and police inspection here are mandatory before crossing the Sahara Desert. The Tanezrouft track is the southern part of Algeria's N6 national highway, which connects to Adrar to the north and Bordj Badji Mokhtar to the south. Another highway, the N52, leads through the Tidikelt region to Aoulef and eventually In Salah.

The town is served by Reggane Airport, located about 10 kilometres (6.2 mi) east of the town.

== Education ==
6.0% of the population has a tertiary education, and another 15.6% has completed secondary education. The overall literacy rate is 75.9%, and is 85.0% among males and 66.3% among females.

== Localities ==
As of 1984, the commune was composed of 11 localities:

- Bahou
- El Mestour
- Zaouit Lahchef
- Anzeglouf
- Aït Massaoud
- En Nefis
- Timadanine
- Taarabt
- Tinoufel Djedida
- Tinoufel Elgadima
- Zaouit Reggani
- Taourirt
- Berriche

== See also ==
- Gerboise Bleue - France's first nuclear bomb, tested at Reggane
