= Tademaït =

Coordinates: 28.5°N 2.25°E

- Natural region
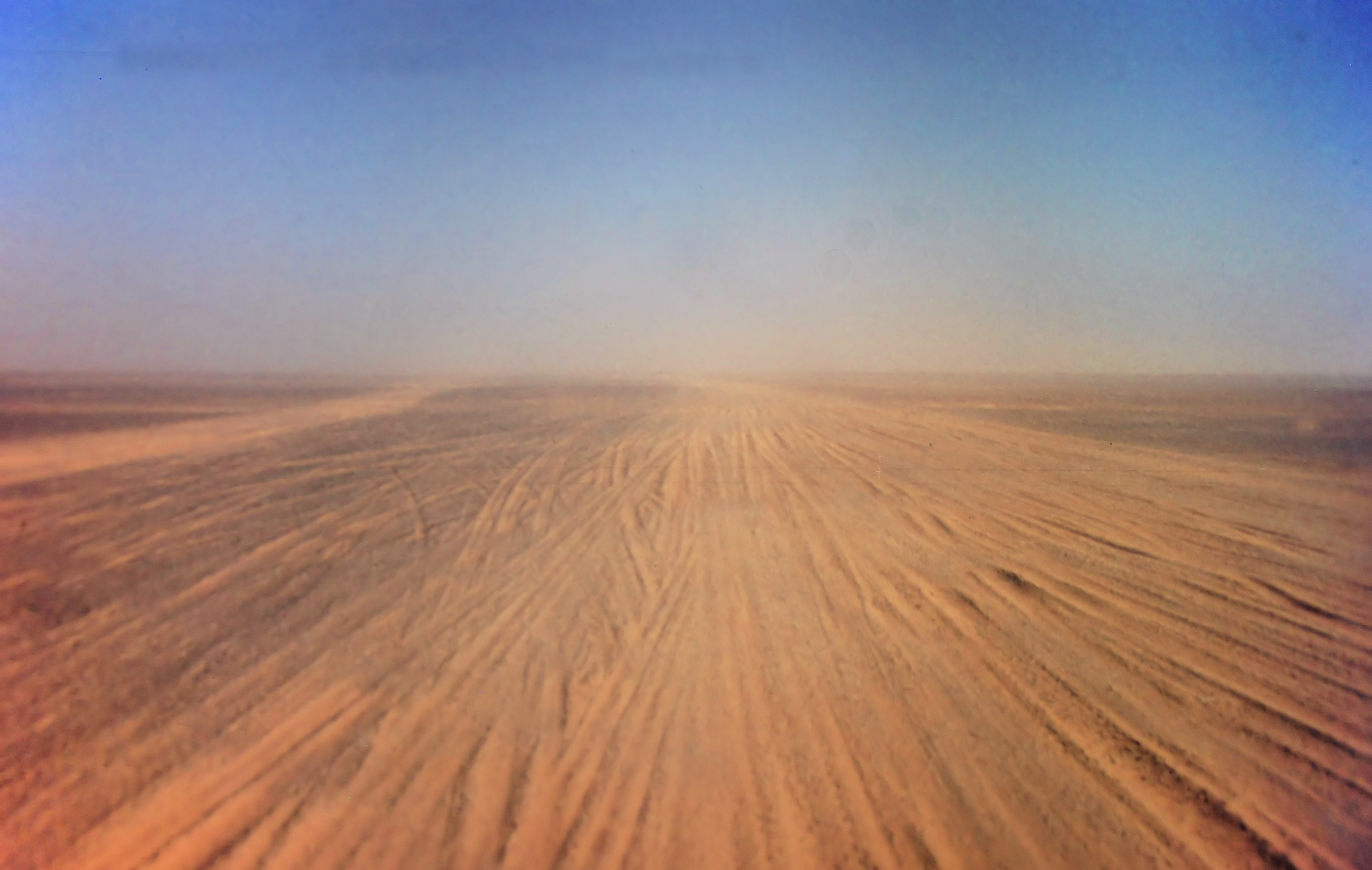
- The main road Algiers - Tamanrasset on the Tademait plateau, not yet paved in 1973

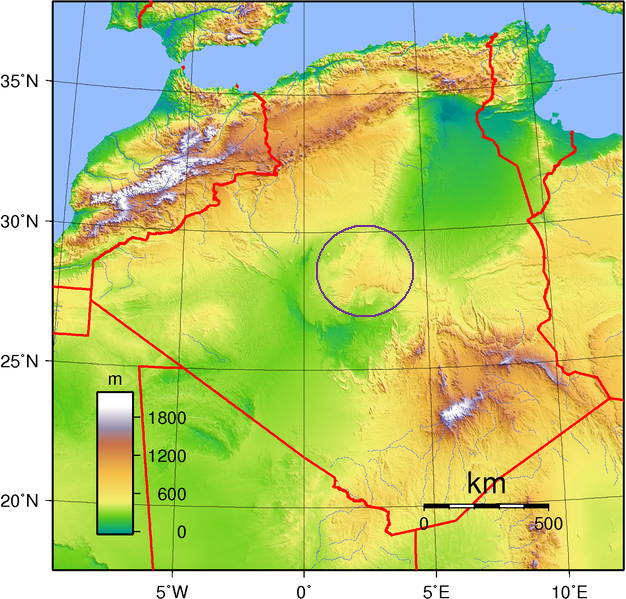
- Location of the Tademaït Plateau in Algeria.
- Country: Algeria
- Elevation: 600 m (2,000 ft)

Tademaït is a natural region in the Sahara Desert in the centre of Algeria. It is located north of In Salah and south of the Grand Erg Occidental in the Adrar District of Adrar Province, El Ménia District of Ghardaïa Province and the northern end of Tamanrasset Province. It is one of the places of the Sahara Desert where the summer heat is most extreme.

== Geography ==
The Tademaït is a rocky plateau made up of cretaceous terrain with a general slope towards the northeast. It is an extremely dry and hyper-arid area with a hot desert climate (Köppen climate classification BWh) as the region is virtually rainless throughout the year and it has long, extremely hot summers and short, very warm winters.

A meteorite was found in Tademaït in November 2002.

== See also ==
- Geography of Algeria
- Tuat
