= Adrar, Algeria =

Adrar ⴰⴷⵔⴰⵔ أدرار
- City
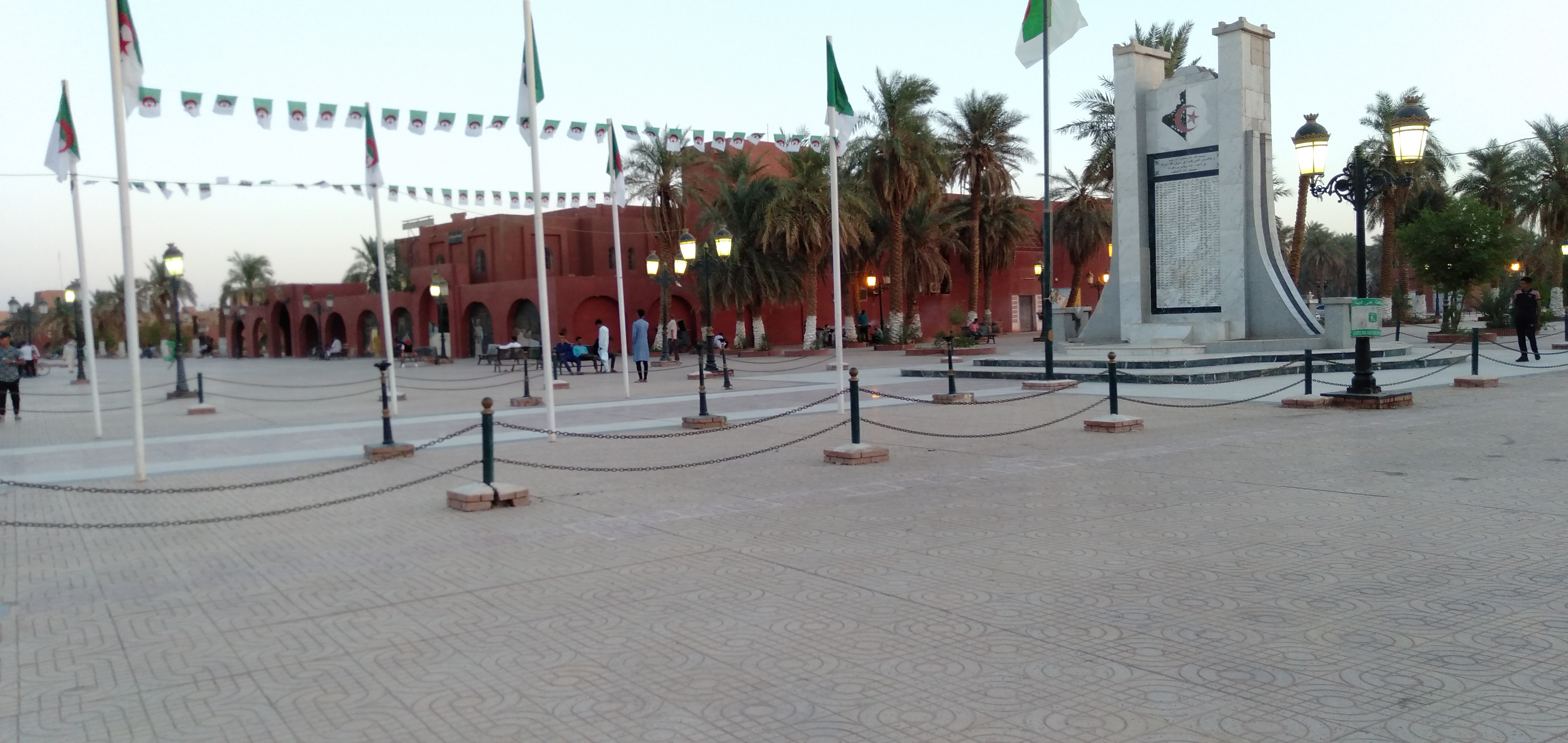
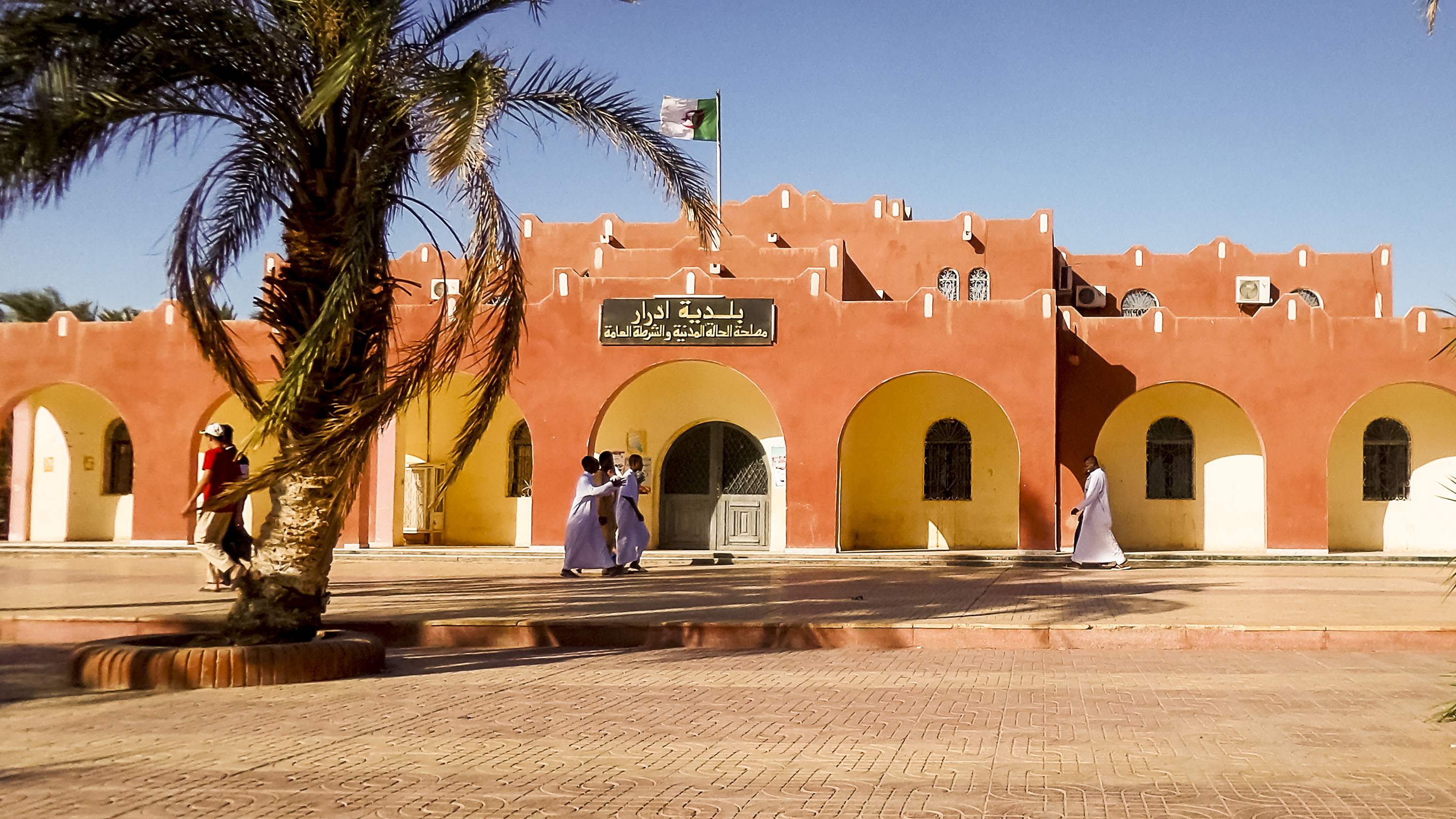
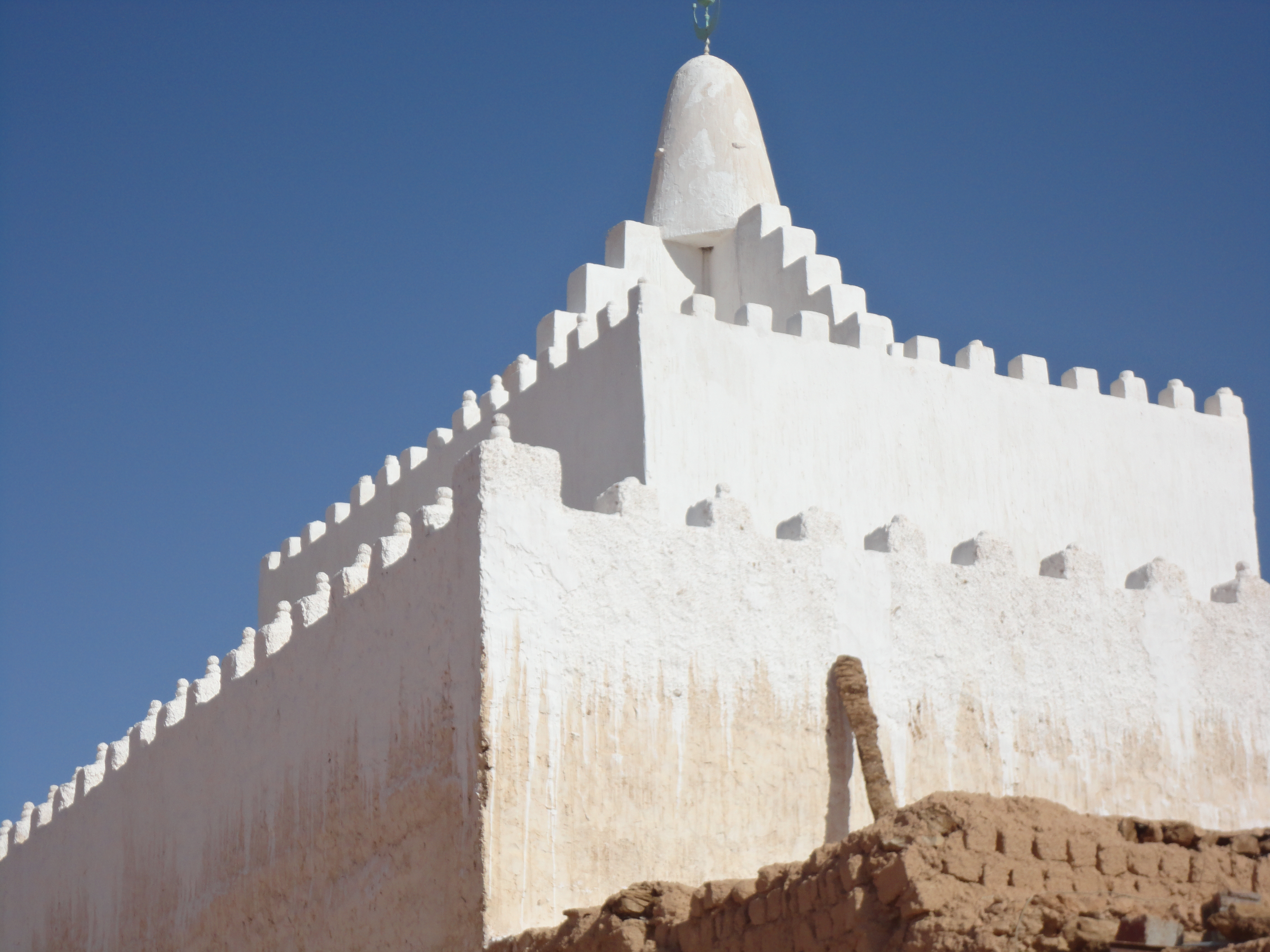
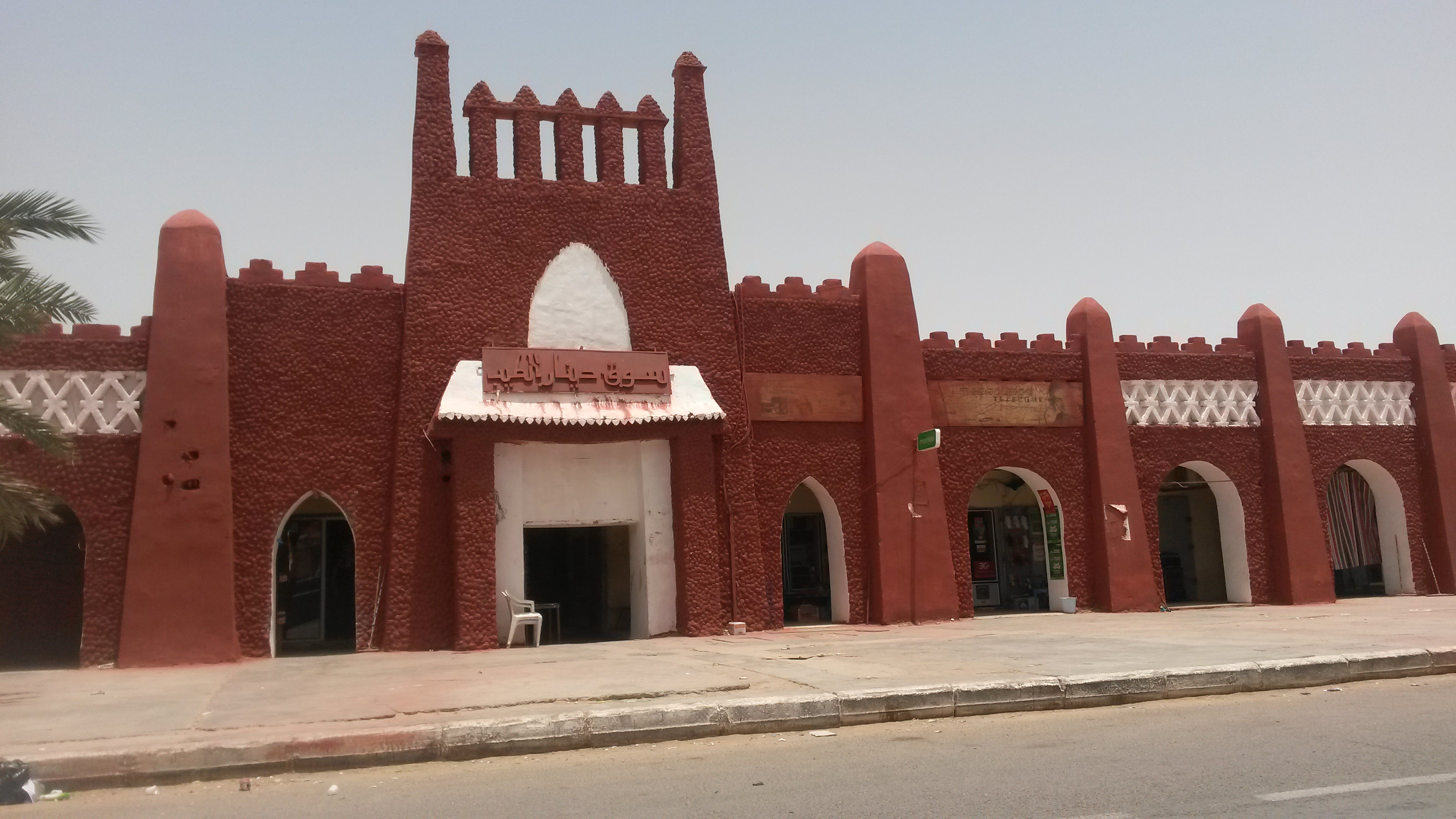
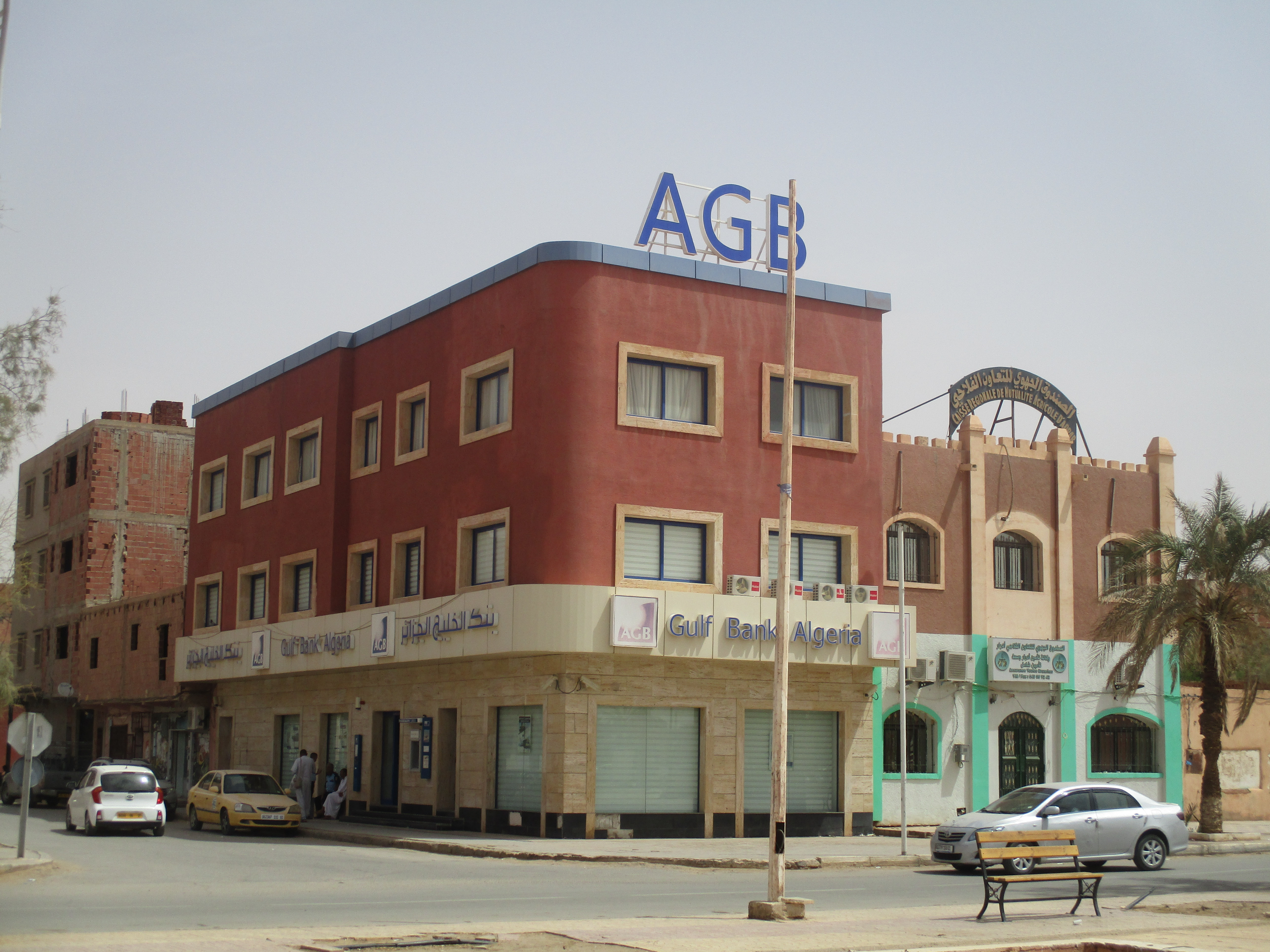
- Martyr's Square in Adrar Adrar's Town Hall Mausoleum in Zaouit Kounta Dinar Tayeb Market Algerian Gulf Bank in Martyrs Square Martyrs' Square

- Location of Adrar commune within Adrar Province

- Location of Adrar within Algeria
- Coordinates: 27°52′N 0°17′W
- Country: Algeria
- Province: Adrar Province
- District: Adrar District

Area
  - Total: 633 km^{2} (244 sq mi)
- Elevation: 258 m (846 ft)

Population (2008)
  - Total: 64,781
  - Density: 102/km^{2} (265/sq mi)
- Time zone: UTC+1 (CET)
- Postal code: 01000
- Area code: 0101
- Climate: BWh

Adrar (Tamazight: ⴰⴷⵔⴰⵔ romanized: Adrar, Arabic: أدرار) is the administrative capital of Adrar Province, the second largest province in Algeria. The commune is sited around an oasis in the Touat region of the Sahara Desert. According to a 2008 census, it has a population of 64,781, up from 43,903 in 1998, with an annual growth rate of 4.0%.

Adrar is mainly an agricultural town, characterized by its traditional irrigation system, the Foggara.

== Name ==
The city's name means "mountain" in Berber.

== History ==
Adrar is located in the Touat region, which was historically an important trade region for caravans crossing the Sahara to Sub-Saharan Africa. Since Algerian independence, the city has witnessed much growth due to infrastructure, social, and housing projects.

== Geography ==
Adrar lies at an elevation of 258 metres (846 ft) above sea level. A large oasis lies to the southwest of the town; this oasis lies in the Tuat region, a string of oases running from Bouda in the north to Reggane in the south. A vast area of sand dunes, the Erg Chech, lies to the west, while a large rocky plateau, the Tademaït, lies to the east.

=== Climate ===
Adrar has a hot desert climate (Köppen climate classification BWh), with severely long and hot summers and short, mild winters, and averages just 15 millimetres (0.59 in) of rainfall per year. Summer temperatures are consistently high as they commonly approach 46 °C (114 °F). Temperatures at night are still hot at around 27 °C (81 °F). Even in early May or in late August, daytime temperatures can rise to 48 °C (118 °F). Winter nights can be chilly and frost is by no means unknown but the days are pleasantly warm, sunny and dry. During the summer, the Sahara region of Algeria is the source of a scorching, sometimes dusty and southerly wind called the Sirocco. These winds parch the plateaus of northern Algeria up to 40 days and reach the Tell coastal region for as many as 20 days.

Climate data for Adrar (1991-2020)
Month	Jan	Feb	Mar	Apr	May	Jun	Jul	Aug	Sep	Oct	Nov	Dec	Year
Record high °C (°F)	31.2 (88.2)	39.1 (102.4)	40.7 (105.3)	43.8 (110.8)	49.8 (121.6)	49.4 (120.9)	51.0 (123.8)	49.8 (121.6)	47.3 (117.1)	43.7 (110.7)	37.2 (99.0)	33.5 (92.3)	51.0 (123.8)
Mean daily maximum °C (°F)	20.6 (69.1)	24.5 (76.1)	28.0 (82.4)	32.1 (89.8)	36.7 (98.1)	42.5 (108.5)	45.0 (113.0)	44.3 (111.7)	40.0 (104.0)	33.1 (91.6)	26.1 (79.0)	20.9 (69.6)	32.8 (91.0)
Daily mean °C (°F)	13.1 (55.6)	15.9 (60.6)	20.3 (68.5)	25.1 (77.2)	29.8 (85.6)	34.5 (94.1)	37.6 (99.7)	36.7 (98.1)	33.1 (91.6)	26.6 (79.9)	19.0 (66.2)	14.2 (57.6)	25.5 (77.9)
Mean daily minimum °C (°F)	4.1 (39.4)	7.5 (45.5)	10.7 (51.3)	15.1 (59.2)	19.4 (66.9)	24.7 (76.5)	26.9 (80.4)	26.6 (79.9)	23.2 (73.8)	16.8 (62.2)	10.2 (50.4)	4.9 (40.8)	15.8 (60.4)
Record low °C (°F)	−4.2 (24.4)	−2.0 (28.4)	0.5 (32.9)	4.8 (40.6)	8.9 (48.0)	15.2 (59.4)	18.2 (64.8)	20.0 (68.0)	15.2 (59.4)	6.0 (42.8)	−1.5 (29.3)	−4.1 (24.6)	−4.2 (24.4)
Average precipitation mm (inches)	2.1 (0.08)	1.5 (0.06)	1.1 (0.04)	2.3 (0.09)	1.0 (0.04)	0.3 (0.01)	0.1 (0.00)	1.2 (0.05)	2.9 (0.11)	2.1 (0.08)	1.4 (0.06)	0.7 (0.03)	16.7 (0.66)
Average precipitation days (≥ 1.0 mm)	0.4	0.3	0.3	0.3	0.2	0.1	0.1	0.3	0.5	0.4	0.4	0.1	3.4
Average relative humidity (%)	52	52	40	34	30	28	26	29	36	48	59	57	42
Mean monthly sunshine hours	274.8	257.4	289.4	299.0	320.0	321.3	316.6	294.3	257.3	273.0	263.0	264.8	3,430.9
Mean daily sunshine hours	8.7	9.1	10.0	10.6	10.5	11.1	11.1	10.6	9.6	9.0	8.7	8.5	9.8
Source 1: NOAA (daily max-min temperature 1961-1990)
Source 2: Deutscher Wetterdienst (extremes, humidity and daily sun)

== Culture ==
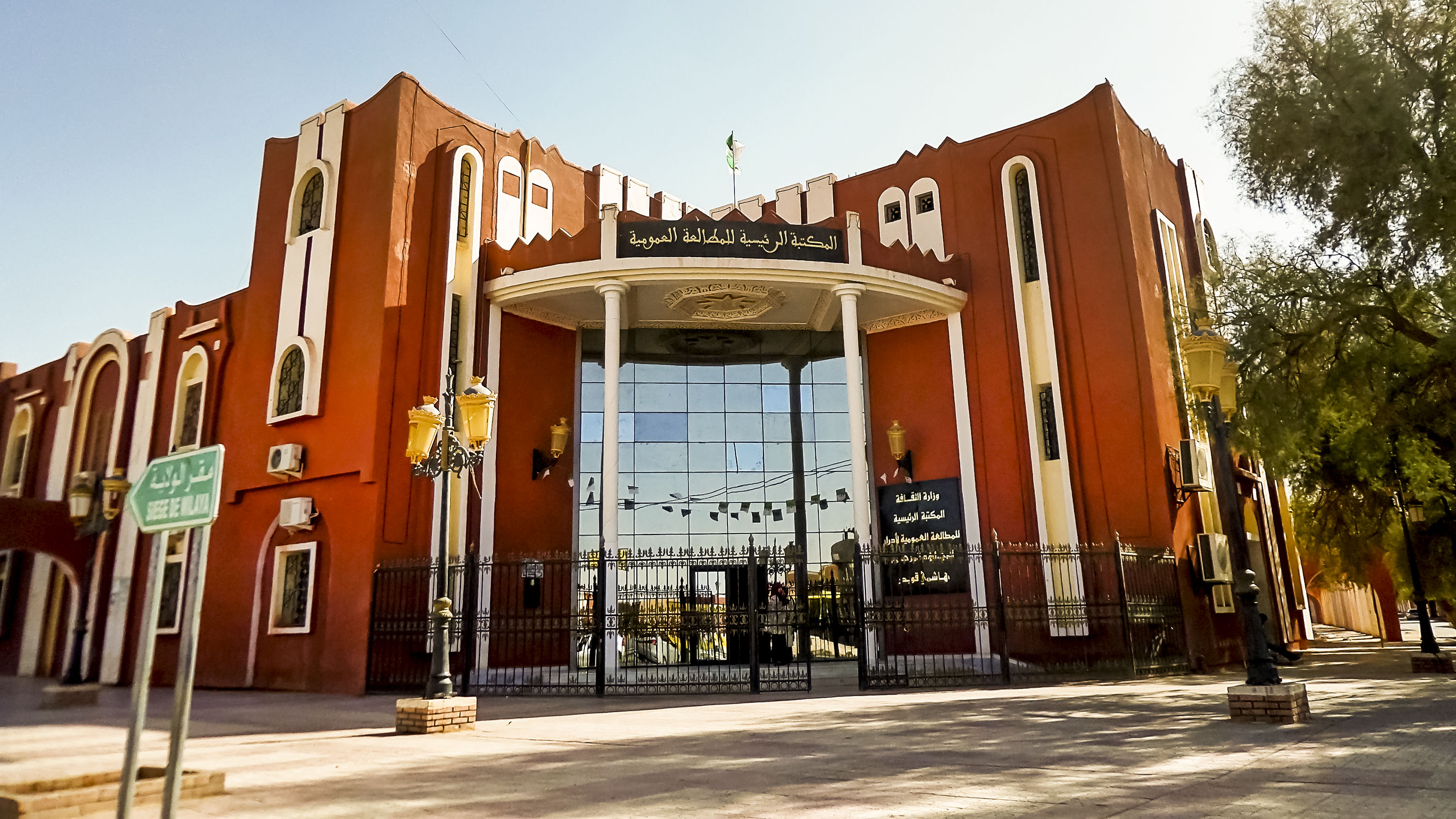
Adrar public library

The settlement in the region (also known as Touat) is quite ancient and the area provides for several different cultures and includes several historic monuments. This intermingling gave birth to a body of traditions and of cultural and hand-crafted practices that are still present today in the life of its inhabitants, translating into a wealth of the folklore and cultural heritage.

== Transportation ==
Touat Cheikh Sidi Mohamed Belkebir Airport (or simply Adrar Airport) is located 10 kilometers away from center of the city. Airlines include Air Algérie flight to Algiers, Bordj Badji Mokhtar, Oran and Ouargla in addition to Tassili Airlines flights to In Aménas.

Adrar is on the N6 national highway, which leads north to Béchar and south to Reggane and Timiaouine.

== Demographics ==
Year	Population
1936	800
1966	13,300
1987	28,600
1998	43,903
2008	64,781

== Education ==
9.2% of the population has a tertiary education, and another 19.8% has completed secondary education. The overall literacy rate is 84.1%, and is 89.9% among males and 78.1% among females (the second highest among all the communes in the province). The University of Adrar is located in the city. Adrar joined the UNESCO Global Network of Learning Cities in 2020.

== Nuclear testing ==
Adrar was the site of one of the In Ekker series, French nuclear tests during the 1960s.

== Localities ==
As of 1984, the commune was composed of the following eight localities:

- Adrar
- Adgha
- Ouguedim
- Barbaa
- Ouled Oungal
- Ouled Ouchen
- Ouled Ali
- Tililane
- Meraguen
