= Touat =

Coordinates: 27°20′00″N 0°13′00″W

Touat Tuwat
- Natural region
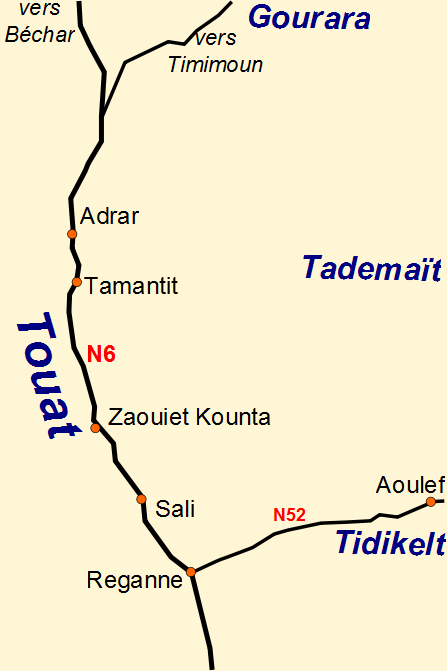
- Towns in the Touat Region

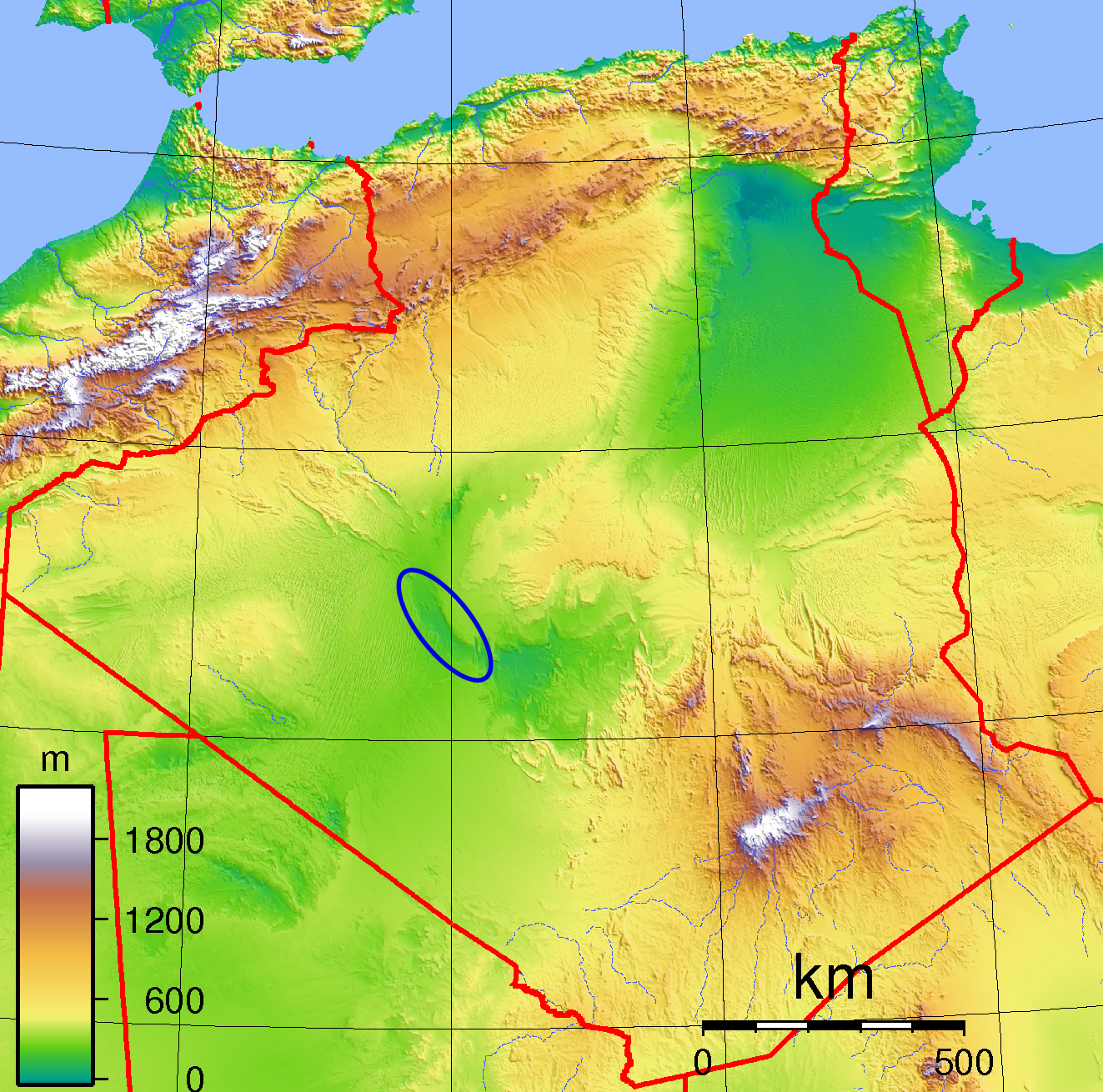
- Topographic map of Algeria with the location of the Touat region.
- Country: Algeria
- Elevation: 260 m (850 ft)

Location of Tuat in Algeria. Reggane lies at the southern boundary of the region while Adrar is near the northern boundary.

Tuat, or Touat (Arabic: توات, romanized: Tuwāt), is a natural region of desert in central Algeria that contains a string of small oases. In the past, the oases were important for caravans crossing the Sahara.

== Geography ==
Tuat lies to the south of the Grand Erg Occidental, to the east of the Erg Chech and to the south west of the Tademaït plateau. It contains a string of small oases strung out along the eastern edge of the Wadi Messaoud, a continuation of the Wadi Saoura. The oases extend over a distance of 160 kilometres (99 mi) from the district of Bouda in the north to Reggane in the south. The largest town in the region is Adrar, 20 km (12 mi) southeast of Bouda. Adrar was established by the French after their conquest in 1900 and had a population of 43,903 in 2002. Associated with each oasis are small walled villages called ksour (singular ksar or gsar). There are also some forts (kasbahs), most of them abandoned.

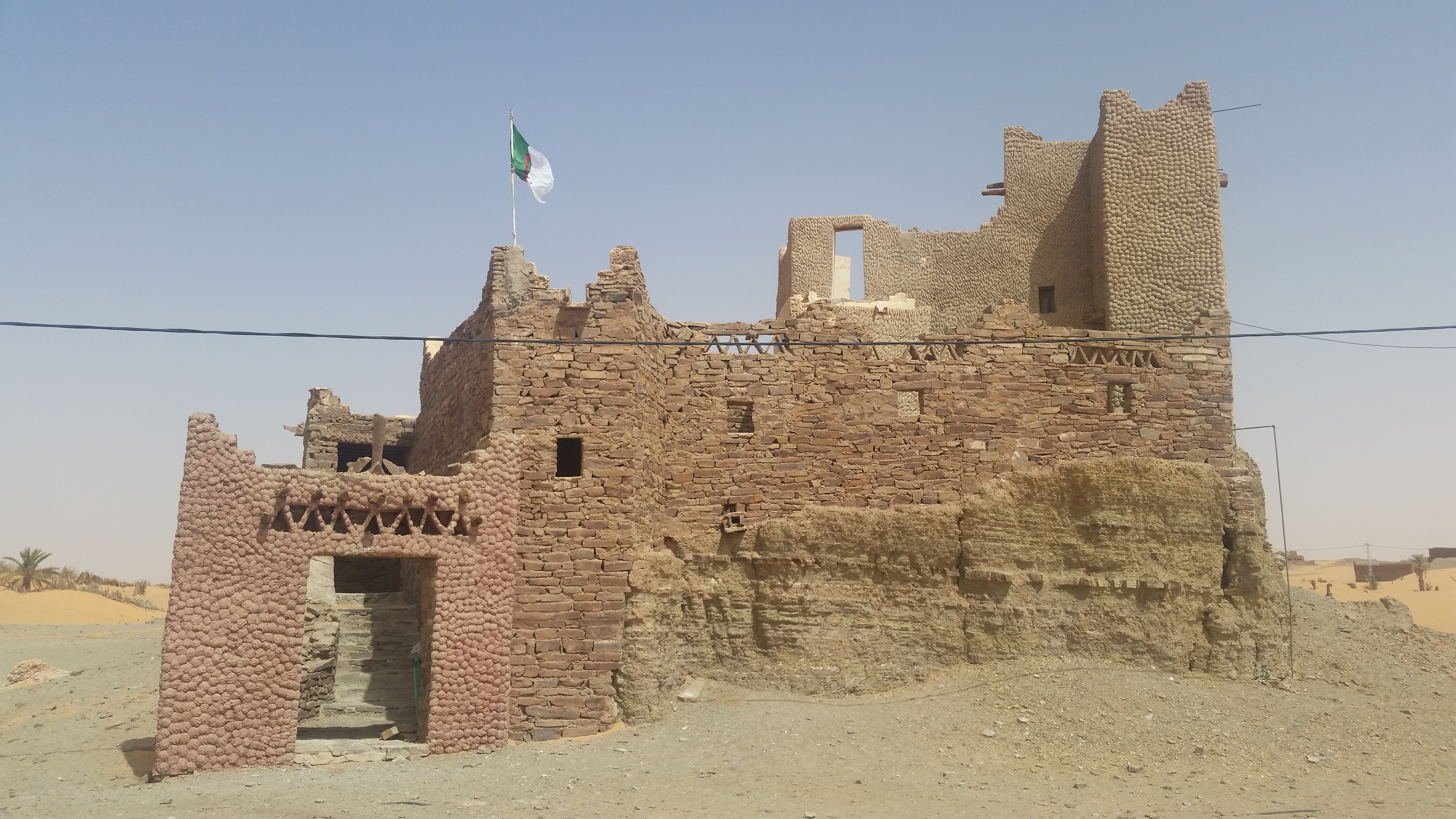
Ksar in Timimoune

As almost no rain falls in the region, agriculture depends on groundwater supplied by an enormous aquifer in the Continental intercalaire, a layer of porous sandstone deposited between the Moscovian and the Cenomanian periods that extends over 600,000 km^{2} (230,000 sq mi), an area that includes parts of Algeria, Libya and Tunisia. It forms the deeper of the two aquifers of the North Western Sahara Aquifer System (NWSAS). Tuat is situated at the southwestern boundary of the Continental Intercalary where the aquifer lies only 2–6 m (7–20 ft) below the surface.

The oases contain 700,000–800,000 date palms (Phoenix dactylifera) in an area of 4,500 hectares (17 sq mi). The palm groves are irrigated by a system of foggaras, traditional gravity catchment systems which consist of a tunnel constructed with a gentle uphill gradient from the low ground near the wadi into the aquifer under the nearby higher ground. Vertical access holes every 10–20 m (33–66 ft) along the tunnel provide ventilation and facilitate construction and maintenance. Many of the foggaras are over 1 km (0.6 mi) in length. They typically provide flow rates of 2–3 litres (0.44–0.66 imp gal; 0.53–0.79 US gal) per second. In 1963, the region of Tuat contained 531 foggaras, of which only 358 were functioning. The total combined flow rate was approximately 2,000 L (440 imp gal; 530 US gal) per second. Foggaras are expensive to construct and to maintain. As they collapse they are often not repaired. Instead, water is obtained from vertical wells and electric pumps allowing grain to be grown using a center pivot irrigation system. A single well can provide 30–50 litres (6.6–11.0 imp gal; 7.9–13.2 US gal) per second of water.

In addition to water, the rock beneath Tuat contains pockets of natural gas. Sonatrach, the Algeria state-owned oil company, collaborates with foreign companies in joint ventures to exploit these gas reserves. Sonatrach and the China National Oil & Gas Exploration & Development Corporation (CNODC) have constructed a refinery near the village of Sbaa, 40 km (25 mi) north of Adrar. This refinery began operating in 2006. Separate projects led by Gaz de France (GDF Suez) and Total are both scheduled to start supplying gas in 2013. A pipeline is being built to connect to Hassi R'Mel.

To the north of Tuat is Gourara, a similar region also containing oases with date palms irrigated by foggaras. The largest town, Timimoun, is 162 km (101 mi) northeast of Adrar.

== History ==
Saad asserts that Tuat may have been founded by the Malinke of the Mali Empire, based on information from Timbuktu traditionalists and the fact that Tuat always had settlers representing him in Timbuktu.

The Tuat oases were important in the trans-Saharan trade because of their location at the northern end of the Tanezrouft route. Reggane is around 1150 km north of the town of Gao and a similar distance from Timbuktu. Caravans from the Sudan would continue northwards to towns such as Sijilmasa or Tlemcen. Tuat was a key stopping point on one of the major routes of the trans-Saharan slave trade which brought enslaved people from sub-Saharan Africa via Timbuktu.

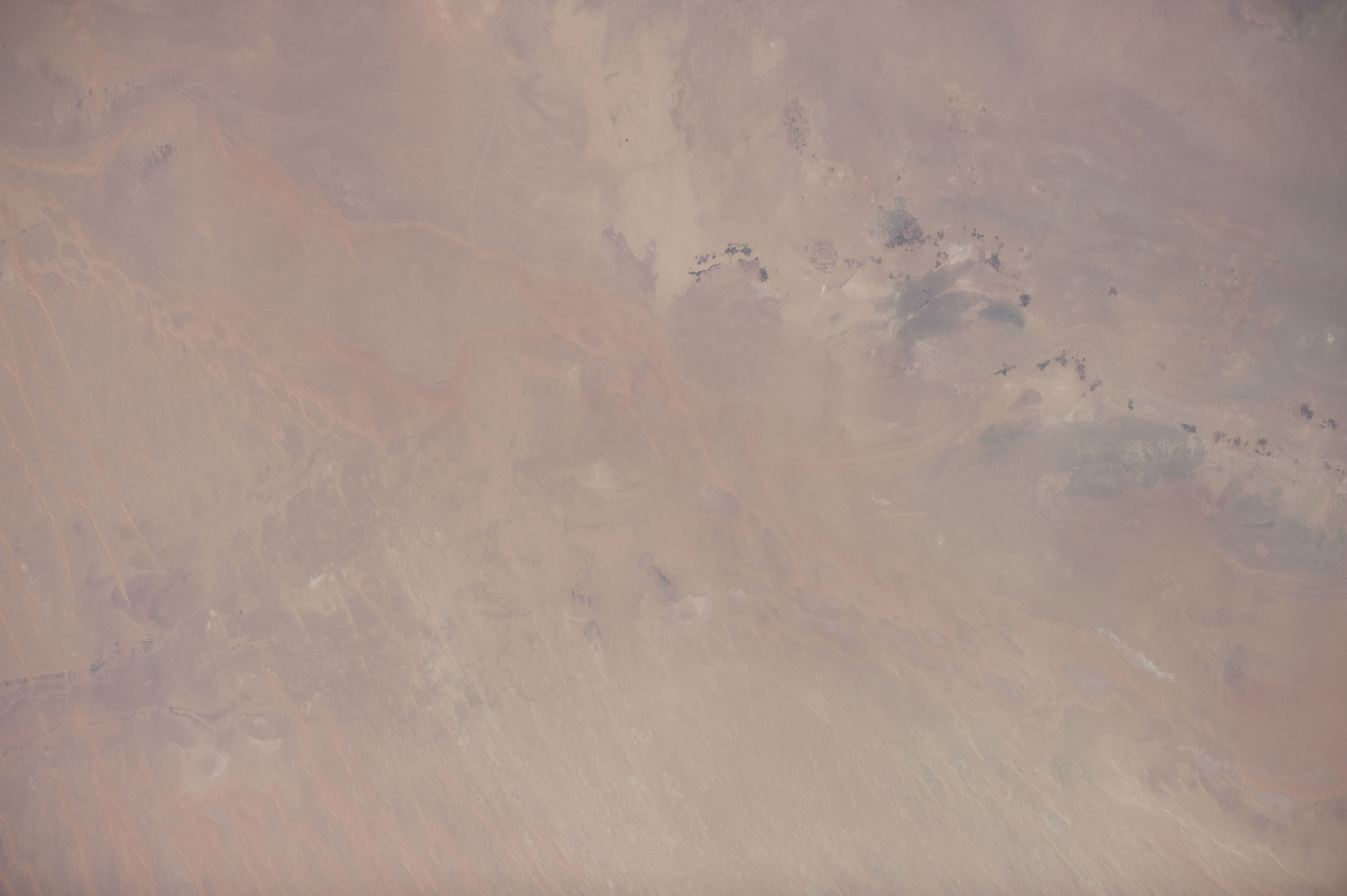
Satellite photo of the region, with oases at right

In antiquity Touat was inhabited by Numidian Berber tribes, the Zenata, Wanziqa, Tarq (Tuareg) and the Lamtuna. The inhabitants of Touat can be traced back to the Gaetuli, who were the first to inhabit the region, this is supported by archaeological studies in the Tassili and Ahaggar regions.

In the early Middle Ages, Touat was subjected to the Rustamid state and paid taxes to it. It would be occupied by the Fatimids in 958 during the capture of Sijilmasa, who would establish a ksar by the name of "Tin Ziri", which would then be passed onto the Zirids after the Fatimids moved their capital to Cairo. the Zirids found it difficult to defend the ksar, mostly due to the distance. The ksar would be destroyed by the Maghrawa.

The oases are not mentioned by any of the early Arabic geographers, but it appears that Jews lived in the oases at an early date as a tombstone discovered in a village of the Bouda region has an inscription in Hebrew with a date of 1329.

The earliest written reference to Tuat is by Ibn Battuta. He visited Bouda in 1353 after crossing the Sahara from Takedda in present-day Niger, a distance of 1390 km. He travelled with a large caravan that included 600 slave girls. He wrote:

"Then we arrived at Būda, which is one of the biggest villages of the Tuwāt. Its land consists of sand and salt pans. It has many dates which are not good, but its people prefer them to the dates of Sijilmāsa. There is no cultivation there nor butter nor oil. Oil is only imported to it from the land of the Maghrib. The food of its people is dates and locusts. These are abundant with them; they store them as dates are stored and use them for food. They go out to hunt them before sunrise, for at that time they do not fly on account of the cold."

Ibn Battuta stayed in Bouda for a few days and then continued on to Sijilmasa with a caravan.

Bouda, as well as Sijilmasa, Timbuktu and Gao, are marked on the 1375 Catalan Atlas of Abraham Cresques. At some point Bouda was abandoned and replaced by Tamentit as the main ksour of the region. Tamentit was more centrally situated and perhaps easier to defend. The Arabic geographer and historian Ibn Khaldun (born Tunis 1332, died Egypt 1406) provides a description of Tuat, a place he had not visited himself, in his Kitab al-ibar:

One of their homelands lies three stages to the south of Sijilmāsa and is called Tuwāt. It consists of 200 qușūr strung out from west to east, of which the most easterly is called Tamanțīt, nowadays a flourishing place and a point of departure for merchants who pass to and fro between the Maghrib and the land of Māli of the Sūdān. ... The town of Būdā, the most westerly of these qușūr, used to be the point of departure for Wālātan, the outpost of the Mālī territory, but it was abandoned when the bedouin Arabs from the desert of the Sūs took to acts of brigandry on the highway and molesting the caravans. They left that place and followed the route to the land of the Sudān by way of Tamanțīt.

Note that in reality Adrar is 540 km southeast of Sijilmasa, considerably more than the three stages mentioned by Ibn Khaldun. Also, the oases are strung out from north-northwest to south-southeast rather than from west to east.

We learn more about Tuat from a letter written in Latin in 1447 by the Italian Antonio Malfante from 'Tueto' to a merchant in Genoa. Malfante describes a village which is believed to have been Tamentit: "This locality is a mart of the country of the Moors, to which merchants come to sell their goods: gold is carried hither, and bought by those who come up from the coast. This place is De Amament [Tamentit], and there are many rich men here. The generality, however, are very poor, for they do not sow, nor do they harvest anything, save the dates upon which they subsist. They eat no meat but that of castrated camels, which are scarce and very dear." He also comments on the Jewish population: "There are many Jews, who lead a good life here, for they are under the protection of the several rulers, each of whom defends his own clients. Thus they enjoy very secure social standing. Trade is in their hands, and many of them are to be trusted with the greatest confidence."

The Sultan of the Ziyyanid dynasty of Tlemcen, Abu Hammu II (1359–1389) took refuge in the Gourara region where he was well received. The sultan stayed there a while before reconquering Tlemcen from the Merinids in a ksar near a sebkha in Timimoun (dubbed «Capital of the Gourara»). The ksar in question still bears the sultan's name, Tal n Hammu. Through tribal alliances, the Ziyyanids had a certain influence over the Touat.

From the start of the 15th century, political relations between the region were established with the Kingdom of Tlemcen. According to a Touati source, quoted by Alfred Georges Paul Martin, a French officer of the Legion of Honour, a text written by a certain al-Amuri recites a conflict in 1435 opposing a group of nomads (Ouled Ali Ibn Hariz) and the Jews of Tamantit. The nomads bought some dates on credit and refused to pay for them, the Jews of Tamantit called upon the sultan of Tlemcen, Abū l-‘Abbās Aḥmad al-‘Akil (1430-1466), the sultan sent a small expedition to end the conflict.

Around 1490, encouraged by Muhammad al-Maghili, a Maliki scholar from Tlemcen, the Moslem population of Tamentit destroyed the Jewish synagogue and forced the Jews to move elsewhere.

=== Early modern period ===
The Touat region was independently ruled by the caïd Amor ben Ahmed Et-Tamentiti following his victory over a Saadian invasion in the Battle of Kaberten. Another attempt was made to subdue the area by Saadian forces which led to intervention by the Regency of Algiers who defeated the invading forces in a 1557 expedition. The people of Touat refused to be annexed to the Saadi sultanate of Morocco, they rejected and resisted their attempts to establish rule over the region. The inhabitants of Touat preferred to maintain their autonomy and a moral connection with the Regency of Algiers, the region always found itself more connected to the northern regions of Algeria without any coercion or force.

Following the expeditions of the tribes of Tafilalt in the Tuat region in 1578, the dignitaries of the oasis implored the intervention of the Beylerbey of Algiers. The invading tribes from the Tafilalt did not leave until the Algerian forces intervened. The Tuat-Gourara called upon the Beylerbey of Algiers since Tlemcen had been annexed by the Regency of Algiers. The Ottomans made visits to Tuat in 1578, by the Turks of Algiers, and 1582, by the Turks of Tripoli whereby Jaafar Pasha sent his son to Touat for a scientific visit accompanied by ten scholars. Sometime between 1583 and 1588 the forces of the Moroccan Saadi Sultan Ahmad al-Mansur took control of the Tuat and the Gourara oases. The Moroccan conquest of Tuat stopped Ottoman expansion into the Sahara, which had started with the occupation of the oasis of Ouargla in 1552 and the Fezzan in 1574, and secured the Moroccan advance toward the south. The area remained politically dependent upon Morocco but the sovereignty of the Alawite sultans became almost nominal. Following the 1579 Algerian expedition, the tribes also continued to pay tribute to Hassan Veneziano and the rest of the Algerian Deys until the fall of the Regency of Algiers in 1830.

The Alawite Sultan of Tafilalt, Sidi Muhammed ibn Sharif embarked on an eastern Saharan expedition and conquered Tuat first in 1645 and again in 1652, at which point he assigned his qaids to the oasis, who was then accepted as suzerain as far east as Aougrout. Beginning in 1692, during the reign of Sultan Moulay Ismail, and for one hundred years after, Gourara-Tuat-Tidikelt was administered by a succession of Moroccan governors. Faced with constant rebellion throughout his empire, Sultan Moulay Slimane recalled his governor from Gourara-Tuat-Tidikelt in 1796.

Before 1830, the inhabitants of Touat paid tax to the Deys of Algiers. Moroccan influence was patchy, the region was internally autonomous from 1795 until 1892 and paid no taxes. Precolonial local sources have no mention of any government representatives from Morocco such as quyyad, neither do they mention the Moroccan sultan. This was also the case when the Touat region had an increased legalisation of local affairs, no mention of Moroccan government representatives were made but instead the people in fact deplored the absence of state authority. It was only until the 19th century that a Moroccan qayyid appeared in the Touat most likely to counter the threat of the French.

=== Late modern period ===
In 1800, the Tuat population agreed to pay taxes when Moulay Slimane granted them local autonomy, preferring to entrust the administration of their territory to a local council of notables. Prior to 1830, the Tuat population paid tribute to the Dey of Algiers, but stopped during the Algerian wars. Prior to 1890, the Saharan oases were a part of what was known as the bled es-siba, regions that were nominally Moroccan but which had not submitted to the authority of the central government. Sultan Moulay Hassan decided to reinstate the old Moroccan administration in Gourara-Tuat-Tidikelt. The first Moroccan envoys reached the Saharan oases in 1889 and in 1890. In 1891 Moulay Hassan called on the oasis peoples to begin paying taxes, thus formalizing the recognition of his suzerainty. That same year the Tuat and the oases which lay along the Oued Saoura were placed under the authority of the son of the Moroccan khalifa, who resided in the Tafilalt. Then, in 1892, a complete administrative organization was established in all of the Gourara-Tuat-Tidikelt.

In the 1890s, the French administration and military called for the annexation of the Tuat, the Gourara and the Tidikelt, a complex that had been part of the Moroccan Empire for many centuries prior to the arrival of the French in Algeria. According to Alfred Le Chatelier, French soldier, ceramicist and Islamologist, Tuat, at any moment of history, had not been an integral part of Morocco. The inhabitants never depended from them more than a few years. On every occasion they would affirm their independence and free themselves of any religious vassalage. In 1893, the French government authorized Jules Cambon to occupy the Gourara and the Tidikelt, letting him go so far as to gather his forces at El Golea, then only rescinded the order at the very last moment when his troops were about to depart. The actual intervention in the Gourara-Tuat-Tidikelt did not take place until the very end of 1899. The military contingent escorting the mission quickly routed the Saharans and took advantage of the opportunity to occupy the oasis of In Salah.

An armed conflict opposed the French 19th Corps Oran and Algiers divisions to the Aït Khabbash, a faction of the Aït Ounbgui khams of the Aït Atta confederation. The conflict ended by the annexation of the Touat-Gourara-Tidikelt complex to Algeria by France in 1901.

Under French rule, the area was known as the "Territoire des oasis sahariennes". During 1903, attacks on the lines of communication by local tribes caused the French troops to suffer serious losses. To punish the tribes the town of Figuig was bombarded by the French on 8 June. On the following 2 September a band of nomads attacked the escort of a convoy going to Taghit at a place called El Mungar. After maintaining the fight for over seven hours the French were reinforced and their attackers drew off. Out of 115 combatants the French lost 38 killed and 47 wounded. To consolidate their position the French authorities determined to connect the oases with the Algerian Sahara proper by carriage roads and railways.

== See also ==
- Taznatit language
- Tidikelt language
