= Taghouzi =

- Location within Algeria
- Coordinates: 29.415°N 0.40386°W
- Country: Algeria
- Province: Timimoun Province
- District: Charouine District
- Commune: Talmine

Taghouzi is a populated place in the commune of Talmine, in Charouine District, Timimoun Province, Algeria. It lies to the west of Timimoun, on the southern edge of the Grand Erg Occidental desert.

The oasis lies on the northern edge of the Gourara region. Winds are typically from the east and northeast. The climate is generally very hot and dry, with a short cold season. There is little rain, but that comes in the form of torrential downpours. Date palms are planted in hollows where they can reach the underground aquifer.

The people speak Arabic. They live in ksours, fortified houses made of red or ochre earth. The Gourara people of Taghousi will travel 40 kilometres (25 mi) or more to Zaouiat al-Hajj Bilqasim to celebrate mawlid.
