= Ouled Aissa, Timimoun =

Ouled Aissa وﻻد ﻋﻴﺴﻰ
- Town and commune
- Location of Ouled Aissa commune within Adrar Province

- Location of Ouled Aissa within Algeria
- Coordinates: 29°25′30″N 0°5′21″W
- Country: Algeria
- Province: Timimoun
- District: Charouine

Area
  - Total: 4,030 km^{2} (1,560 sq mi)
- Elevation: 356 m (1,168 ft)

Population (2008)
  - Total: 7,034
- Time zone: UTC+1 (CET)

Ouled Aissa (Arabic: اﻟﻄﺎرﻓﺔ) (also written Ouled Aïssa) is a town and commune in Charouine District, Timimoun Province, in south-central Algeria. According to the 2008 census it has a population of 7,034, up from 5,497 in 1998, with an annual growth rate of 2.5%.

== Geography ==
Ouled Aissa commune lies at an elevation of about 356 metres (1,168 ft) in the Gourara region of northern Timimoun Province. The commune consists of several villages (including the town of Ouled Aissa) that populate small oases between Talmine commune to the west and Ksar Kaddour and Ouled Said communes to the east. The oases mainly lie at the northern edge of the habitable Gourara region just south of the Grand Erg Occidental, a large area of sand dunes stretching well into Béchar and El Bayadh provinces.

== Climate ==
Ouled Aissa has a hot desert climate (Köppen climate classification BWh), with extremely hot summers and mild winters, and very little precipitation throughout the year.

Climate data for Ouled Aissa
Month	Jan	Feb	Mar	Apr	May	Jun	Jul	Aug	Sep	Oct	Nov	Dec	Year
Mean daily maximum °C (°F)	18.7 (65.7)	21.6 (70.9)	26.4 (79.5)	31.5 (88.7)	35.5 (95.9)	41.5 (106.7)	44.9 (112.8)	43.7 (110.7)	39.1 (102.4)	31.8 (89.2)	24.3 (75.7)	19.3 (66.7)	31.5 (88.7)
Daily mean °C (°F)	11.4 (52.5)	14.0 (57.2)	18.4 (65.1)	23.4 (74.1)	27.4 (81.3)	32.9 (91.2)	36.3 (97.3)	35.4 (95.7)	31.3 (88.3)	24.6 (76.3)	17.5 (63.5)	12.5 (54.5)	23.8 (74.7)
Mean daily minimum °C (°F)	4.2 (39.6)	6.5 (43.7)	10.5 (50.9)	15.3 (59.5)	19.3 (66.7)	24.4 (75.9)	27.7 (81.9)	27.1 (80.8)	23.6 (74.5)	17.4 (63.3)	10.8 (51.4)	5.8 (42.4)	16.1 (60.9)
Average precipitation mm (inches)	1 (0.0)	3 (0.1)	4 (0.2)	1 (0.0)	1 (0.0)	0 (0)	0 (0)	1 (0.0)	1 (0.0)	3 (0.1)	3 (0.1)	2 (0.1)	20 (0.6)
Source: climate-data.org

== Transportation ==
The main road through the commune is a provincial road that starts at the village of Taouennza, passes through Haiha, Yako and Ouled Aissa town before connecting to the N51 national highway northeast of Charouine. A local road branches off south of Ouled Aissa town connecting to Djimjane.

== Education ==
3.2% of the population has a tertiary education, and another 7.3% has completed secondary education. The overall literacy rate is 63.7%, and is 81.0% among males and 45.5% among females.

== Localities ==
As of 1984, the commune was composed of nine localities:

- Ouled Aïssa
- Tasfaout
- Guentour
- Djimjane
- Taouennza
- Haïha
- Yako
- El Kort
- Lahmer
