= Deldoul, Timimoun =

Deldoul دﻟﺪول
- Commune
- Location of Deldoul commune within Adrar Province

- Location of Deldoul in Algeria
- Coordinates: 28°1′N 0°26′W
- Country: Algeria
- Province: Timimoun
- District: Aougrout
- Elevation: 243 m (797 ft)

Population (2008)
  - Total: 8,647
- Time zone: UTC+1 (CET)

Deldoul (Arabic: دﻟﺪول) is a commune in Aougrout District, Timimoun Province, in south-central Algeria. According to the 2008 census it has a population of 8,647, up from 7,465 in 1998, with an annual growth rate of 1.5%.

== Geography ==
Deldoul commune is centered on a set of oases in the south-central Gourara region of northern Adrar Province, southwest of Timimoun, southeast of Charouine, west of Aougrout and northeast of Metarfa. The surrounding areas generally consist of rocky plains mixed with low sand dunes.

== Climate ==
Deldoul has a hot desert climate (Köppen climate classification BWh), with extremely hot summers and mild winters, and very little precipitation throughout the year.

== Transportation ==
A road connects the main villages in the commune from Bel Rhazi in the north to Ouled Abbou in the south. The main road out of the area leads east from Ouled Abbou to Aougrout.

== Education ==
3.3% of the population has a tertiary education, and another 10.8% has completed secondary education. The overall literacy rate is 74.4%, and is 88.3% among males and 60.6% among females.

== Localities ==
As of 1984, the commune was composed of 11 localities:

- Ouled Abbou
- Aourir
- Akbour
- El Mansour
- El Hadbane
- Igosten
- El Barka
- Toukki
- Ouled Abd Es Semod
- Belrhazi
- Sahla
