= Oufrane =

- Village
- Location within Algeria
- Coordinates: 28°32′29″N 0°10′59″E
- Country: Algeria
- Province: Adrar Province
- District: Aougrout District
- Commune: Metarfa
- Elevation: 290 m (950 ft)
- Time zone: UTC+1 (CET)

Oufrane is a village in the commune of Metarfa, in Aougrout District, Adrar Province, Algeria. It is located 87 kilometres (54 mi) northeast of Adrar and 79 kilometres (49 mi) south of Timimoun.

== Climate ==
Oufrane has a hot desert climate (Köppen climate classification BWh), with extremely hot summers and mild winters, and very little precipitation throughout the year.

Climate data for Oufrane
| Month | Jan | Feb | Mar | Apr | May | Jun | Jul | Aug | Sep | Oct | Nov | Dec | Year |
|---|---|---|---|---|---|---|---|---|---|---|---|---|---|
| Mean daily maximum °C (°F) | 19.8 (67.6) | 22.5 (72.5) | 27.3 (81.1) | 32.4 (90.3) | 36.3 (97.3) | 42.5 (108.5) | 45.4 (113.7) | 44.1 (111.4) | 40.0 (104.0) | 32.8 (91.0) | 25.1 (77.2) | 18.4 (65.1) | 32.2 (90.0) |
| Daily mean °C (°F) | 12.1 (53.8) | 14.7 (58.5) | 19.0 (66.2) | 24.1 (75.4) | 28.0 (82.4) | 33.8 (92.8) | 36.7 (98.1) | 35.7 (96.3) | 32.0 (89.6) | 25.2 (77.4) | 18.0 (64.4) | 12.1 (53.8) | 24.3 (75.7) |
| Mean daily minimum °C (°F) | 4.4 (39.9) | 6.9 (44.4) | 10.8 (51.4) | 15.8 (60.4) | 19.7 (67.5) | 25.2 (77.4) | 28.0 (82.4) | 27.3 (81.1) | 24.1 (75.4) | 17.7 (63.9) | 11.0 (51.8) | 5.9 (42.6) | 16.4 (61.5) |
| Average precipitation mm (inches) | 1 (0.0) | 2 (0.1) | 3 (0.1) | 1 (0.0) | 0 (0) | 0 (0) | 0 (0) | 0 (0) | 1 (0.0) | 2 (0.1) | 2 (0.1) | 2 (0.1) | 14 (0.5) |
Source: climate-data.org
