= Grand Erg Occidental =

Erg in Algeria

Grand Erg Occidental العرق الغربي الكبير
- Erg
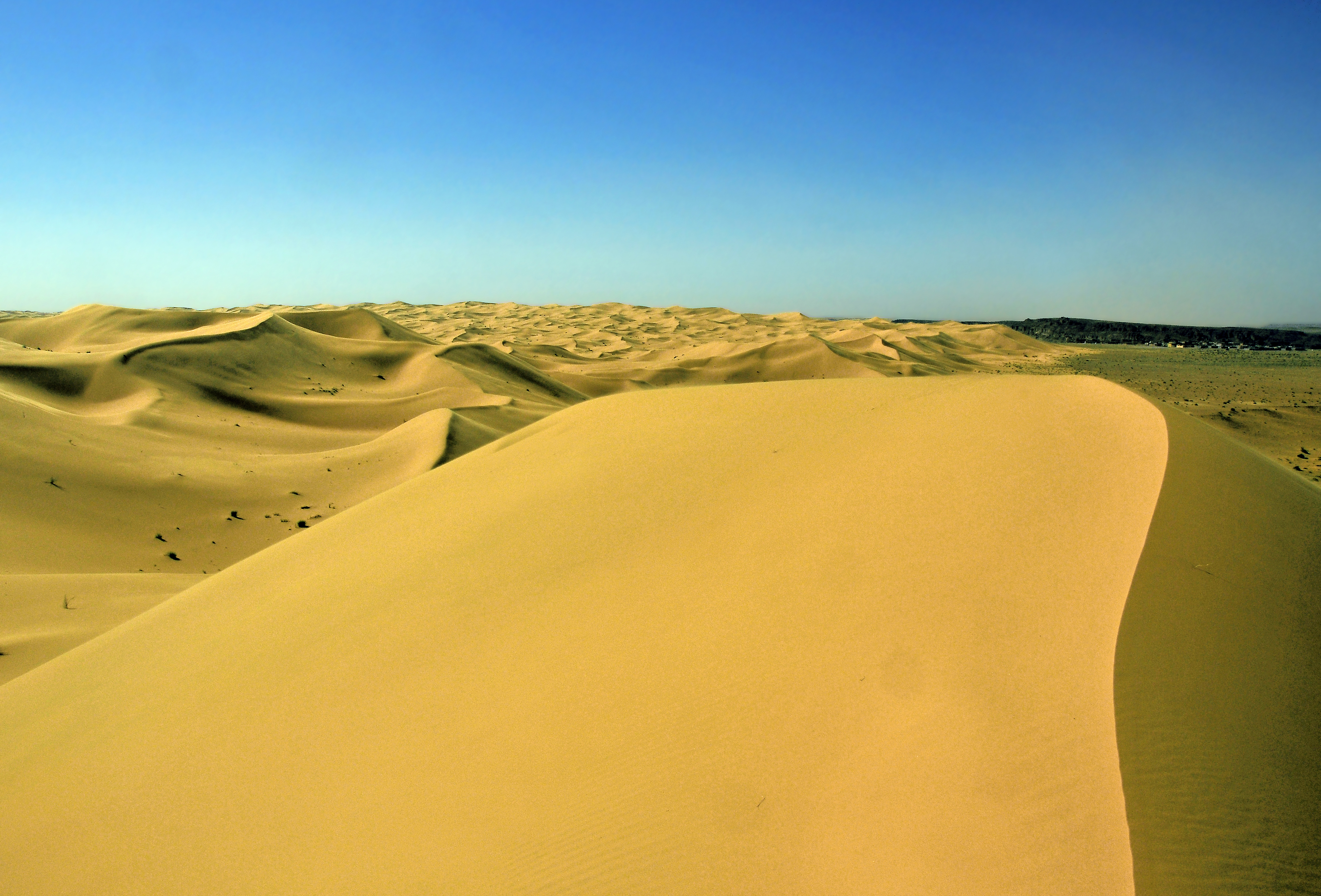
- The landscape of the Grand Erg Occidental east of Taghit

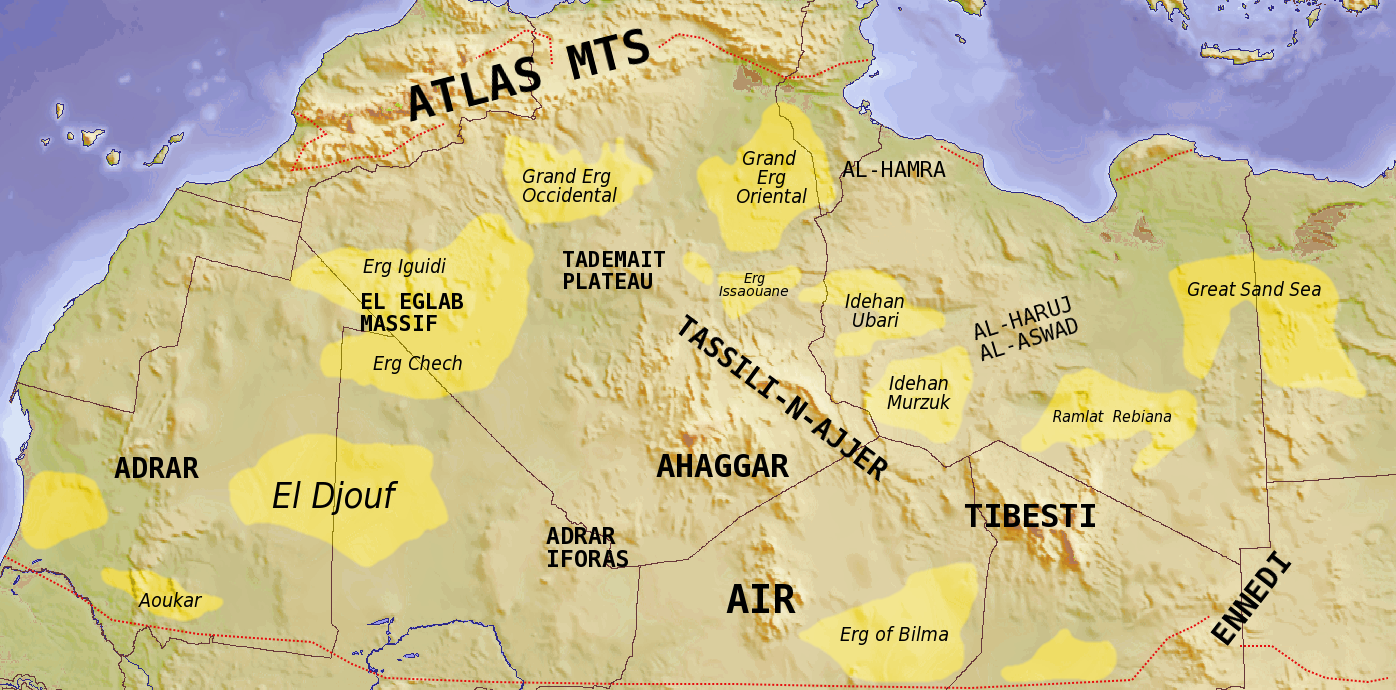
- Major Saharan topography, showing the Grand Erg Occidental in yellow at top center, left.
- Coordinates: 30°31′N 0°32′E
- Country: Algeria

Area
  - Total: 75,000 km^{2} (29,000 sq mi)

Dimensions
  - Length: 550 km (340 mi)
  - Width: 340 km (210 mi)
- Elevation: 720 m (2,360 ft)

Population
  - Total: 45,000
  - Density: 0.60/km^{2} (1.6/sq mi)
- (Estimation)

The Grand Erg Occidental, (also known as the Western Sand Sea), Arabic العرق الغربي الكبير (al-ʿIrq al-Ḡarbī al-Kabīr), is an erg in the northern center of the Algerian Sahara. It is the third largest erg in Algeria after the Erg Chech and the Grand Erg Oriental.

== Geography ==
The Grand Erg Occidental borders the Hamada Bet Touadjine and the Monts des Ksour of the Saharan Atlas to the south. To the west, it is adjacent to the Hamada du Guir, to the south to the Tademait Plateau, and to the east to the Chebka du Mzab. It extends approximately 550 km from east to west and 340 km from north to south, covering an area of approximately 75,000 km². The erg is roughly bordered in the west by National Road (RN) 6 and the Oued Saoura, in the north by RN6B, in the east by RN107, and in the south by RN1 and RN51. It is crossed in a north-south direction by RN118.

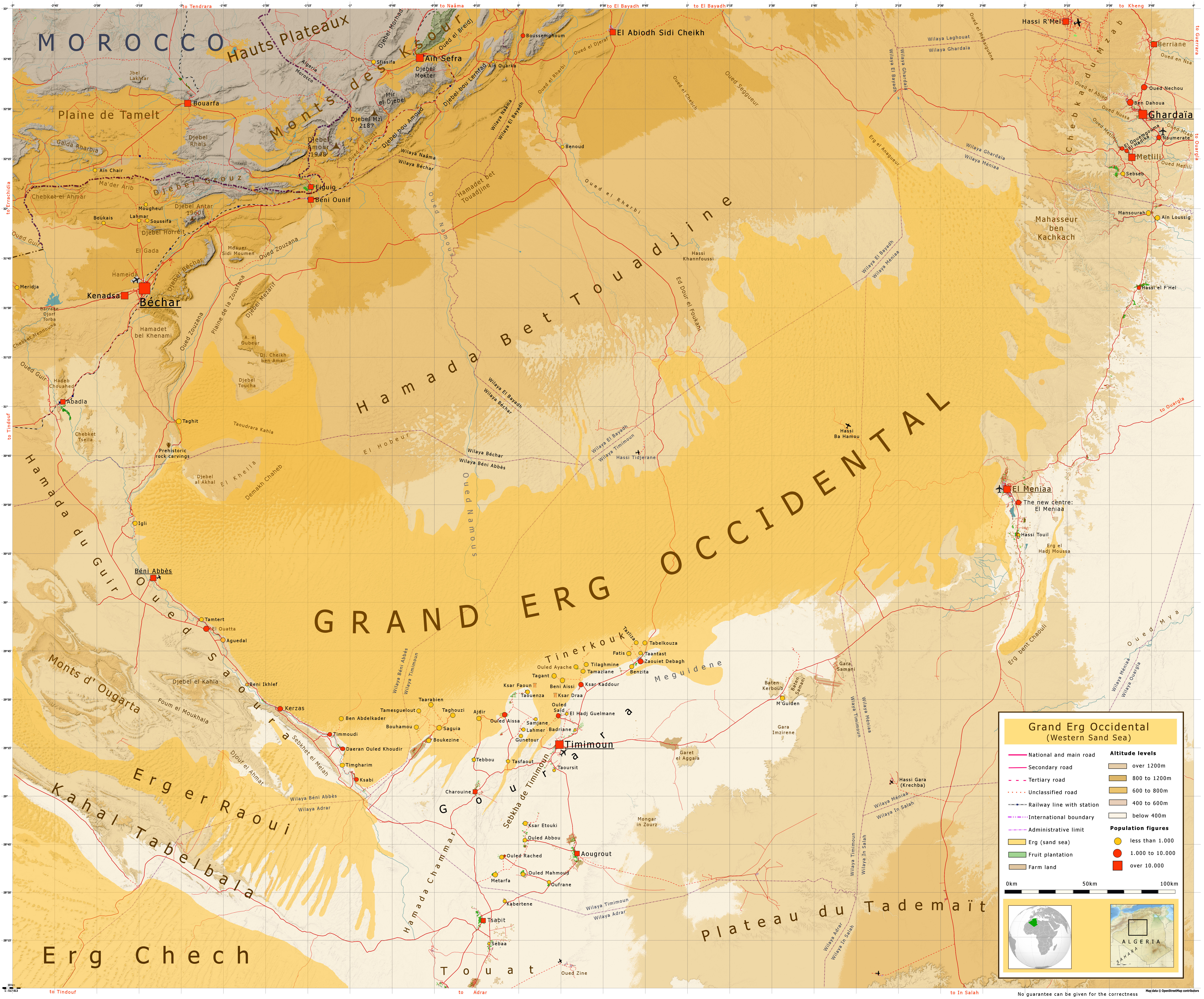
Grand Erg Occidental and its surroundings

== Formation and development ==
During wetter climatic periods starting in the Upper Pliocene, 2.5 million years ago, but especially at the beginning of the Holocene, during the climatic optimum, rivers originating in the Saharan Atlas transported large amounts of rock material into the sedimentary basin where the Grand Erg Occidental later formed. These rock masses, composed mainly of sandstone, were reduced to sand during their transport. During the Pleistocene, during periods of arid climate between approximately 120,000 and 26,000 BP (before present) and between 20,000 and 12,700 BP, the dunes of the erg were formed. This process continued during the Holocene, which also experienced three arid periods. During these dry periods, the sand was not stabilized by vegetation and the dunes were often reshaped by different wind patterns. At certain times, the winds were stronger than today, leading to the formation of high dunes, particularly in the east, southwest of Ghardaïa, and in the west, along the Saoura Valley.

During more recent dry periods, secondary dunes covered most of the higher dunes and formed a network of transverse and barchan dunes that also extended across many corridors between the dunes. These shapes were formed by the interaction of winter cyclonic winds from the northwest and west and southwest winds associated with the summer monsoon.

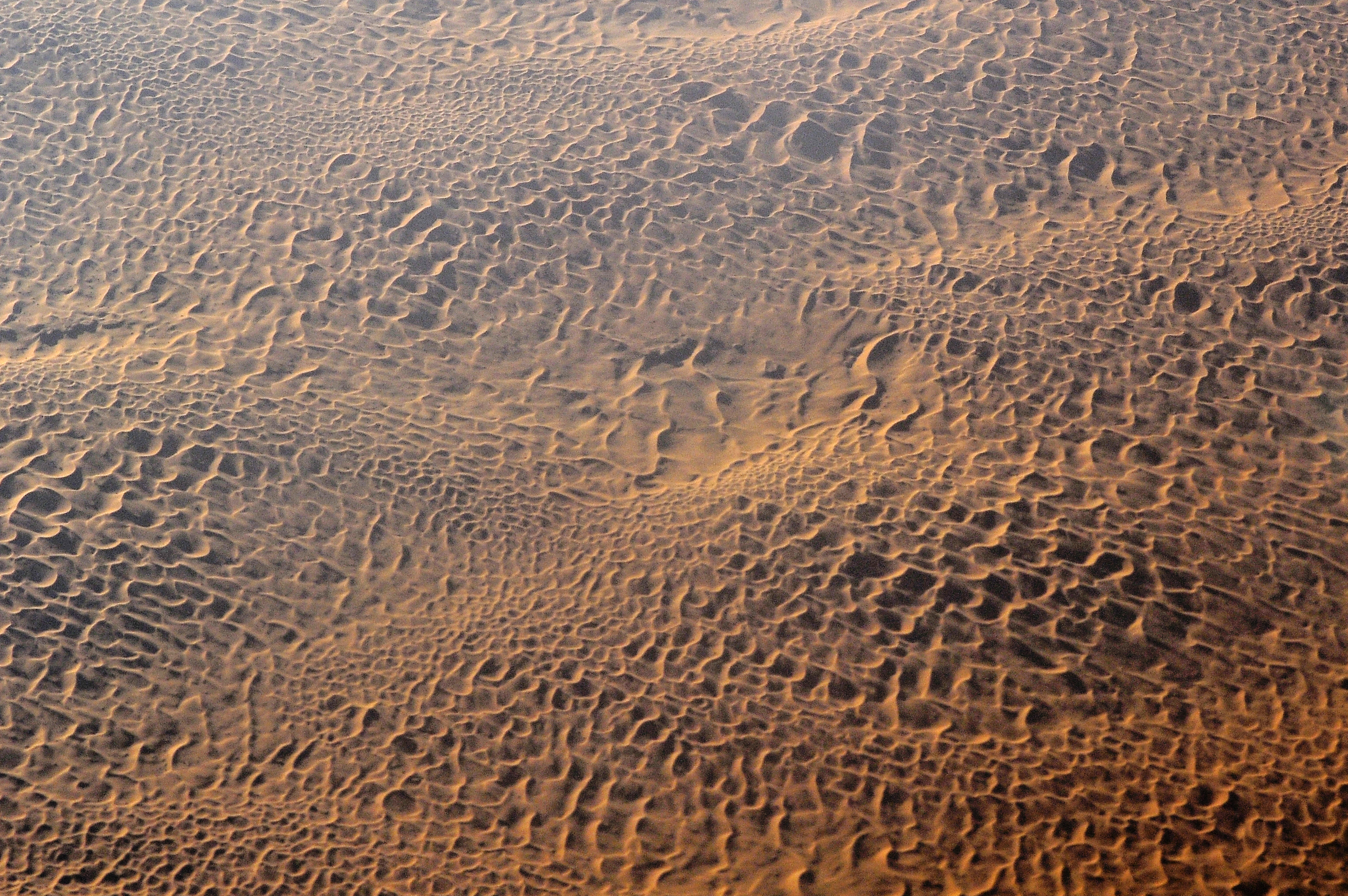
Aerial view of the Erg: a complex network of dunes that has developed over the primary dunes

== Topography ==
The bedrock on which the sand masses of the erg rest slopes from north to south. In the northwest corner, the altitude is 720 m, while it is 350 m at the southwest end. Two small rock formations rise 40 km and 50 km east of Taghit, above the dune zone. Otherwise, the bedrock appears to be flat.

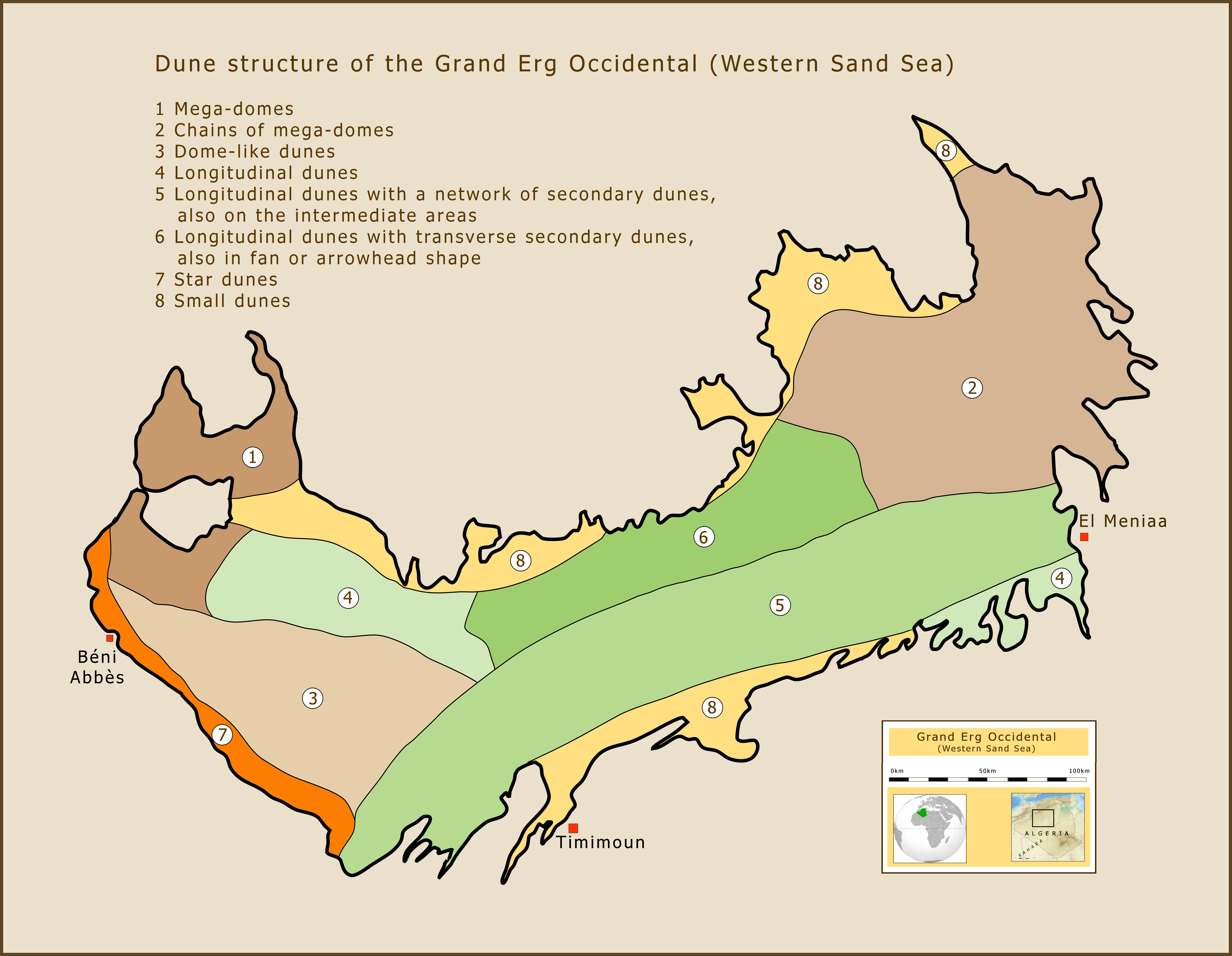
Dune structure of the Grand Erg Occidental

In addition to longitudinal dunes, dome dunes are a common feature in the erg. They often measure 2 km in diameter. They are also arranged in rows that also merge into longitudinal dunes. In the central sector, they have been deformed by strong winds, giving them a fan-shaped or arrowhead shape. Isolated dunes over 100 m high can be found among the dome dunes north of El Menia and those east of Taghit. But the highest dunes rise to the east of the Oued Saoura, with a star dune 3 km northwest of Kerzas, which rises 180 m above the bed of the Oued Saoura.

The sand of the dunes is composed of 95% pure quartz, as well as durable minerals such as zircon, tourmaline, and rutile. This is typical of the Sahara, but not of the sand seas of other regions of the world. The fact that this sand is so highly purified of less stable minerals can be explained by the fact that it must be the result of extensive cycles of weathering and diagenesis. These began after the end of the Proterozoic era 540 million years ago, the last major event of crustal growth in the Sahara region.

The sediment balance is negative in the southern strip between El Menia and the southwestern tip of the erg. Here, the sand is moving southwestward and threatening the settlements in the Gourara and Touat regions. The balance is even in the central strip and positive along the Oued Saoura and in the northern part. Here, there is an enrichment of sand from the Saharan Atlas.

In the eastern part of the erg, there are numerous depressions between the dome dunes. These were formed during dry periods under the effect of strong wind erosion. During the wet periods of the Holocene, they gave rise to prehistoric lakes. Today, these depressions mainly form sebkhas covered with a crust of salt.

Three rivers originating in the Atlas Mountains, the Oued Namous, the Oued er Rharbi, and the Oued Seggeur, flood certain parts of the Hamada Bet Touadjine during high water and also reach the erg. The course of the Oued Namous is clearly visible on satellite images within the erg, although it is partly covered by dunes. It ends in its central part with a sebkha.

== Climate ==
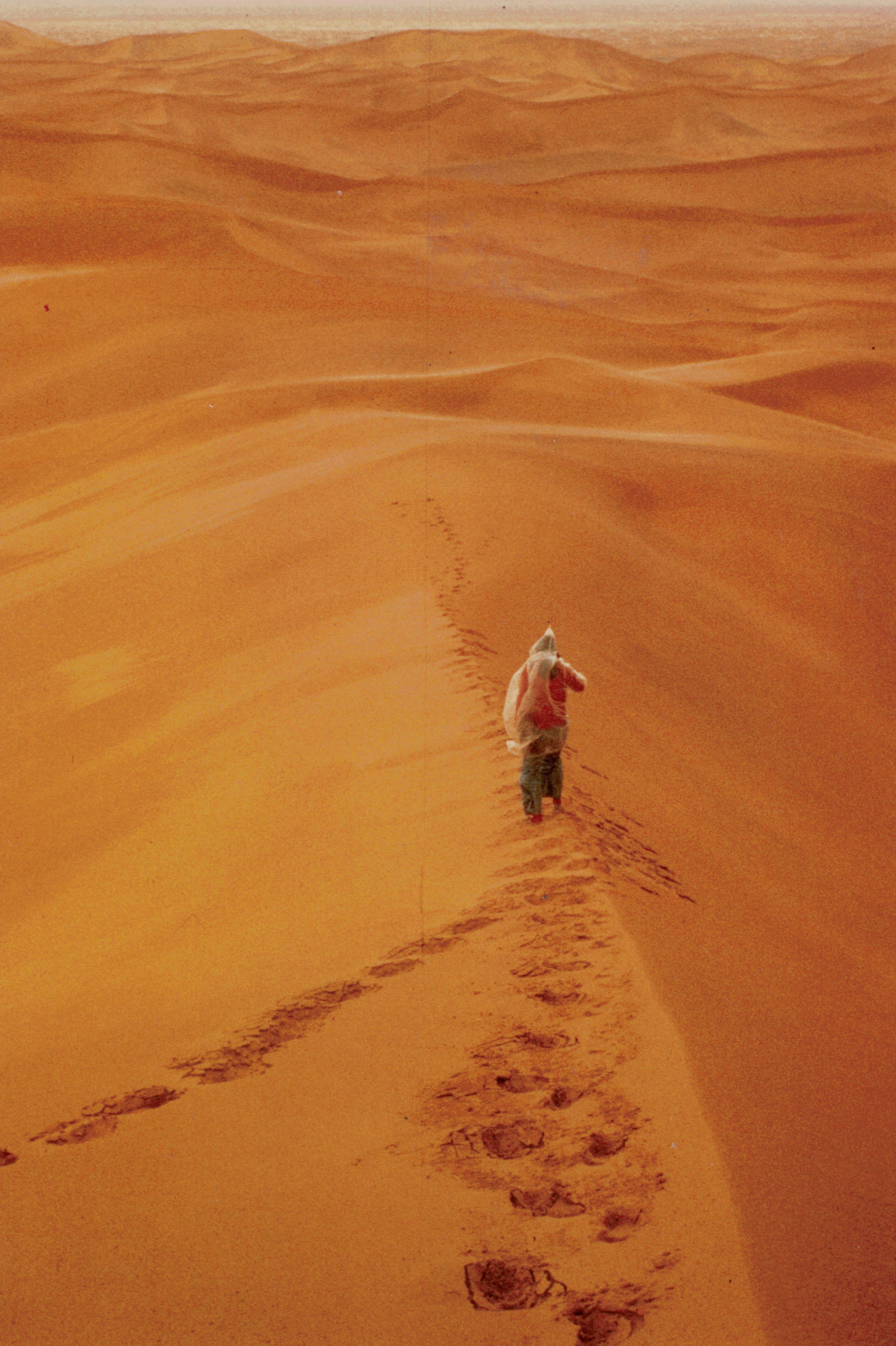
Near Béni Abbès: the erg in rainy weather. The sand is darker.

Average annual rainfall varies between 62 mm in the northwest, 47 mm in the east, 36 mm in the southwest, and 33 mm in the center of the erg. These amounts are relatively high compared to other ergs. For example, in the neighboring Erg Er Raoui, they range from 16 mm to 19 mm, and in the Erg Chech from 8 mm to 10 mm.

Data from Timimoun
The climate is classified as BWh (hot desert climate) according to Köppen-Geiger.	
Monthly average for the hottest month	July, 37 °C
Monthly maximum average	47,8 °C
Lowest monthly average	29 °C
Monthly average for the coldest month	January, 7 °C
Monthly maximum average	19 °C
Lowest monthly average	2,9 °C
Rainiest month	April
Driest month	June

From December to March, the northeast wind is the strongest (northeast trade winds), from June to September, the east wind dominates, and during the other months, it is mainly the east wind. The strongest winds blow in April and May, and the weakest from October to January.

== Hydrology ==
The erg region forms part of the southwestern edge of the Aquifer Continental Intercalaire, one of the largest closed aquifers in the world. This aquifer layer begins at a depth of approximately 300 to 500 m below the surface of the erg. Above it lies the Grand Erg Occidental aquifer, fed by the oueds of the Saharan Atlas, floods at Jebel El Kehla in Morocco, and rainwater infiltration. The water does not flow through the sand of the erg, but below it, in a limestone formation dating from the Miocene and Pliocene epochs. At the southern edge of the erg, the water table is close to the surface, which allows the Gourara region to be irrigated using the foggara system. However, this proven and sustainable method is under threat, as the water table has fallen in recent decades and many foggaras are drying up. This is due to the overexploitation of groundwater reserves as a result of numerous boreholes, combined with inefficient irrigation and a lack of maintenance.

== Flora and fauna ==
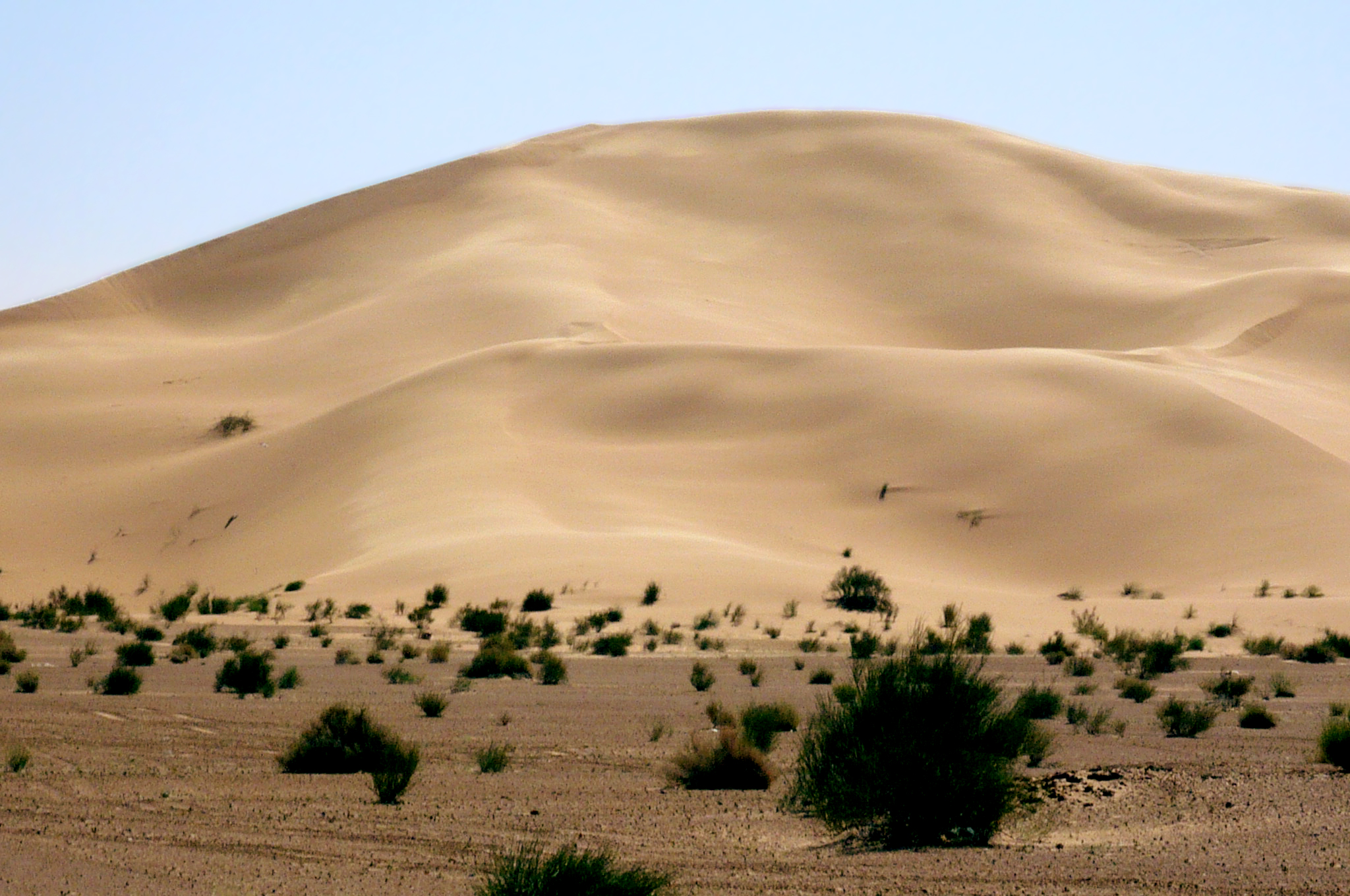
Shrubby landscape in the erg, near Taghit

As the erg receives relatively high rainfall compared to other sandy deserts in the Sahara, its vegetation is more abundant, with shrubs, herbs, and grasses. In the western part of the erg, sandy desert vegetation (Calligono-Aristidetea) has been identified, which takes its name from the genera Calligonum (Polygonaceae family) and Aristida (herbaceous plants of the Poaceae family). These are deep-rooted shrubs and perennial grasses that grow on shifting dunes and sandy expanses. Calligonum azel enables tree-dwelling ants of the genus Crematogaster to live in this dune environment, while Aristida pungens provides most of the food for grain-eating ants of the genera Messor and Monomorium. Drinn grass (Stipagrostis pungens), which is very popular with antelopes, is also widespread. During an inventory carried out in the northwestern and northeastern parts of the erg, the dune areas were dominated by Ephedra alata subsp. alenda and white weeping broom (Retama raetam), as well as Calligonum and mediterranean saltwort (Salsola vermiculata).

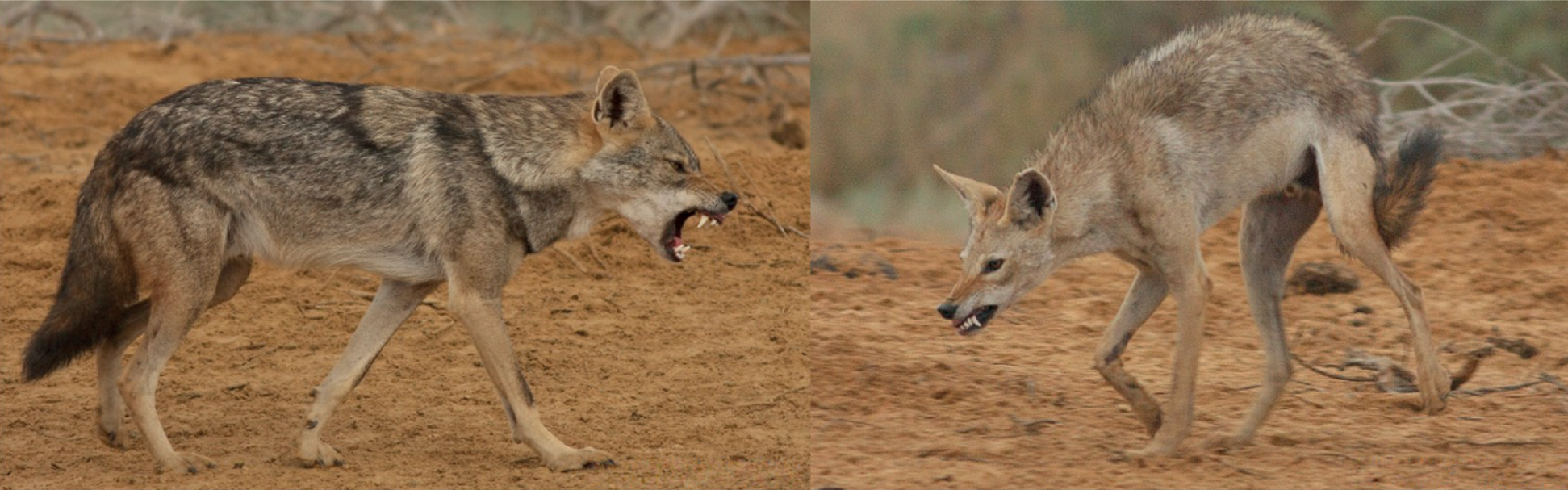
African wolf making threatening gestures

The following (additional) animal species were recorded in the erg:

- African wolf (Canis anthus)
- Fennec fox (Vulpes zerda)
- Saharan striped polecat (Ictonyx libycus)
- Desert hedgehog (Paraechinus aethiopicus)
- Sand cat (Felis margarita)
- North African spiny-tailed lizard (Uromastyx acanthinura)

In 2007, a wildlife inventory was carried out in certain areas of the northern part of the erg and in the Hamada Bet Touadjine. The following animals or traces were observed in the erg region or on its outskirts:

- Rhim gazelle (Gazella leptoceros): The IUCN considers it highly threatened, and estimates its population in the ergs of Algeria and Tunisia at a few hundred adult animals at most. - During the exploration, it was found that Rhim's gazelles prefer flat terrain covered with sand or gravel, surrounded by high dunes. These areas have denser and more varied vegetation than the dunes, offer good visibility, and allow the animals to escape over and above the dunes. In such an environment, they are rarely disturbed, as access via the dunes is difficult for vehicles.

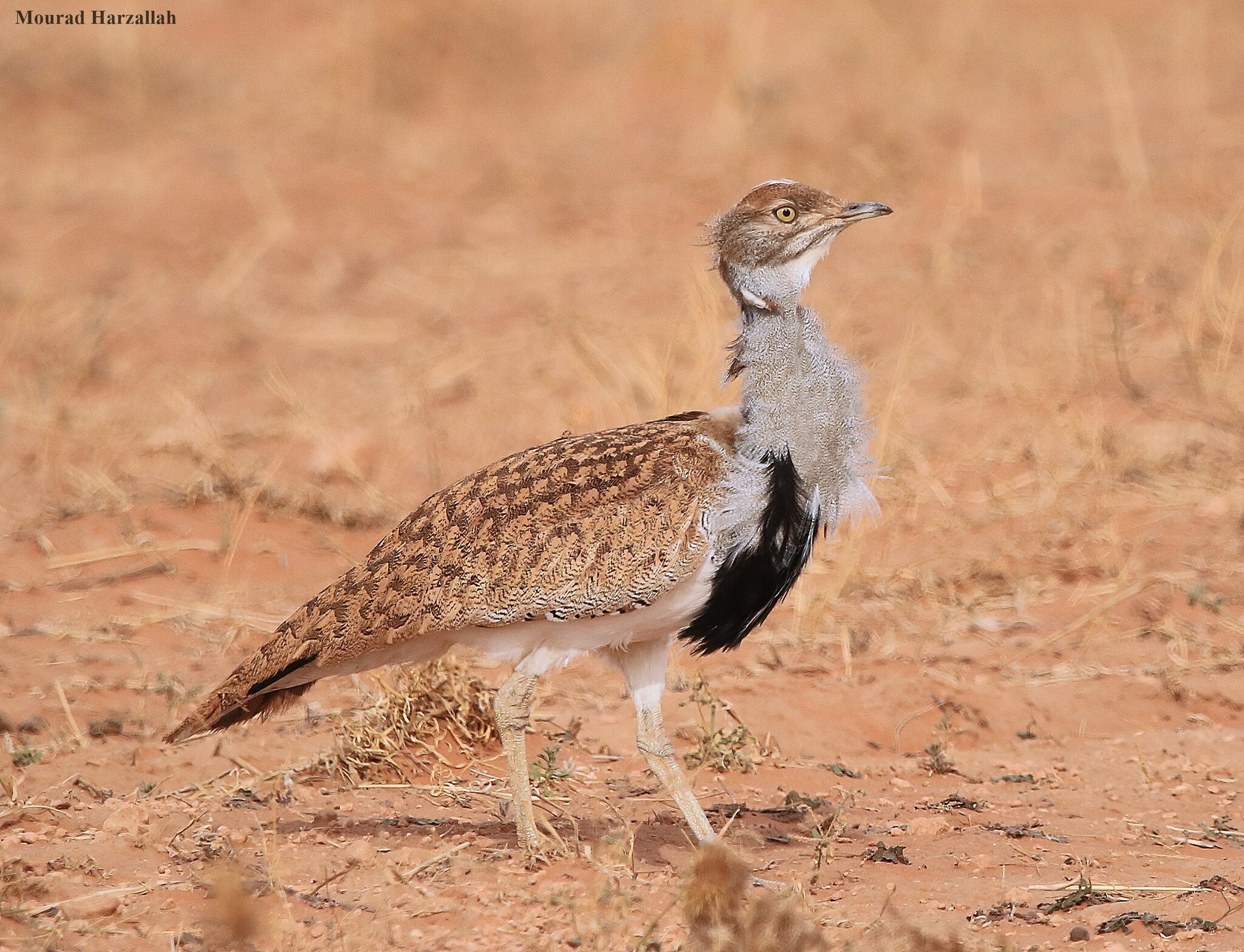
African hubaara

- Dorcas gazelle (Gazella dorcas): has been assessed for The IUCN Red List of Threatened Species.
- Golden jackal (Canis aureus)
- African wildcat (Felis lybica)
- Cape hare (Lepus capensis)
- Porcupine (Lystrix cristata)
- Val's gundi (Ctenodactylus valii)
- Libyan gerbil (Meriones crassus/libycus)
- Three species of the genus Gerbillus (Gerbillus tarabuli, Gerbillus amoenus, Pachyuromys duprasi)
- Short-toed snake eagle (Circaetus gallicus)
- Western marsh harrier (Circus aeruginosus)
- African houbara (Chlamydotis undulata): the IUCN Red List category for Chlamydotis undulata is Vulnerable.
- Long-legged buzzard(Buteo rufinus)
- Cream-coloured courser(Cursorius cursor)

== Mineral resources ==
In the western Algerian Sahara, natural gas is the main resource extracted. Large deposits are found northeast of the erg, near Hassi R'Mel and about 140 km southeast of Timimoun, while another is located near Hassi Tidjerane, slightly north of the erg. Within the erg are exploited: the natural gas deposits at Tinerkouk, 70 km north-northeast of Timimoum, and Hassi Ba Hamou, 100 km west-northwest of El Menia. Both fields are owned by Sonatrach, an Algerian state-owned oil and gas company. From Hassi Tidjerane, via Hassi Ba Hamou, a gas pipeline crosses the erg to join other pipelines leading to Hassi R'Mel.

== Settlement ==
Most of the erg is uninhabited. However, in the southwest, in the Gourara region, there are more than 40 hamlets to medium-sized villages within or on the edge of the erg's dune areas. Their population is around 45,000 (2020). They live mainly from agriculture (date palms, market gardening, irrigated by the traditional foggara system and drilled wells). The largest villages are Ouled Said, Ouled Aissa, Ksar Kaddour, and Zaouiet Debagh.

Further west is the hamlet of Ben Abdelkader, accessible by a paved road from Timmoudi in the Saoura Valley. It has about 160 inhabitants (2020) and has date palms, some of which are protected from the sand dunes by ramparts topped with palm leaves (“ghouds”).

== Traffic routes ==
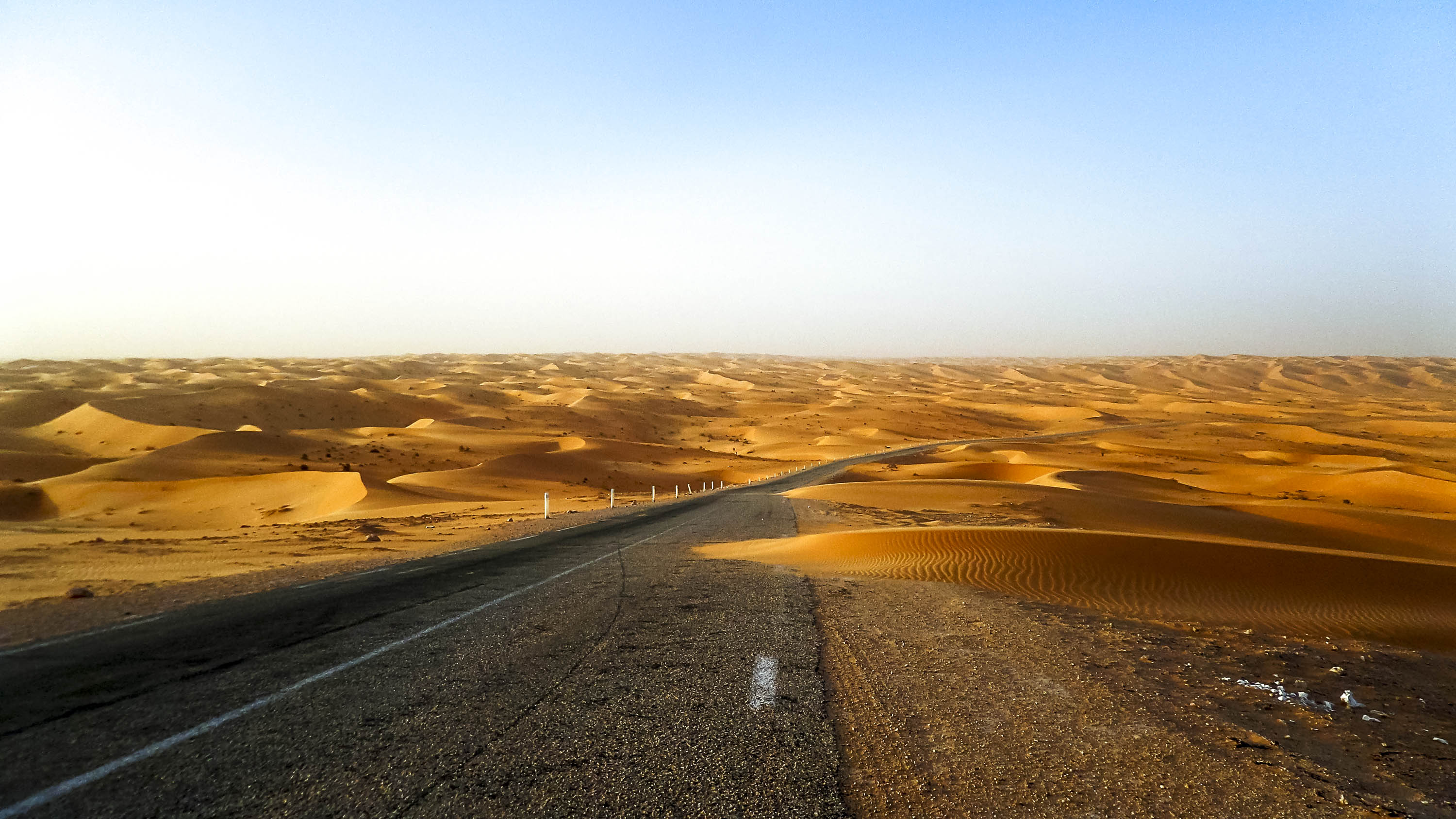
The RN118 in the southern part of the sand sea, with shifting dunes

Much of the erg is covered with interlocking dunes, while in other areas, the spaces between the large dunes are very often covered with a network of small shifting dunes. There are certainly gassi, wind-swept corridors between the longitudinal dunes, with gravelly soil, but these are generally poorly oriented for penetrating the interior or crossing the erg. This is why the Great Western Erg is considered the most inaccessible of the Saharan ergs. Even with current technology, the construction and maintenance of tracks and roads in this environment remain costly. However, in the context of natural gas exploitation in this region, two needs have been reconciled. This led to the construction of the RN118, opened to traffic in 2018, which also connects the natural gas fields of Hassi Tidjerane and Tinerkouk to the national road network. It runs north from Timimoun, crosses the erg, and continues to the fork with the RN68, which reaches the village of El Bnoud (also known as Benoud) after 25 km. Of the 400 km of the RN118, 90 km cross the dune area of the erg.

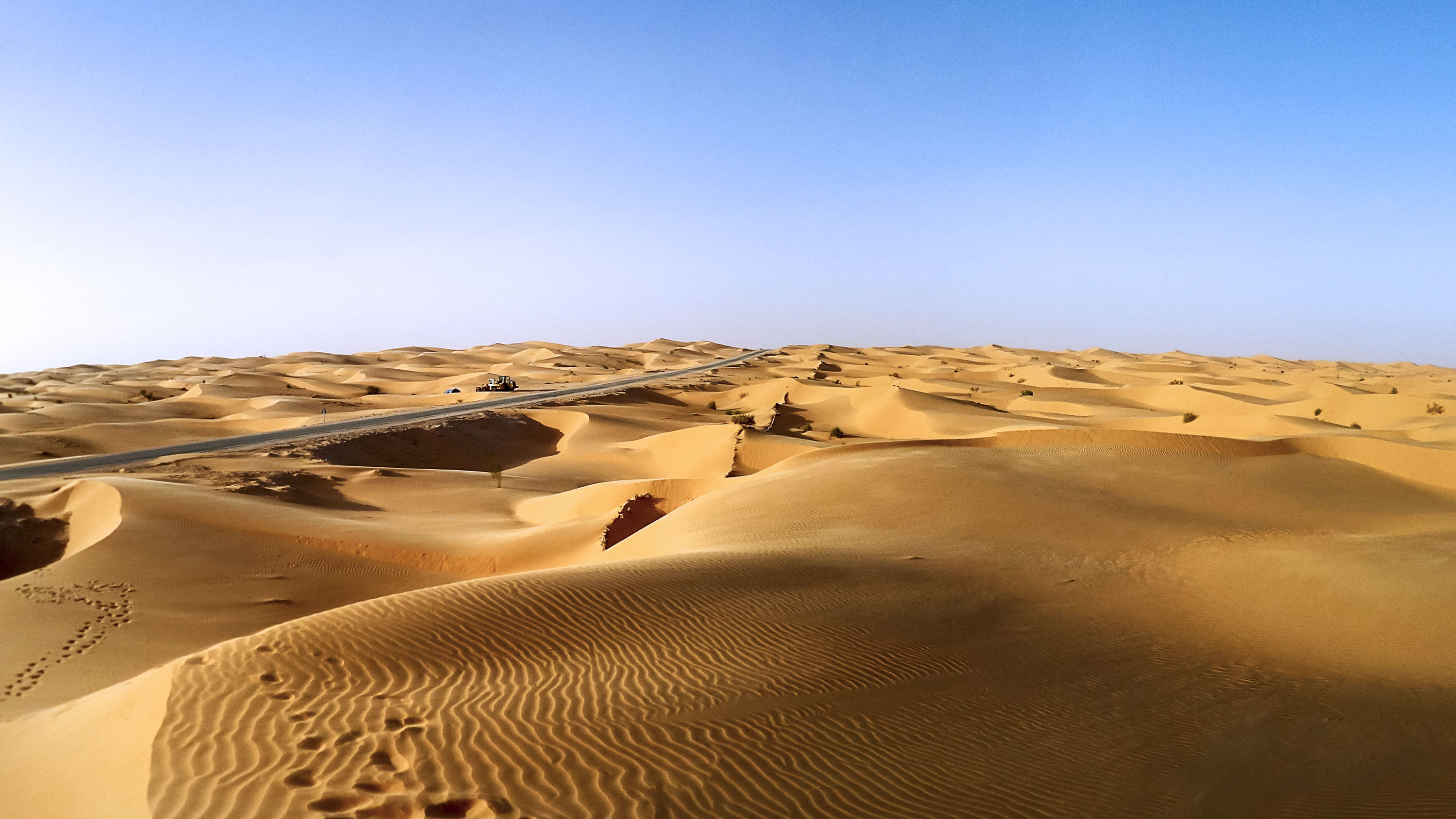
The RN118 northeast of Timimoun, with traces of protection against sand encroachment, parallel to the road.

Satellite images from Google Earth and Bing Maps Areal show that from Zaouiet Debagh, the route first crosses a dense network of shifting dunes. Over a distance of 40 km, dams with dark tops (probably palm fronds or their substitutes) were built at distances of 40 to 80 m east of the road to protect against silting. These have been erected where the flow of sand has a different direction from that of the road. In the northern half of the passage, there are longitudinal dunes extending from north to south, topped by secondary shifting dunes whose crests often extend into the spaces between them. These crests are cut by the road. No protective measures are visible here, as the current sand flow probably extends roughly parallel to the road.

== See also ==
- Erg Chech
- Grand Erg Oriental
- Dune (different types of dunes)
- List of ergs
- Geography of Algeria

== Notes and references ==
Part of this edit is translated from the existing French Wikipedia article at fr:Grand Erg occidental and part is translated from the existing German Wikipedia article at de: Östlicher Großer Erg (geography); see their histories for attribution.
