= Metarfa =

Metarfa المطارفة
- Town and commune
- Location of Metarfa commune within the former Adrar Province

- Location of Metarfa in Algeria
- Coordinates: 28°35′21″N 0°8′59″W
- Country: Algeria
- Province: Timimoun
- District: Aougrout
- Elevation: 258 m (846 ft)

Population (2008)
  - Total: 8,438
- Time zone: UTC+1 (CET)

Metarfa (Arabic: المطارفة) is a town and commune in Aougrout District, Timimoun Province, in south-central Algeria. Before the 2019 redistribution the larger Aougrout District was located in the Adrar Province. According to the 2008 census it has a population of 8,438, up from 7,061 in 1998, with an annual growth rate of 1.8%.

== Geography ==
The villages in Metarfa commune are built near various scattered oases in the southern part of the Gourara region of the Timimoun Province, about halfway between Timimoun and Adrar. The surrounding areas generally consist of rocky plains interspersed with low sand dunes.

== Climate ==
Metarfa has a hot desert climate (Köppen climate classification BWh), with extremely hot summers and mild winters, and very little precipitation throughout the year.

Climate data for Metarfa
Month	Jan	Feb	Mar	Apr	May	Jun	Jul	Aug	Sep	Oct	Nov	Dec	Year
Mean daily maximum °C (°F)	20.0 (68.0)	22.7 (72.9)	27.4 (81.3)	32.6 (90.7)	36.5 (97.7)	42.8 (109.0)	45.8 (114.4)	44.3 (111.7)	40.2 (104.4)	33.0 (91.4)	25.2 (77.4)	18.1 (64.6)	32.4 (90.3)
Daily mean °C (°F)	12.2 (54.0)	14.8 (58.6)	19.1 (66.4)	24.2 (75.6)	28.1 (82.6)	34.1 (93.4)	37.0 (98.6)	35.8 (96.4)	32.2 (90.0)	25.4 (77.7)	18.1 (64.6)	12.0 (53.6)	24.4 (76.0)
Mean daily minimum °C (°F)	4.4 (39.9)	7.0 (44.6)	10.9 (51.6)	15.9 (60.6)	19.8 (67.6)	25.4 (77.7)	28.2 (82.8)	27.3 (81.1)	24.2 (75.6)	17.8 (64.0)	11.1 (52.0)	6.0 (42.8)	16.5 (61.7)
Average precipitation mm (inches)	1 (0.0)	2 (0.1)	3 (0.1)	1 (0.0)	1 (0.0)	0 (0)	0 (0)	1 (0.0)	1 (0.0)	2 (0.1)	2 (0.1)	2 (0.1)	16 (0.5)
Source: climate-data.org

== Transportation ==
Roads lead out of Metarfa town to the southwest and northeast. The road to the southeast connects to the N6 highway, while the road to the northeast branches; the branch to the northwest leads to the villages of Ouled Rached and Ouled Ali while the branch to the southeast leads to Ouled Mahmoud and Oufrane, and eventually to Aougrout.

== Education ==
2.8% of the population has a tertiary education, and another 10.5% has completed secondary education. The overall literacy rate is 73.8%, and is 85.8% among males and 61.2% among females.

== Localities ==
As of 1984, the commune was composed of 11 localities:

- Ouled Mahmoud
- Saala
- Metarfa
- Ouled Rached
- Ouled Ali
- Oufrane
