= Tinerkouk District =

Coordinates: 29°45′N 0°30′E

Tinerkouk District دائرة تينركوك
- District
- Location in the former Adrar Province
- Country: Algeria
- Province: Timimoun Province
- Time zone: UTC+1 (CET)

Tinerkouk District is a district of Timimoun Province, Algeria.

== Communes ==
The district is further divided into 2 communes:

- Tinerkouk
- Ksar Kaddour
