= Timimoun District =

Timimoun District دائرة تيميمون
- District
- Location in the former Adrar Province
- Coordinates: 29°16′N 0°14′E
- Country: Algeria
- Province: Timimoun Province
- Capital: Timimoun

Population (2008)
  - Total: 41,279
- Time zone: UTC+1 (CET)

Timimoun District is a district of Timimoun Province, Algeria. According to the 2008 census, it has a population of 41,279.

== Communes ==
The district is further divided into 2 communes:

- Timimoun
- Ouled Said
