= Aougrout =

Aougrout أوﻗﺮت
- Commune
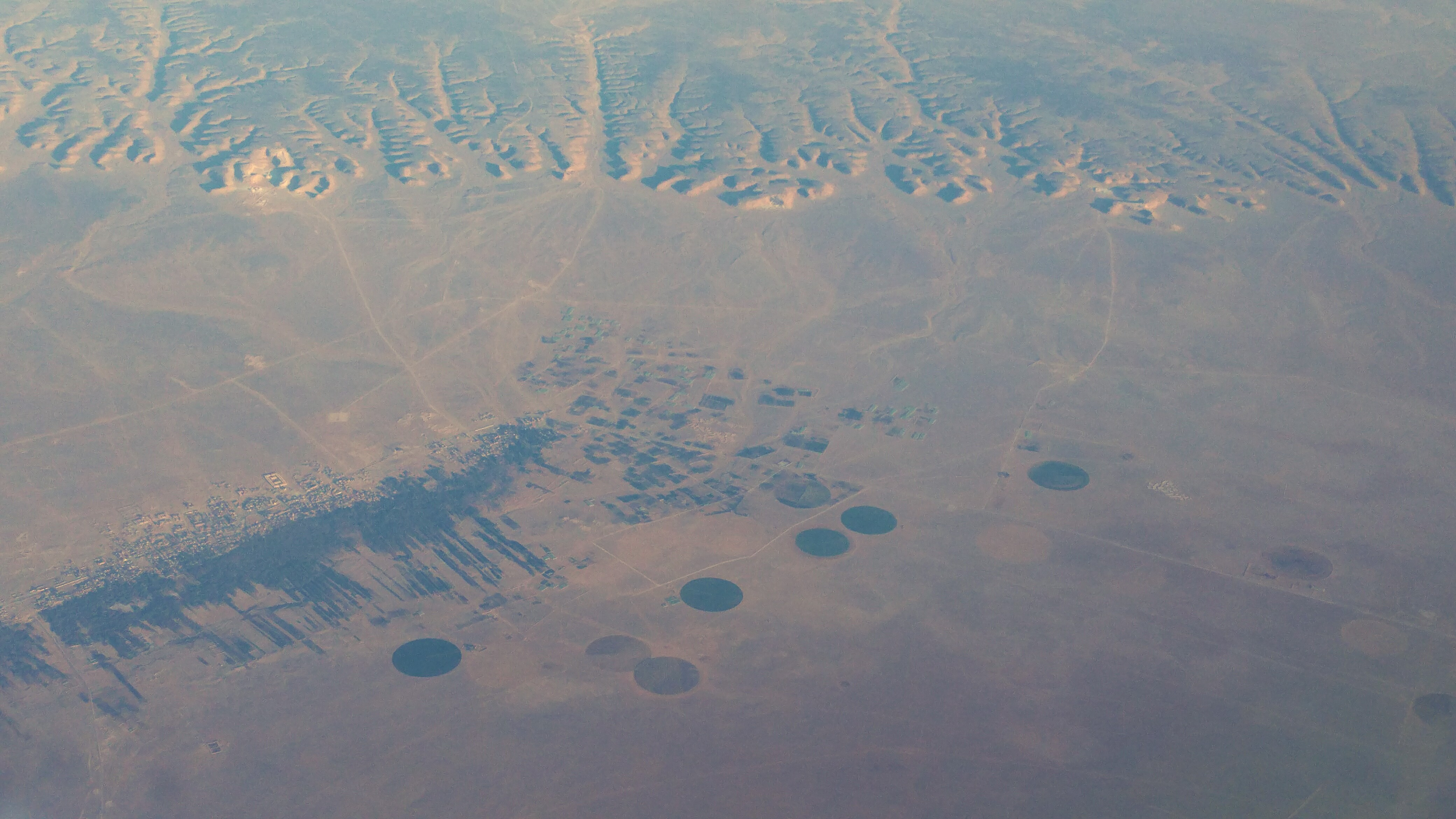

- Location within Algeria
- Coordinates: 28°42′N 0°19′E
- Country: Algeria
- Province: Timimoun
- District: Aougrout
- Elevation: 282 m (925 ft)

Population (2008)
  - Total: 11,784
- Time zone: UTC+1 (CET)

Aougrout (Arabic: أوﻗﺮت) is a commune in Aougrout District, Timimoun Province, in south-central Algeria. According to the 2008 census it has a population of 11,784, up from 9,878 in 1998, with an annual growth rate of 1.8%.

== Geography ==
The population center of Aougrout commune is centered on an oasis located in the southern part of the Gourara region, 69 kilometres (43 mi) northeast of the provincial capital Timimoun. Most of the villages of the commune are located on the eastern side of the oasis. Most of the region surrounding the oasis is a flat rocky plain (a reg), but some low hills rise to the east and south-east.

== Climate ==
Aougrout has a hot desert climate (Köppen climate classification BWh), with extremely hot summers and mild winters, and very little precipitation throughout the year.

== Transportation ==
Aougrout is connected by a road leading north to Timimoun, a road leading west to the Deldoul oasis, and a road leading southwest to Tsabit (and from there to Adrar via the N6 national highway).

== Education ==
6.4% of the population has a tertiary education, and another 15.3% has completed secondary education. The overall literacy rate is 75.8%, and is 88.0% among males and 63.5% among females.

== Localities ==
As of 1984, the commune was composed of 11 localities:

- Tiberrhamine
- Ksar El Hadj
- Tinekline
- Tala
- Zaouiet Sidi Abdellah
- Aboud Ben Ayed
- Akbour
- Zaouiet Sidi Omeur Charef
- Bou Guema
