= Sbaa =

Sbaa اﻟﺴﺒﻊ
- Town and commune
- Location of Sbaa commune within Adrar Province

- Location of Sbaa within Algeria
- Coordinates: 28°13′0″N 0°10′19″W
- Country: Algeria
- Province: Adrar
- District: Tsabit
- Elevation: 264 m (866 ft)

Population (2008)
  - Total: 2,312
- Time zone: UTC+1 (CET)

Sbaa (Arabic: اﻟﺴﺒﻊ) is a town and commune in Tsabit District, Adrar Province, south-central Algeria. According to the 2008 census it has a population of 2,312, up from 1,989 in 1998, with an annual growth rate of 1.5%, making it the least populated commune in the province.

== Geography ==
The town of Sbaa and the nearby village of El Guerara lie at the very southern end of the Gourara region, an area in northern Adrar Province with many scattered oases. The town itself lies on the eastern and north-eastern sides of a small oasis.

An oil refinery lies about 2 kilometres (1.2 mi) to the east of Sbaa.

== Climate ==
Sbaa has a hot desert climate (Köppen climate classification BWh), with extremely hot summers and mild winters, and very little precipitation throughout the year.

Climate data for Sbaa
Month	Jan	Feb	Mar	Apr	May	Jun	Jul	Aug	Sep	Oct	Nov	Dec	Year
Mean daily maximum °C (°F)	20.1 (68.2)	22.9 (73.2)	27.5 (81.5)	32.7 (90.9)	36.7 (98.1)	42.9 (109.2)	45.8 (114.4)	44.2 (111.6)	40.2 (104.4)	33.0 (91.4)	25.3 (77.5)	17.0 (62.6)	32.4 (90.3)
Daily mean °C (°F)	12.1 (53.8)	14.9 (58.8)	19.1 (66.4)	24.2 (75.6)	28.2 (82.8)	34.2 (93.6)	36.9 (98.4)	35.6 (96.1)	32.1 (89.8)	25.3 (77.5)	18.0 (64.4)	11.4 (52.5)	24.3 (75.8)
Mean daily minimum °C (°F)	4.2 (39.6)	6.9 (44.4)	10.8 (51.4)	15.8 (60.4)	19.7 (67.5)	25.5 (77.9)	28.0 (82.4)	27.1 (80.8)	24.1 (75.4)	17.6 (63.7)	10.8 (51.4)	5.8 (42.4)	16.4 (61.4)
Average precipitation mm (inches)	1 (0.0)	1 (0.0)	3 (0.1)	1 (0.0)	1 (0.0)	0 (0)	0 (0)	1 (0.0)	1 (0.0)	3 (0.1)	2 (0.1)	2 (0.1)	16 (0.4)
Source: climate-data.org

== Transportation ==
Sbaa lies on the N6 national highway along with the village of El Guerara 4 kilometres (2.5 mi) to the south. The N6 highway leads north to Béchar and south to Adrar.

== Education ==
2.4% of the population has a tertiary education, and another 15.8% has completed secondary education. The overall literacy rate is 78.8%, and is 85.5% among males and 71.4% among females.

== Localities ==
As of 1984, the commune was composed of three localities:

- Sbaa
- Village socialiste
- El Guerara
