= Talmine =

Talmine ﻃﺎﻟﻤﻴﻦ
- Town and commune
- Location of Talmine commune within the former Adrar Province

- Location of Talmine within Algeria
- Coordinates: 29°19′53″N 0°29′51″W
- Country: Algeria
- Province: Timimoun
- District: Charouine
- Elevation: 364 m (1,194 ft)

Population (2008)
  - Total: 12,768
- Time zone: UTC+1 (CET)

Talmine (Arabic: ﻃﺎﻟﻤﻴﻦ) was a town and commune in Charouine District, Adrar Province, in south-central Algeria. In 2019, the redistribution moved the larger Charouine District into the newly-created Timimoun Province. According to the 2008 census it has a population of 12,768, up from 9,469 in 1998, with an annual growth rate of 3.1%.

== Geography ==
Talmine commune lies at an elevation of about 364 metres (1,194 ft). It covers the westernmost oases in the Gourara region of the Timimoun Province (excepting the villages of Meslila and Bent Cherk that lies in Béchar Province. The oases mainly lie in the southernmost part of the Grand Erg Occidental, a large area of sand dunes stretching well into Béchar and El Bayadh provinces.

== Climate ==
Talmine has a hot desert climate (Köppen climate classification BWh), with extremely hot summers and mild winters, and very little precipitation throughout the year.

Climate data for Talmine (Boukezzine)
Month	Jan	Feb	Mar	Apr	May	Jun	Jul	Aug	Sep	Oct	Nov	Dec	Year
Mean daily maximum °C (°F)	19.1 (66.4)	22.0 (71.6)	26.6 (79.9)	31.6 (88.9)	35.7 (96.3)	41.7 (107.1)	45.1 (113.2)	43.6 (110.5)	39.1 (102.4)	31.7 (89.1)	24.4 (75.9)	18.7 (65.7)	31.6 (88.9)
Daily mean °C (°F)	11.6 (52.9)	14.3 (57.7)	18.6 (65.5)	23.4 (74.1)	27.5 (81.5)	33.1 (91.6)	36.4 (97.5)	35.2 (95.4)	31.3 (88.3)	24.4 (75.9)	17.5 (63.5)	12.2 (54.0)	23.8 (74.8)
Mean daily minimum °C (°F)	4.1 (39.4)	6.6 (43.9)	10.6 (51.1)	15.3 (59.5)	19.3 (66.7)	24.6 (76.3)	27.8 (82.0)	26.9 (80.4)	23.6 (74.5)	17.2 (63.0)	10.7 (51.3)	5.7 (42.3)	16.0 (60.9)
Average precipitation mm (inches)	2 (0.1)	3 (0.1)	5 (0.2)	2 (0.1)	1 (0.0)	0 (0)	0 (0)	1 (0.0)	1 (0.0)	4 (0.2)	4 (0.2)	3 (0.1)	26 (1)
Source: climate-data.org

== Transportation ==
The main road through the commune is a provincial road that starts at the village of Taghouzi, passes through Taguenout, Saguia and Boukezzine before connecting to the N6 national highway southeast of Ksabi. A number of local roads connect this main road to the villages of the commune.

== Education ==
1.0% of the population has a tertiary education (the second lowest in the commune), and another 3.2% has completed secondary education. The overall literacy rate is 36.4% (the second lowest in Adrar Province), and is 56.2% among males (second lowest in the province) and 15.0% among females (lowest in the province).

== Localities ==
As of 1984, the commune was composed of 11 localities:

- Boukezine
- Talmine
- Saguia
- Guettouf
- Takialt
- Taghouzi
- Naama
- Taarabien
- Tamesguelout
- Timarine
- Yahia Oudriss
- Bahammou
- Zaïtar
- Rached
- Taguenout
- Guellou
