= Timimoun Airport =

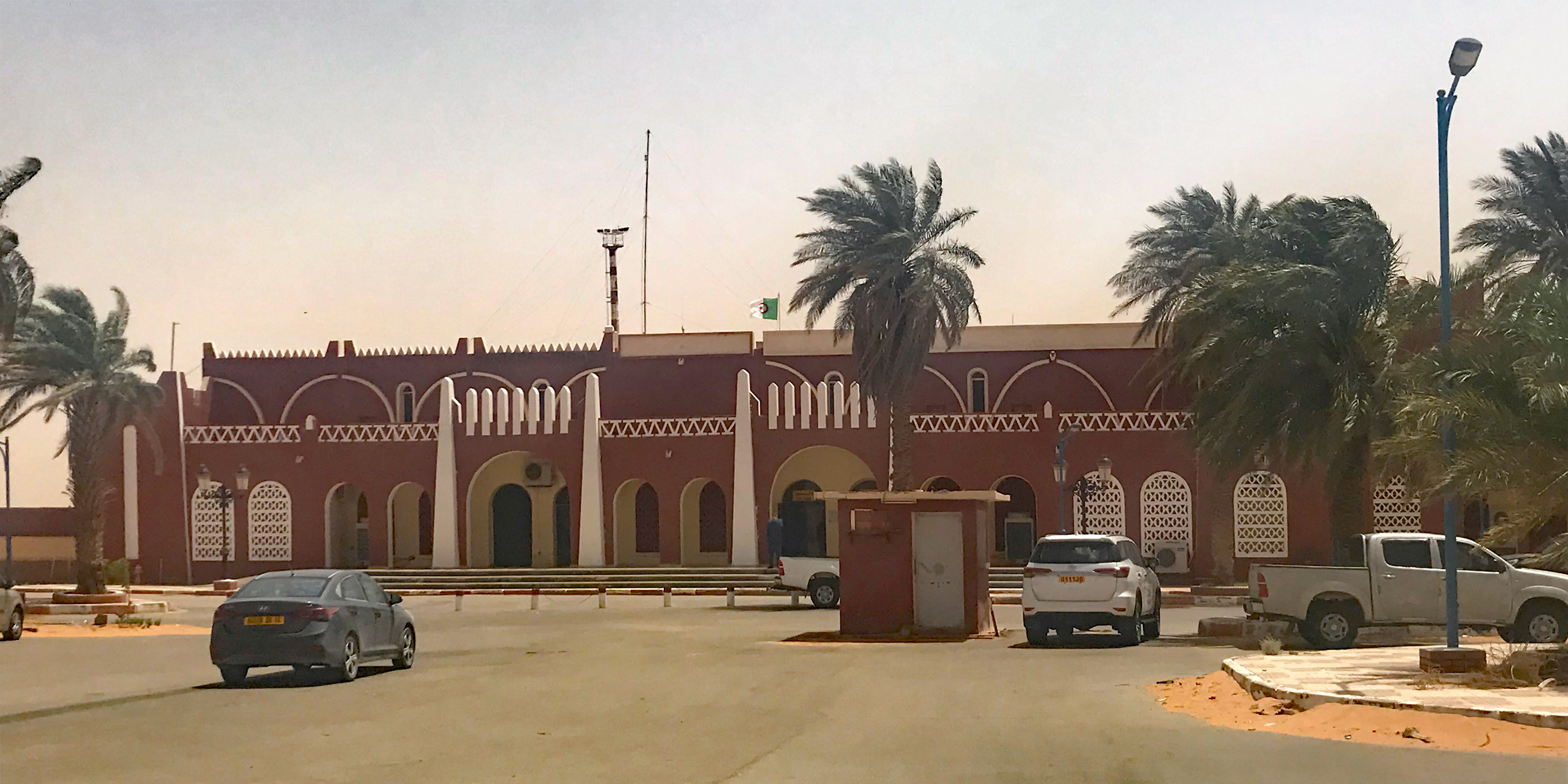
- IATA: TMX; ICAO: DAUT

Summary
- Airport type: Public
- Serves: Timimoun, Algeria
- Elevation AMSL: 1,027 ft (313 m)
- Coordinates: 29°14′12″N 0°16′35″E

Map
- Location of airport in Algeria

Runways
Direction	Length		Surface
Direction	m	ft	Surface
06/24	3,000	9,843	Asphalt

Statistics (2010)
- Passengers: 27,961
- Passenger change 09–10: ▼43.1%
- Aircraft movements: 973
- Movements change 09–10: ▼58.6%
- Source: Algerian AIP Landings.com

Timimoun Airport is an airport serving Timimoun, a town in the Timimoun Province of Algeria (IATA: TMX, ICAO: DAUT). The airport is in the desert 4 kilometres (2 mi) southeast of the town.

== Statistics ==
Traffic by calendar year. Official ACI Statistics
	Pass- engers	Change from previous year	Aircraft opera- tions	Change from previous year	Cargo (metric tons)	Change from previous year
2005	5,538	▼29.30%	335	▲1.21%	N.A.	N.A.
2006	4,524	▼18.31%	456	▲36.12%	N.A.	N.A.
2007	2,859	▼36.80%	733	▲60.75%	N.A.	N.A.
2008	32,620	▲1041.0%	2,478	▲238.06%	29	N.A.
2009	49,179	▲50.76%	2,349	▼5.21%	66	▲127.59%
2010	27,961	▼43.14%	973	▼58.58%	48	▼27.27%
Source: Airports Council International. World Airport Traffic Reports (Years 2005, 2006, 2007, 2009 and 2010)

== See also ==
- Transport in Algeria
- List of airports in Algeria
