= Tsabit District =

Tsabit District دائرة تسابيت
- District
- Coordinates: 28°21′N 0°13′W
- Country: Algeria
- Province: Adrar Province
- Capital: Tsabit

Population (2008)
  - Total: 17,207
- Time zone: UTC+1 (CET)

Tsabit District is a district of Adrar Province, Algeria. According to the 2008 census, it has a population of 17,207.

== Communes ==
The district is further divided into 2 communes:

- Tsabit
- Sbaa
