= Tinerkouk =

Coordinates: 29°45′N 0°30′E

Tinerkouk: تينركوك (Arabic); ⵜⵉⵏⴻⵔⴽⵓⴽ (Berber languages)
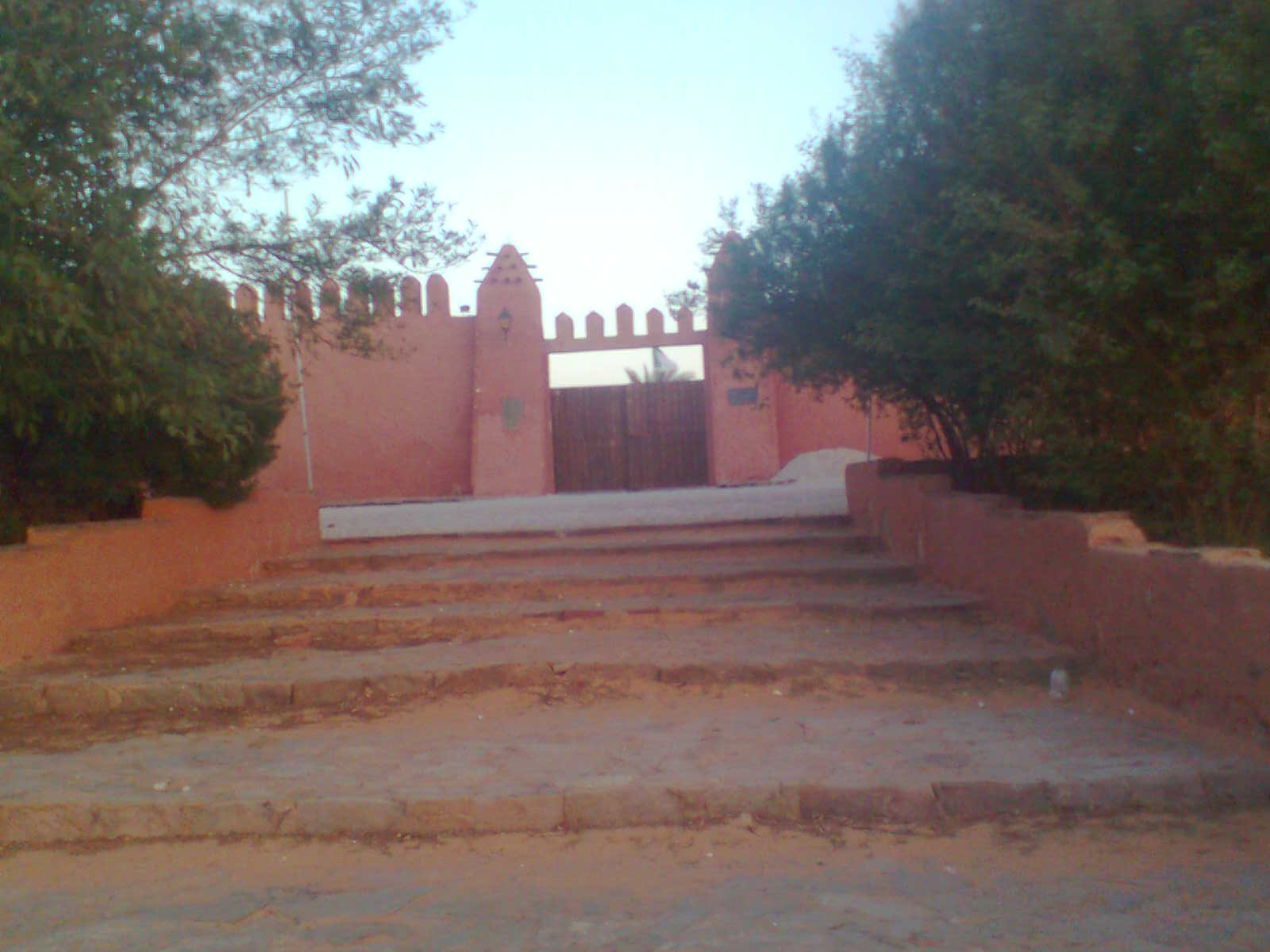

- Country: Algeria
- Province: Timimoun

Population (2008)
  - Total: 15,980
- Time zone: UTC+1 (West Africa Time)

Tinerkouk is a town and commune in Timimoun Province, central Algeria.

== Geography ==
Tinerkouk is located on the southern end of the Grand Erg Occidental. It is served by national road RN118. The nearest civil airport is Timimoun Airport in Timimoun, located about 75km (46mi) away.

=== Localities of the commune ===
The commune is composed of 7 localities:

- Zaouiet Debbagh
- Taantast
- Tabelkouza
- Tazliza
- Aïn Hamou
- Fatis
- Oudghagh
- Benzita

== Demographics ==
As of the 2008 Algerian census, Tinerkouk had 8,185 males and 7,795 females.

== Economy ==
The Tinerkouk region is known for its production of dates and the development of market gardening.

The government of Algeria intends to build a film production city in Tinerkouk, the first in southern Algeria, due to its abundant natural and cultural assets.
