= Charouine =

Charouine ﺷﺮوﻳﻦ
- Town and commune
- Location of Charouine commune within the former Adrar Province

- Location of Charouine within Algeria
- Coordinates: 29°1′7″N 0°15′28″W
- Country: Algeria
- Province: Timimoun
- District: Charouine
- Elevation: 285 m (935 ft)

Population (2008)
  - Total: 11,347
- Time zone: UTC+1 (CET)

Charouine (Arabic: ﺷﺮوﻳﻦ) is a town and commune, and capital of Charouine District, in Timimoun Province, south-central Algeria. According to the 2008 census it has a population of 11,347, up from 8,678 in 1998, with an annual growth rate of 1.8%.

== Geography ==
Charouine lies at an elevation of 285 metres (935 ft) near an oasis, part of the Gourara region of the Timimoun Province. Groves of trees are found around the main town; to the north-west the terrain is dominated by rocky areas and sand dunes, while to the south-east near the village of Taguelzi the terrain falls away dramatically, featuring cliffs up to 50 metres (160 ft) high.

== Climate ==
Charouine has a hot desert climate (Köppen climate classification BWh), with extremely hot summers and mild winters, and very little precipitation throughout the year.

Climate data for Charouine
| Month | Jan | Feb | Mar | Apr | May | Jun | Jul | Aug | Sep | Oct | Nov | Dec | Year |
|---|---|---|---|---|---|---|---|---|---|---|---|---|---|
| Mean daily maximum °C (°F) | 19.5 (67.1) | 22.3 (72.1) | 27.1 (80.8) | 32.2 (90.0) | 36.1 (97.0) | 42.2 (108.0) | 45.5 (113.9) | 44.1 (111.4) | 39.7 (103.5) | 32.4 (90.3) | 24.9 (76.8) | 18.9 (66.0) | 32.1 (89.7) |
| Daily mean °C (°F) | 11.9 (53.4) | 14.6 (58.3) | 19.0 (66.2) | 23.9 (75.0) | 27.8 (82.0) | 33.5 (92.3) | 36.8 (98.2) | 35.7 (96.3) | 31.8 (89.2) | 25.0 (77.0) | 18.0 (64.4) | 12.4 (54.3) | 24.2 (75.6) |
| Mean daily minimum °C (°F) | 4.4 (39.9) | 6.9 (44.4) | 10.9 (51.6) | 15.7 (60.3) | 19.6 (67.3) | 24.9 (76.8) | 28.1 (82.6) | 27.3 (81.1) | 24.0 (75.2) | 17.7 (63.9) | 11.1 (52.0) | 6.0 (42.8) | 16.4 (61.5) |
| Average precipitation mm (inches) | 1 (0.0) | 2 (0.1) | 4 (0.2) | 1 (0.0) | 1 (0.0) | 0 (0) | 0 (0) | 1 (0.0) | 1 (0.0) | 3 (0.1) | 3 (0.1) | 2 (0.1) | 19 (0.6) |
Source: climate-data.org

== Transportation ==
Charouine lies on the N51 national highway that connects the N6 national highway in the southwest to the N1 national highway further east (in southern Ghardaïa Province). The N6 national highway then leads north to Béchar and south to Adrar, while the N1 leads north to Ghardaïa and south to Tamanrasset. The town of Timimoun is located about 60 kilometres (37 mi) to the east, also on the N51, while the provincial capital Adrar is about 150 kilometres (93 mi) to the south by road.

== Education ==
2.8% of the population has a tertiary education, and another 8.4% has completed secondary education. The overall literacy rate is 54.2%, and is 71.8% among males and 35.0% among females.

== Localities ==
As of 1984, the commune was composed of ten localities:

- Charouine
- Taourirt
- Adjir Rharbi
- Adjir Chergui
- Taguelzi
- Tinekham
- Bakou
- Beni Islem
- Asfaou
- Tabou
