= Tsabit =

Tsabit ﺗﺴﺎﺑﻴﺖ
- Town and commune
- Location of Tsabit commune within Adrar Province

- Location of Tsabit within Algeria
- Coordinates: 28°21′1″N 0°13′15″W
- Country: Algeria
- Province: Adrar
- District: Tsabit
- Elevation: 257 m (843 ft)

Population (2008)
  - Total: 14,895
- Time zone: UTC+1 (CET)

Tsabit (Arabic: ﺗﺴﺎﺑﻴﺖ) is a town and commune, and capital of Tsabit District, in Adrar Province, south-central Algeria. According to the 2008 census it has a population of 14,895, up from 11,832 in 1998, with an annual growth rate of 2.4%.

== Geography ==
The commune of Tsabit lies at an elevation of around 257 metres (843 ft) near a string of oases, at the southern end of the Gourara region of northern Adrar Province. The oases form a crescent shape; most of the villages are found on the eastern edge, while there are scattered palm trees to the west of the oasis. The area is surrounded by a mixture of rocky and sandy desert. The town of Kabertene lies across the N6 to the northeast of the main oases.

== Climate ==
Tsabit has a hot desert climate (Köppen climate classification BWh), with summers among the warmest in the world, and only 17 mm (0.67 in) of precipitation in the average year.

Climate data for Brinkane, Tsabit Commune
Month	Jan	Feb	Mar	Apr	May	Jun	Jul	Aug	Sep	Oct	Nov	Dec	Year
Mean daily maximum °C (°F)	20.1 (68.2)	22.8 (73.0)	27.5 (81.5)	32.7 (90.9)	36.7 (98.1)	42.9 (109.2)	45.8 (114.4)	44.3 (111.7)	40.2 (104.4)	32.9 (91.2)	25.3 (77.5)	17.5 (63.5)	32.4 (90.3)
Daily mean °C (°F)	12.2 (54.0)	14.8 (58.6)	19.2 (66.6)	24.2 (75.6)	28.2 (82.8)	34.2 (93.6)	36.9 (98.4)	35.7 (96.3)	32.1 (89.8)	25.2 (77.4)	18.1 (64.6)	11.7 (53.1)	24.4 (75.9)
Mean daily minimum °C (°F)	4.3 (39.7)	6.9 (44.4)	10.9 (51.6)	15.8 (60.4)	19.8 (67.6)	25.5 (77.9)	28.1 (82.6)	27.2 (81.0)	24.1 (75.4)	17.6 (63.7)	11.0 (51.8)	5.9 (42.6)	16.4 (61.6)
Average precipitation mm (inches)	1 (0.0)	2 (0.1)	3 (0.1)	1 (0.0)	1 (0.0)	0 (0)	0 (0)	1 (0.0)	1 (0.0)	3 (0.1)	2 (0.1)	2 (0.1)	17 (0.5)
Source: climate-data.org

== Transportation ==
Tsabit lies just to the west of the N6 national highway that leads north to Béchar and south to Adrar. It is connected to the N6 highway by two local roads.

== Education ==
3.2% of the population has a tertiary education, and another 9.2% has completed secondary education. The overall literacy rate is 68.6%, and is 82.5% among males and 54.6% among females.

== Localities ==
As of 1984, the commune was composed of 12 localities:

- Ben Talah
- Ghabet Moulay Ali
- Ksabi
- El Habla
- El Maïz
- Oujlane
- Laayad
- Hammad
- Amor
- Brinkene
- Araine er Râs
- Kabertene
