= Charouine District =

Charouine District دائرة شروين
- District
- Location in the former Adrar Province
- Coordinates: 29°1′N 0°16′W
- Country: Algeria
- Province: Timimoun Province
- Capital: Charouine
- Elevation: 266 m (873 ft)

Population (2008)
  - Total: 31,149
- Time zone: UTC+1 (CET)

Charouine District is a district of Timimoun Province, Algeria. According to the 2008 census it has a population of 31,149.

== Communes ==
The district is further divided into 3 communes:

- Charouine
- Ouled Aissa
- Talmine
