= Ksar Draa =

Abandoned fort in Algeria

- قصر دراع (Arabic)
- Location in Algeria
- 29.5348°N 0.1835°E
- Type: Ksar
- Location: Timimoun Province, Algeria

Ksar Draa (also known as Ksar Draa of Timimoun and the Timimoun Citadel) is an abandoned ksar located in the Timimoun Province (formerly part of Adrar Province) of Algeria. It is notable for its isolated location in the Sahara Desert and its uncertain history, and is one of the best preserved ksour in the region.

== Description ==
The structure consists of two circular outer walls of sand, straw and clay, standing approximately 10 metres (33 ft) tall and up to 2 metres (6 ft 7 in) thick. It has a single entrance and no exterior windows. Inside it contained living spaces, communal kitchens and a mosque, spread across three levels.

== Purpose ==
Theories about its original purpose include its use as a hiding place by Jews during times of religious persecution in the Touat, as a caravanserai (lodging place for caravans on the Trans-Saharan trade route), as a military outpost, or as a prison.
