= Aougrout District =

- District
- Location of Aougrout District within the former Adrar Province
- Coordinates: 28°45′N 0°15′E
- Country: Algeria
- Province: Timimoun Province
- Capital: Aougrout
- Elevation: 281 m (922 ft)

Population (2008)
  - Total: 28,869
- Time zone: UTC+1 (CET)

Aougrout District is a district of Timimoun Province, Algeria. According to the 2008 census it has a population of 28,869.

== Communes ==
The district is further divided into 3 communes:

- Aougrout
- Deldoul
- Metarfa
