= Ouled Said =

- Country: Algeria
- Province: Timimoun
- Time zone: UTC+1 (West Africa Time)

Ouled Said (Arabic: أولاد سعيد) is a town in the central region of Algeria, specifically located within Timimoun Province. Established as a municipality in 1985, Ouled Said was formed following its separation from the municipality of Timimoun. The town has experienced consistent demographic growth, as reflected in population statistics from various census years: 1977 (4,990), 1987 (5,898), 1998 (7,538), and 2008 (8,223). The upward trend in population concentration in the municipality remained below the provincial average of Adrar, which was recorded at 92.6% in 2008.

== Geography and Demographics ==
Ouled Said comprises approximately ten scattered villages within an oasis setting. According to local data, the municipality includes 14 villages, such as Ouled Said, Hadj Guelmane, Kali, and others. Each village consists of small farms, with agricultural lands divided among residents.

In terms of agriculture, Ouled Said boasts about 130 hectares of arable land, with 90 hectares being irrigated. The town is home to over 26,400 date palms, showcasing a significant agricultural presence. Despite this, more than a third of the arable land remains uncultivated, attributed to various social and economic factors, including a lack of qualified farmers.

== Historical Context ==
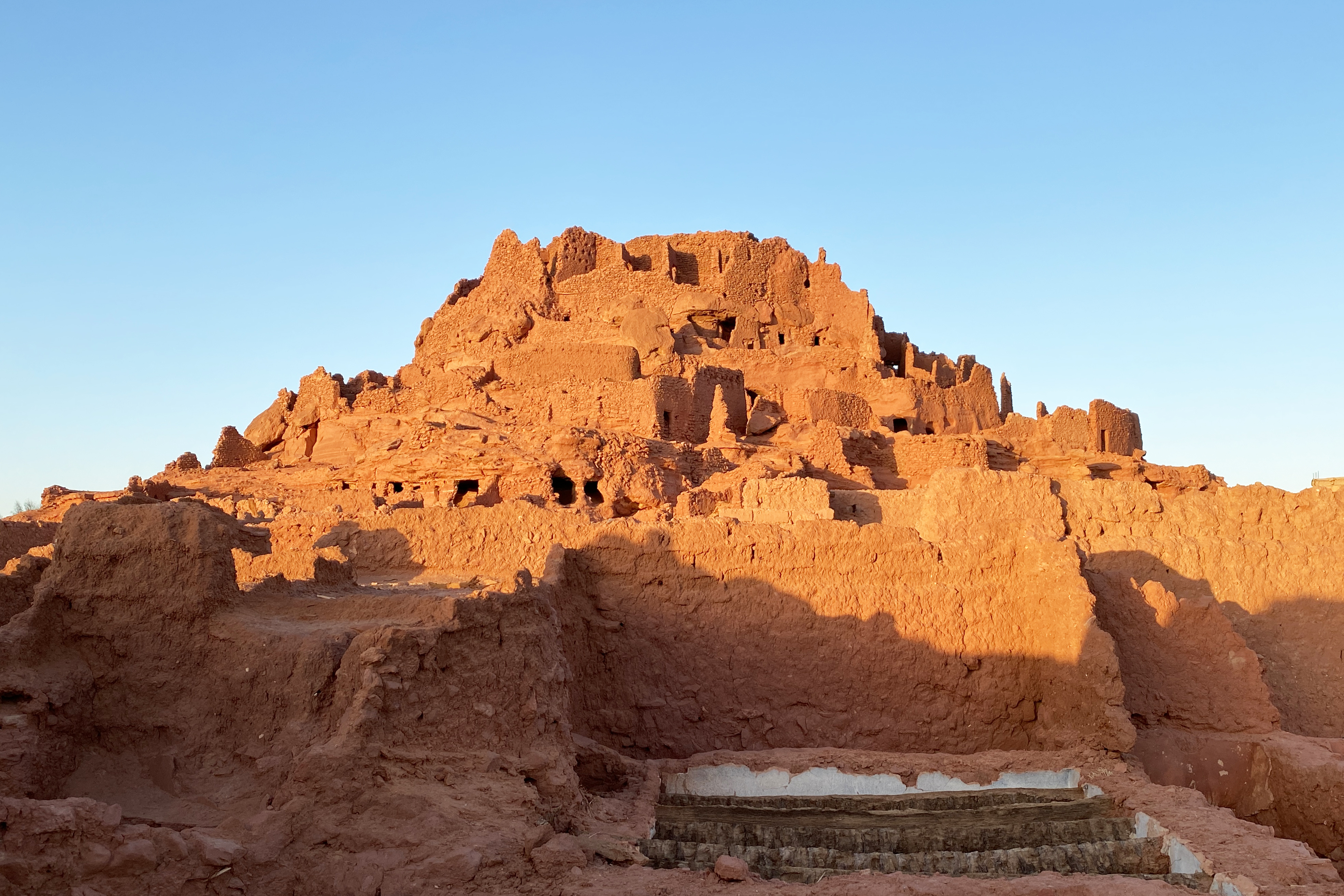
Ksar of Ighzer near Ouled Said

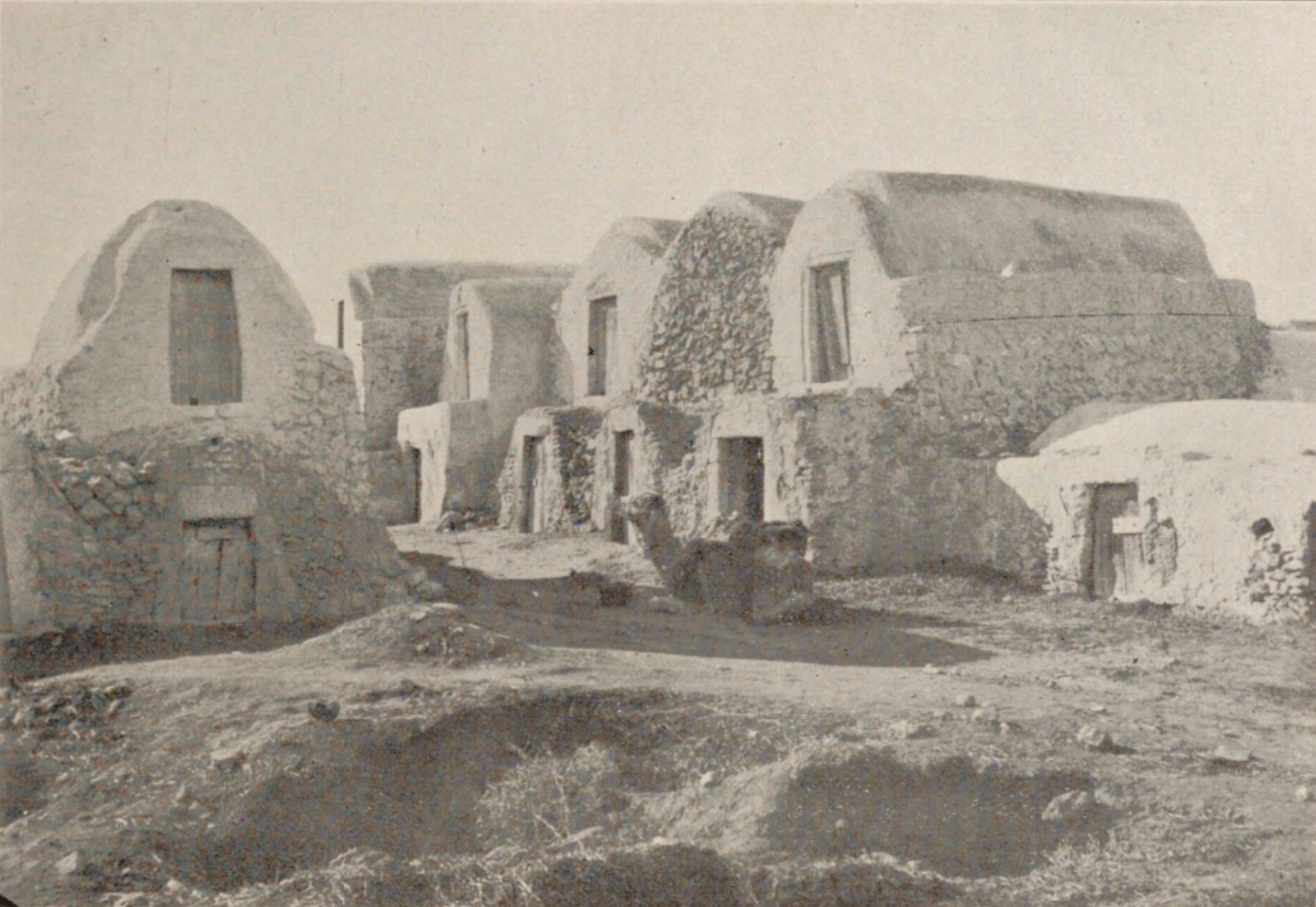
Ouled Saïd in 1912

The area of Ouled Said has a rich historical background, characterized by changes in administration and societal structures. The establishment of the municipality in 1985 marked a turning point in local governance and infrastructure development, leading to the construction of essential facilities such as a municipal office, schools, and healthcare centers.

During the colonial period, inhabitants faced extreme poverty, leading to a cycle of migration in search of better opportunities, particularly in urban areas and oil-rich regions. The establishment of transportation routes further facilitated this migration.

The remains of an abandoned ksar known as Ksar Draa are situated to the northwest of Ouled Said.

== Socio-Economic Changes ==
The introduction of the Agricultural Revolution Law in 1971 significantly altered social structures, theoretically liberating certain social classes while failing to implement land nationalization effectively. This resulted in tensions among landowners and laborers, impacting agricultural productivity.

In the 1990s, improvements in relations between local leaders and the central government led to initiatives aimed at revitalizing local agriculture and restoring traditional irrigation systems. Programs aimed at enhancing agricultural practices and infrastructure have been implemented since the early 2000s.

== Cultural Significance ==
Culturally, Ouled Said is known for maintaining its traditional practices and communal identity. The social fabric is influenced by local religious groups and traditional ceremonies, which continue to play a vital role in community life.
