= Timimoun Province =

Province of Algeria

- Province
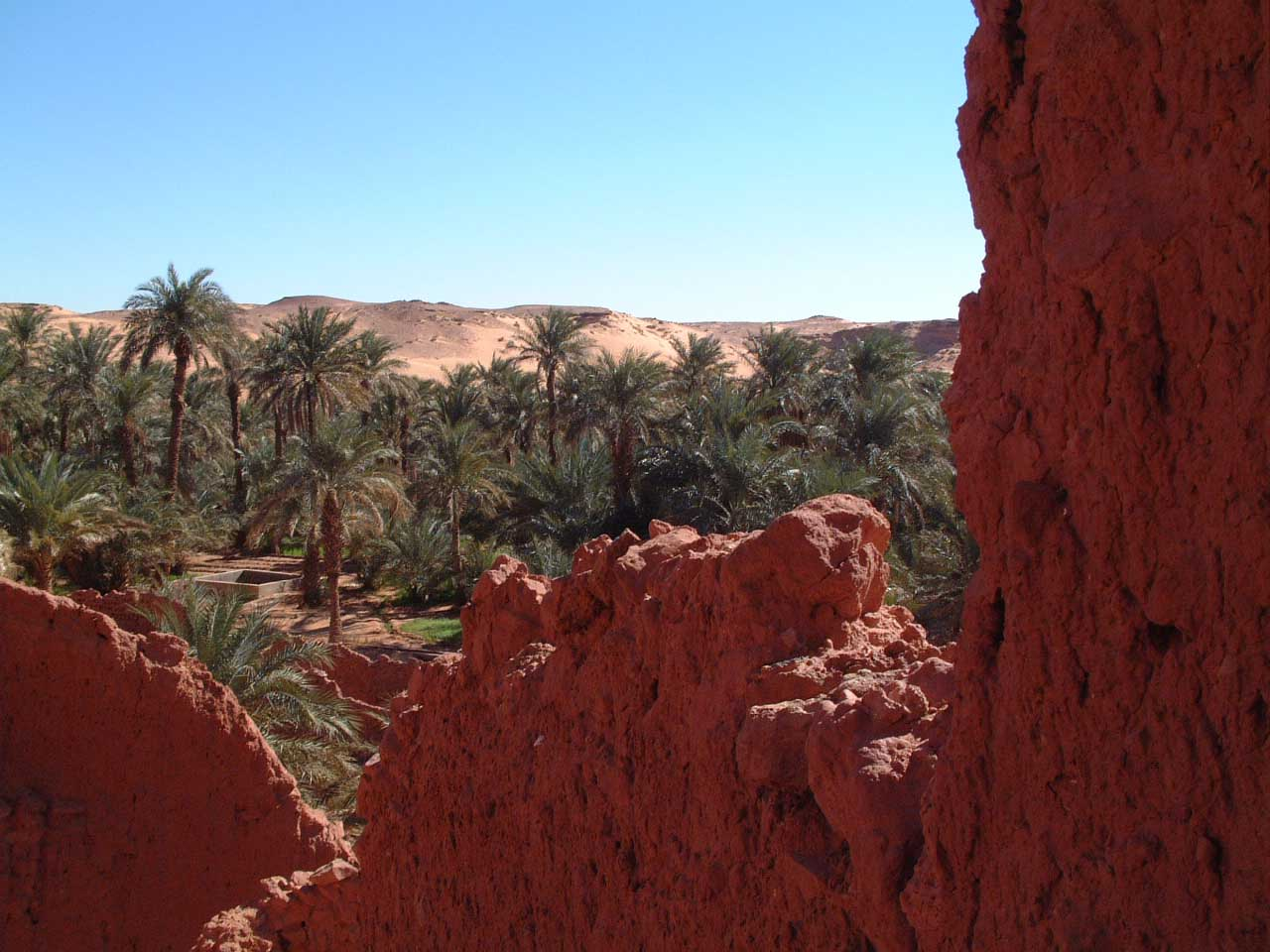

- Map of Algeria highlighting Timimoun
- Coordinates: 29°15′30″N 00°13′50″E
- Country: Algeria
- Capital: Timimoun

Government
  - Wāli: Mabrouk Aoun

Area
  - Total: 65,203 km^{2} (25,175 sq mi)
- Elevation: 276 m (906 ft)

Population (2008)
  - Total: 122,019
  - Density: 1.8714/km^{2} (4.8468/sq mi)
- Time zone: UTC+01 (CET)
- Area Code: +213 (0) 49
- ISO 3166 code: DZ-49
- Districts: 4
- Municipalities: 10

The Timimoun Province (Arabic: ولاية تيميمون Tamazight : ⵓⴳⴻⵣⴷⵓ ⵏ ⵜⵉⵎⵉⵎⵓⵏ) is an Algerian province created in 2019. It was previously a delegated wilaya created in 2015 in the Algerian Sahara.

== Geography ==
The wilaya of Timimoun is in the Algerian Sahara and has an area of 131,220 km².

It is delimited by:

- to the north by the El Bayadh Province;
- to the east by the El Menia Province and In Salah Province;
- to the west by the Béchar Province and Béni Abbès Province;
- and to the south by the Adrar Province.

== History ==
The wilaya of Timimoun was created on November 26, 2019.

Previously, it was a delegated wilaya, created according to the law n° 15–140 of May 27, 2015, creating administrative districts in certain wilayas and fixing the specific rules related to them, as well as the list of municipalities that are attached to it. Before 2019, it was attached to the Adrar Province.

Notable historical sites in Timimoun Province include Ksar Draa, an abandoned ksar of unknown origin in the middle of the desert.

== Organization of the wilaya ==
During the administrative breakdown of 2015, the delegated wilaya of Timimoun is made up of 4 districts and 10 communes.

=== List of walis ===
District	Commune	Arabic
Aougrout District	Aougrout	أوﻗﺮت
Aougrout District	Deldoul	دﻟﺪول
Aougrout District	Metarfa	المطارفة
Charouine District	Charouine	ﺷﺮوﻳﻦ
Charouine District	Ouled Aissa	وﻻد ﻋﻴﺴﻰ
Charouine District	Talmine	ﻃﺎﻟﻤﻴﻦ
Timimoun District	Ouled Said	أولاد السعيد
Timimoun District	Timimoun	ﺗﻴﻤﻴﻤﻮن
Tinerkouk District	Ksar Kaddour	قصر قدور
Tinerkouk District	Tinerkouk	تينركوك
