= Ksar Kaddour =

Coordinates: 29°34′39″N 0°22′26″E

- Location in the former Adrar Province
- Country: Algeria
- Province: Timimoun
- District: Tinerkouk

Population (1998)
  - Total: 3,500
- Time zone: UTC+1 (West Africa Time)

Ksar Kaddour is a town and commune in south-central Algeria. As of the 2019 redistribution, it is located within the Tinerkouk District, Timimoun Province.
