= Timimoun =

- Town and commune
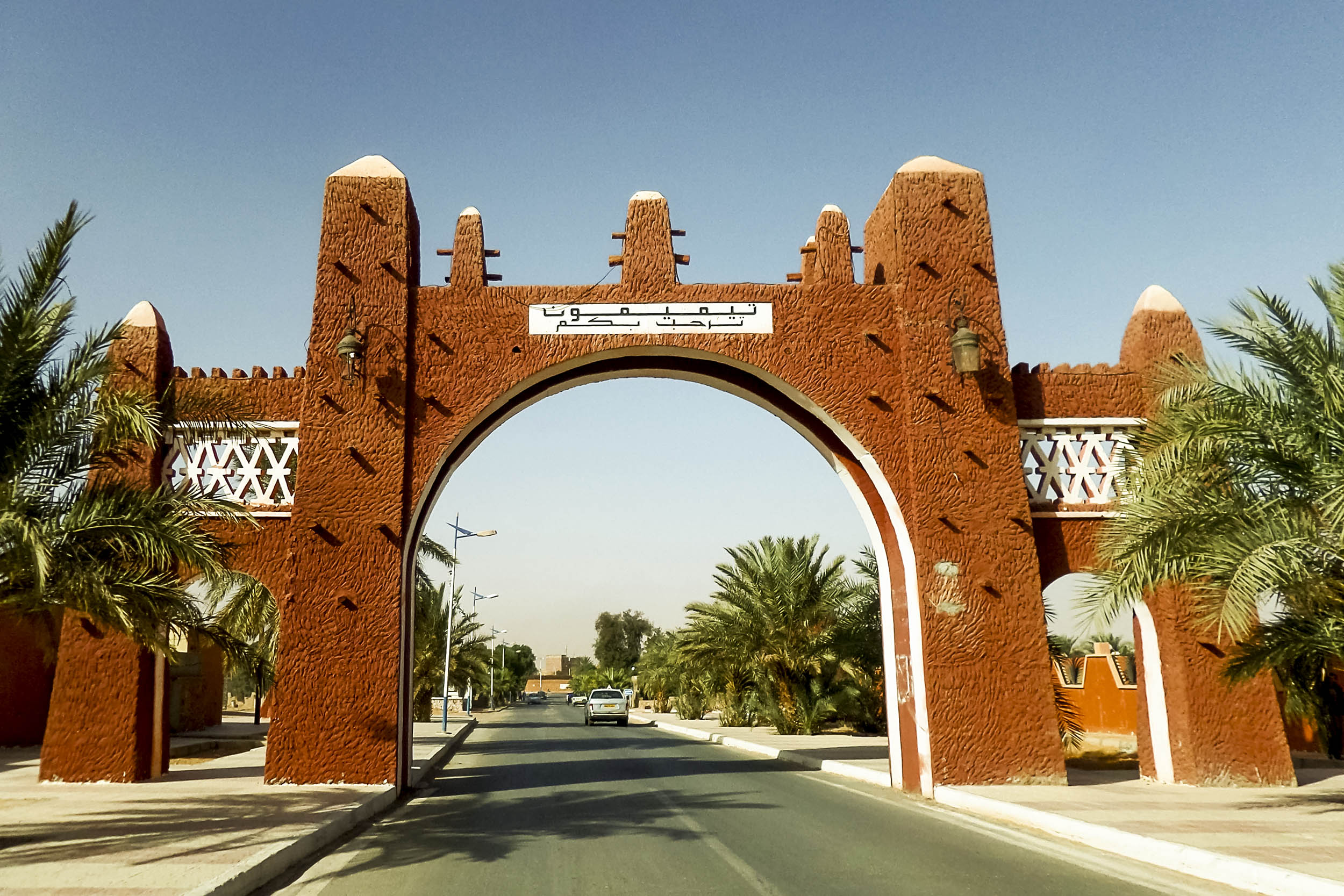
- Entrance of Timimoun

- Location of Timimoun commune within the former Adrar Province

- Location of Timimoun within Algeria
- Coordinates: 29°15′46″N 0°14′20″W
- Country: Algeria
- Province: Timimoun
- District: Timimoun
- Elevation: 288 m (945 ft)

Population (2008)
  - Total: 33,060
- Time zone: UTC+1 (CET)

Timimoun (Tamazight : ⵜⵉⵎⵉⵎⵓⵏ; Arabic: ﺗﻴﻤﻴﻤﻮن) is a town and commune, and capital of Timimoun District, in Timimoun Province, south-central Algeria. According to the 2008 census it has a population of 33,060, up from 28,595 in 1998, with an annual growth rate of 1.5%.

Timimoun is known for the red ochre color of its buildings.

== Geography ==
The town of Timimoun lies at an elevation of around 288 metres (945 ft) in the Gourara region of southern Timimoun Province. It is located on the south-eastern side of an oasis which supports the town's population. A sebkha (salt lake) lies further to the northwest, while the plateau of Tademaït rises to the southeast.

== Climate ==
Timimoun has a hot desert climate (Köppen climate classification BWh), with extremely hot summers and warm winters, with minimal rainfall throughout the year. The annual mean temperature almost reaches 25 °C (77 °F).

Climate data for Timimoun (1991-2020)
Month	Jan	Feb	Mar	Apr	May	Jun	Jul	Aug	Sep	Oct	Nov	Dec	Year
Record high °C (°F)	27.5 (81.5)	37.0 (98.6)	39.1 (102.4)	42.9 (109.2)	46.4 (115.5)	48.6 (119.5)	49.5 (121.1)	48.7 (119.7)	46.2 (115.2)	42.6 (108.7)	36.4 (97.5)	29.4 (84.9)	49.5 (121.1)
Mean daily maximum °C (°F)	19.2 (66.6)	22.1 (71.8)	26.9 (80.4)	31.8 (89.2)	36.8 (98.2)	42.0 (107.6)	45.3 (113.5)	44.0 (111.2)	39.6 (103.3)	32.8 (91.0)	24.8 (76.6)	19.9 (67.8)	32.1 (89.8)
Daily mean °C (°F)	12.0 (53.6)	14.8 (58.6)	19.3 (66.7)	23.9 (75.0)	28.8 (83.8)	33.7 (92.7)	37.0 (98.6)	36.0 (96.8)	32.1 (89.8)	25.5 (77.9)	17.8 (64.0)	13.2 (55.8)	24.5 (76.1)
Mean daily minimum °C (°F)	4.8 (40.6)	7.4 (45.3)	11.6 (52.9)	16.1 (61.0)	20.9 (69.6)	25.5 (77.9)	28.6 (83.5)	28.1 (82.6)	24.6 (76.3)	18.2 (64.8)	10.8 (51.4)	6.4 (43.5)	16.9 (62.4)
Record low °C (°F)	−3.5 (25.7)	−1.2 (29.8)	2.4 (36.3)	7.0 (44.6)	10.0 (50.0)	16.7 (62.1)	20.5 (68.9)	21.6 (70.9)	14.6 (58.3)	9.0 (48.2)	1.6 (34.9)	−2.5 (27.5)	−3.5 (25.7)
Average precipitation mm (inches)	3.6 (0.14)	1.9 (0.07)	2.6 (0.10)	2.8 (0.11)	1.3 (0.05)	0.3 (0.01)	0.2 (0.01)	1.0 (0.04)	2.6 (0.10)	2.2 (0.09)	1.9 (0.07)	1.6 (0.06)	22.0 (0.87)
Average precipitation days (≥ 1 mm)	0.4	0.4	0.6	0.3	0.3	0.1	0.1	0.2	0.6	0.3	0.4	0.3	4.0
Source: NOAA

== Transportation ==
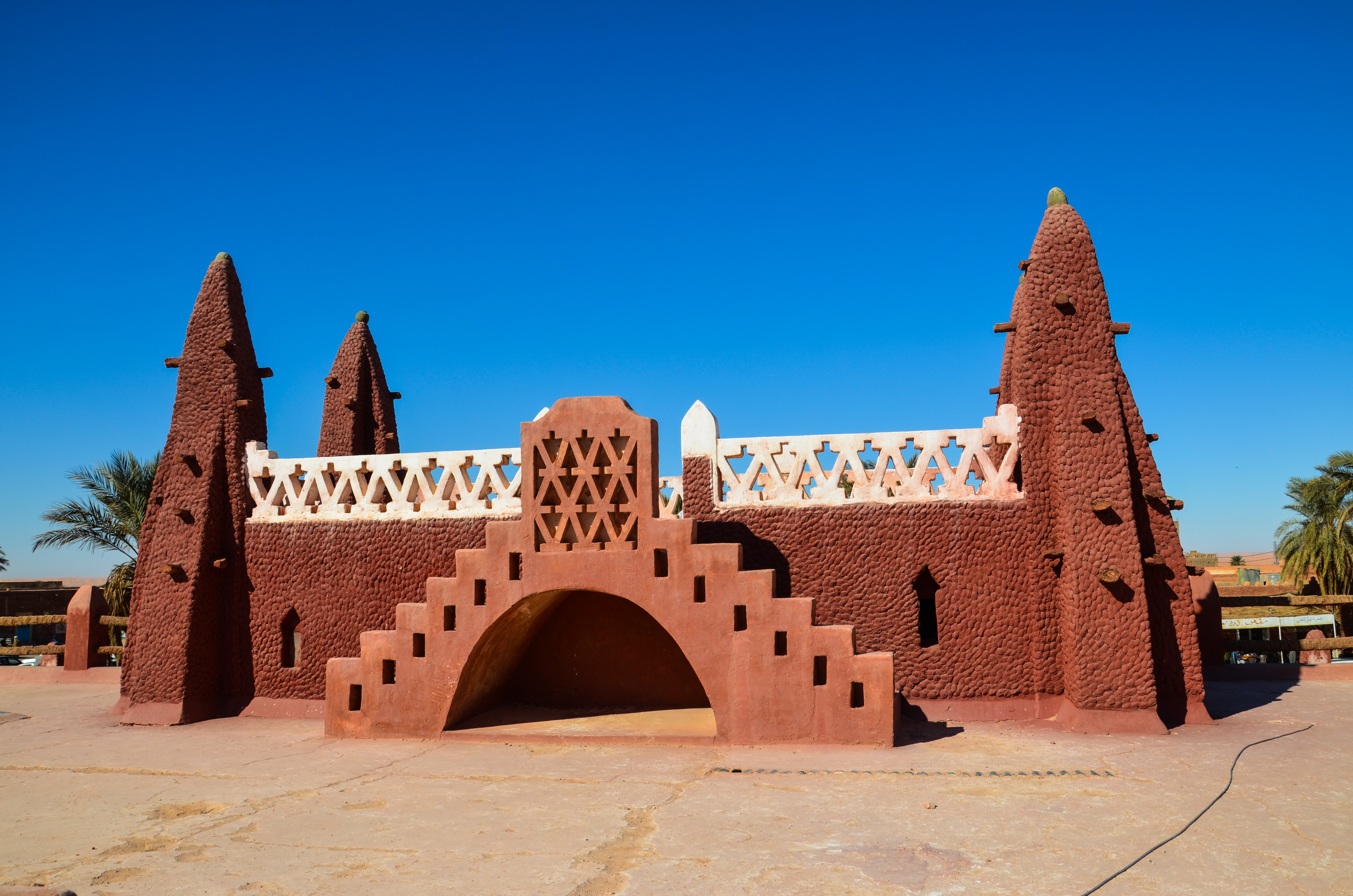
A hotel in Timimoun.

Timimoun lies on the N51 national highway, a road which runs roughly west to east from the N6 (connecting to Béchar in the north and Adrar in the south) to the N1 (connecting from Ghardaïa in the north to In Salah and Tamanrasset in the south). Regional roads also lead south to Aougrout and Deldoul communes, and north to Tinerkouk, Ksar Kaddour and Ouled Said.

Timimoun is served by Timimoun Airport, which is about 5 kilometres (3.1 mi) southeast of the town.

== Education ==
7.0% of the population has a tertiary education, and another 19.3% has completed secondary education. The overall literacy rate is 79.6%, and is 87.5% among males and 71.8% among females.

== Carpets ==
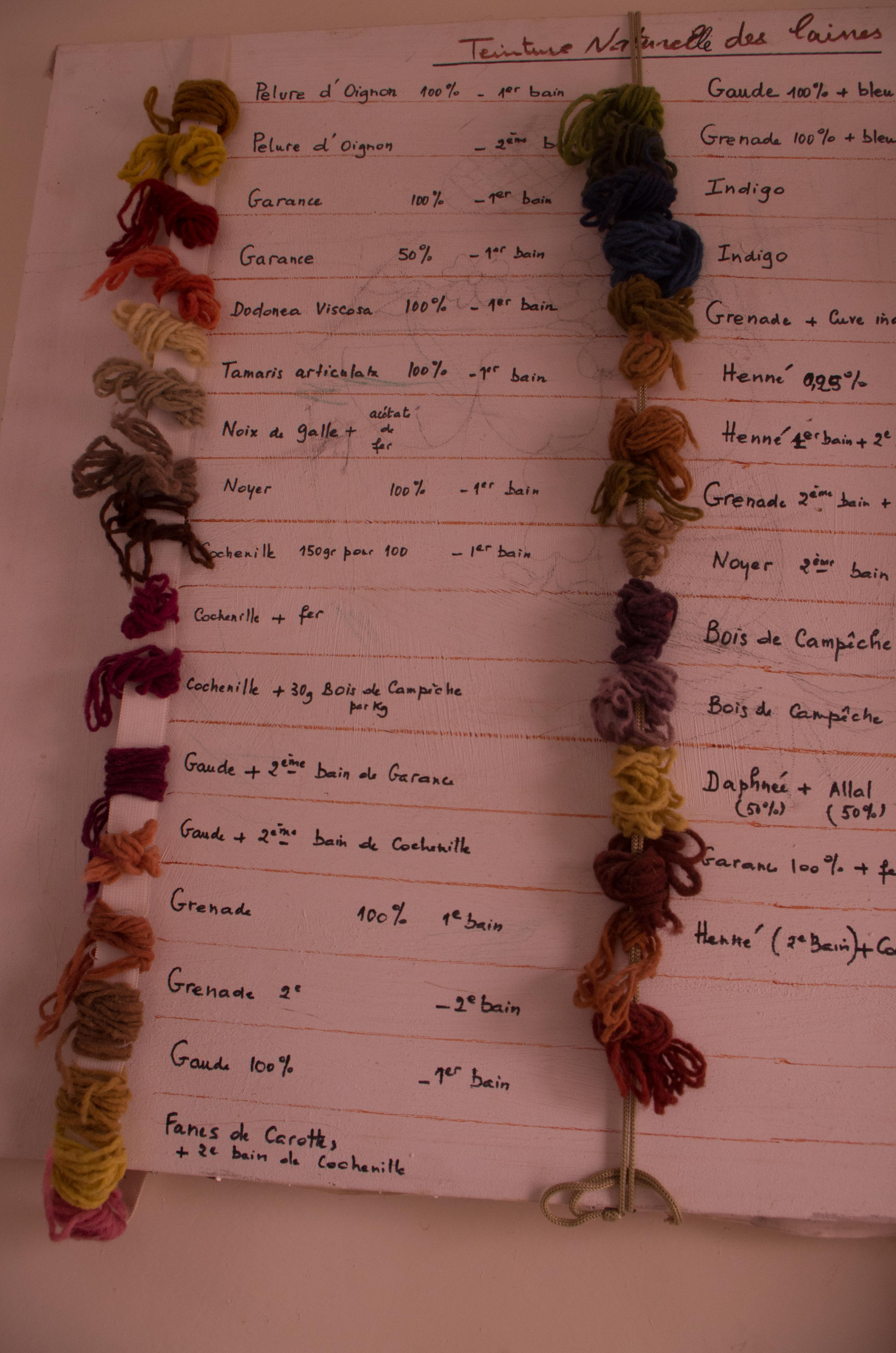

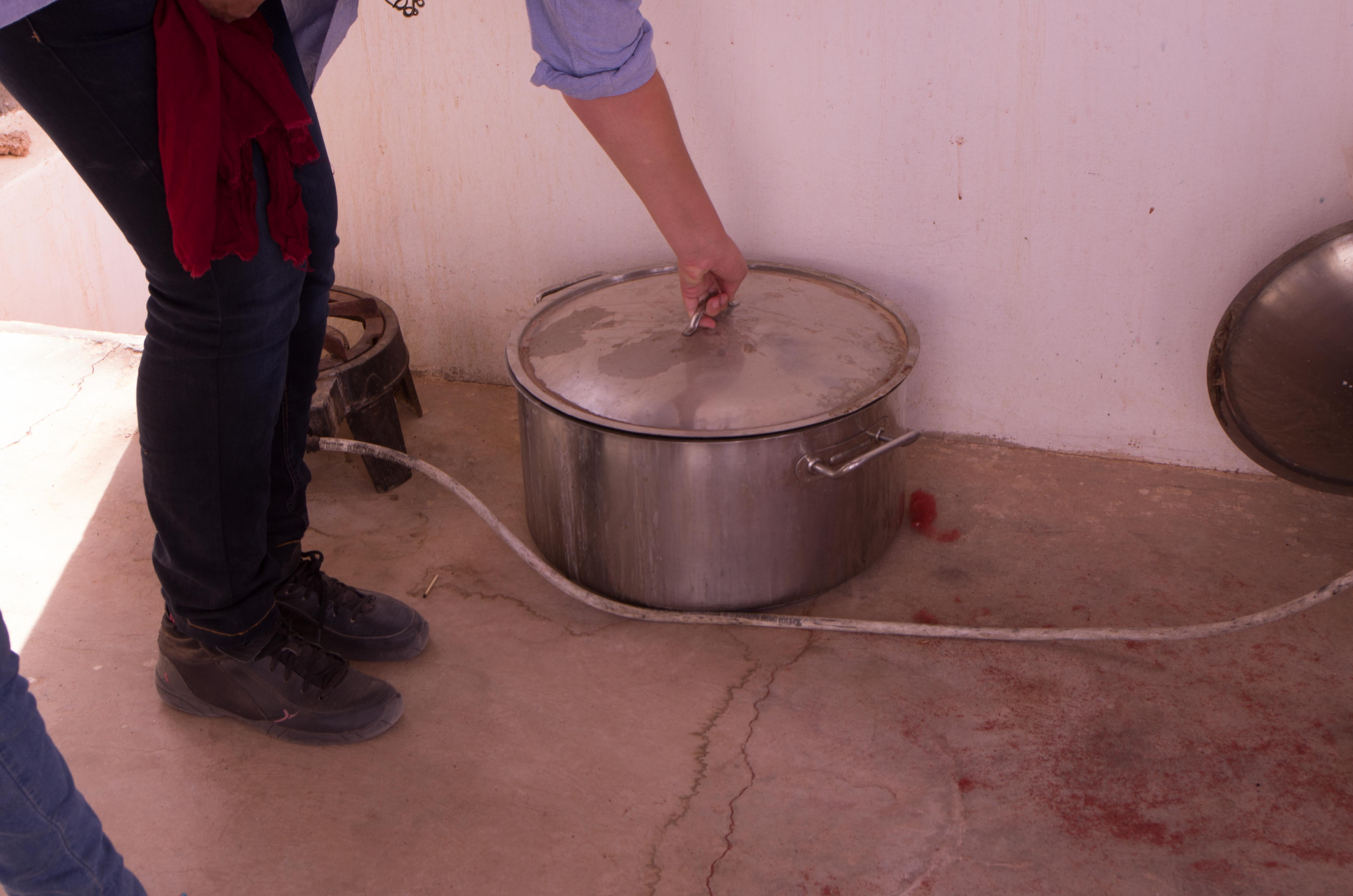

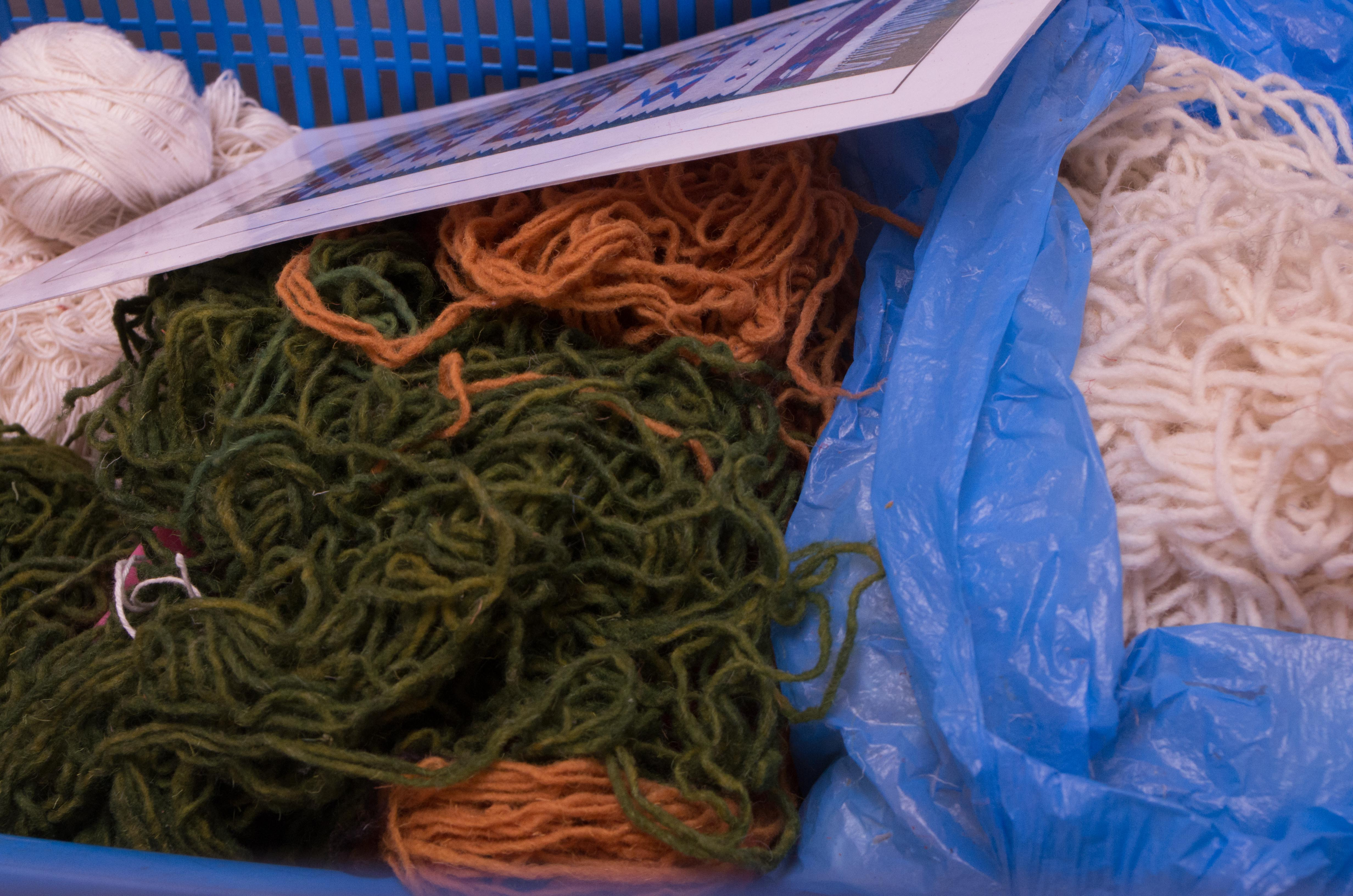

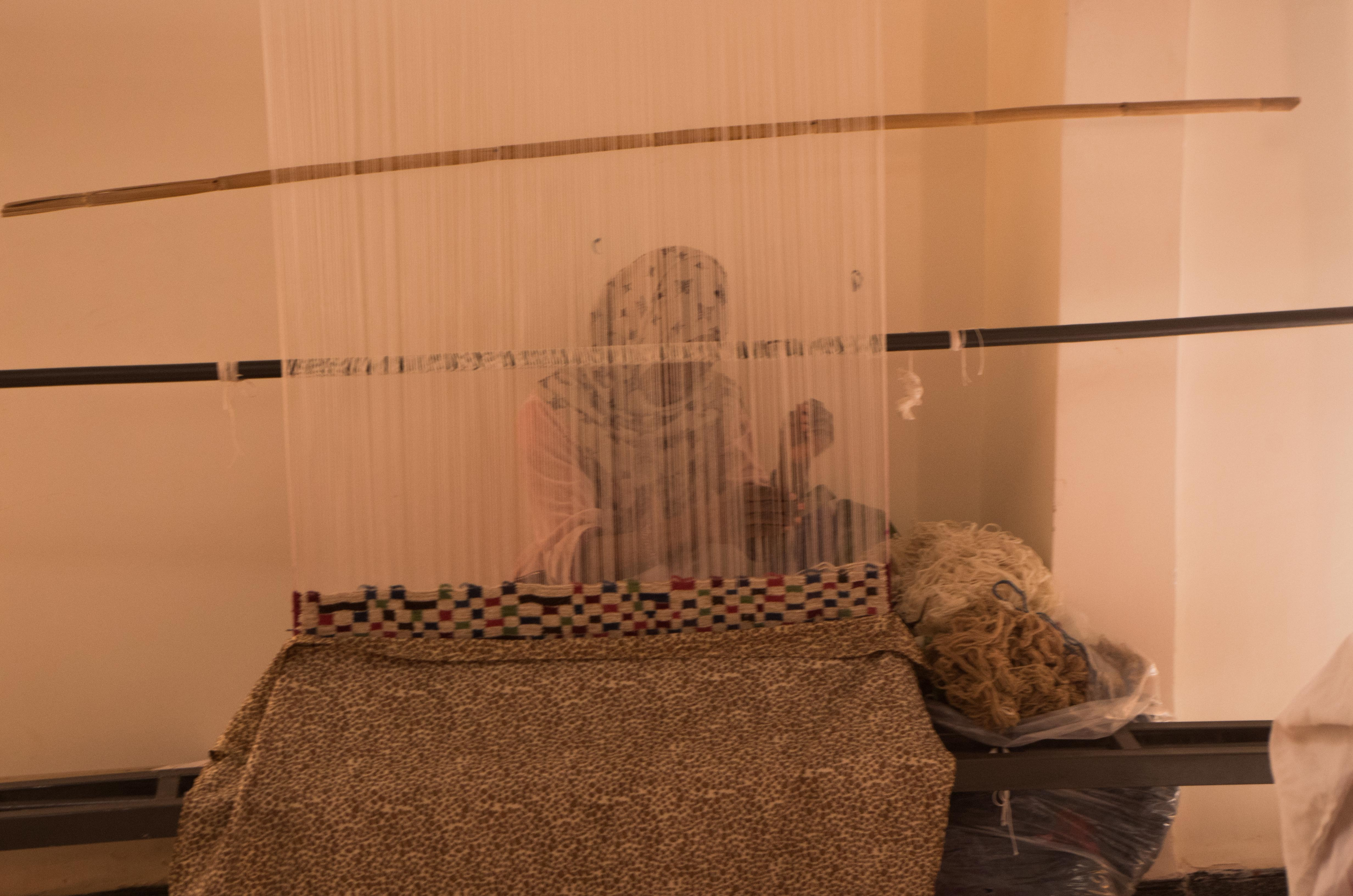

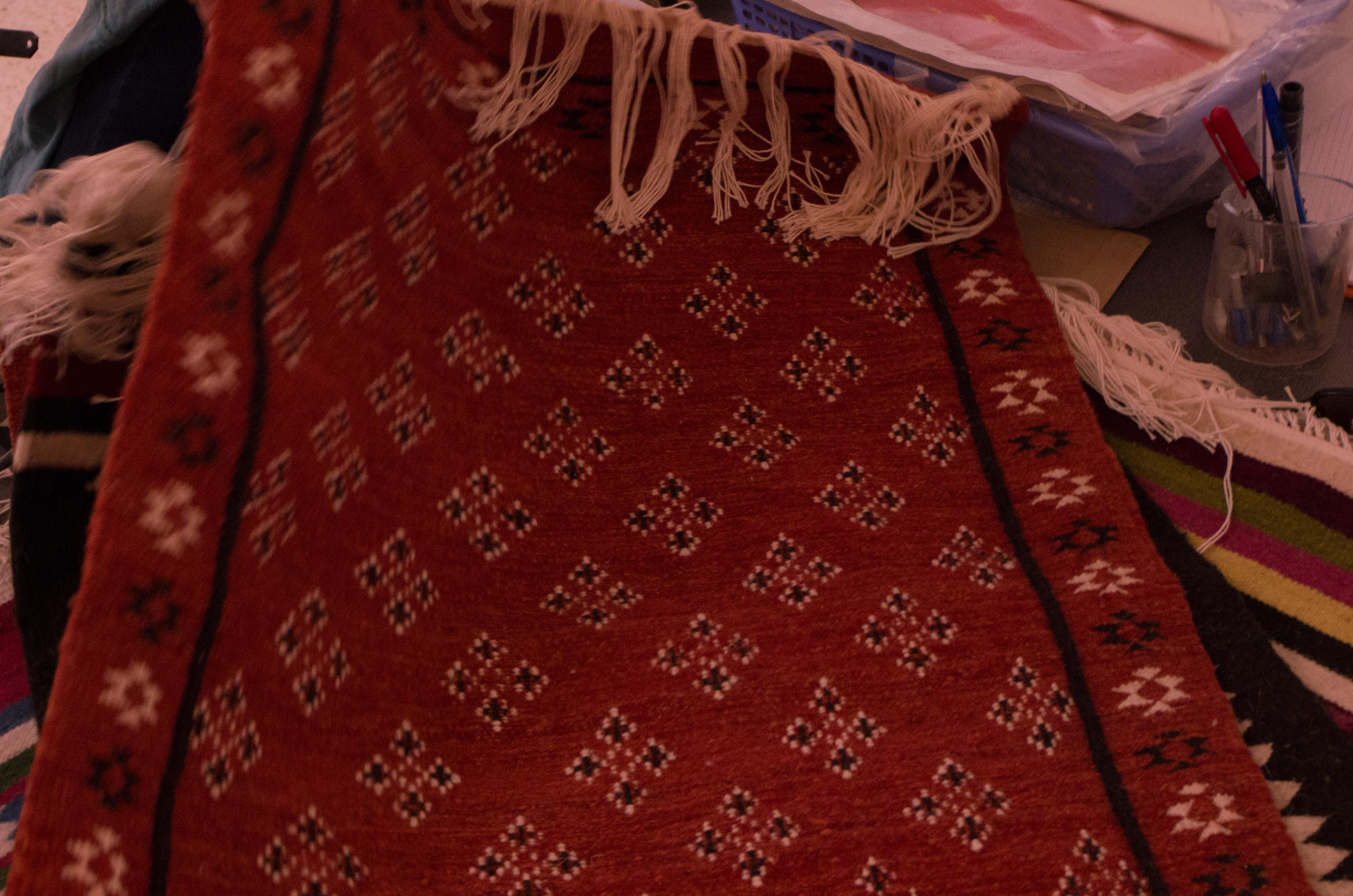

== Localities ==
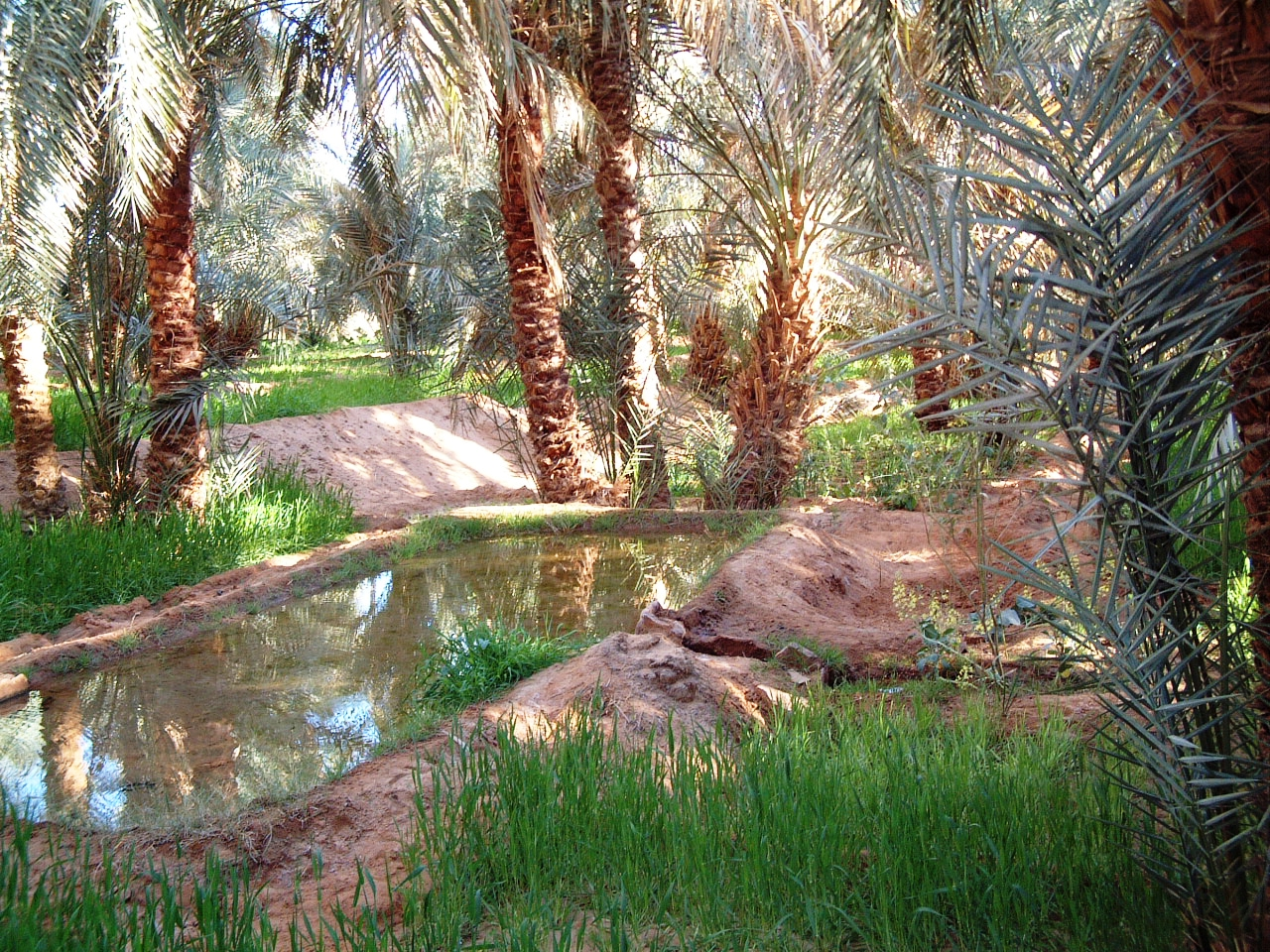
Oasis Timimoun

As of 1984, the commune was composed of 32 localities:

- Timimoun
- Tala
- Tinoumeur
- Bouyahia
- Ouled Nouh
- Zaouiet Sidi Hadj Belkacem
- Beni Melhal
- Beni Mellouk
- Ouadjda
- Taoursit
- Massahel
- Tsmana
- Azekkour
- Tarouaïa
- Alamellal
- Aghiat
- Massine
- El Barka
- Ouamemi
- Amakbour
- Amezgar
- Kef Elkasbah
- Kef Elksar
- Béni Guentour Lahmer
- Samjane
- Taounza
- Hiha
- Yakou
- El Kort
- Tilaghmine
- Timazlane
- Béni Aïssi Sidi Mansour Tganet
