= University of Constantine =

University of Constantine or Constantine University many refer to three universities in Algeria:

- University of Constantine 1, formerly Mentouri Brothers University, established 1969
- University of Constantine 2, or the University of Abdelhamid Mehri, established 2011
- University of Constantine 3, or the University of Salah Boubnider, established 2011
