= 2024 Algerian presidential election =

Re-election of Abdelmadjid Tebboune

- 7 September 2024
- Registered: 24,351,551
- Turnout: 46.10% (▲6.22pp)
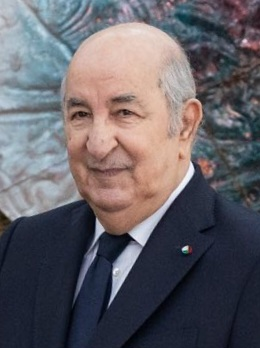

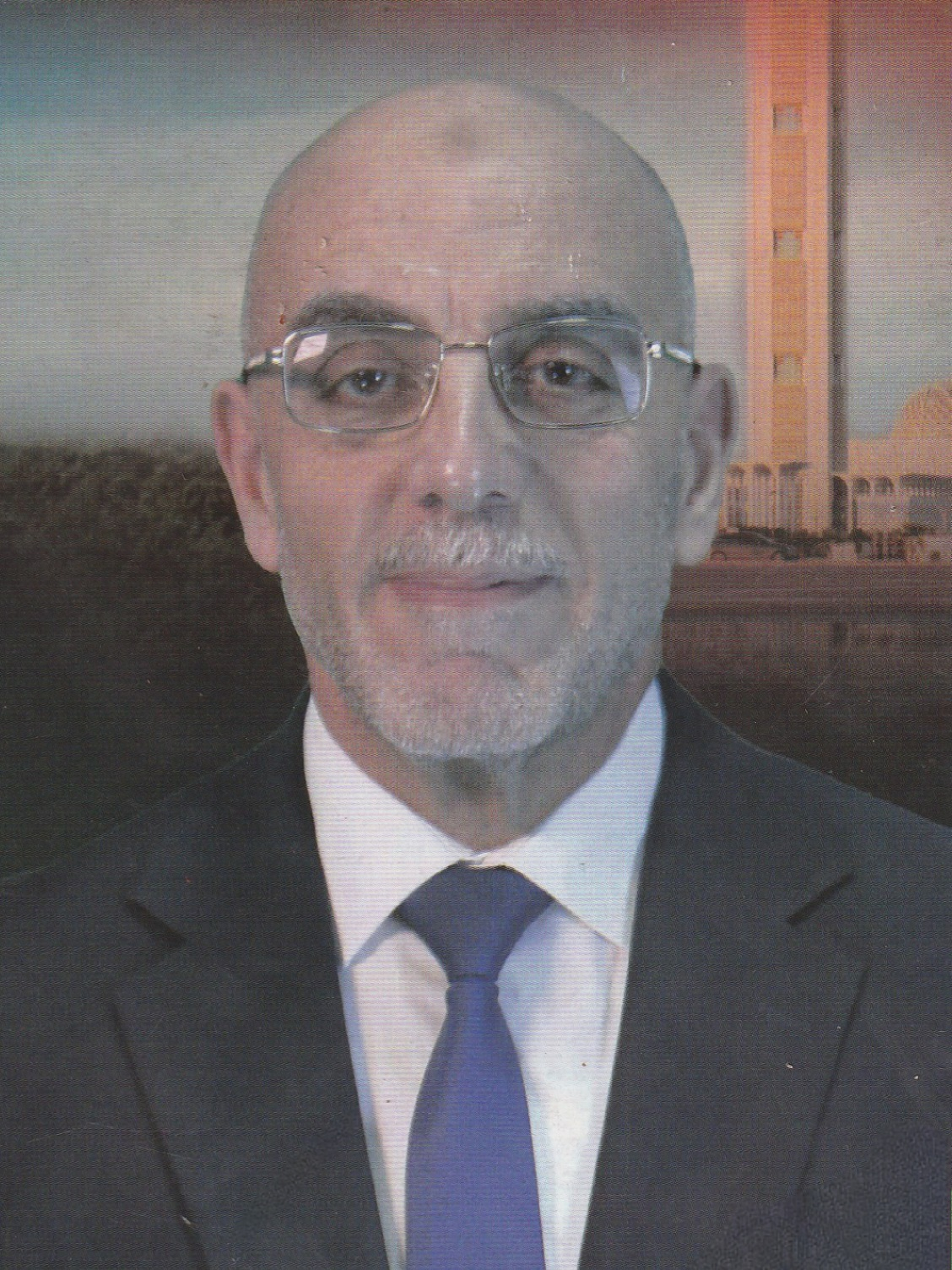

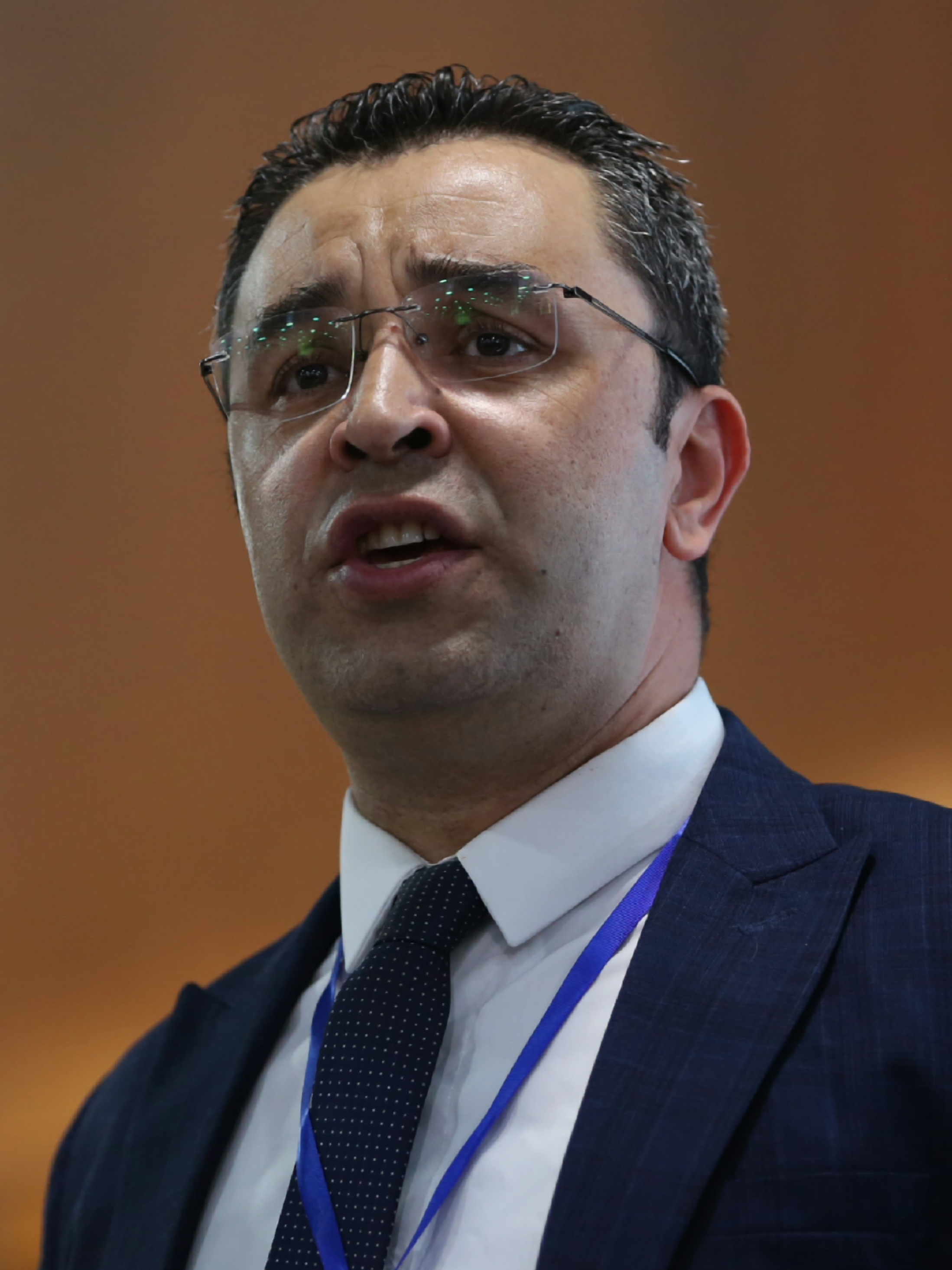
| Nominee | Abdelmadjid Tebboune | Abdelaali Hassani Cherif | Youcef Aouchiche |
| Party | Independent | MSP | FFS |
| Alliance | FLN, RND, MB, FM |
| Popular vote | 7,976,291 | 904,642 | 580,495 |
| Percentage | 84.30% | 9.56% | 6.14% |
- Results by province Tebboune: 50-60% 60-70% 70-80% 80-90% 90+%
President before election
Abdelmadjid Tebboune
Independent
Elected President
Abdelmadjid Tebboune
Independent

Presidential elections were held in Algeria on 7 September 2024. Originally scheduled for December 2024, they were brought forward by President Abdelmadjid Tebboune. Tebboune was challenged by Youcef Aouchiche of the Socialist Forces Front and Abdellah Hassan Cherif of the Movement of Society for Peace. Tebboune won a second term in office. Conflicting reports about the election's turnout by the National Independent Electoral Authority led to criticism from the three candidates. Aouchiche and Cherif challenged the results.

== Background ==
On 21 March 2024 the office of incumbent President Abdelmadjid Tebboune announced that the election would be held on 7 September. This announcement was unexpected, as the election had been anticipated to occur in December as they were in 2019. Tebboune later explained that the date was the optimal time to hold the election "because it coincides with the end of the summer vacations and the start of the new school year", hereby ensuring high turnout. However, some have questioned the logic of the timing, pointing out that a September election would mean that campaigning would be held amid scorching summer temperatures.

Tebboune's selection of the election date was supported by his former political party, the FLN, which said that it was considering whether to endorse Tebboune or field its own candidate. Islamist parties also supported the election date, with Movement of Society for Peace leader Abderrazak Makri expressing interest in running for President, pending the party's decision on a scheduled summit in June. The Socialist Forces Front promised to make the election "an occasion for a great debate", while the Rally for Culture and Democracy described the early election as a "constitutional coup de force" that would force a timeline causing "the de facto exclusion of society as a whole."

Tebboune's decision to set the elections in September also led to confusion among the Algerian public, with the Algerian Arabic phrase Ma fhemna walou (ما فهمنا والو, "We didn't understand anything") becoming a trending topic on social media as a result.

== Electoral system ==
The President of Algeria is elected using the two-round system; if no candidate had received a majority of the vote in the first round, a second round would have been held. Candidates needed signatures from 600 elected officials or from 50,000 members of the public to be listed on the ballot. For this election, there were around 24.5 million registered voters. This election was administered by the National Independent Electoral Authority, which was established in 2019 as a response to demands from pro-democracy protestors. Algeria's Interior Ministry had previously been in charge of elections.

== Candidates ==
On 11 July Abdelmadjid Tebboune announced his decision to run for a second term.

Zoubida Assoul, a lawyer and former magistrate, announced her decision to run for president as the leader of the Union for Reform and Progress (UCP). A total of 34 people expressed their intention to run for the presidency, including Youcef Aouchiche of the Socialist Forces Front, Abdellah Hassan Cherif of the Movement of Society for Peace; and Sadia Naghzi of the General Confederation of Algerian Enterprises. Prospective candidates were required to collect a minimum number of signatures to register their candidacy before 18 July. The number of candidates was subsequently reduced to 15.

On 13 July Louisa Hanoune of the Workers' Party announced her withdrawal of her candidacy as president, citing "unfair conditions".

On 1 August the attorney general of the court of Algiers announced the opening of an in-depth preliminary investigation concerning the sale of sponsorships by more than 50 elected officials to candidates for the presidential election. The prosecution announced that all the candidates involved will be arrested on the basis of the anti-corruption legislation in force.

Only three candidates were allowed to appear on the final ballot: Tebboune, Aouchiche and Cherif.

== Campaign ==
Attendance at campaign events was marred by low turnout due to high summer temperatures. Throughout the election season, Tebboune highlighted his administration's achievements despite corruption and the COVID-19 pandemic in Algeria, while pledging to create 450,000 jobs after he is reelected and raise monthly unemployment benefits for people aged 19 to 40 from 13,000 dinars to 20,000, equivalent to the Algerian minimum wage. Both Hassani and Aouchiche campaigned on allowing greater political and media freedoms, with the latter also promising an amnesty for "prisoners of conscience" and a review of "unjust laws". Although the candidates encouraged people to vote, other activists and political parties called for a boycott.

== Conduct ==
On 21 July a group of 11 opposition figures released an open letter denouncing what they called "the authoritarian climate" surrounding the election, adding that it was a "rubber-stamp" exercise.

Overseas voting, covering around 800,000 Algerians, began on 2 September, while mobile polling stations servicing remote areas of Algeria began operating on 4 September. On 7 September, polling opened at 08:00 and was originally supposed to close at 19:00 before it was extended by an hour. Domestic turnout was estimated to be at around 48%, while turnout in overseas balloting was at 19.6%.

On 8 September opposition candidate Abdelaali Hassani Cherif's campaign stated they recorded instances of voter fraud and election violations, namely that polling station officials inflated the results, failed to deliver vote-sorting records to the candidates' representatives, and instances of proxy group voting.

== Results ==
| Candidate | Party | Votes | % |
|---|---|---|---|
| Abdelmadjid Tebboune | Independent | 7,976,291 | 84.30 |
| Abdelaali Hassani Cherif | Movement of Society for Peace | 904,642 | 9.56 |
| Youcef Aouchiche | Socialist Forces Front | 580,495 | 6.14 |
| Total | | 9,461,428 | 100.00 |
| Valid votes | | 9,461,428 | 84.28 |
| Invalid/blank votes | | 1,764,637 | 15.72 |
| Total votes | | 11,226,065 | 100.00 |
| Registered voters/turnout | | 24,351,551 | 46.10 |
Source: Algeria Press Service

=== By province ===
| Province | Tebboune | | Hassani Cherif | | Aouchiche | | Valid | Invalid/ blank | Total | Registered voters | Turnout |
| Province | Votes | % | Votes | % | Votes | % | Valid | Invalid/ blank | Total | Registered voters | Turnout |
|---|---|---|---|---|---|---|---|---|---|---|---|
| Adrar | 74,004 | 89.26 | 7,179 | 8.66 | 1,730 | 2.09 | 82,913 | 19,440 | 102,353 | 163,106 | 62.75 |
| Aïn Defla | 166,498 | 87.92 | 12,894 | 6.81 | 9,991 | 5.28 | 189,383 | 31,880 | 221,263 | 488,472 | 45.30 |
| Aïn Témouchent | 99,877 | 87.59 | 9,480 | 8.31 | 4,676 | 4.10 | 114,033 | 52,193 | 166,226 | 320,176 | 51.92 |
| Algiers | 479,272 | 86.49 | 42,099 | 7.60 | 32,765 | 5.91 | 554,136 | 103,333 | 657,469 | 1,904,166 | 34.53 |
| Annaba | 125,760 | 85.04 | 14,686 | 9.93 | 7,434 | 5.03 | 147,880 | 46,569 | 194,449 | 433,097 | 44.90 |
| Batna | 263,315 | 90.47 | 18,227 | 6.26 | 9,496 | 3.26 | 291,038 | 71,011 | 362,049 | 673,168 | 53.78 |
| Béchar | 54,853 | 83.79 | 7,294 | 11.14 | 3,320 | 5.07 | 65,467 | 24,764 | 90,231 | 177,384 | 50.87 |
| Béjaïa | 45,312 | 53.89 | 4,108 | 4.89 | 34,662 | 41.22 | 84,082 | 19,424 | 103,506 | 550,728 | 18.79 |
| Béni Abbès | 8,653 | 51.35 | 5,075 | 30.12 | 3,124 | 18.54 | 16,852 | 6,254 | 23,106 | 39,550 | 58.42 |
| Biskra | 143,620 | 84.76 | 18,055 | 10.66 | 7,760 | 4.58 | 169,435 | 22,834 | 192,269 | 397,864 | 48.33 |
| Blida | 198,230 | 88.34 | 17,176 | 7.65 | 8,996 | 4.01 | 224,402 | 50,463 | 274,865 | 695,379 | 39.53 |
| Bordj Badji Mokhtar | 35,073 | 89.89 | 2,085 | 5.34 | 1,859 | 4.76 | 39,017 | 605 | 39,622 | 41,816 | 94.75 |
| Bordj Bou Arréridj | 154,126 | 85.76 | 14,574 | 8.11 | 11,023 | 6.13 | 179,723 | 25,928 | 205,651 | 463,213 | 44.40 |
| Bouïra | 194,942 | 77.48 | 31,143 | 12.38 | 25,518 | 10.14 | 251,603 | 28,456 | 280,059 | 539,190 | 51.94 |
| Boumerdès | 120,440 | 76.08 | 20,851 | 13.17 | 17,010 | 10.75 | 158,301 | 20,203 | 178,504 | 518,060 | 34.46 |
| Chlef | 211,623 | 83.67 | 25,499 | 10.08 | 15,797 | 6.25 | 252,919 | 26,232 | 279,151 | 721,232 | 38.70 |
| Constantine | 128,875 | 80.29 | 19,726 | 12.29 | 11,909 | 7.42 | 160,510 | 86,868 | 247,378 | 599,529 | 41.26 |
| Djanet | 12,793 | 87.25 | 1,168 | 7.97 | 702 | 4.79 | 14,663 | 5,956 | 20,619 | 33,649 | 61.28 |
| Djelfa | 275,129 | 84.38 | 35,459 | 10.87 | 15,479 | 4.75 | 326,067 | 32,162 | 358,229 | 617,778 | 57.99 |
| El Bayadh | 87,180 | 84.67 | 12,464 | 12.10 | 3,322 | 3.23 | 102,966 | 14,638 | 117,604 | 193,439 | 60.80 |
| El Menia | 16,397 | 92.17 | 1,065 | 5.99 | 327 | 1.84 | 17,789 | 6,561 | 24,350 | 44,744 | 54.42 |
| El M'Ghair | 43,707 | 90.61 | 3,851 | 7.98 | 676 | 1.40 | 48,234 | 4,883 | 53,117 | 98,032 | 54.18 |
| El Oued | 99,631 | 83.17 | 14,087 | 11.76 | 6,079 | 5.07 | 119,797 | 16,123 | 135,920 | 268,619 | 50.60 |
| El Taref | 129,501 | 84.95 | 14,808 | 9.71 | 8,132 | 5.33 | 152,441 | 36,644 | 189,085 | 329,971 | 57.30 |
| Ghardaïa | 70,307 | 89.74 | 5,846 | 7.46 | 2,194 | 2.80 | 78,347 | 21,141 | 99,488 | 201,088 | 49.47 |
| Guelma | 110,952 | 87.09 | 11,625 | 9.12 | 4,822 | 3.78 | 127,399 | 33,736 | 161,135 | 363,597 | 44.32 |
| Illizi | 15,796 | 60.86 | 6,023 | 23.21 | 4,136 | 15.94 | 25,955 | 13,698 | 39,653 | 59,789 | 66.32 |
| In Guezzam | 30,328 | 90.91 | 2,312 | 6.93 | 722 | 2.16 | 33,362 | 668 | 34,030 | 34,945 | 97.38 |
| In Salah | 13,787 | 58.78 | 7,118 | 30.35 | 2,549 | 10.87 | 23,454 | 5,161 | 28,615 | 42,789 | 66.87 |
| Jijel | 144,313 | 85.47 | 15,792 | 9.35 | 8,732 | 5.17 | 168,837 | 31,787 | 200,624 | 438,771 | 45.72 |
| Khenchela | 106,217 | 90.37 | 9,481 | 8.07 | 1,833 | 1.56 | 117,531 | 13,657 | 131,188 | 261,156 | 50.23 |
| Laghouat | 122,067 | 85.30 | 14,460 | 10.10 | 6,581 | 4.60 | 143,108 | 50,971 | 194,079 | 300,386 | 64.61 |
| Mascara | 269,096 | 85.04 | 34,428 | 10.88 | 12,896 | 4.08 | 316,420 | 39,152 | 355,572 | 577,173 | 61.61 |
| Médéa | 184,014 | 84.83 | 18,511 | 8.53 | 14,391 | 6.63 | 216,916 | 32,612 | 249,528 | 553,137 | 45.11 |
| Mila | 153,398 | 87.78 | 13,290 | 7.61 | 8,065 | 4.62 | 174,753 | 53,281 | 228,034 | 501,805 | 45.44 |
| Mostaganem | 205,443 | 85.61 | 19,681 | 8.20 | 14,853 | 6.19 | 239,977 | 26,734 | 266,711 | 491,090 | 54.31 |
| M'Sila | 290,449 | 87.85 | 28,699 | 8.68 | 11,460 | 3.47 | 330,608 | 28,424 | 359,032 | 694,103 | 51.73 |
| Naâma | 66,507 | 81.21 | 10,526 | 12.85 | 4,862 | 5.94 | 81,895 | 14,734 | 96,629 | 176,248 | 54.83 |
| Oran | 503,358 | 86.78 | 47,214 | 8.14 | 29,470 | 5.08 | 580,042 | 35,993 | 616,035 | 1,041,580 | 59.14 |
| Ouargla | 75,676 | 84.38 | 9,442 | 10.53 | 4,568 | 5.09 | 89,686 | 11,958 | 101,644 | 204,251 | 49.76 |
| Ouled Djellal | 33,307 | 89.28 | 3,319 | 8.90 | 681 | 1.83 | 37,307 | 11,579 | 48,886 | 107,922 | 45.30 |
| Oum El Bouaghi | 134,672 | 88.12 | 11,522 | 7.54 | 6,633 | 4.34 | 152,827 | 50,488 | 203,315 | 423,053 | 48.06 |
| Relizane | 140,097 | 79.79 | 24,192 | 13.78 | 11,291 | 6.43 | 175,580 | 43,259 | 218,839 | 438,698 | 49.88 |
| Saïda | 105,541 | 87.18 | 10,556 | 8.72 | 4,962 | 4.10 | 121,059 | 23,615 | 144,674 | 247,100 | 58.55 |
| Sétif | 274,976 | 81.24 | 34,351 | 10.15 | 29,147 | 8.61 | 338,474 | 77,860 | 416,334 | 1,026,936 | 40.54 |
| Sidi Bel Abbès | 148,131 | 85.58 | 13,969 | 8.07 | 10,992 | 6.35 | 173,092 | 72,337 | 245,429 | 470,041 | 52.21 |
| Skikda | 195,677 | 83.37 | 22,877 | 9.75 | 16,161 | 6.89 | 234,715 | 53,219 | 287,934 | 622,552 | 46.25 |
| Souk Ahras | 125,960 | 90.71 | 7,846 | 5.65 | 5,054 | 3.64 | 138,860 | 14,707 | 153,567 | 325,477 | 47.18 |
| Tamanrasset | 37,737 | 82.56 | 6,737 | 14.74 | 1,233 | 2.70 | 45,707 | 17,318 | 63,025 | 111,771 | 56.39 |
| Tébessa | 230,590 | 85.44 | 25,096 | 9.30 | 14,197 | 5.26 | 269,883 | 21,840 | 291,723 | 477,280 | 61.12 |
| Tiaret | 188,260 | 72.10 | 44,844 | 17.17 | 27,998 | 10.72 | 261,102 | 26,943 | 288,045 | 570,766 | 50.47 |
| Timimoun | 28,763 | 75.98 | 6,998 | 18.49 | 2,094 | 5.53 | 37,855 | 8,328 | 46,183 | 76,965 | 60.01 |
| Tindouf | 39,823 | 73.30 | 8,110 | 14.93 | 6,397 | 11.77 | 54,330 | 24,705 | 79,035 | 113,558 | 69.60 |
| Tipaza | 130,397 | 85.02 | 14,697 | 9.58 | 8,273 | 5.39 | 153,367 | 48,331 | 201,698 | 445,342 | 45.29 |
| Tissemsilt | 62,509 | 84.75 | 7,966 | 10.80 | 3,282 | 4.45 | 73,757 | 18,713 | 92,470 | 177,555 | 52.08 |
| Tizi Ouzou | 66,452 | 59.40 | 9,394 | 8.40 | 36,027 | 32.20 | 111,873 | 16,528 | 128,401 | 682,298 | 18.82 |
| Tlemcen | 291,947 | 86.87 | 32,997 | 9.82 | 11,111 | 3.31 | 336,055 | 44,678 | 380,733 | 746,874 | 50.98 |
| Touggourt | 64,329 | 89.39 | 6,583 | 9.15 | 1,049 | 1.46 | 71,961 | 14,787 | 86,748 | 167,603 | 51.76 |
| Algerian diaspora | 146,604 | 90.67 | 5,087 | 3.15 | 9,992 | 6.18 | 161,683 | 8,271 | 169,954 | 865,490 | 19.64 |
| Total | 7,976,291 | 84.30 | 904,642 | 9.56 | 580,495 | 6.14 | 9,461,428 | 1,764,637 | 11,226,065 | 24,351,551 | 46.10 |
Source: Official Journal

== Aftermath ==
On 10 September, Cherif and Aouchiche filed an appeal at the Constitutional Court of Algeria challenging the results. On 14 September, the court ruled that Tebboune had won the election but found that his share of the vote was lower than initially announced, receiving 84% of the vote instead of around 95%. A record 16% of votes cast were invalid or blank.

Tebboune was inaugurated for his second term on 17 September.
