= Algeria–Mali border =

International border

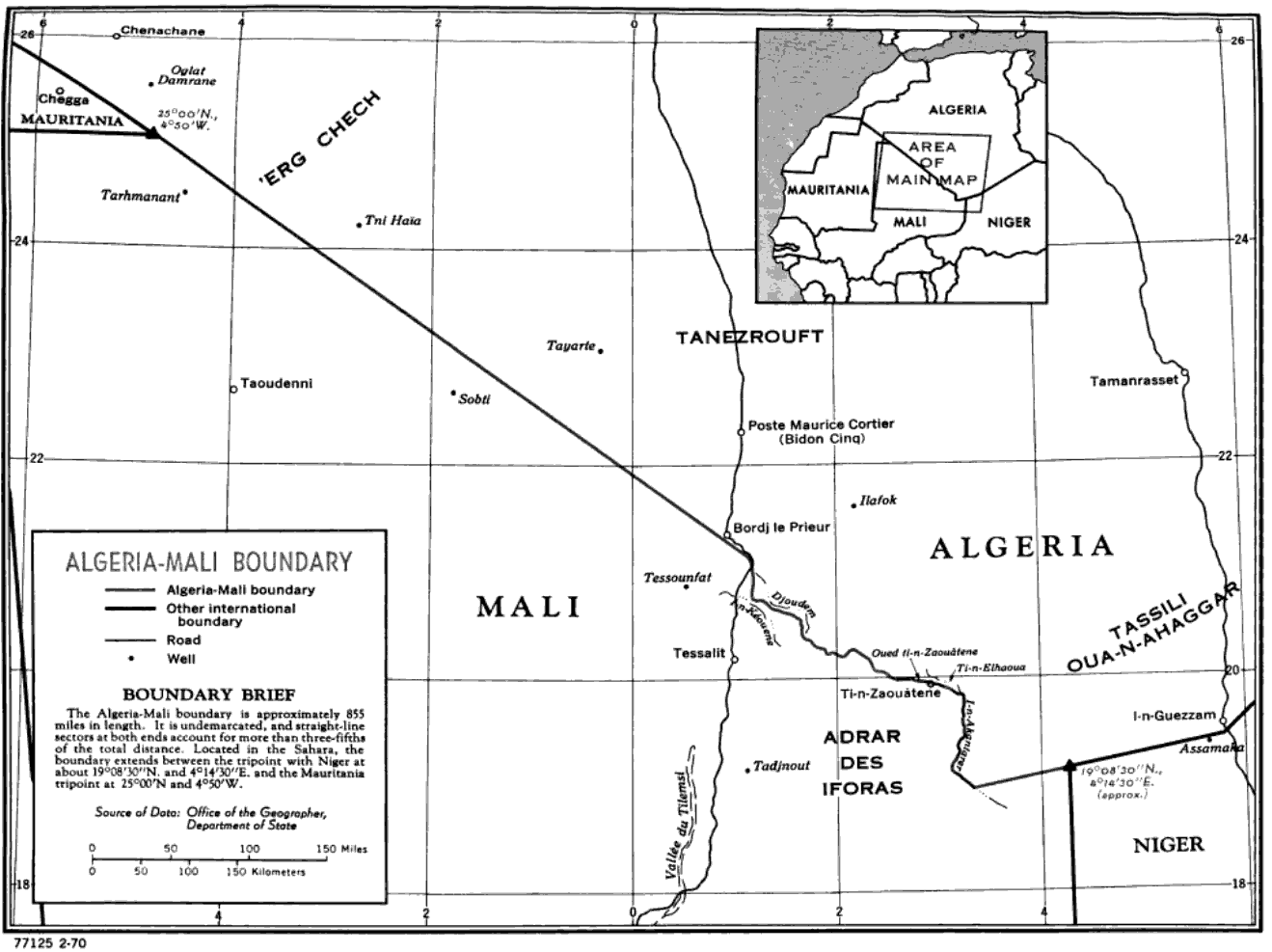
Map of the Algeria-Mali border

The Algeria–Mali border is 1,359 km (844 mi) long from the tripoint with Mauritania in the northwest to the tripoint with Niger in the southeast.

== Description ==
The border begins in the west at the tripoint with Mauritania, and is a continuation of the NW-SE straight line that forms the Algeria–Mauritania border. This straight line runs for circa 752 km (467 m). Just north of the 21st parallel north the border shifts southward, proceeding to the southeast via a series of irregular lines and the Tin-Zaouatene and I-n-Akantarer wadis, before turning to the northeast where a straight line connects up to the tripoint with Niger. The border lies entirely within the Sahara desert.

== History ==
In the French conquest of Algeria, most of northern Algeria was taken by France, during the period 1830-47, incorporating it as an integral part of France. The 1880s saw an intense competition between the European powers for territories in Africa, a process known as the Scramble for Africa. The process culminated in the Berlin Conference of 1884, in which the European nations concerned agreed upon their respective territorial claims and the rules of engagement going forward. As a result of this France gained control of the upper valley of the Niger River (roughly equivalent to the areas of modern Mali and Niger). France occupied this area in 1900; Mali (then referred to as French Sudan) was originally included, along with modern Niger and Burkina Faso, within the Upper Senegal and Niger colony. It was later split off and became a constituent of the federal colony of French West Africa (Afrique occidentale française).

In the meantime the French had been pushing south from the Algerian littoral, conquering much of the Algerian Sahara in 1902. A boundary between French West Africa and French Algeria (i.e. Algeria’s modern borders with Mauritania, Mali and Niger) was agreed on 7 June 1905 by the Commandant of Upper Senegal and Niger and the Military Commander of the Département des Oasis within French Algeria. The border was further defined by the Niamey Convention of June 1909.

As the movement for decolonisation grew in the post-Second World War era, France gradually granted more political rights and representation for their sub-Saharan African colonies, culminating in the granting of broad internal autonomy to French West Africa in 1958 within the framework of the French Community. Eventually, in 1960, Mali was granted full independence. The situation in Algeria proved much more difficult, owing to the large community of French settlers in Algeria, and independence was only granted in 1962 after a bloody war. At that point the Algeria–Mali border became an international frontier between two sovereign states.

In recent years Algeria has boosted its military presence along the border owing to the instability in northern Mali as a result of the Mali War and the generally poor state of security in the Sahara region.

In September 2025, Mali filed a case in the International Court of Justice against Algeria over the latter's shootdown of a Malian military drone in the vicinity of the border town of Tinzaouaten on 31 March.

== Settlements ==
=== Algeria ===
- Timiaouine
- Bordj Badji Mokhtar

=== Mali ===
- Tarmanant
- Boghassa
- Tinzaouaten

== Crossings ==
The main border crossing is located between Bordj Badji Mokhtar (ALG) and Tessalit (MLI). Travel to the border region is generally discouraged by third-party governments at present owing to the poor security situation.

== See also ==
- Algeria–Mali relations
