= UAMC =

UAMC can mean:

- The University of Arizona Medical Center, a hospital in Tucson, Arizona
- The Université Constantine 2, a university in Algeria also known as the Université Abdelhamid Mehri de Constantine
