= Zoubida =

Zoubida is a feminine given name of Arabic origin. Notable people with the name include:

== Given name ==
- Zoubida Assoul (born 1956), Algerian lawyer and politician
- Zoubida Bouazoug (born 1976), Algerian judoka
- Zoubida Laayouni (born 1956), Moroccan discus thrower
