= Tnihaia =

- Coordinates: 24°14′N 2°58′W

Tnihaia, also written Tni Haia, is a remote settlement in the Sahara Desert of south-western Algeria. It is located within the Bordj Badji Mokhtar District, under Adrar Province in the Erg Chech Desert.

It was visited by French explorers Charles de Foucauld and François-Henry Laperrine.
