= Bordj Badji Mokhtar =

Bordj Badji Mokhtar ﺑﺮج ﺑﺎﺟﻰ ﻣﺨﺘﺎر
- Town and commune
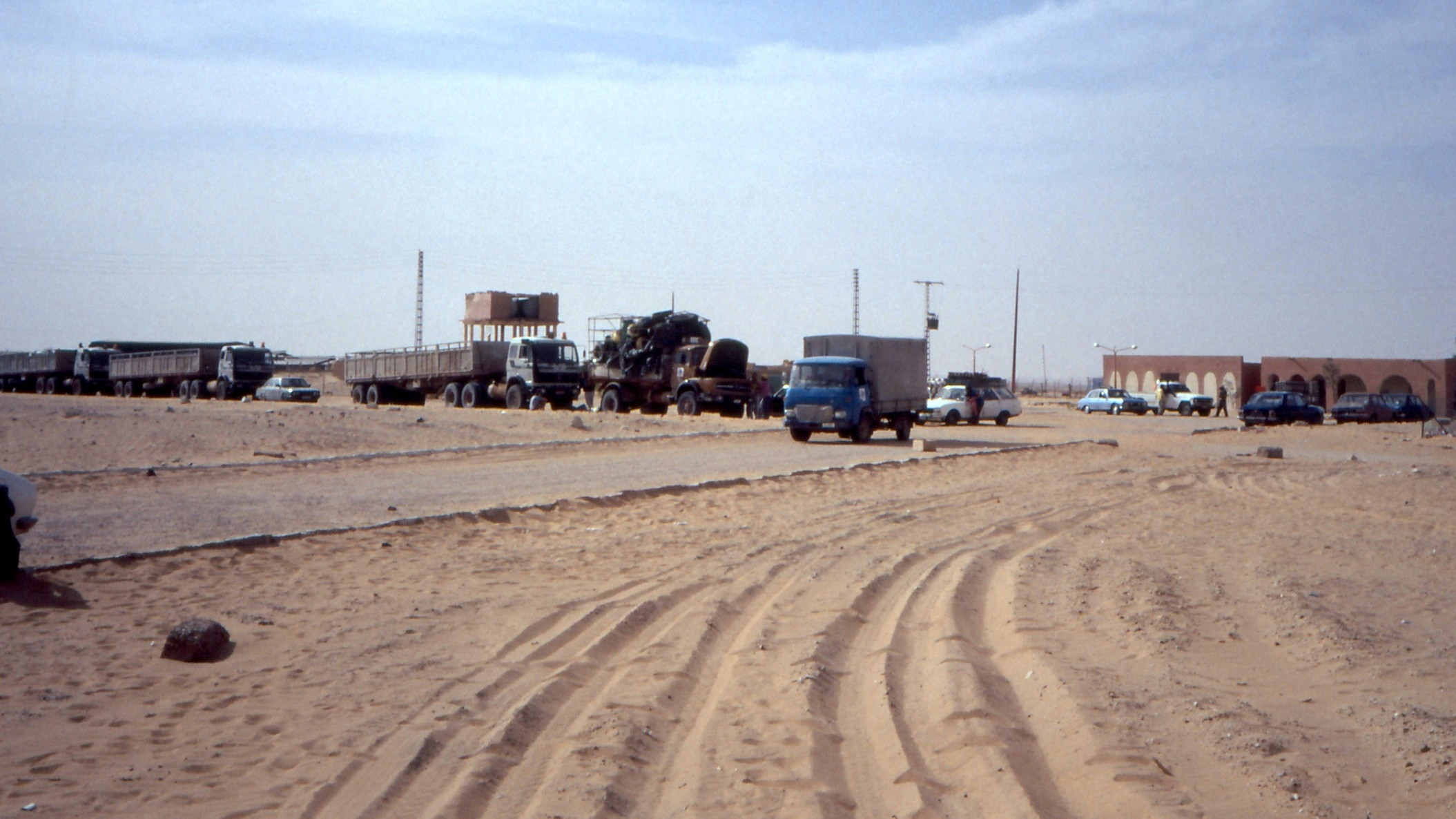
- Bordj Badji Mokhtar in 1990.

- Location of Bordj Badji Mokhtar commune within Adrar Province
- Coordinates: 21°19′44″N 0°57′15″E
- Country: Algeria
- Province: Bordj Badji Mokhtar
- District: Bordj Badji Mokhtar
- Elevation: 401 m (1,316 ft)

Population (2008)
  - Total: 16,437
- Time zone: UTC+1 (CET)

Bordj Badji Mokhtar (Arabic: برج باجي مختار) is a town and commune in Bordj Badji Mokhtar District, Bordj Badji Mokhtar Province, in south-western Algeria. According to the 2008 census it has a population of 16,437, up from 9,323 in 1998, with an annual growth rate of 6.0%, the highest in the province. It was named after the Algerian independence activist Badji Mokhtar (1919–1954). The inhabitants are mainly Tuaregs.

The Prime Meridian passes near Bordj Badji Mokhtar.

The vegetation is concentrated at the bottom of the wadis and valleys. Fauna includes gazelles, jackals, doves, reptiles, rodents and trapja but the domestic animals include goats, sheep, camels and donkeys.

== History ==
The town has its origins in the border guard thwarted by French settlers. Bordj Badji Mokhtar municipality comprises two villages and four nomadic groups.

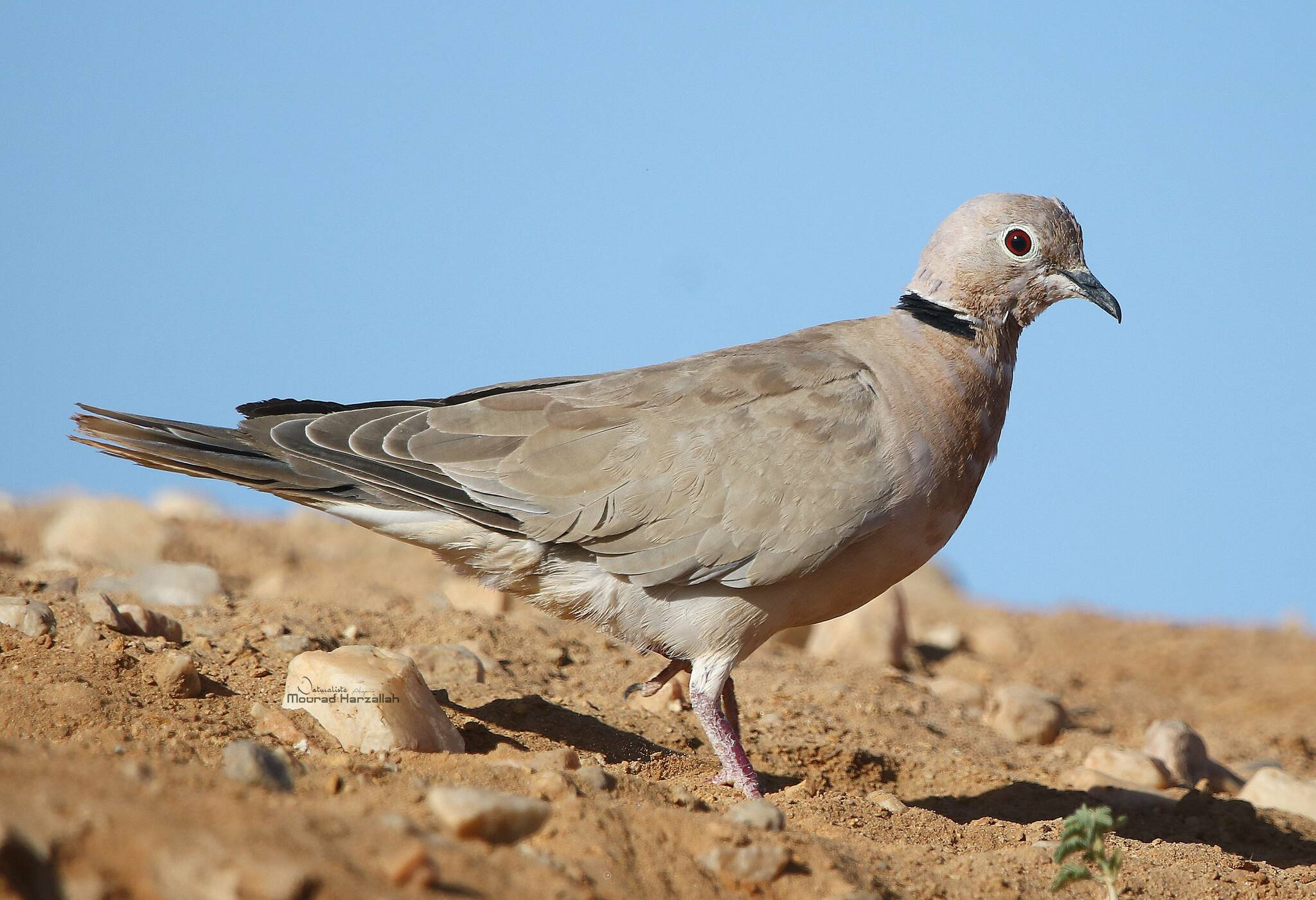
An African Collared Dove in Bordj Badji Mokhtar

== Geography ==
Bordj Badji Mokhtar is located at an elevation of 401 metres (1,316 ft) in the Tanezrouft, a desolate and mostly flat area in the Sahara Desert. The region is extremely sparsely populated with only four significant settlements in the Algerian part (the other three being Timiaouine, In Guezzam and Tin Zaouatine). Unlike most other towns in Saharan Algeria, Bordj Badji Mokhtar is not settled near an oasis but water is available from wells dug 400 metres (1,300 ft) underground.

== Localities ==
As of 1984, the commune was composed of one locality:

- Bordj Badji Mokhtar

The municipality is bordered by Tinzawatène in the Abeïbara district to the east and Abeïbara to the south, by the municipality of Tessalit in the Tessalit district to the west and by Algerie to the north. The area includes the Essely mountain range and the Edekil and Tadalok valleys.

== Climate ==
Bordj Badji Mokhtar has a hot desert climate (Köppen climate classification BWh), with long, extremely hot summers and short but warm winters, and very little rainfall throughout the year as the town only averages 50 mm (2.0 in) of rainfall. Occasional showers and thunderstorms do occur from July to September due as the town falls under the far northern edge of influence of the West African Monsoon.

Climate data for Bordj Badji Mokhtar (1991-2020 normals and extremes)
Month	Jan	Feb	Mar	Apr	May	Jun	Jul	Aug	Sep	Oct	Nov	Dec	Year
Record high °C (°F)	38.0 (100.4)	41.4 (106.5)	42.5 (108.5)	46.0 (114.8)	47.4 (117.3)	49.0 (120.2)	48.2 (118.8)	47.2 (117.0)	45.5 (113.9)	43.5 (110.3)	40.2 (104.4)	34.8 (94.6)	49.0 (120.2)
Mean daily maximum °C (°F)	25.7 (78.3)	28.9 (84.0)	33.1 (91.6)	37.9 (100.2)	41.5 (106.7)	44.0 (111.2)	43.6 (110.5)	42.4 (108.3)	41.8 (107.2)	38.1 (100.6)	31.9 (89.4)	27.3 (81.1)	36.4 (97.4)
Daily mean °C (°F)	17.0 (62.6)	19.9 (67.8)	24.2 (75.6)	29.1 (84.4)	33.3 (91.9)	36.4 (97.5)	36.3 (97.3)	35.3 (95.5)	34.4 (93.9)	30.0 (86.0)	23.5 (74.3)	18.8 (65.8)	28.2 (82.7)
Mean daily minimum °C (°F)	8.3 (46.9)	9.9 (49.8)	15.4 (59.7)	20.2 (68.4)	25.1 (77.2)	28.8 (83.8)	29.0 (84.2)	28.3 (82.9)	26.9 (80.4)	21.9 (71.4)	15.1 (59.2)	10.3 (50.5)	19.9 (67.9)
Record low °C (°F)	0.0 (32.0)	0.6 (33.1)	5.5 (41.9)	9.5 (49.1)	13.6 (56.5)	21.9 (71.4)	20.0 (68.0)	16.7 (62.1)	17.9 (64.2)	12.5 (54.5)	6.4 (43.5)	1.0 (33.8)	0.0 (32.0)
Average precipitation mm (inches)	4.0 (0.16)	1.3 (0.05)	0.8 (0.03)	1.1 (0.04)	0.5 (0.02)	0.6 (0.02)	2.2 (0.09)	9.9 (0.39)	17.4 (0.69)	9.2 (0.36)	3.4 (0.13)	0.0 (0.0)	50.4 (1.98)
Average precipitation days (≥ 1.0 mm)	0.2	0.2	0.3	0.1	0.1	0.4	1.3	2.4	1.2	0.3	0.2	0	6.7
Source: NOAA

== Transportation ==
Bordj Badji Mokhtar is very distant from other population centres, but the N6 national highway does connect it to Reggane and Adrar to the north and Timiaouine to the southeast. The smuggling of drugs, fuel and migrants is an important economic activity in the area, employing the In Khalil border crossing into Mali, about 20 kilometres (12 mi) southeast of the town.

Bordj Badji Mokhtar is served by Bordj Badji Mokhtar Airport.

== Education ==
1.2% of the population has a tertiary education, and another 4.4% has completed secondary education. The overall literacy rate is 26.1% (the lowest for any commune in Adrar Province), and is 33.3% among males (the lowest in the province) and 17.8% among females (the second lowest in the province). In the municipality there is only one school.
