= Timiaouine =

Timiaouine ﺗﻴﻤﻴﺎوﻳﻦ
- Town and commune
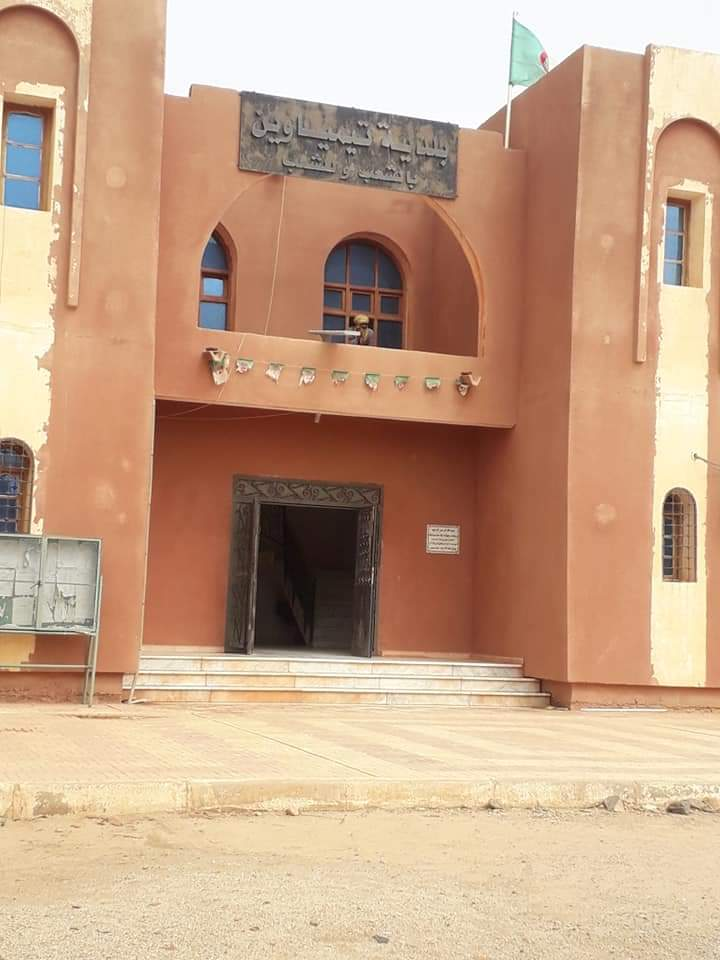
- Timiaouine town hall

- Location of Timiaouine commune within the former Adrar Province

- Location of Timiaouine within Algeria
- Coordinates: 20°26′14″N 1°48′38″E
- Country: Algeria
- Province: Bordj Badji Mokhtar
- District: Bordj Badji Mokhtar

Area
  - Total: 12,553 km^{2} (4,847 sq mi)
- Elevation: 582 m (1,909 ft)

Population (2008)
  - Total: 4,493
  - Density: 0.3579/km^{2} (0.9270/sq mi)
- Time zone: UTC+1 (CET)

Timiaouine (also called Timiaouine, Timéiaouine, Timéiawine) (Arabic: ﺗﻴﻤﻴﺎوﻳﻦ, Amazigh: ⵜⵉⵎⵢⴰⵡⵉⵏ) is a town and commune in Bordj Badji Mokhtar District, Bordj Baji Mokhtar Province, in southwest Algeria near the border with Mali. According to the 2008 census it has a population of 4,493, up from 4,206 in 1998, with an annual growth rate of 0.7%, the lowest rate in the province.

== History ==
In 1904, France sent two columns of troops to take the last major gap in central Sahara, the Adrar des Ifoghas. One departed from Tamanrasset, to the north, under the command of General Laperrine, the other from Timbuktu, to the south, under the command of Lieutenant Théveniaud. The two groups met on April 16, 1904 at the Timiaouine well.

== Toponym ==
In Amazigh, Timiaouine means "the gaps".

== Geography ==
Timiaouine lies at an elevation of 582 metres (1,909 ft) in the northern part of the Adrar des Ifoghas, a large massif in the Sahara Desert that extends further south to Kidal in Mali. The area is notable for large granite boulders that are found immediately to the west, and also further to the north, of the town.

=== Location ===
The territory of the municipality of Timiauine is located in the southeast of the province of Adrar, in the extreme south of Algeria.

Distances from other major cities:

- 130 km southeast of Bordj Badji Mokhtar
- 465 km southwest of Tamanrasset
- 850 km south-east of Adrar
- 1 820 km south of Algiers

== Localities ==
As of 1984, the commune was composed of one locality:

- Timiaouine

== Transportation ==
The only major road out of Timiaouine is the N6 national highway, which connects the city to Bordj Badji Mokhtar to the northwest and then Adrar to the north.

== Education ==
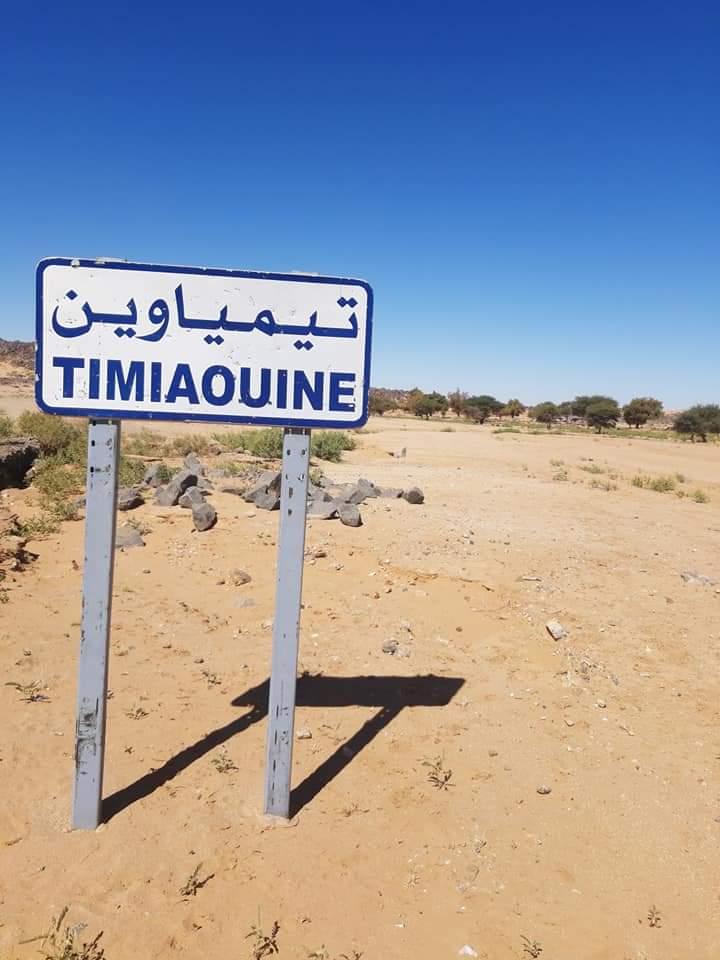
Sign at the entrance to Timiaouine

0.4% of the population has a tertiary education (the lowest rate for any commune in Bordj Baji Mokhtar Province), and another 2.3% has completed secondary education. The overall literacy rate is 63.5%, and is 70.9% among males and 56.0% among females.

== Health ==
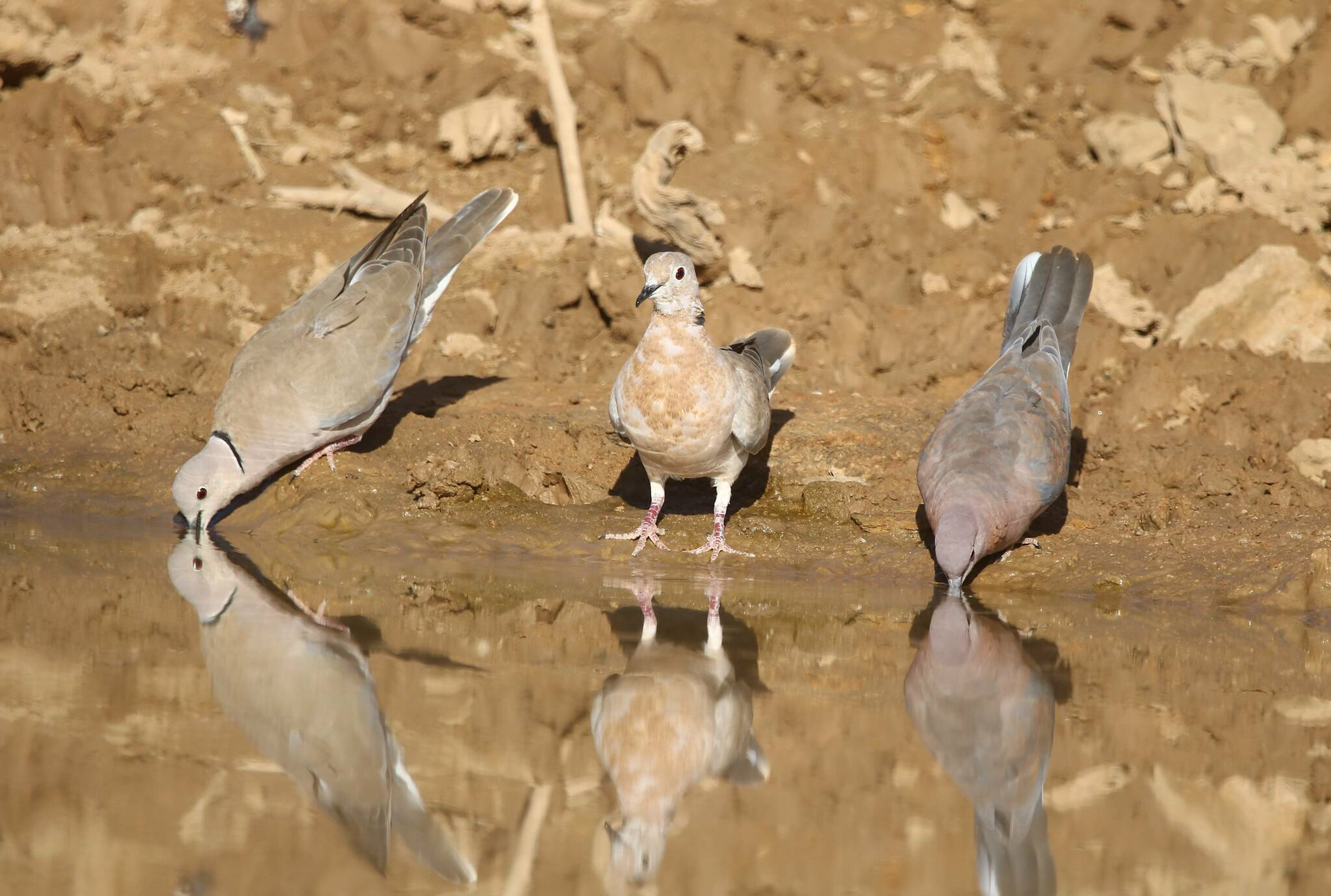
African collared doves in Timiaouine

In one of the hospitals in the province of Adrar, specialized consultations and hospitalizations are carried out for the inhabitants of the municipality.

They have the following hospitals:

- Ibn Sina Hospital in Adrar.
- Mohamed Hachemi Hospital in Timimoun .
- Reggane Hospital.
- Noureddine Sahraoui Hospital in Aoulef.
- Bordj Badji Mokhtar Hospital.
- Zaouiet Kounta Hospital.
- Tililane Hospital Center.
- 240-bed general hospital.
- 120-bed Geriatric Hospital.
- 120-bed psychiatric hospital.
- 120-bed cancer center.

== Climate ==
Timiaouine has a hot desert climate (Köppen climate classification BWh), with extremely hot summers and mild winters, and very little precipitation throughout the year.

Climate data for Timiaouine
Month	Jan	Feb	Mar	Apr	May	Jun	Jul	Aug	Sep	Oct	Nov	Dec	Year
Mean daily maximum °C (°F)	27.6 (81.7)	30.4 (86.7)	35.2 (95.4)	38.7 (101.7)	42.2 (108.0)	42.8 (109.0)	42.7 (108.9)	41.2 (106.2)	41.0 (105.8)	38.3 (100.9)	33.2 (91.8)	29.0 (84.2)	36.9 (98.4)
Mean daily minimum °C (°F)	14.4 (57.9)	16.2 (61.2)	20.4 (68.7)	24.6 (76.3)	27.8 (82.0)	29.8 (85.6)	29.2 (84.6)	28.1 (82.6)	28.1 (82.6)	25.5 (77.9)	19.5 (67.1)	15.6 (60.1)	23.3 (73.9)
Source: Storm247
