= Bordj Badji Mokhtar Province =

Province of Algeria

Bordj Badji Mokhtar Province ولاية برج باجي مختار
- Province
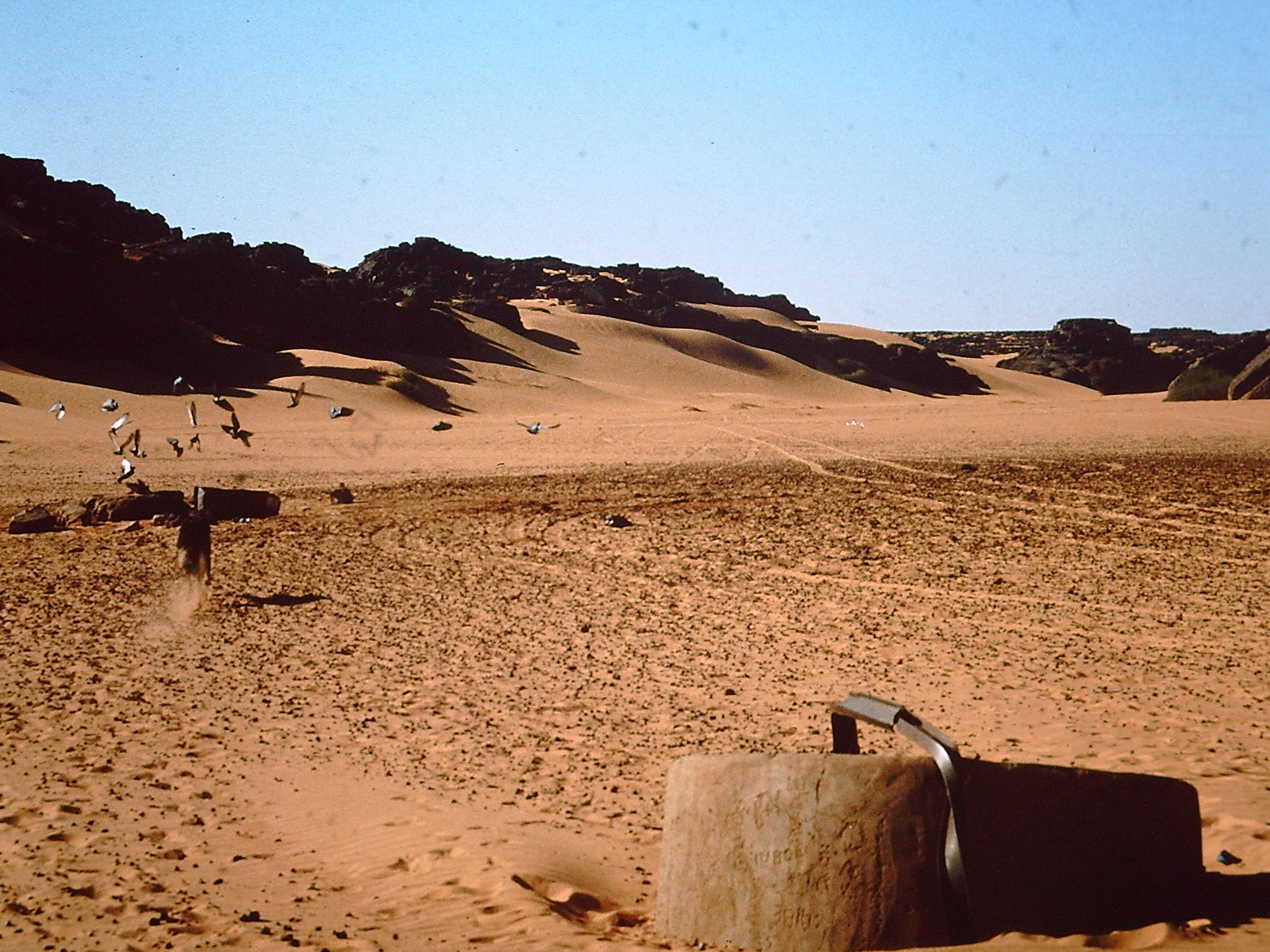
- A well in the province.

- Map of Algeria highlighting Bordj Badji Mokhtar
- Coordinates: 21°19′40″N 00°57′20″E
- Country: Algeria
- Established: December 18, 2019.
- Capital: Bordj Badji Mokhtar

Government
  - Wāli: Mahfoud Benflis

Area
  - Total: 120,026 km^{2} (46,342 sq mi)
- Elevation: 276 m (906 ft)

Population (2008)
  - Total: 16,437
  - Density: 0.13695/km^{2} (0.35469/sq mi)
- Time zone: UTC+01 (CET)
- Area code: +213 (0) 49
- ISO 3166 code: DZ-50
- Districts: 1
- Municipalities: 2

Bordj Badji Mokhtar (Arabic: ولاية برج باجي مختار) is an Algerian province (wilaya) in the Algerian Sahara. It was created in 2019 from the Adrar Province and had a population of 16,437 in 2008.

== Geography ==
The wilaya of Bordj Baji Mokhtar is in the Algerian Sahara; its area is 131,220 km².

It is delimited by:

- to the north by the Adrar Province;
- to the east by the In Guezzam and Tamanrasset Province;
- to the west by the Adrar Province, Mauritania and Mali;
- and to the south by Mali.

== History ==
The wilaya of Bordj Badji Mokhtar was created on November 26, 2019.

Previously, it was a delegated wilaya, created according to the law n° 15–140 of May 27, 2015, creating administrative districts in certain wilayas and fixing the specific rules related to them, as well as the list of municipalities that are attached to it. Before 2019, it was attached to the Adrar Province.

== Organization of the wilaya ==
During the administrative breakdown of 2015, the delegated wilaya of Bordj Baji Mokhtar is made up of 1 district and 2 communes.

=== List of walis ===
District	Commune	Map
Bordj Badji Mokhtar District	Bordj Badji Mokhtar	ﺑﺮج ﺑﺎﺟﻰ ﻣﺨﺘﺎر
Bordj Badji Mokhtar District	Timiaouine	ﺗﻴﻤﻴﺎوﻳﻦ
