= Algeria–Mali relations =

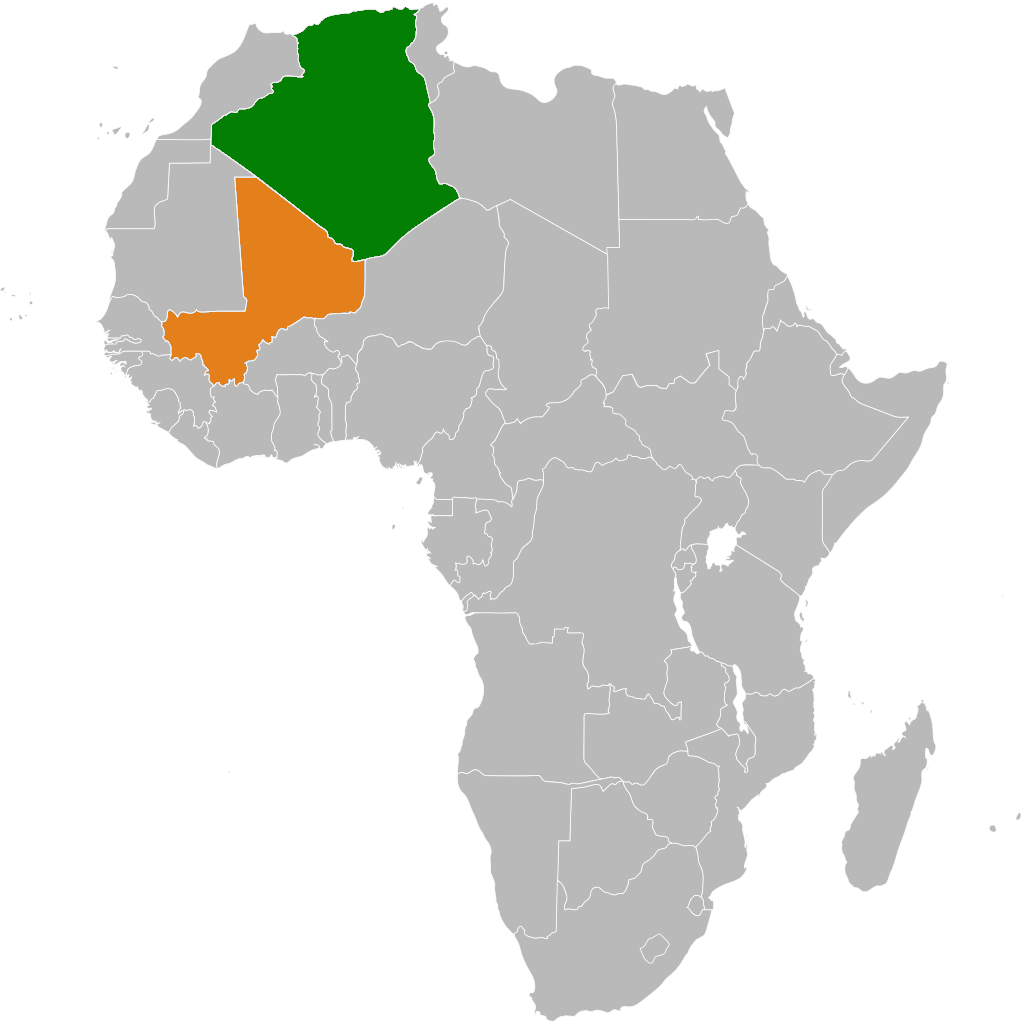
- Algeria: Mali

Algeria–Mali relations refers to bilateral relations between Algeria and Mali. Algeria maintains an embassy in Bamako and a consulate in Gao, while Mali has an embassy in Algiers.

== History ==
The relationship between Algeria and Mali, both former French colonies, has become a major obstacle for these neighboring states, as they share a long border that includes the Sahel desert. As predominantly Sunni Muslim countries, recent instability in Mali - notably in the Azawad region, home to the Tuareg people - has resulted in a significant al-Qaeda presence in the Islamic Maghreb, posing a challenge for Algeria. In response, Algeria has fortified its border and deployed more troops to secure the border with Mali. The growing threat of militants from Mali has led Algeria and the United States to discuss how to counter their extremist actions.

During the Tuareg rebellion of 2012, the Algerian consulate was seized by at least two people wearing explosives belts. Seven hostages were taken, including the consul. In regards to Azawad's UDI, Algeria's Prime Minister has declared it would never "accept questioning Mali's territorial integrity" Algeria has planned to co-ordinate with MNLA to work towards freeing the hostages.

Despite these challenges, Algeria and Mali have been working to diversify their economic cooperation. Algeria has emerged as a major investor in Mali, due in part to its relatively lower poverty rate and greater economic progress.

In December 2023, Mali recalled its ambassador to Algeria after accusing him of interfering in its internal affairs by meeting with rebel leaders, thus intensifying diplomatic tensions over efforts to end separatist and Islamist insurgencies in northern Mali.

On March 31, 2025, around midnight, a Malian reconnaissance drone of the Akinci type that had penetrated 2 kilometers into Algerian airspace near the border town of Tin Zaouatine was detected and shot down, the Algerian Ministry of National Defense (MDN) said without giving further details. These incidents have heightened tensions between the two countries, which were already in a diplomatic conflict. In April 2025, Algeria withdrew its ambassador to Mali. On April 7, Algeria banned flights to and from Mali in response to "recurring violations" of Algerian airspace by Malian military drones. On July 10 2026, both countries returned their ambassador and reopened airspace to for flight of the other's airline.

== Migration ==
Malian immigrants form at least 1% of the Algerian population, with most of them living in coastal cities such as Oran, Constantine, Algiers, Tamanrasset and Adrar Provinces.
