= Tin Zaouatine =

Tin Zaouatine تين زاوتين
- Town and commune
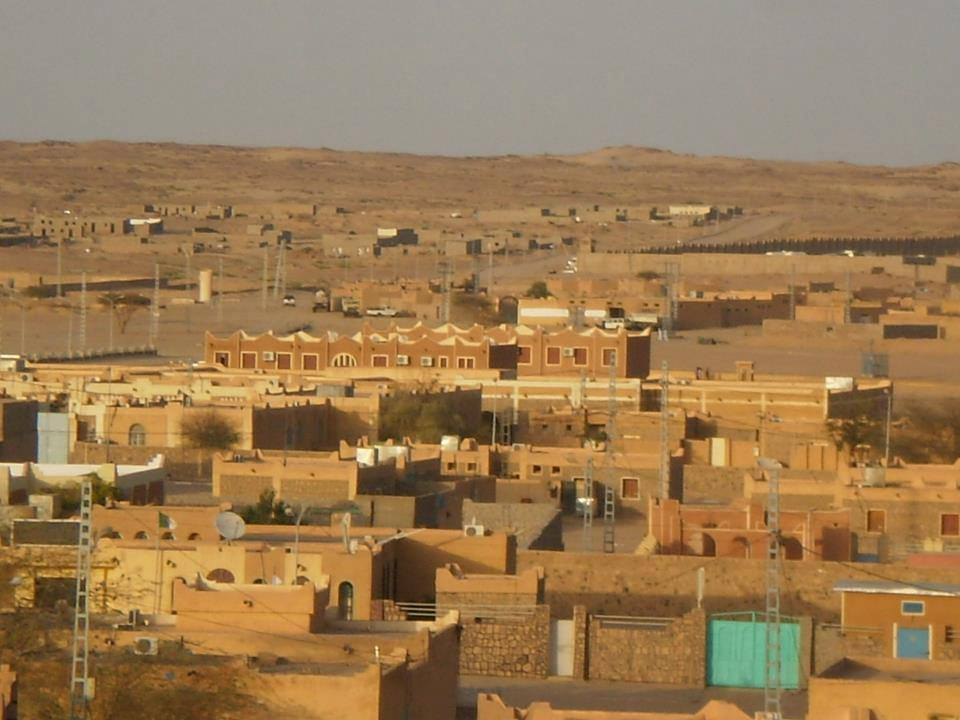
- Tin Zaouatine in 2013

- Location of Tin Zaouatine commune in Guezzam Province

- Location of Tin Zaouatine within Algeria
- Coordinates: 19°57′12″N 2°58′0″E
- Country: Algeria
- Province: In Guezzam
- District: Tin Zaouatine (coextensive)

Government
  - PMA Seats: 7

Area
  - Total: 41,313 km^{2} (15,951 sq mi)
- Elevation: 630 m (2,070 ft)

Population (2008)
  - Total: 4,157
  - Density: 0.1006/km^{2} (0.2606/sq mi)
- Time zone: UTC+01 (CET)
- Postal code: 11150
- ONS code: 1107

Tin Zaouatine (Arabic: تين زاوتين) (also spelled Tinzouatine, Tin Zaoutine, Ti-n-Zaouatene or Tin Zaouaten) is a commune, coextensive with the district of Tin Zaouatine, in In Guezzam Province, Algeria, near the border of Mali. According to the 2008 census it has a population of 4,157, up from 2,314 in 1998, with an annual growth rate of 6.2%, the highest rate in the province. Its postal code is 11150 and its municipal code is 1107.

== History ==
The commune was created in 1984.

Following the outbreak of the war in Mali, it was reported that there was an exodus of inhabitants seeking safety from the Malian town of Tinzaouaten towards the Algerian side. Between 2013 and 2016, Tin Zaouatine's population increased from 9,000 to more than 20,000 people. By 2020, only a few families were still living in Tinzaouaten, which was controlled by armed units from the Coordination of Azawad Movements. It became a popular transit point for refugees, who mostly crossed the border at midday, because of an increased security patrol at night.

In May 2020, Algerian authorities erected a fence separating Tin Zaouatine from Tinzaouaten. On June 15, 2020, clashes between police and locals protesting over the decision left one man, Ayoub Ag Adji, dead and several others injured. Although the fence was eventually removed, police continue to patrol the areas extensively.

== Geography ==
Tin Zaouatine lies at an elevation of 630 metres (2,070 ft) in the far north-western part of the Adrar des Ifoghas mountain range, which lies mostly in Mali. A series of long, rocky ridges run from north-south to the west of the town.

== Climate ==
Tin Zaouatine has a hot desert climate (Köppen climate classification BWh), with long, extremely hot summers and short, very warm winters. Despite an extremely dry climate, some occasional rainfall occur during the months of August and September due to the influence of the far northern edge of the West African Monsoon, unlike most of the Algerian Desert. Despite the high elevation, Average daytime high temperatures during the summer regularly reach 40 °C (104 °F) and can go above 45 °C (113 °F).

== Education ==
1.9% of the population has a tertiary education, and another 3.6% has completed secondary education. The overall literacy rate is 47.2%, and is 58.1% among males and 35.3% among females; all three figures are the second lowest in the province (after In Guezzam).

== Localities ==
The commune is composed of four localities:

- Tinzaouatene
- Hassi In Tafouk (eastern part)
- Oued Tassamak (western part)
- Taouandart

== Administration and infrastructure ==
The current mayor of Tin Zaoutine is Mohamed Mansouri (2020), a native of the city, who was in his fourth term in 2016. The municipality is judicially dependent on the In Guezzam court. A gendarmerie brigade is established there, as well as a local health center. Each year, 60 to 70 young high school graduates graduate from Tin Zaouatine high schools. No road connects the locality to its capital Tamanrasset.
