= Bordj Badji Mokhtar District =

Bordj Badji Mokhtar District دائرة برج باجي مختار
- District
- Coordinates: 21°20′N 0°57′E
- Country: Algeria
- Province: Bordj Baji Mokhtar Province
- Capital: Bordj Badji Mokhtar

Population (2008)
  - Total: 20,930
- Time zone: UTC+1 (CET)

Bordj Badji Mokhtar District is a district of Bordj Baji Mokhtar Province, Algeria. According to the 2008 census, it has a population of 20,930.

== Communes ==
The district is further divided into two communes:

- Bordj Badji Mokhtar
- Timiaouine
