= University of Constantine 3 =

Coordinates: 36.278°N 6.588°E

- جامعة قسنطينة 3 - صالح بوبنيدر (Arabic); Université Constantine 3 - Salah Boubnider (French)
- Type: Public
- Established: November 28, 2011
- Affiliations: University Agency of the Francophonie
- Location: Nouvelle ville Ali Mendjeli BP 72b, Constantine, Algeria
- Website: www.univ-constantine3.dz

The University of Constantine 3, (Arabic: جامعة قسنطينة 3) ,also known as University of Salah Boubnider, is a public university located in Constantine, Algeria established in November 2011.

The university was established in accordance with Executive Decree No. 11-402 dated 28 November 2011, It is the same date on which the University of Constantine 2 was founded.

== Faculties and institutes ==
- Faculty of Medicine
- Faculty of Architecture and Urban Planning
- Faculty of Civil Engineering
- Faculty of Media, Communication, and Audiovisual Studies
- Faculty of Political Sciences
- Faculty of Arts and Culture
- Institute of Urban Technology Management

== See also ==
- List of universities in Algeria
- University of Constantine 1
- University of Constantine 2

== University rankings links ==
- University of Constantine 3 on THE Rankings
- University of Constantine 3 on Uniranks
- University of Constantine 3 on SCImago Institutions Rankings
