= Zoubida Assoul =

Algerian lawyer and politician

- زبيدة عسول
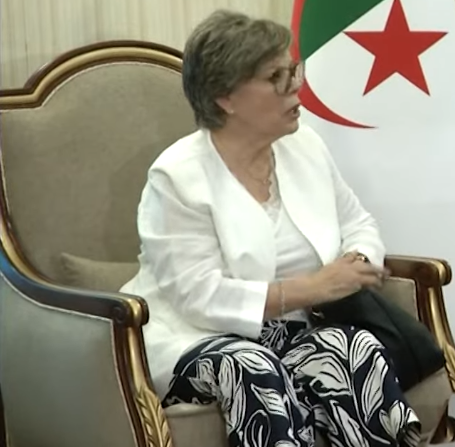
- Assoul in 2024

Personal details
- Born: 15 May 1956 (age 70) Tébessa, Bône, French Algeria
- Party: Union for Change and Progress
- Education: Constantine 1 University

Zoubida Assoul (Arabic: زبيدة عسول, Berber languages: ⵣⴱⵉⴷⴰ ⵄⵙⵓⵍ ; born 15 May 1956) is an Algerian lawyer and politician. She is the current president/head of the Union for Change and Progress party. Assoul is known for her role in advocating for democratic reforms and human rights in Algeria. In 2024, she announced her candidacy for the 2024 Algerian presidential elections.

== Early life ==
Assoul was born in Tébessa in 1956. Her father, Assoul Tebessi, was a religious scholar.

== Education and career ==
In 1976, Assoul completed her high school education, earning a baccalaureate in the literature stream in Khenchela. She decided to pursue a career in law and enrolled at the University of Constantine.

In 1980, she graduated from the university with a degree in private law. Following her graduation, she successfully passed the competitive examination for the magistracy.

=== Law career ===
In 1982, Assoul found a job as a family judge. There, she witnessed many cases relevant to the issue of women's rights in Algeria.

In 1987, Zoubida Assoul became the first woman appointed as a senior manager at the Ministry of Justice. She later served as an inspector until 1993 and then became head of studies at the general secretariat of the government in 1994.

=== Politics ===
From 1992 to 1994, she was a member of the National Consultative Council (an advisory body) and later from 1994 to 1997 the National Transitional Council, the transitional legislature following the 1992 Algerian coup d'état. In 2000, she became an advisor to the President of the Council of the Nation. She was also involved in the 2019 Hirak, a series of demonstrations against the political climate.

As of 2024, she announced her candidacy for the 2024 Algerian presidential elections.
