= University of Constantine 1 =

University in Constantine, Algeria

Coordinates: 36°20′58″N 6°37′18″E

- جامعة قسنطينة 1 (Arabic); Université Constantine 1 (French)
- Former names: Mentouri Brothers University
- Type: Public University
- Established: 1969
- Affiliations: UNIMED - University Agency of the Francophonie - Association of Arab Universities
- Students: 63,000
- Location: P.O. Box 325 Route de Aïn-El-Bey, Constantine, 25017, Algeria
- Campus: Urban
- Colors
- Website: University website

The University of Constantine 1 (in Arabic: جامعة قسنطينة 1), formerly known as Mentouri Brothers University, is a public university located in Constantine, Algeria. Designed by Brazilian architect Oscar Niemeyer, the university was established in 1969.

== Location ==
The University is located in the city of Constantine, on the road connecting Mohamed Boudiaf Airport to the city center. With an area of 544,660 m², spread over 13 campuses, 6 faculties, and 38 departments, it offers more than 98 specializations.

== History ==
The University of Mentouri Constantine was established by Decree No. 69-54 issued on June 17, 1969, during the reign of the late President Houari Boumediene. This is an important date for the university, as it gained its independence after having been a university center affiliated with the University of Algiers, whose mission was limited to teaching a limited number of disciplines such as literature and law.

The project of the university was commissioned by President Houari Boumedienne, who remained in power from 1965 to 1978, and coordinated by the Minister of Higher Education and Scientific Research Seddik Benyahia (1971-1977).

== University buildings ==
The university was designed according to the plans of Brazilian architect Oscar Niemeyer (who was in contact with the Ecotec design office headed by Mr. Mehnaoui Abdelhamid) and built by the Ecotec company. The university consists of more than 6 buildings:

- The Literature Building (in French: Bloc des lettres)
- The Sciences Building (in French: Bloc des sciences)
- Faculty of Law Building (Tidjani Hadam) (in French: Bloc des droits (Tidjani Hadam)
- The Central Library (in French: Bibliothèque centrale)
- Auditorium
- Rectorate
- The Restaurant (in French: Grand Resto)
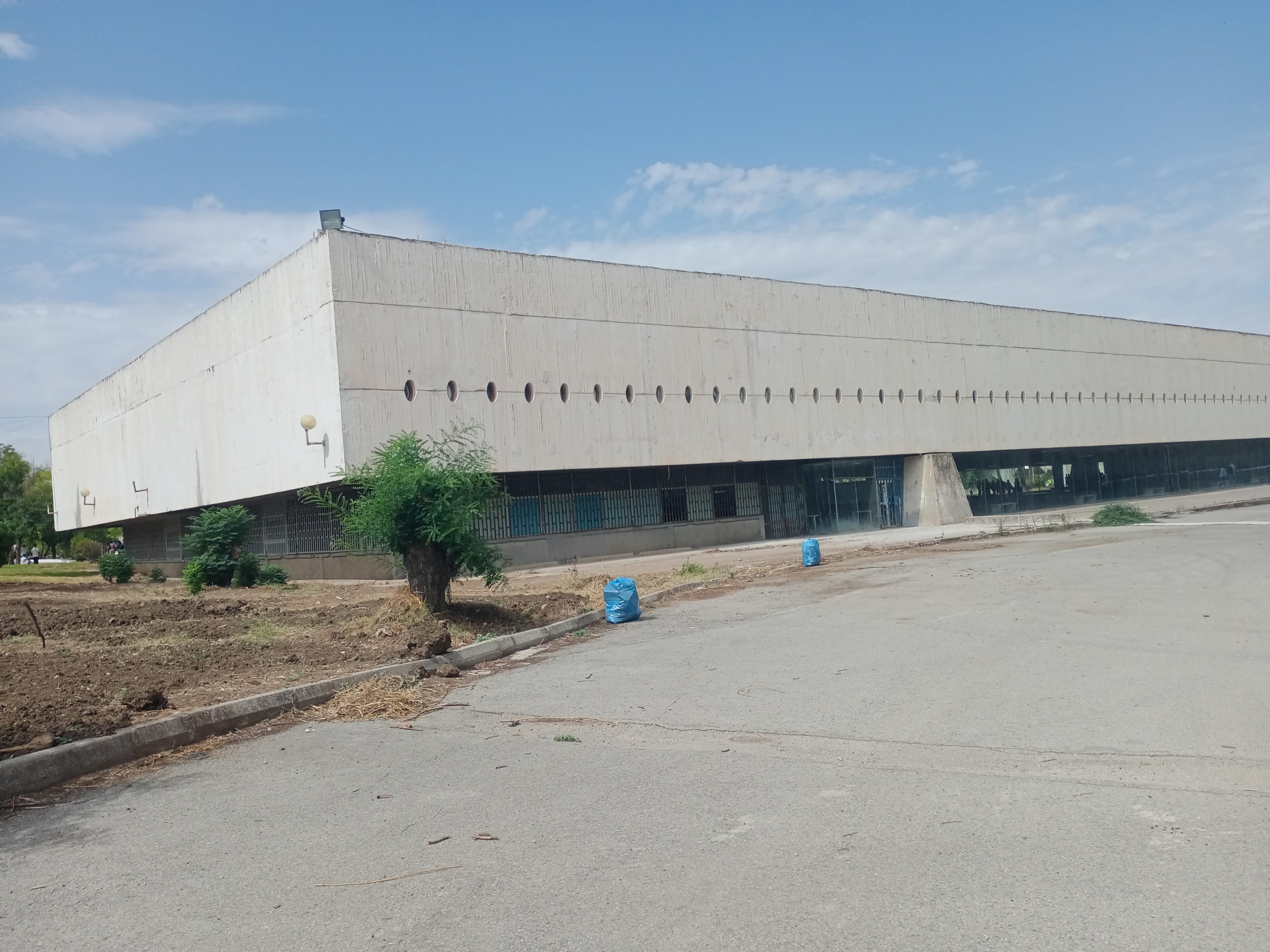
The Literature Building

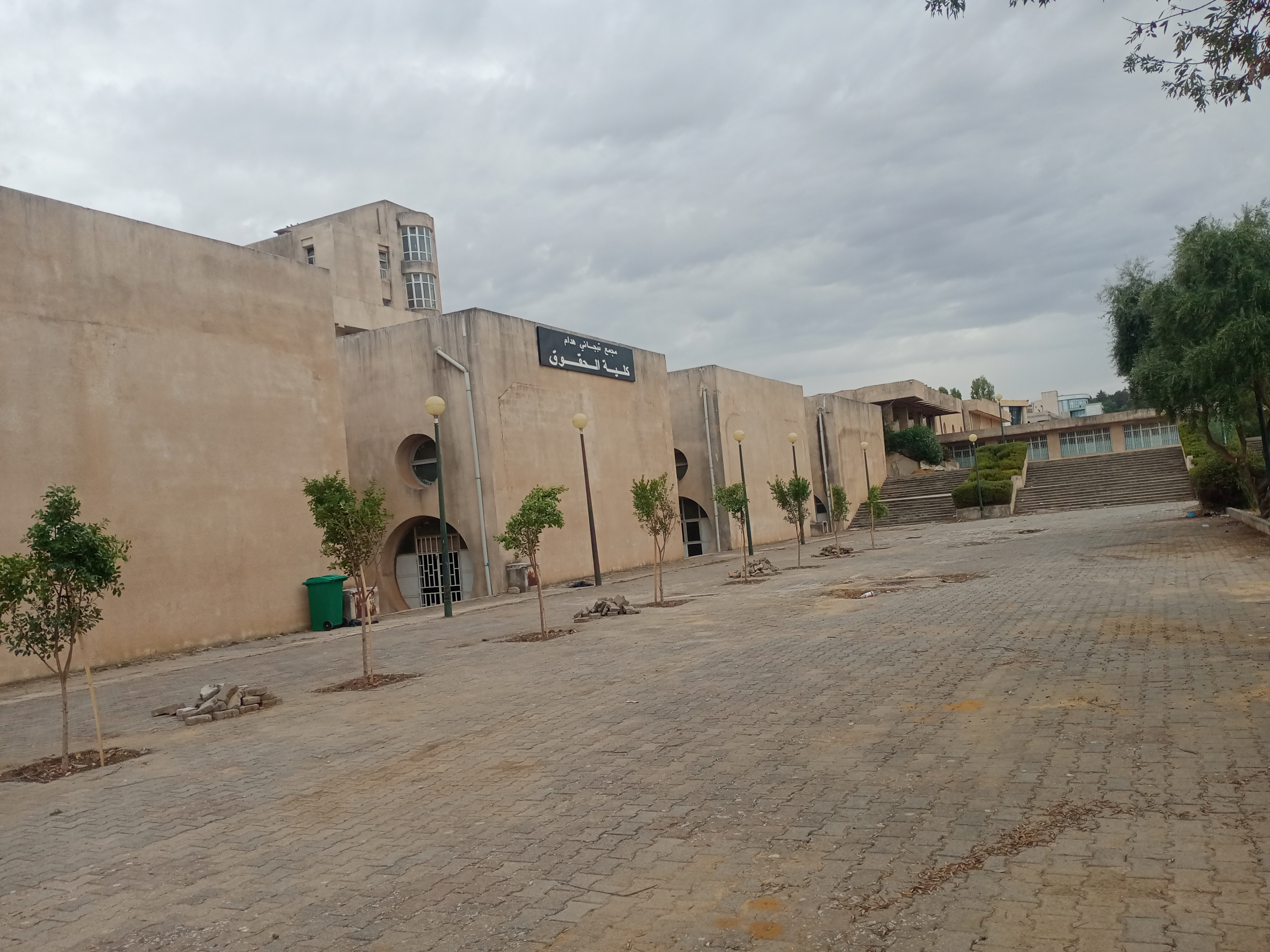
Faculty of Law (Tidjani Hadam)

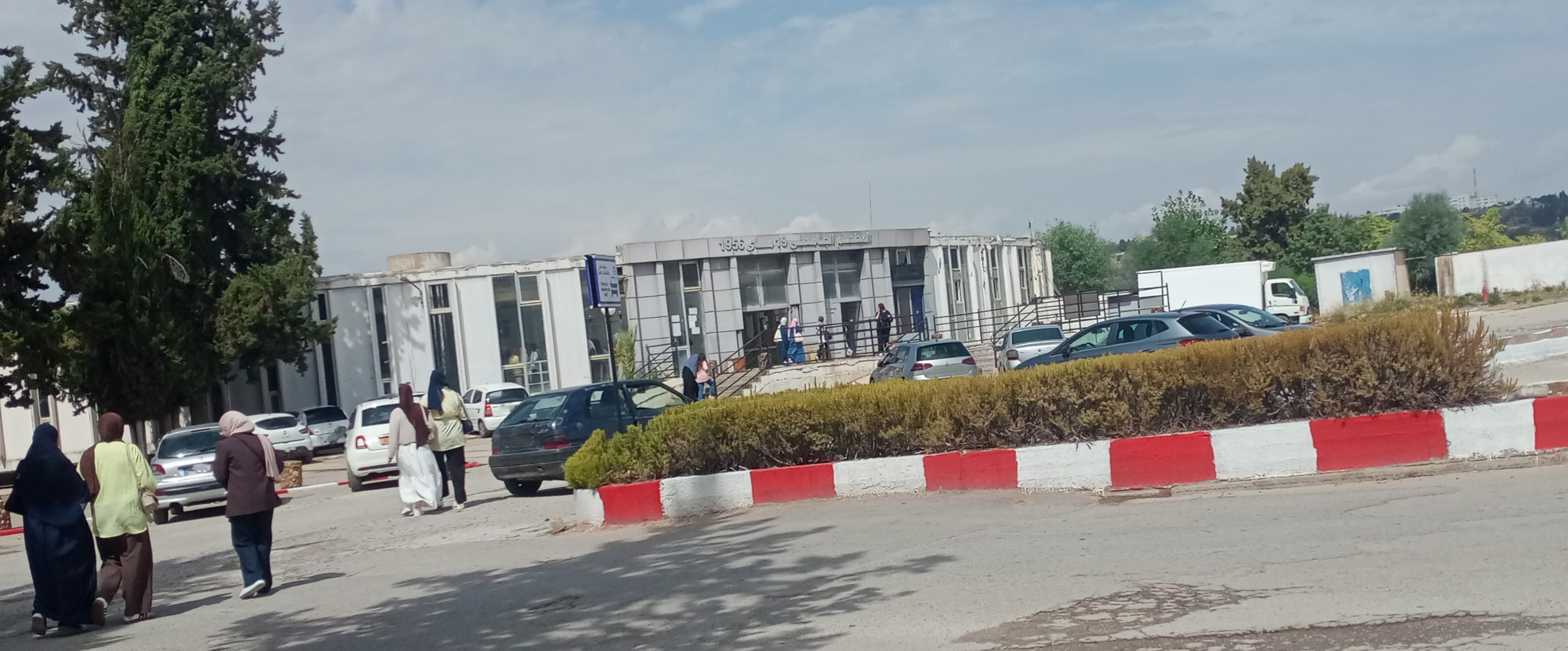
The Restaurant

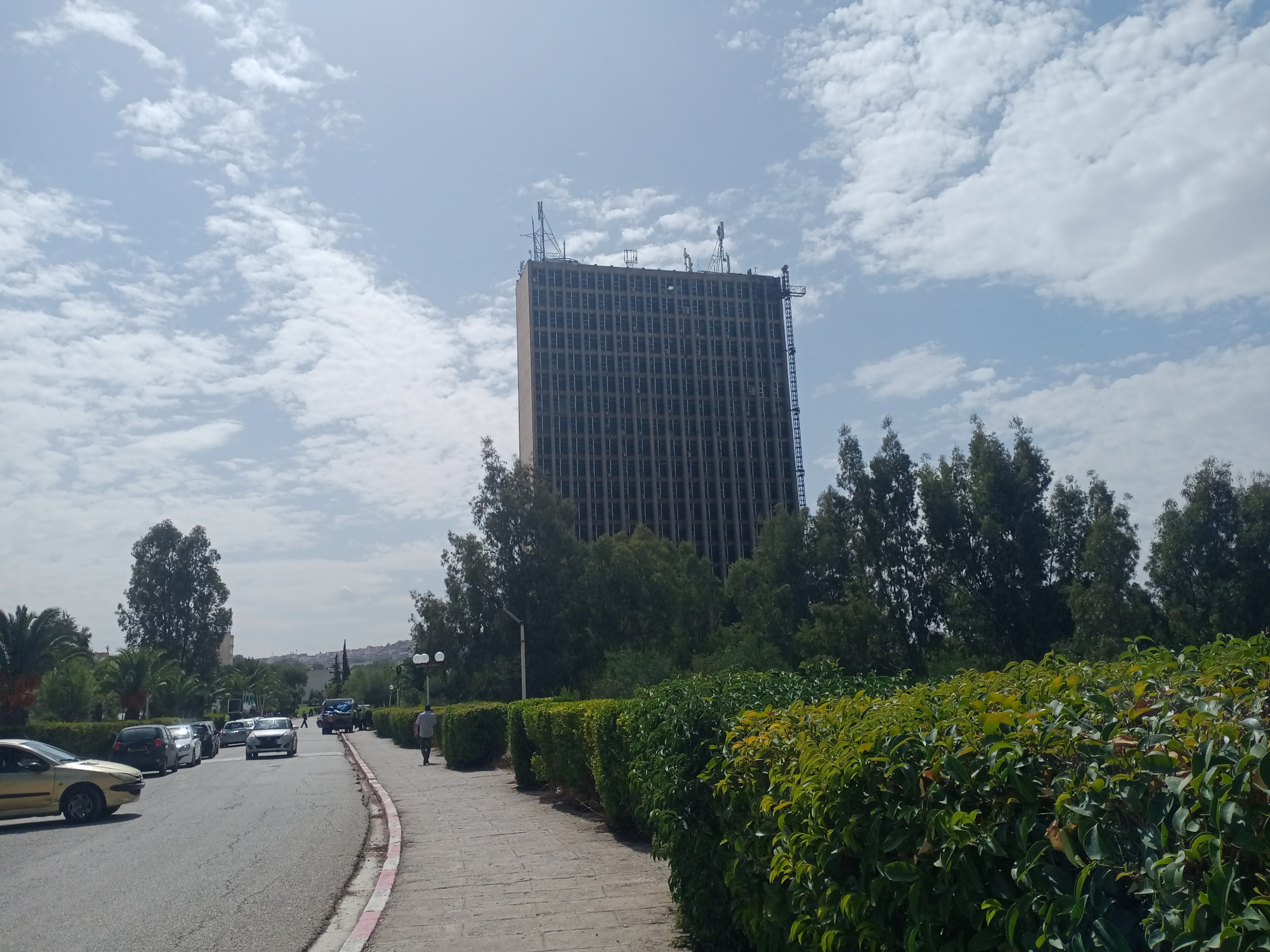
Rectorate

== Faculties and Institutes ==
- Faculty of Science and Technology
- Faculty of Arts and Languages
- Faculty of Natural and Life Sciences
- Faculty of Law
- Faculty of Exact Sciences
- Faculty of Earth Sciences
- Institute of Nutrition, Food, and Agri-Food Technologies
- Institute of Veterinary Sciences
- Institute of Applied Sciences and Technologies.

== Notable graduates ==
- Habib Tengour (Writer, poet, and sociologist)
- Fadhila El Farouk (Writer)
- Anouar Benmalek (Writer and journalist)
- Bouguerra Soltani (Politician)
- Zoubida Assoul (Lawyer and politician)
- Meriem Merdaci (Minister of Culture and Arts of Algeria, March 31 - August 24, 2019)
- Mouni Bouallam (actress)
- Mohamed El-Amine Belghit (Historian)
- Kaoutar Krikou

== See also ==
- List of universities in Algeria
- University of Constantine 2
- University of Constantine 3

== University Rankings links ==
- University of Constantine 1 on THE Rankings
- University of Constantine 1 on Uniranks
- University of Constantine 1 on QS World University Rankings
- University of Constantine 1 on SCImago Institutions Rankings
