= In Guezzam Province =

Province of Algeria

In Guezzam Province ولاية عين قزّام
- Province
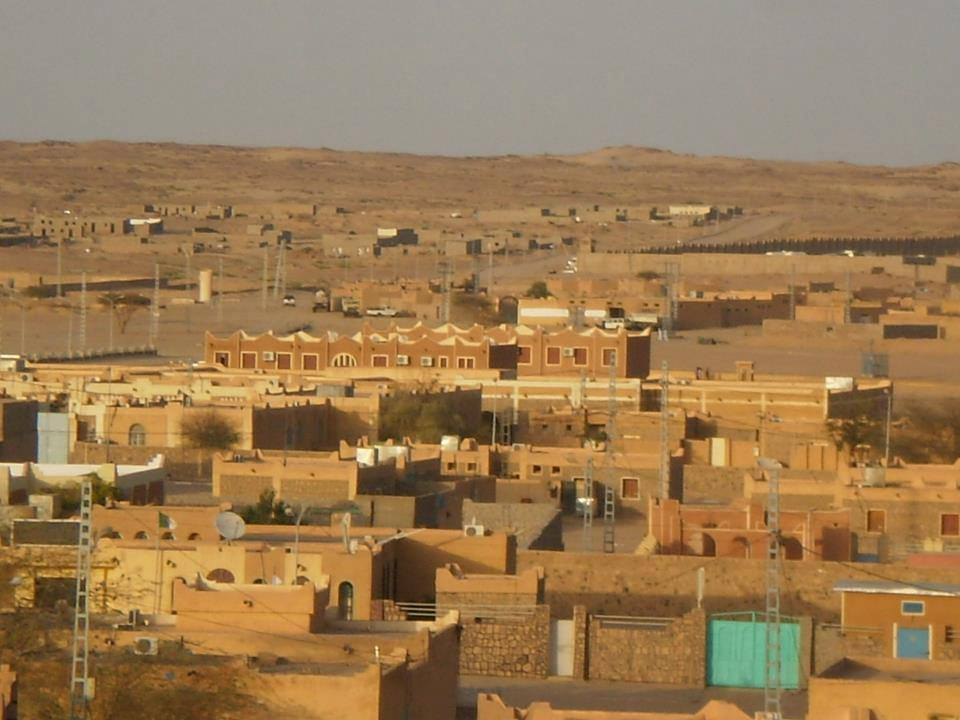
- Tin Zaouatine, one of the two communes in the province

- Coordinates: 19°34′20″N 5°46′10″E
- Country: Algeria
- Established: December 18, 2019
- Capital: In Guezzam

Area
  - Total: 88,126 km^{2} (34,026 sq mi)
- Elevation: 276 m (906 ft)

Population (2008)
  - Total: 11,202
  - Density: 0.12711/km^{2} (0.32922/sq mi)

In Guezzam Province (Arabic: ولاية عين قزّام) is a province (wilaya) in far southern Algeria that was created in 2019. It is the southernmost and least populous province of Algeria and lies on the border with Niger. It had a population of 11,202 in the present boundaries during the 2008 census.

== History ==
Prior to its creation in 2019, In Guezzam Province was part of Tamanrasset Province. Tamanrasset Province was created from Oasis Province in 1974.

The province was approved on May 27, 2015 and was confirmed on November 26, 2019. The following month, on December 18, 2019, In Guezzam Province was created after the Cabinet of Algeria passed a bill that created 10 new provinces in a rare move. Prior to that there was no creation of provinces in Algeria for 35 years.

The capital of the province is also called In Guezzam as all Algerian provinces are required to be named after their capitals.

== Administrative divisions ==
The province consists of 2 daïra of which both are coextensive with the 2 communes which are In Guezzam with a population 7,045 in 2008, and Tin Zaouatine with a population of 4,157 in 2008. The boundaries of the province are exactly the same as the old In Guezzam District that was part of Tamanrasset Province.

District	Commune	Arabic
In Guezzam District	In Guezzam	عين قزام
Tin Zaouatine District	Tin Zaouatine	تين زاوتين
