= In Guezzam =

In Guezzam إن قزام / Gezzam
- Town and commune
- Main street before the border with Niger, 1985.

- Location of In Guezzam commune within In Guezzam Province

- Location of In Guezzam within Algeria
- Coordinates: 19°34′7″N 5°46′20″E
- Country: Algeria
- Province: In Guezzam
- District: In Guezzam (coextensive)

Government
  - PMA Seats: 7

Area
  - Total: 46,813 km^{2} (18,075 sq mi)
- Elevation: 400 m (1,300 ft)

Population (2008)
  - Total: 7,045
  - Density: 0.1505/km^{2} (0.3898/sq mi)
- Time zone: UTC+01 (CET)
- Postal code: 11130
- ONS code: 1104

In Guezzam (Arabic: إن قزام, lit. lizard springs in Berber) is a town and commune that is the capital of In Guezzam Province, Algeria, on the border with Niger. Until 26 November 2019, it was a part of the Tamanrasset Province. The border town on the Niger side is Assamaka. According to the 2008 census it had a population of 7,045, up from 4,938 in 1998, with an annual growth rate of 3.7%, the second highest in the Tamanrasset province's 2008 boundaries.

== History ==
The commune of In Guezzam was established on 19 December 1984. The district was established in 1986. On 18 December 2019 it became a provincial capital of the new In Guezzam Province.

Population history

In Guezzam's population growth since 1977:
Year	Population	Source
1977	1 195	
1987	2 189	
1998	4 938	
2008 (census)	7,045	

== Geography ==
In Guezzam lies in the barren Tanezrouft region of far southern Algeria. The landscape is sandy, with frequent sand dunes interspersed with sandstone outcrops. As the town is located in the southern extremity of the nation, the Gulf of Guinea is closer to it than the Mediterranean coast in the north. The distance from In Guezzam to 11 African capital cities is shorter as the crow flies than the distance to Algiers.

== Climate ==
In Guezzam has a hot desert climate (Köppen climate classification BWh), with long, extremely hot summers and short, very warm winters. Despite an extremely dry climate, some occasional rainfall occurs during the months of August and September due to the influence of the far northern edge of the West African Monsoon, unlike most of the Algerian Desert. Averages high temperatures soar during the height of the long summer season, with daytime highs always over 40 °C (104 °F) during nearly 4 months and even above 45 °C (113 °F).

Climate data for In Guezzam
Month	Jan	Feb	Mar	Apr	May	Jun	Jul	Aug	Sep	Oct	Nov	Dec	Year
Mean daily maximum °C (°F)	26.5 (79.7)	29.3 (84.7)	33.7 (92.7)	38.3 (100.9)	41.0 (105.8)	41.6 (106.9)	40.1 (104.2)	39.0 (102.2)	38.9 (102.0)	37.0 (98.6)	32.6 (90.7)	28.4 (83.1)	35.5 (96.0)
Daily mean °C (°F)	18.6 (65.5)	21.1 (70.0)	25.3 (77.5)	30.1 (86.2)	33.3 (91.9)	34.6 (94.3)	33.3 (91.9)	32.4 (90.3)	31.8 (89.2)	29.3 (84.7)	24.6 (76.3)	20.6 (69.1)	27.9 (82.2)
Mean daily minimum °C (°F)	10.7 (51.3)	13.0 (55.4)	17.0 (62.6)	22.0 (71.6)	25.6 (78.1)	27.6 (81.7)	26.5 (79.7)	25.9 (78.6)	24.8 (76.6)	21.6 (70.9)	16.6 (61.9)	12.8 (55.0)	20.3 (68.6)
Average rainfall mm (inches)	0 (0)	0 (0)	0 (0)	0 (0)	1 (0.0)	3 (0.1)	7 (0.3)	23 (0.9)	9 (0.4)	0 (0)	0 (0)	0 (0)	43 (1.7)
Source: Climate-data.org

== Transportation ==
In Guezzam lies on the Trans-Sahara Highway, at the end of the N1 Algerian national highway, which leads north to Tamanrasset and eventually Algiers. The road continues southeast to Arlit in Niger. In Guezzam is also served by In Guezzam Airport, which is, however, closed for public usage.

== Education ==
1.7% of the population has a tertiary education (the equal lowest rate in the province), and another 4.9% has completed secondary education. The overall literacy rate is 39.4%, and is 50.7% among males and 29.1% among females; all three rates are the lowest in the province.

== Localities ==
The commune is composed of six localities:

- In Guezzam
- In Azaoua
- Laouni
- In Ataye
- Garet Nous
- Hassi in Tafouk
