= University of Constantine 2 =

University in Constantine, Algeria

- جامعة قسنطينة 2 - عبد الحميد مهري (Arabic); Université Constantine 2 - Abdelhamid Mehri (French)
- Type: Public
- Established: November 28, 2011
- Location: Nouvelle ville Ali Mendjeli BP : 67A, Constantine, Algeria; 36.246°N 6.570°E
- Colors
- Website: www.univ-constantine2.dz

The University of Constantine 2, (Arabic: جامعة قسنطينة 2) ,also known as University of Abdelhamid Mehri, is a public university, located in Constantine, Algeria, established in November 2011.

The university was established in accordance with Executive Decree No. 11-401 dated November 28, 2011, It is the same date on which the University of Constantine 3 was founded.

== Faculties and Institutes ==
- Faculty of Humanities and Social Sciences
- Faculty of Psychology and Education Sciences
- Faculty of Modern Information and Communication Technologies
- Faculty of Economics, Business and Management Sciences
- Institute of Library Sciences
- Institute of Physical and Sports Sciences and Technologies

== See also ==
- List of universities in Algeria
- Abdelhamid Mehri
- University of Constantine 3
- University of Constantine 1

== University Rankings links ==
- University of Constantine 2 on THE Rankings
- University of Constantine 2 on Uniranks
- University of Constantine 2 on QS World University Rankings
- University of Constantine 2 on SCImago Institutions Rankings
