= History of rail transport in Algeria =

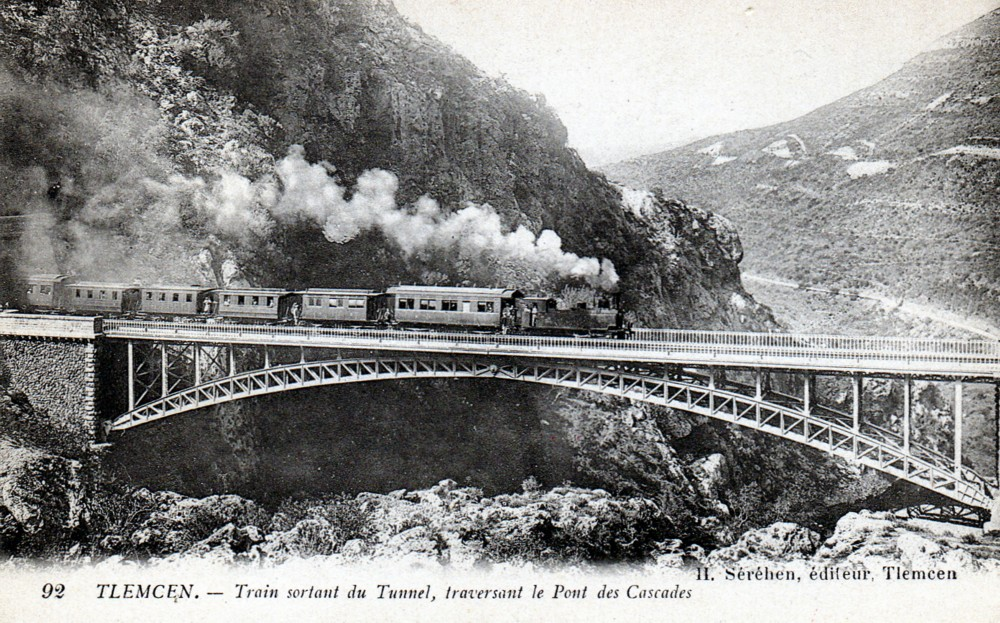
A train crossing the Cascades Bridge in Tlemcen, 1905.

The history of rail transport in Algeria began in 1857 during the French colonization with the implementation of an initial plan for the creation of a 1,357 kilometres (843 mi) railway network. This plan, formalized by a decree from Emperor Napoleon III, defined the initial framework of the Algerian railway network, which continued to evolve throughout the second half of the 19th century, both in terms of its scale and structure.

The initial railway network revolved around a main railway artery connecting the capital cities of the three departments of the country: Algiers, Constantine, and Oran. Branching out from these main lines were secondary lines that extended towards the major ports of the colony. These early railway lines primarily served the transportation of agricultural products and raw materials from Algeria to mainland France, as well as the movement of manufactured goods from coastal cities to the interior regions of the colony.

The Algerian railway network was constructed in a fragmented manner across different regions due to the presence of multiple concessionary companies and the lack of overall coordination. It was not until the early 20th century that the French government and the Algerian government unified the various components of the network and simplified its management by reducing the number of companies involved.

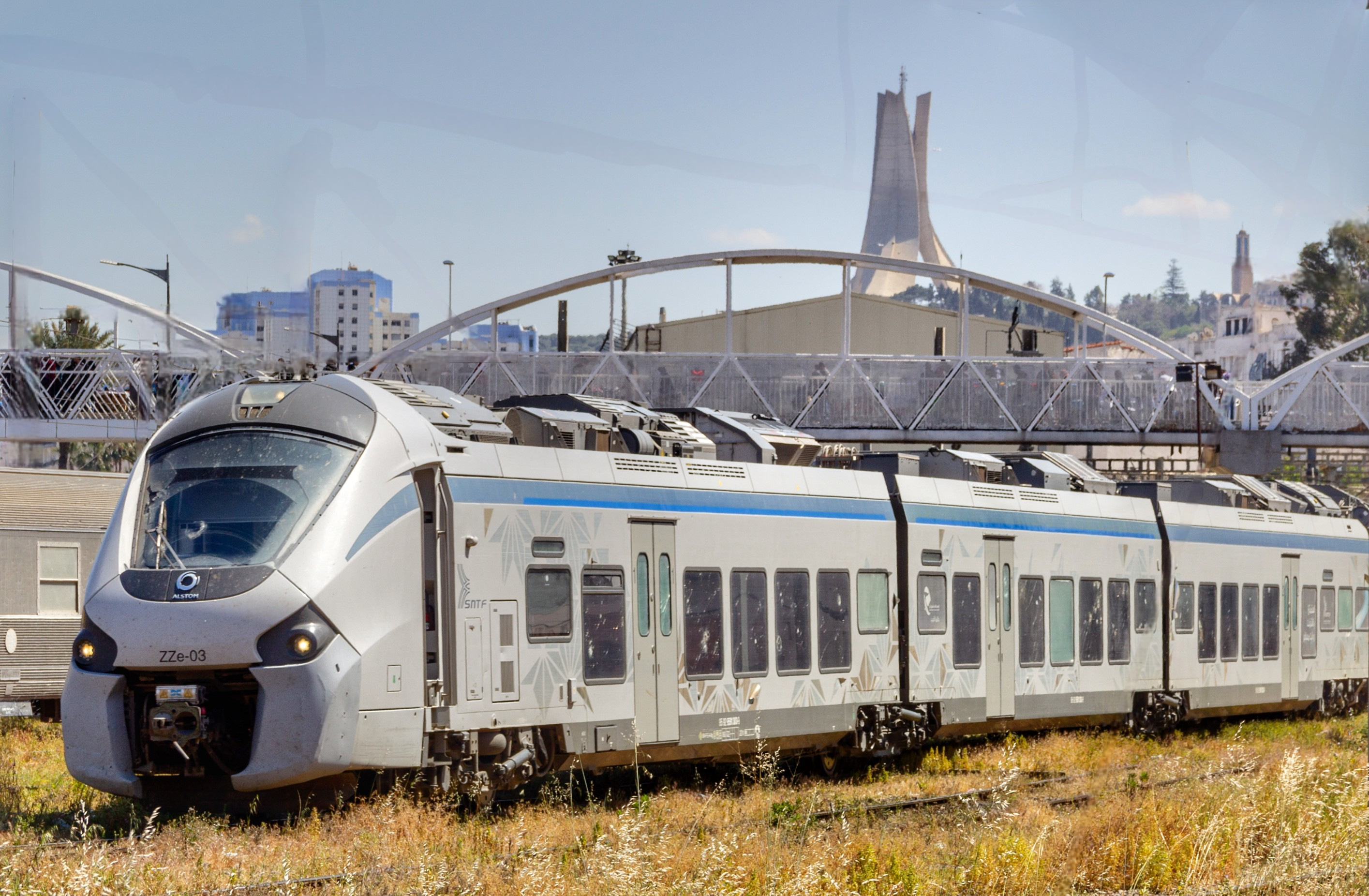
A Coradia ZZe train, with the Martyr's Memorial in the background.

The railway network underwent significant evolution throughout the first half of the 20th century. At its peak, just before the outbreak of the Second World War, it encompassed up to 5,000 kilometres (3,100 mi) of railway lines. However, following the war, railway transport in Algeria faced competition from road transport, and several secondary lines were closed in the decades leading up to the country's independence.

In 1962, the newly established Algerian state initially focused on managing the existing railway network, ensuring efficient operation and maintenance. It was not until the early 2000s that a major plan for modernization and expansion of the network was implemented. This involved the creation of new railway lines, the doubling or electrification of existing ones, and a gradual extension of the network to cover the entire country.

Significant developments included the construction of a railway ring road in the High Plateaus and the ongoing completion of feeder lines connecting major cities in the northern Sahara region. Moreover, studies are currently being conducted to extend these lines through the Sahara, connecting the Algerian railway network with neighbouring countries to the south. This expansion aims to facilitate the transportation of various goods, such as minerals and petrochemical products, by rail between Sahelian countries, Algerian ports, Europe, and other global destinations.

== Period of Colonial Algeria ==
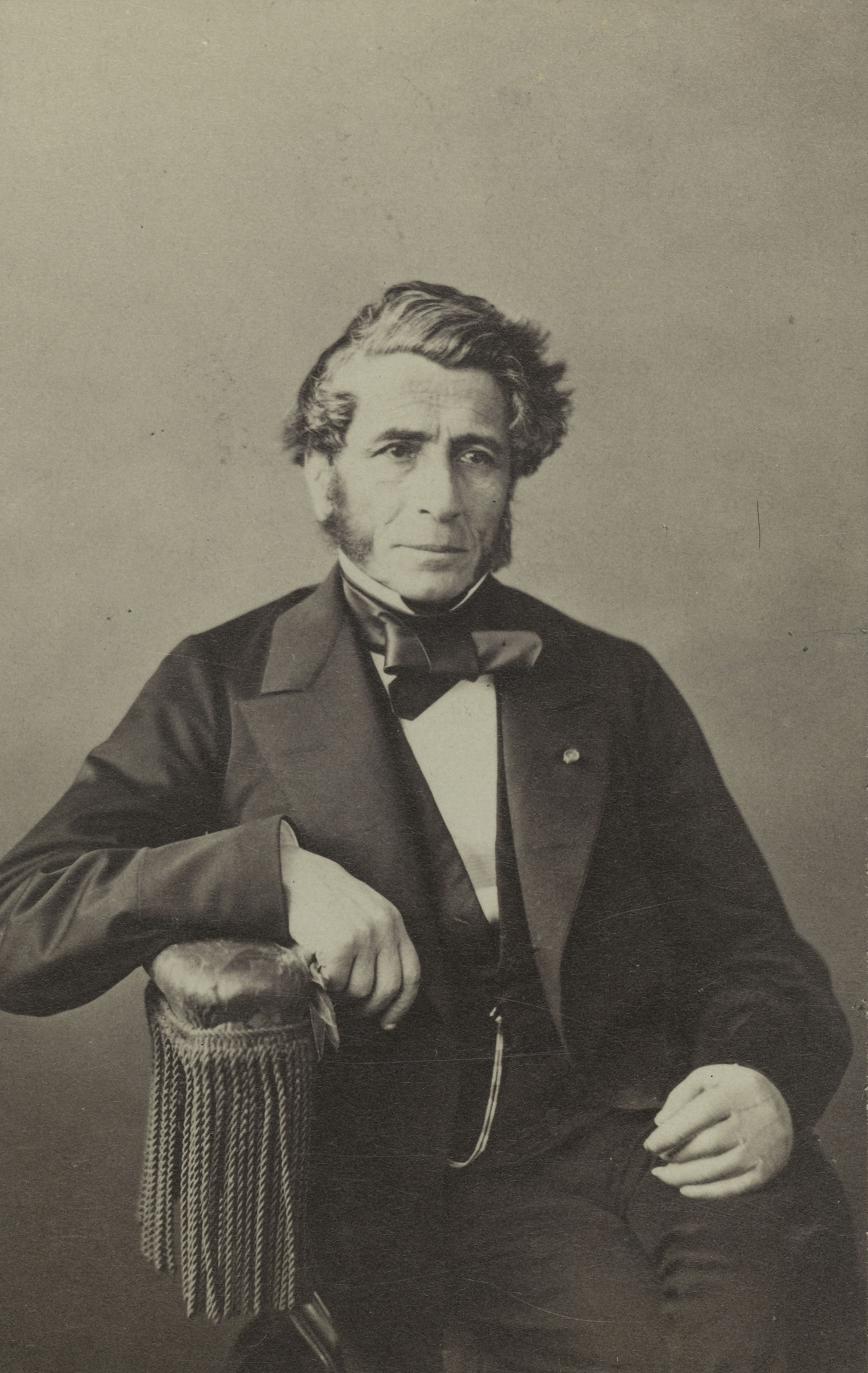
Emile Pereire, the first political figure to propose a railway project in Algeria in 1833.

=== Railway line projects in Algeria prior to the 1857 decree ===
Just a few years after the beginning of France's conquest of Algeria in 1830, politicians, industrialists, and investors proposed various railway line projects in Algeria.

In 1833 the financier and politician Émile Pereire published an article in the French newspaper Le National, in addition to discussing his ideas for the administration and colonization of Algeria, he presented a plan for establishing a railway system connecting Bône (Annaba) and Constantine to Algiers, and Algiers to Oran. According to Pereire:

With the leveling work carried out by the troops, free expropriation, and obtaining rails at half price from England, it would be sufficient for this 150-league line to incur a total expenditure of 20 to 25 million. This investment … would allow for the establishment of an economically efficient system, effectively protecting the entire coast from Bedouin incursions. … when 20 locomotive engines are used, they can transport an army of 18,000 infantry soldiers, 2,000 horse-mounted soldiers, and 45 cannons from Algiers to Oran or Constantine within 24 hours. This capability ensures that there will no longer be a need to worry about serious attacks.

— Émile Pereire, Le National

In 1844 engineer Édouard de Redon put forward a proposal to construct a railway from Algiers to Blida, following the foothills of the Atlas Mountains. At the same time, Frédéric and Eugène Lacroix presented their project for a railway line connecting Philippeville (Skikda) to Constantine, including a port at Stora. M. Garbes also suggested two railway lines in the Oran region: one from Oran to Mostaganem and Hillil (Yellel), and another from Oran to Tlemcen.

In 1854 a group of investors developed a project to establish a comprehensive railway network in Algeria. This plan included multiple lines, such as the Algiers-Oran, Algiers-Constantine, Constantine-Bône with a branch line to Philippeville, Tlemcen-Mascara via Sidi Bel Abbès, and various branch lines to Mostaganem, Ténès, and Bougie (Béjaïa).

While the need for a railway network to promote colonization in Algeria was recognized during the assessment of these projects, the preliminary studies were deemed inadequate as they were either limited to specific regions or driven by private interests focusing on transporting goods from productive areas or mines seeking concessions. To address these concerns and fully facilitate colonization, the governor of Algeria, Jacques Louis Randon, assigned General François de Chabaud-Latour to conduct thorough studies and develop a comprehensive plan for the railway network. It was the outcome of these studies that led to the issuance of the imperial decree in 1857, marking the first concrete plan to establish a railway network in Algeria.

=== First railway line ===
The Algiers–Blida line, which was inaugurated in 1862, is widely recognized as the first railway line in Algeria designed for both passenger and freight transportation. But the real first line was established in 1858 by the Société Civile des Mines et Hauts-Fourneaux des Karezas. This initial railway line spanned 11 km and connected the Karezas iron mine to the Seybouse River port, situated on the outskirts of Annaba. Operating on a meter-gauge track, it commenced operations on September 1, 1859, exclusively for the transportation of ore. Subsequently, it served as the foundation for the future Bône-Saint-Charles line.

=== First railway plan in Algeria: the 1857 program ===
==== Decree of April 8, 1857 ====
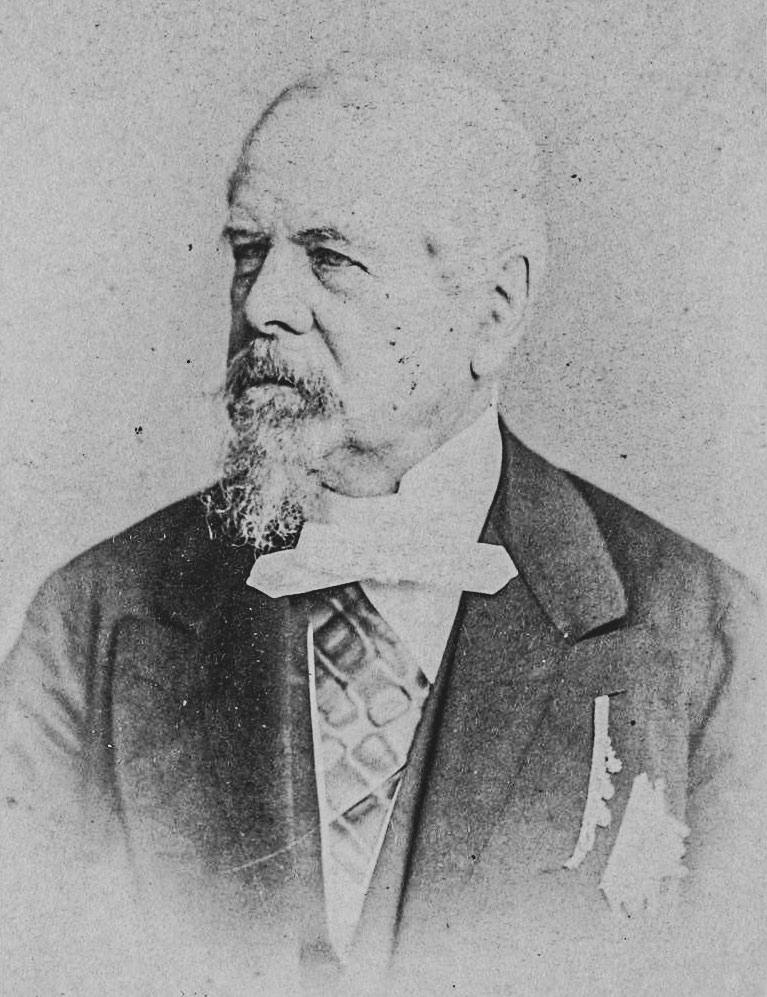
François de Chabaud-Latour, who authored a report emphasizing the need for railway development in Algeria.

After the French conquest of Algeria in 1830, several suggestions were made to establish a railway network that would facilitate the colonization of the region. But no substantial projects were initiated in response to these proposals. It was not until the mid-1850s that General François de Chabaud-Latour, the senior commander of the engineering corps in Algeria, was assigned by Governor Jacques Louis Randon to assess the various suggestions and provide a comprehensive report. In one of his conclusions, he asserted:

To promote colonization, it is important to first develop good transportation routes that allow colonists to export their products to the coast. However, we should not encourage large-scale migration of farmers from the Motherland to Algeria until these infrastructure projects are completed.

— François de Chabaud-Latour

It was only in 1857 that Marshal Vaillant, the Minister of War at the time, presented Emperor Napoleon III with a comprehensive plan for the construction of Algerian railways. The main axes of this plan are as follows:

Sire,

You have deemed it necessary to provide Algeria with railways, to satisfy the existing agricultural interests and accelerate their progressive development. Railways should indeed be considered one of the most powerful factors for the future prosperity of our vast conquest. A railway network encompassing the three provinces will bring life and wealth through the convenient and swift transportation of agricultural and industrial products, as well as facilitate the movement of a growing population of colonists.

…

I have prepared a plan for a comprehensive network of Algerian railways. This network would consist of:

A main line running parallel to the sea, connecting the capitals of the three provinces and serving the major towns. In the east, it would span between Alger and Constantine, and in the west, between Alger and Oran, with a branch line to Tlemcen via Sidi-bel-Abbès.

Lines originating from the main ports and converging onto this main artery, thus connecting Bône and Philippeville to Constantine, Bougie to Sétif, Ténès to Orléansville, and Mostaganem and Arzew to Relizane."

— Jean-Baptiste Philibert Vaillant

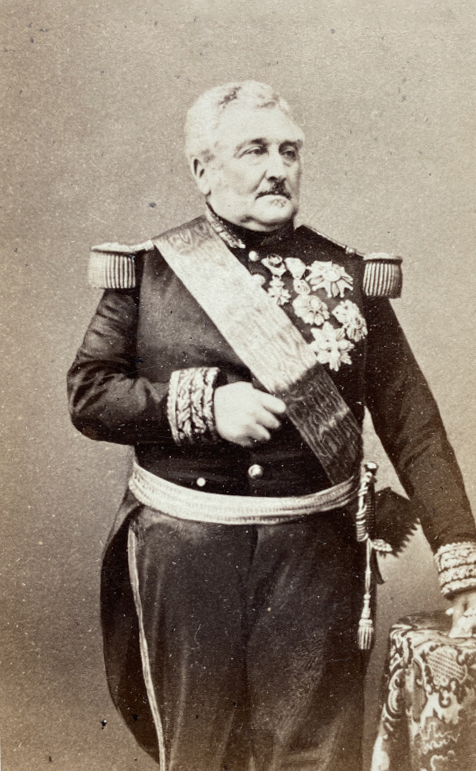
Portrait of Marshal Vaillant, the initiator of the first railway network in Algeria.

The emperor, agreeing with the plan, signed a decree on April 8, 1857, to create a railway network in Algeria. This decree, known as the 1857 Classification Decree, outlined the key aspects of the railway program in Algeria. It proposed the construction of a 1,357 kilometres (843 mi) network, consisting of:

- A main line running parallel to the coast, connecting the capitals of the three provinces: Constantine, Algiers, and Oran. It would pass through or near Aumale (Sour El-Ghozlane), Sétif, Blida, Orléansville (Chlef), Saint-Denis-du-Sig (Sig), and Sainte-Barbe-du-Tlélat (Oued Tlélat), the total length of the line would be approximately 881 km.
- Additionally, there would be six branch lines starting from the main ports and joining the coastal line:
  - From Philippeville to Constantine (87 km);
  - From Bougie to Sétif (110 km);
  - From Bône to Constantine (202 km);
  - From Ténès to Orléansville (58 km);
  - From Arzew and Mostaganem to Relizane (68 km);
  - From Oran to Tlemcen via Sainte-Barbe-du-Tlélat and Sidi Bel Abbès (120 km);

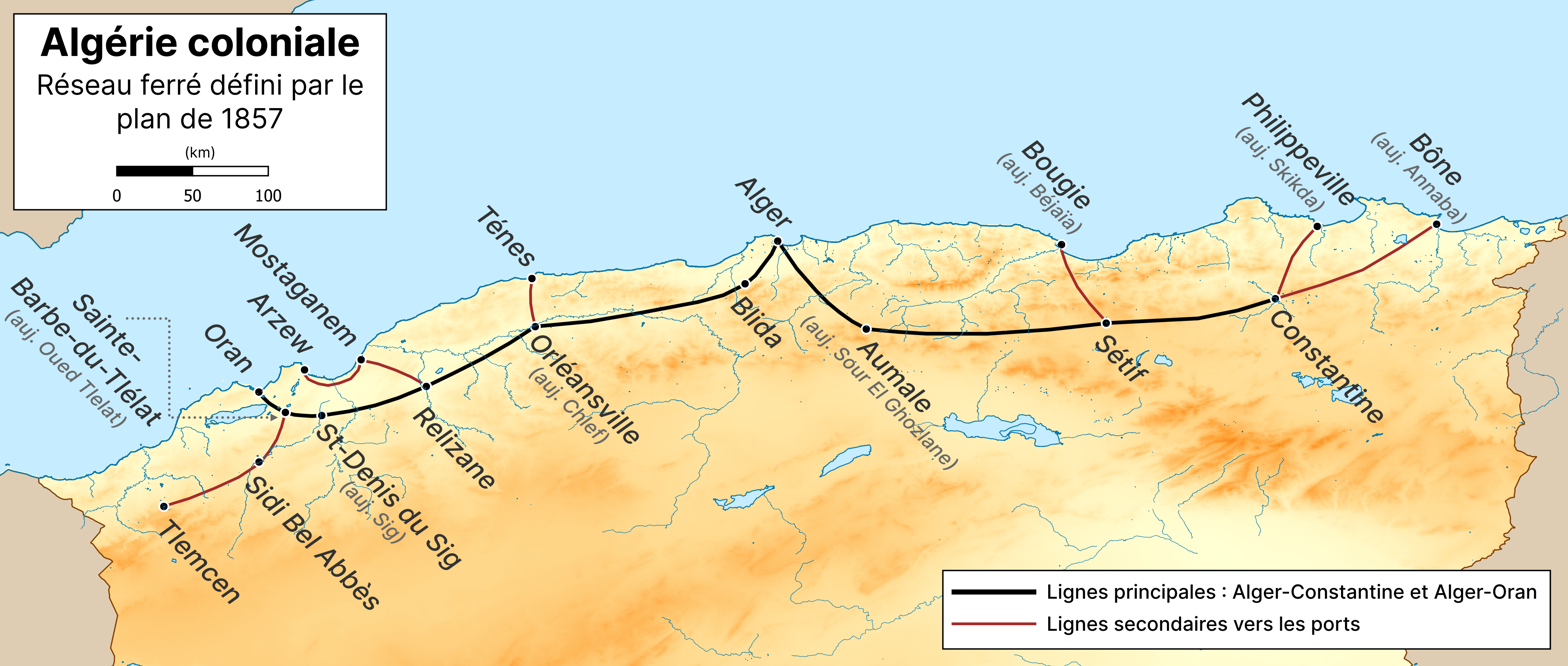
The lines outlined in the 1857 plan

==== Concessions of the first lines to the Algerian Railway Company (CFA) ====
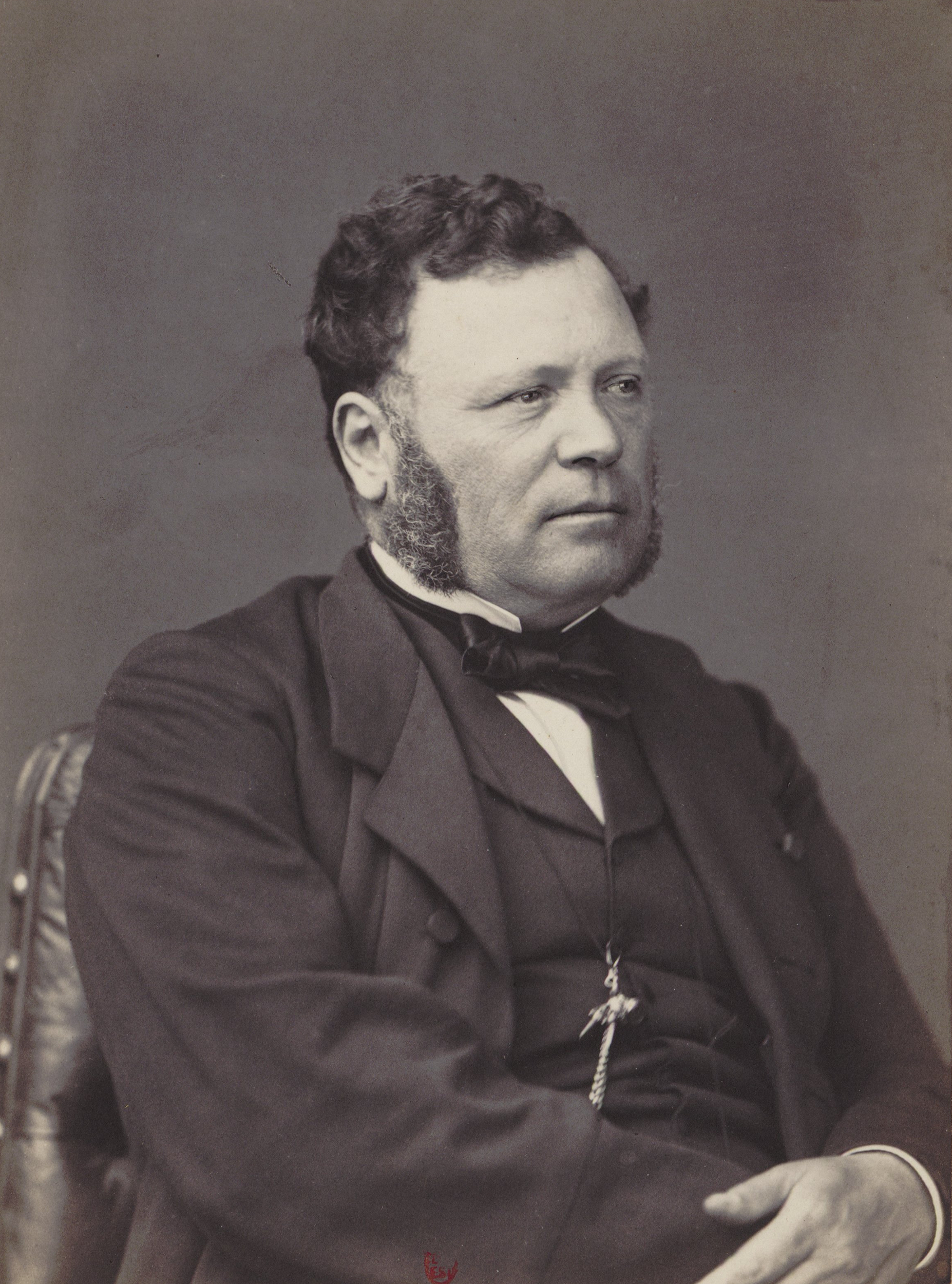
Ferdinand Barrot, President of the CFA Company.

The law of June 20, 1860, declares three sections of the lines planned in the 1857 plan as being of public utility:

- Algiers – Blida (51 km);
- Oran – Saint-Denis-du-Sig (52 km);
- Philippeville – Constantine (87 km);

Only 190 km of railway lines were constructed out of the original plan of 1,357 km.

These short lines were given priority for construction as they connected the three major cities of colonial Algeria: Algiers, Constantine, and Oran. The primary objectives were to facilitate the exploitation of natural resources in these regions and to solidify French presence in Algeria.

The concession for these three lines was granted to a joint-stock company Chemins de Fer Algériens (CFA) (Note: The company was chaired by the Bonapartist Ferdinand Barrot.) through an imperial decree on July 11, 1860. The CFA was specifically established by a group of businessmen, including the director of the Marseille port, who recognized the opportunity to enhance port activity by importing products from the colony.

However, the construction of the Algiers–Blida railway line was initiated in 1859, well before its concession was granted to the Algerian Railway Company (CFA).

==== Reattribution of concessions to the Paris, Lyons, Mediterranean Railway Company (PLM) ====
The Algerian Railway Company (CFA), which was granted the concession for three priority lines in 1860, faced immediate financial challenges. Insufficient subscribed shares (only 33 000 out of 100 000 shares offered) resulted in a lack of capital, leading the company to declare bankruptcy. As a result, in 1863, all concessions were transferred to Chemins de fer de Paris à Lyon et à la Méditerranée (PLM) through the enactment of the June 11, 1863, law.

This redistribution was a decision made by Eugène Rouher, who served as the Minister of Commerce and Public Works. It was a result of his support for the PLM company during a conflict with the company Chemins de fer du Midi over the allocation of the Sète–Marseille line. As the PLM company emerged victorious from the dispute, the minister imposed the transfer of concessions from the CFA to the PLM as a form of compensation. The PLM gladly accepted the minister's decision, seeing it as a favorable outcome. In fact, the PLM management informed its shareholders that they anticipated certain indirect benefits from the completion of the Algerian railway network. They noted that their metropolitan network, which serviced the region facing Algeria, would now handle all traffic travelling to and from Algeria, thereby increasing their overall rail traffic. They also emphasized their keen interest in the creation and expansion of railway lines in Algeria.

Consequently, the PLM company became the concessionaire for 543 km of railway lines in Algeria, including the entire Algiers–Oran line :

- The section from Algiers to Blida (51 km) of the Algiers–Oran line;
- The section from Blida to Saint-Denis-du-Sig (348 km) of the Algiers–Oran line;
- The section from Saint-Denis-du-Sig to Oran (59 km) of the Algiers–Oran line;
- The Philippeville to Constantine line (85 km);

By acquiring these concessions, the PLM, which already operated an extensive railway network in mainland France, now extended its reach from Marseille, the primary port for journeys to Algiers, all the way into Algeria.

==== Execution of the 1857 plan's lines ====
The French government launched the construction of the Algiers to Blida section, which is the primary segment of the Algiers–Oran line, without waiting for the declaration of public utility. The construction work commences on December 12, 1859. Initially, it is the French Army that takes on the task of building the railway line. The first section, connecting Algiers to Oran, is completed and opens for goods transportation on September 8, 1862, followed by passenger services on October 25, 1862.

Sketches from the article "Inauguration of the Algiers-Blida railway" in the journal L'Illustration, 20 August 1862

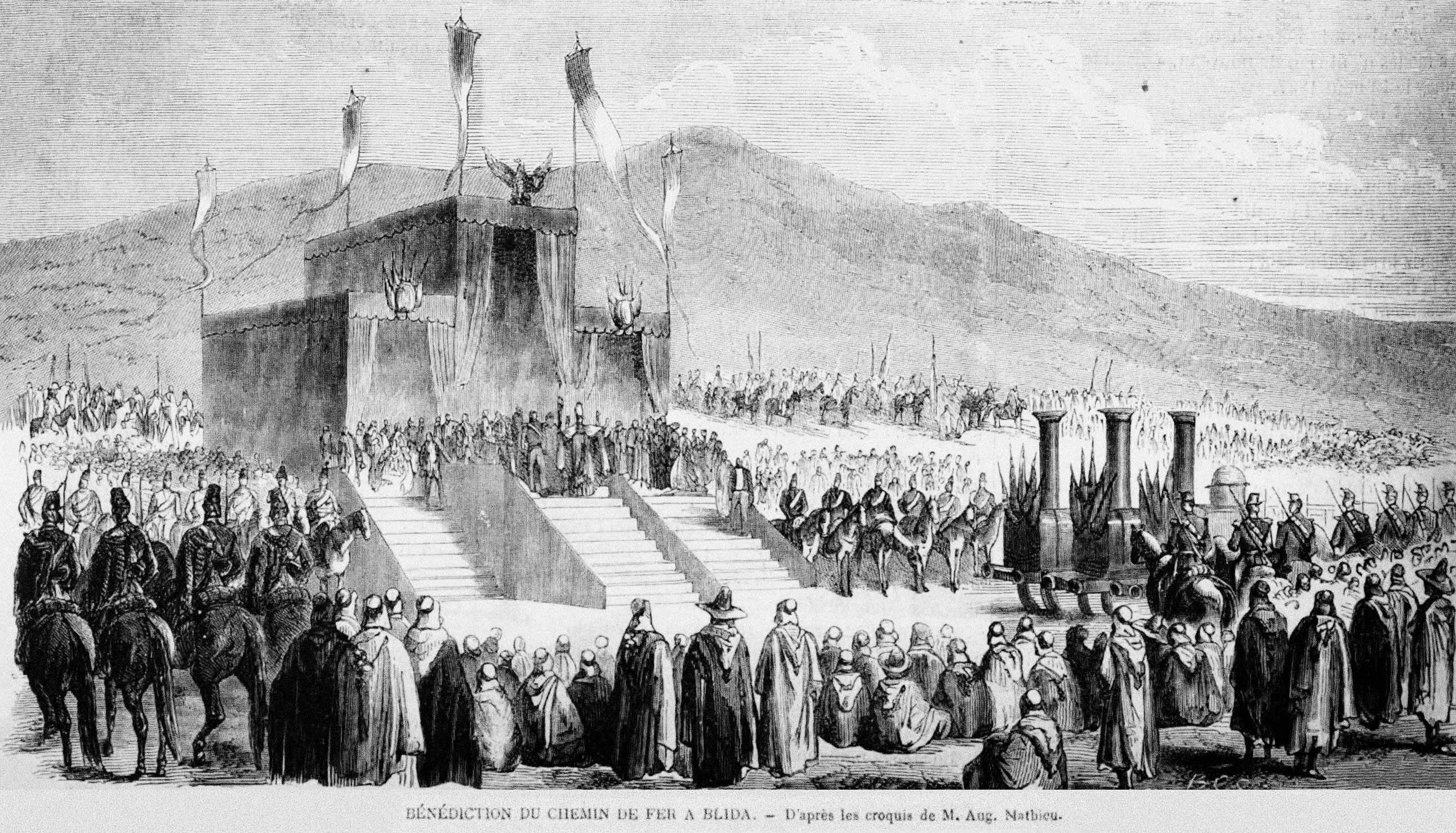
Blessing of the Algiers-Blida railway

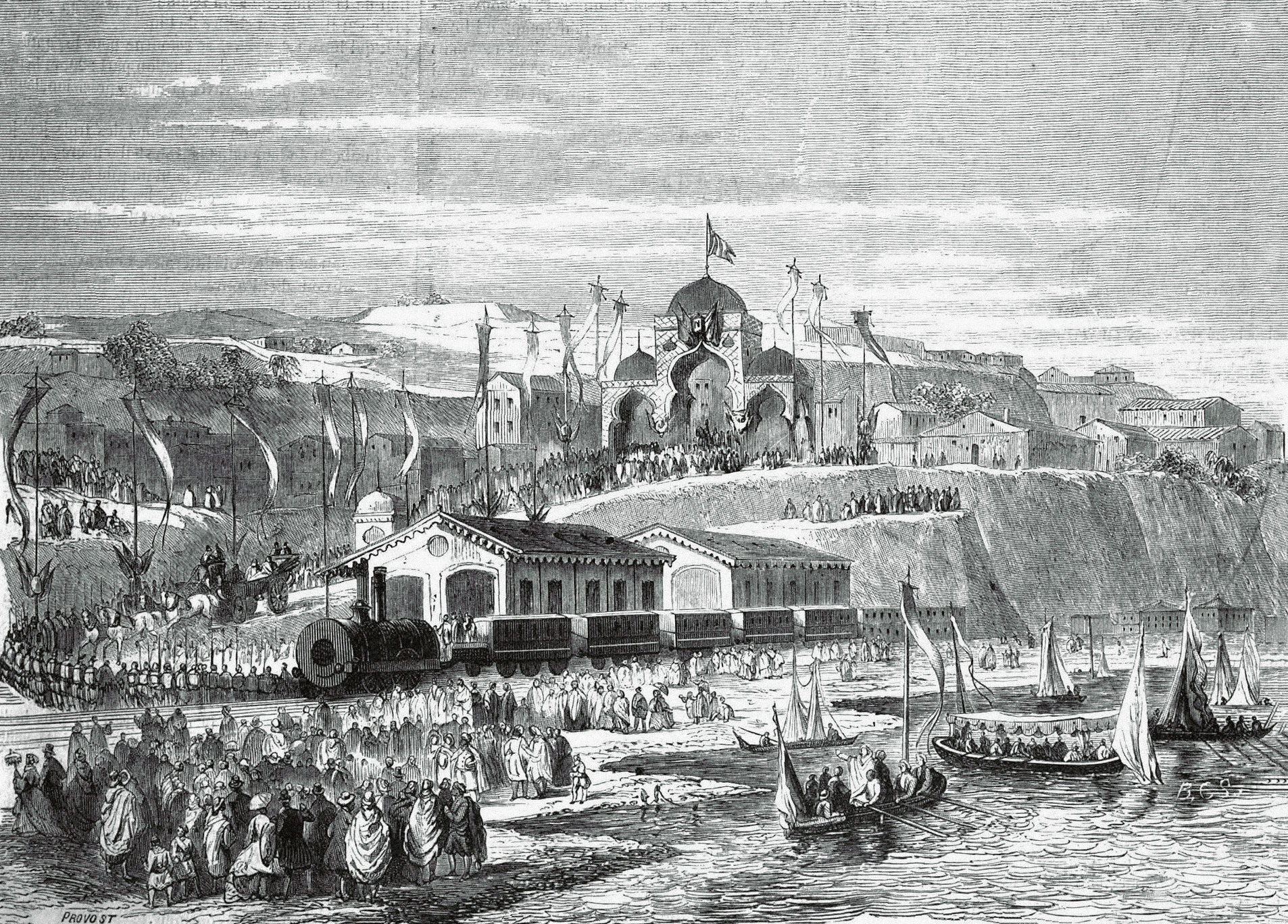
Inaugural train of the Algiers-Blida railway

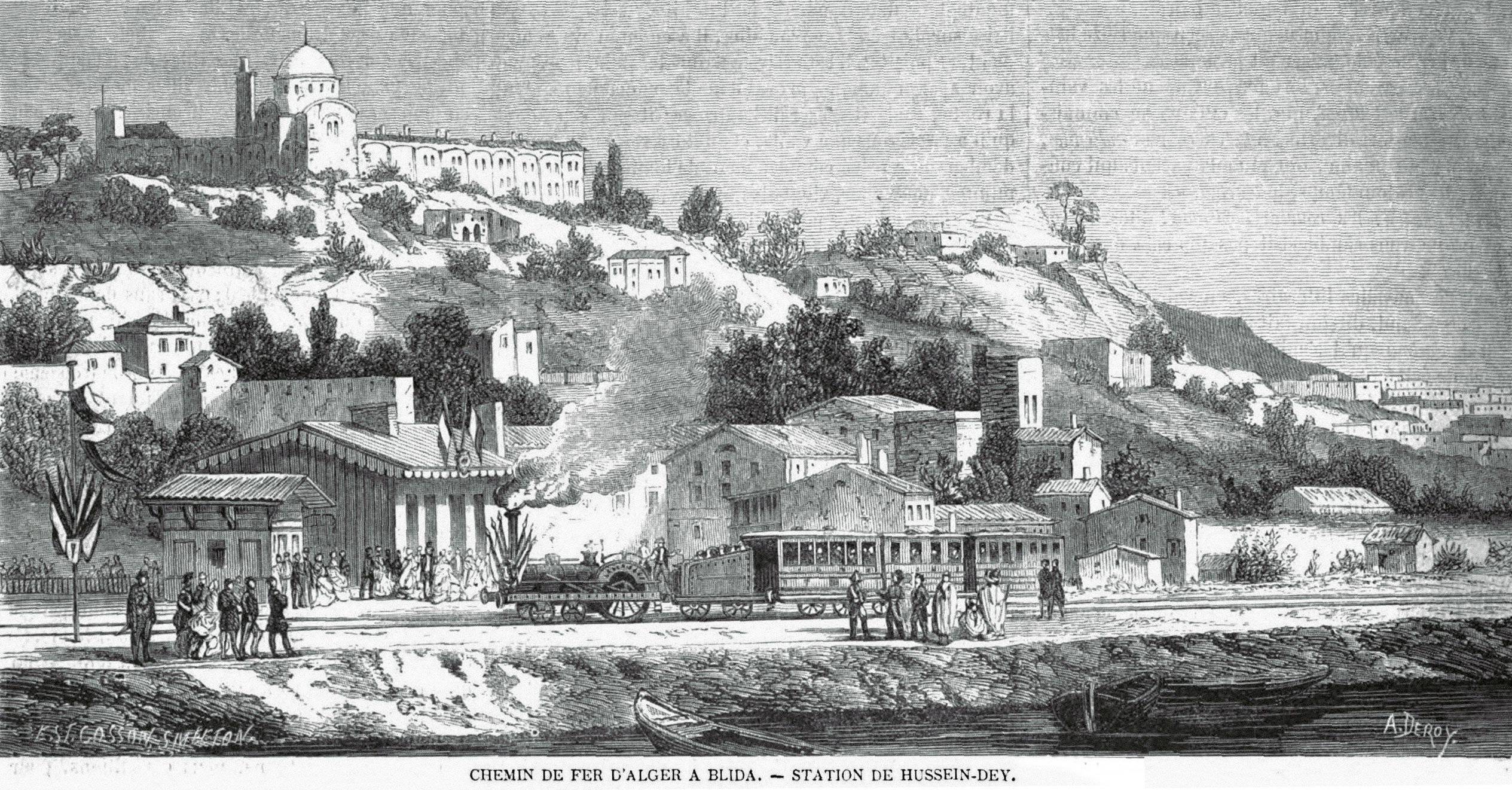
Hussein-Dey station on the Alger-Blida line

The Algiers-Oran railway line was gradually opened in multiple stages:

- The Algiers to Blida section was inaugurated on October 25, 1862;
- The Oran to Relizane section was opened on November 1, 1868;
- The Blida to Boumedfaa section was completed on July 8, 1869;
- The Relizane to Affreville (now Khemis Miliana) section was put into service on September 1, 1870.
- Finally, the Affreville to Boumedfaa section was opened on May 1, 1871.

As a result the entire 420 km-long line was fully operational in 1871, marking the completion of the project 12 years after construction began;

Compilation of station views along the Algiers-Oran line

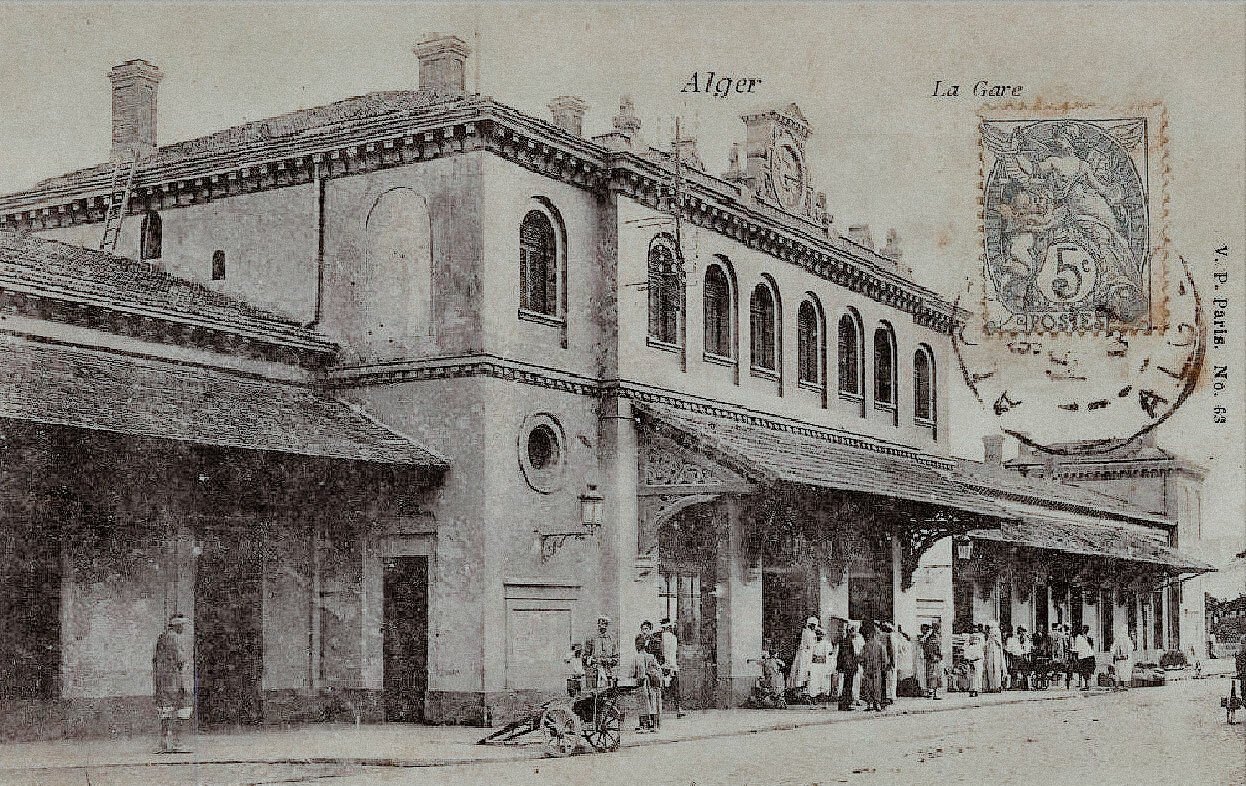
Algiers

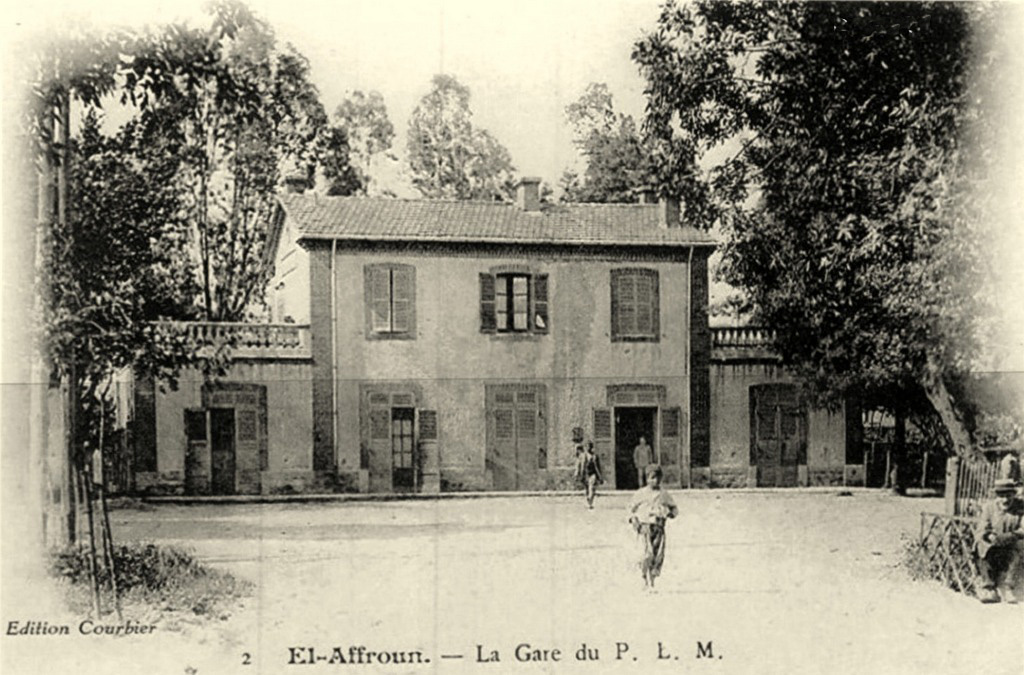
El Affroun

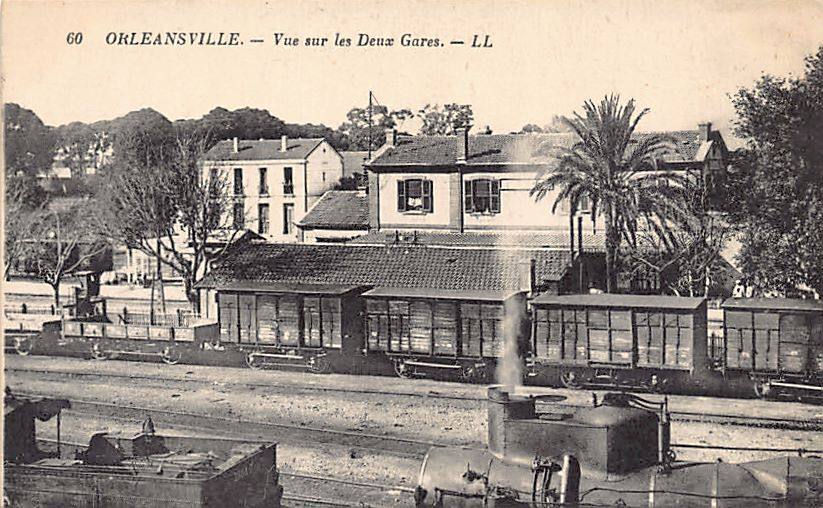
Orléansville (now Chlef)

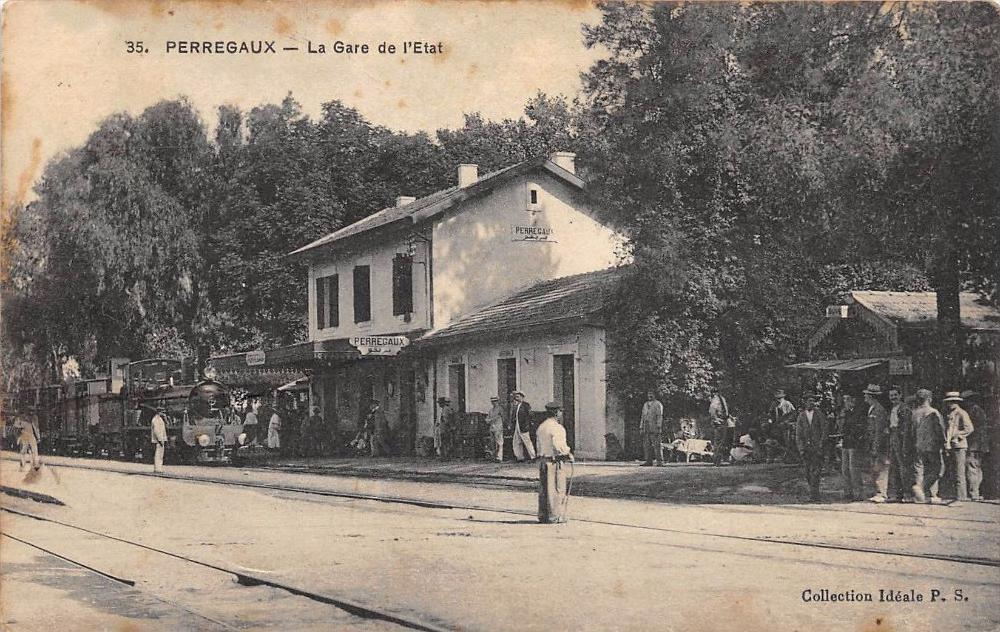
Perregaux (now Mohammadia)

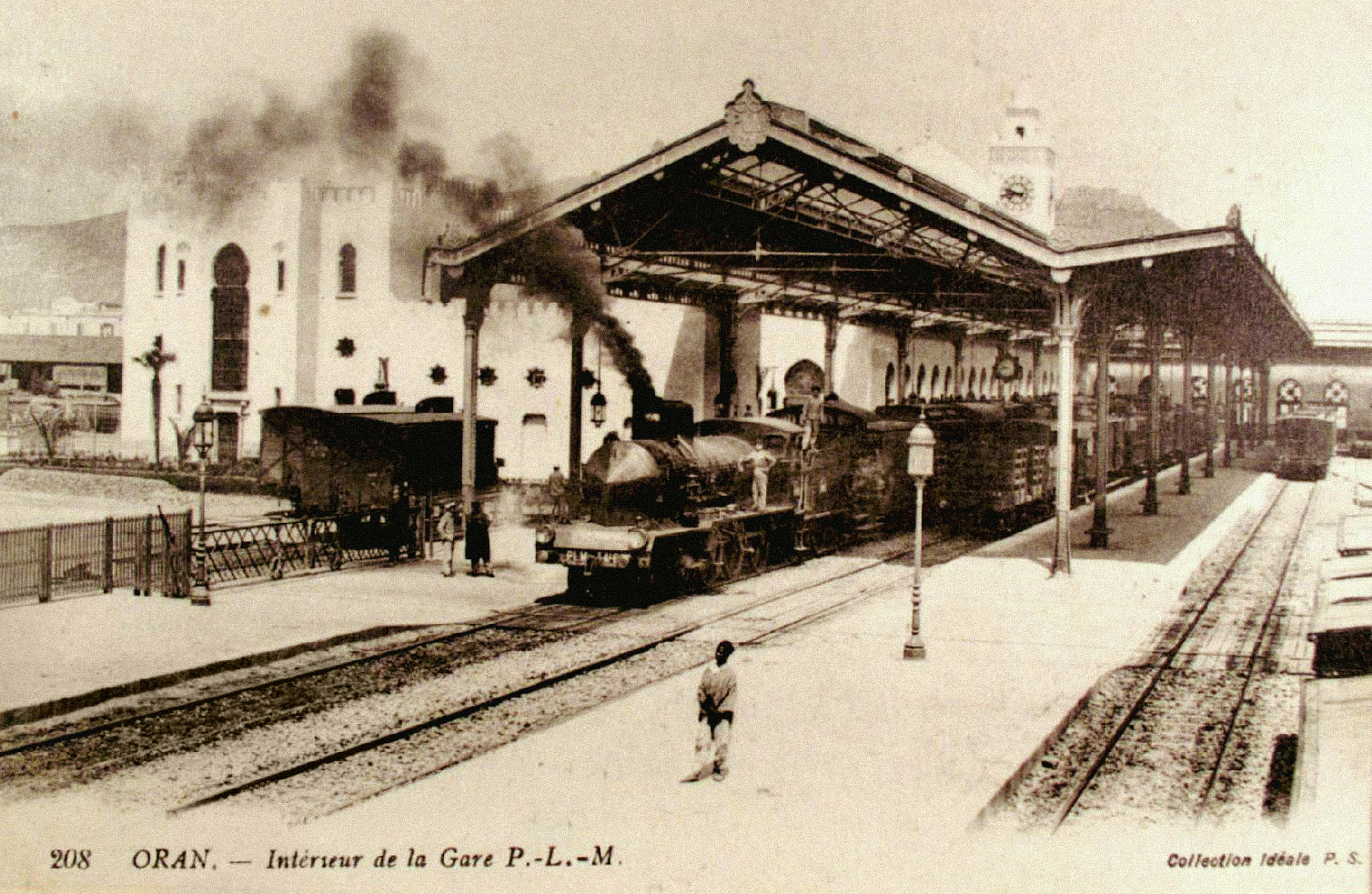
Oran

==== Philippeville–Constantine line ====
Originally granted to the CFA company in 1860, the concession for the Philippeville–Constantine railway line was transferred to the PLM in 1863 following the former's bankruptcy. The construction of this line was undertaken by the new company.

The line was officially opened on September 1, 1870. With a length of 87 km, it was later connected to the Constantine to Alger line, which was fully operational in 1886, forming the present-day Algiers to Skikda line.

==== Other lines of the first plan ====
Not all of the other lines outlined in the initial plan were fully realized. Some underwent changes in their routes, while others were never built :

- Algiers–Constantine line: The declaration of public utility (DUP) for this line was issued on December 15, 1875. The first concession, covering the section from Constantine to Sétif, was granted on the same date. The remaining sections of the line were granted in separate concessions between 1877 and 1880. The entire line was finally opened in 1886.
- Bougie–Sétif line: This line was never constructed. Instead, a connection between Beni Mansour, on the Algiers to Constantine line, and Bougie (now Béjaïa) was preferred and put into operation in 1889.
- Bône–Constantine line: The original planned route for this line was not followed. Instead, a line connecting Bône (now Annaba) to Saint-Charles (now Ramdane Djamel), a town on the Philippeville–Constantine line, was preferred. This line, completed in 1904, currently forms the Ramdane Djamel to Annaba line.
- Ténès–Orléansville line (now Chlef): This line was not constructed as part of the initial plan.
- Arzew and Mostaganem to Relizane line: This line was not built according to the initial plan.
- Sainte-Barbe-du-Tlélat (now Oued Tlelat) to Tlemcen line, via Sidi Bel Abbès: This line was not constructed as part of the initial plan.
Compilation of station views along the Algiers-Constantine line

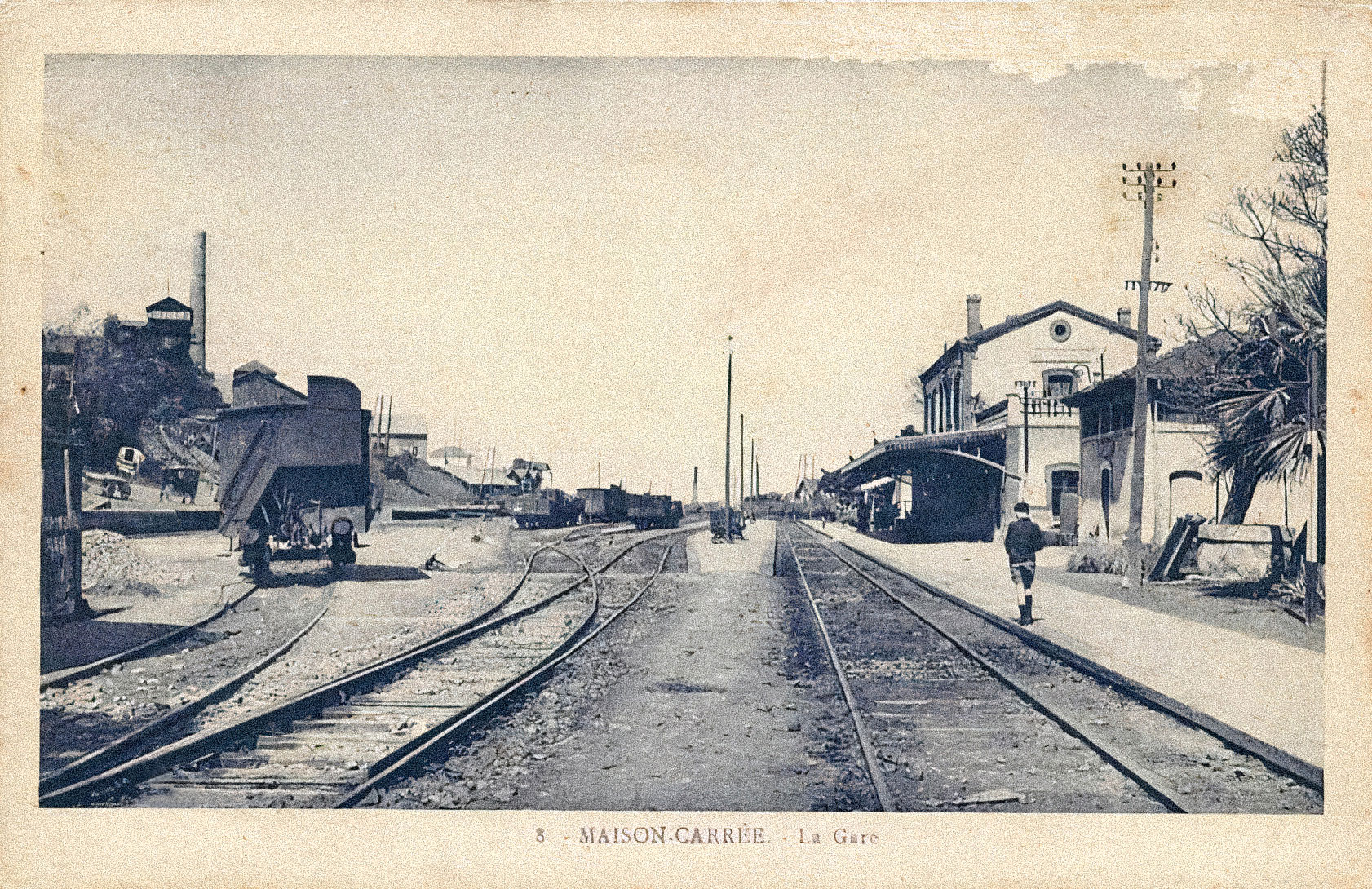
Maison-Carrée (now El Harrach)

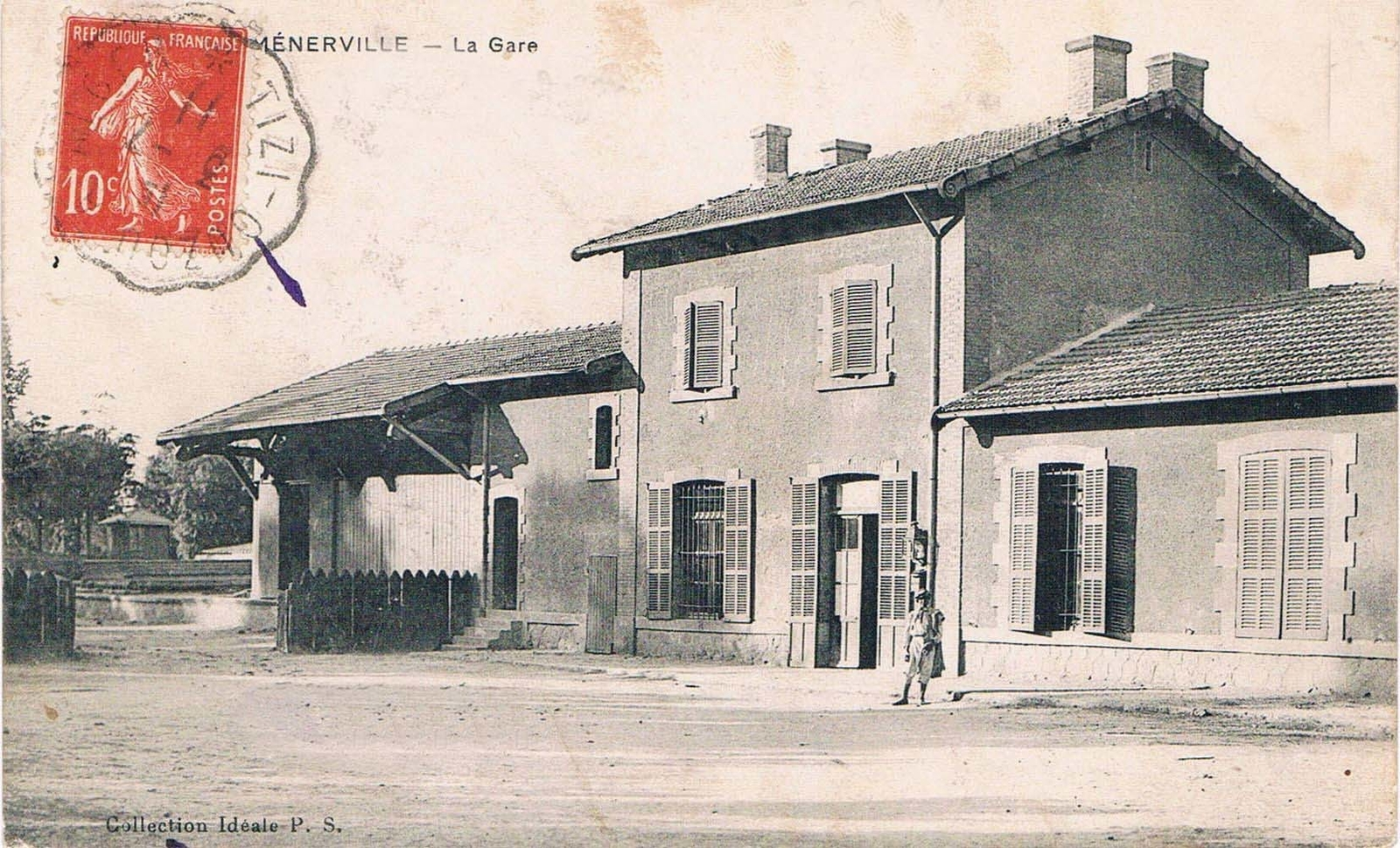
Ménerville (now Thénia)

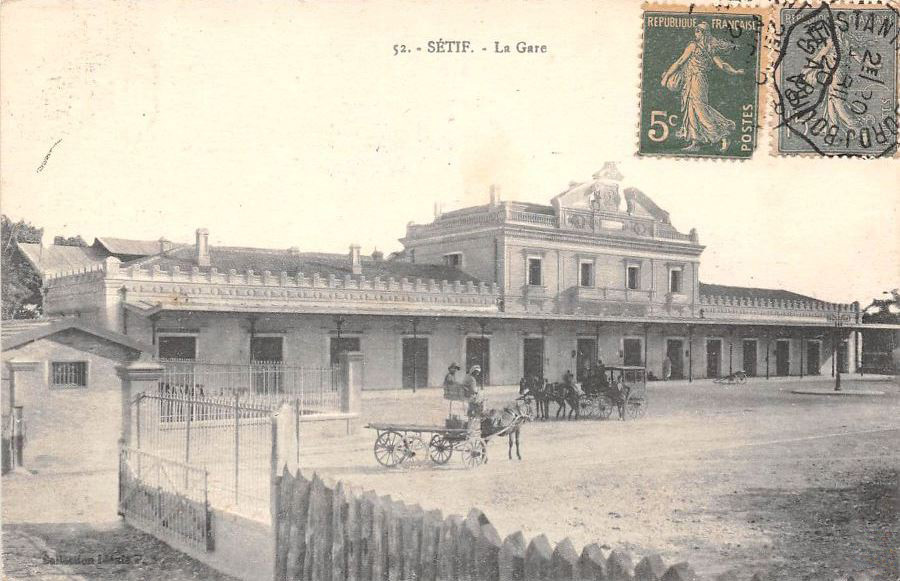
Sétif

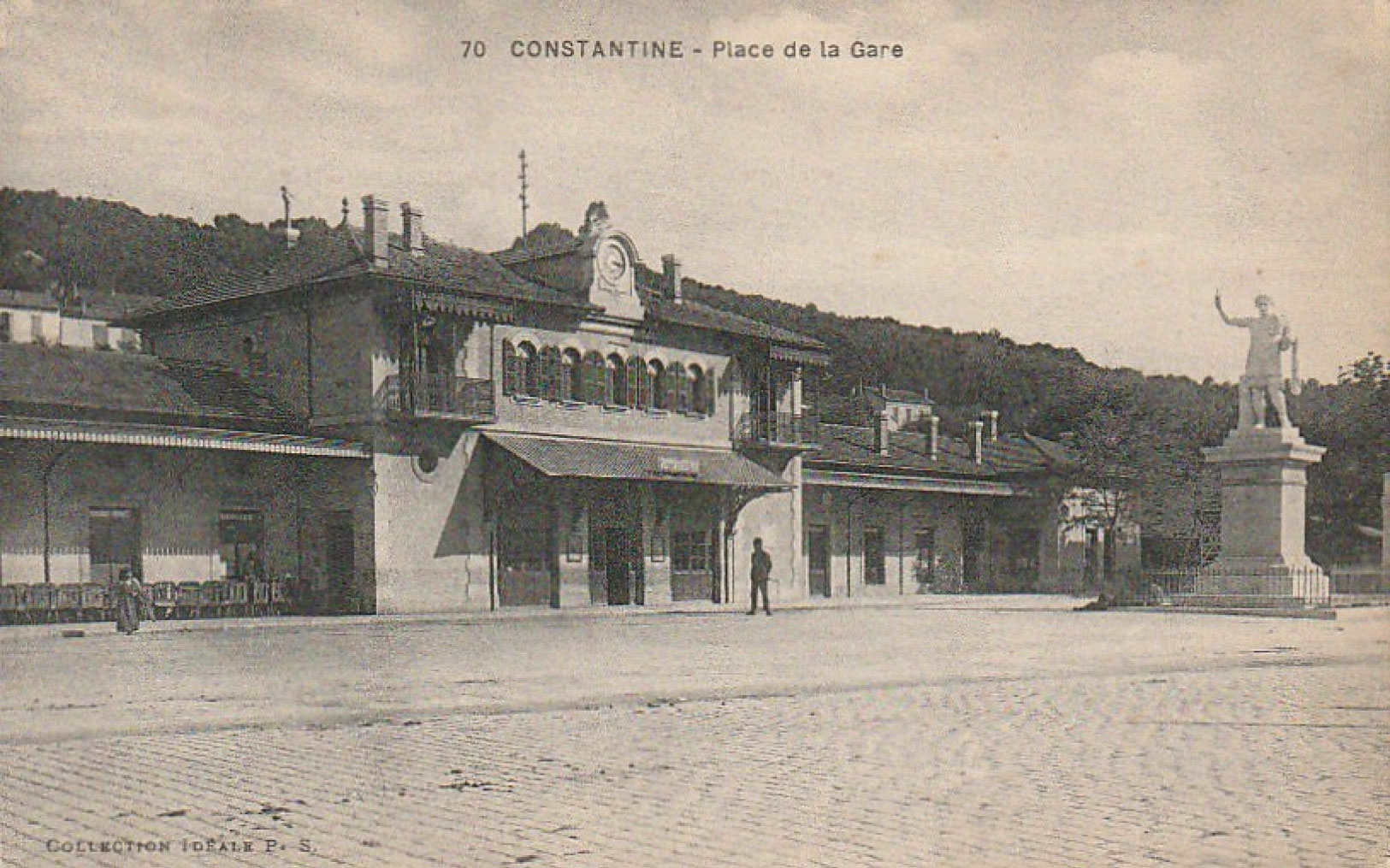
Constantine

==== Lines outside the 1857 plan ====
The governor's decree on June 2, 1863, allowed for the extension of the Karesas Mines railway line to the Seybouse port in Bône (now Annaba), both towards the north and west, reaching the area of Aïn Mokra (Berrahal).

=== Second railway plan in Algeria: the 1874 program ===
==== Decrees of 1874 authorizing the creation of local interest lines ====
The decree of April 29, 1874, approves the agreements reached between the Governor-General of Algeria and the Compagnie franco-algérienne (FA) for the concession of a railway line from Arzew to Saïda, with an extension of 70 km in the direction of Geryville (now El Bayadh). The concession is granted to the FA company without subsidy or interest guarantee, but with the exclusive privilege of exploiting the alfa on 300 000 hectares of land in the Hautes Plaines region; the line will transport alfa to the port of Arzew for importation to mainland France.

The decree of May 7, 1874, transposes the French law of July 12, 1865, on local interest railways to Algeria. Until that date, no departmental line had been conceded in Algeria.

==== The lines of the second plan ====
The decree of May 7, 1874, allowed for the granting of concessions to three additional railway companies :

- Société de construction des Batignolles (SCB), later known as Compagnie des chemins de fer Bône-Guelma (BG);
- Compagnie de l'Ouest algérien (COA);
- Compagnie de l'Est algérien (CEA).

Concessions granted by the 1874 program.
Companies	Lines	Dates
Compagnie franco-algérienne	Arzew–Saïda with extension to Geryville (El Bayadh)	April 29, 1874
Société de construction des Batignolles then merged into the Compagnie des chemins de fer Bône-Guelma	Bône–Guelma	May 7, 1874
Société de construction des Batignolles then merged into the Compagnie des chemins de fer Bône-Guelma	Duvivier–Souk Ahras with extension to Sidi El Hemissi (at the Tunisian border)	March 26, 1877
Société de construction des Batignolles then merged into the Compagnie des chemins de fer Bône-Guelma	Guelma–Le Kroubs	March 26, 1877
Compagnie de l'Ouest algérien	Saint-Barbe-du-Tlelat–Sidi Bel Abbès	November 30, 1874
Compagnie de l'Est algérien	Constantine–Sétif	December 15, 1875
Compagnie de l'Est algérien	Maison-Carrée–Alma	December 20, 1877
Compagnie de l'Est algérien	Alma–Ménerville	December 3, 1878

Thus, in 1878, five companies were granted concessions for the construction and operation of railway lines in Algeria.

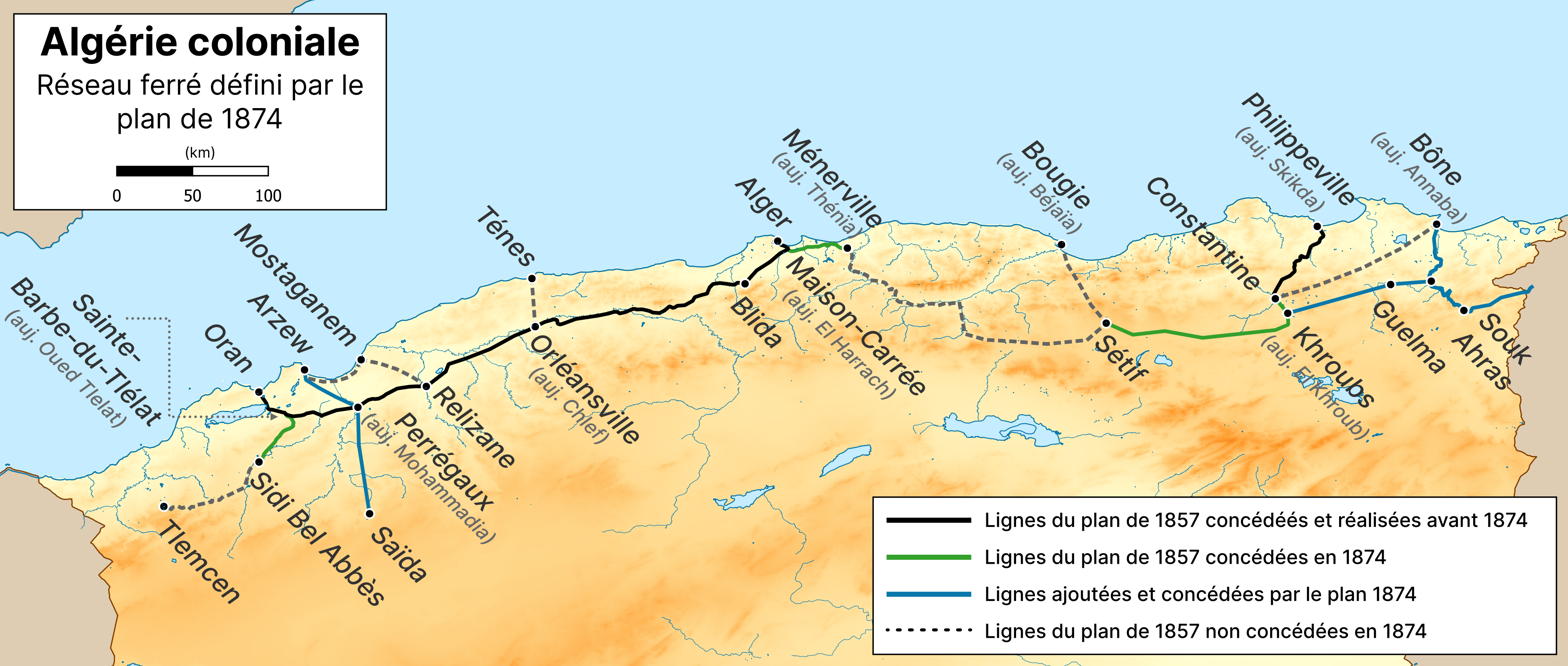
Lines from the 1857 and 1874 plans.

=== Third Railway Plan in Algeria: the 1879 Program ===
==== Law of July 18, 1879: New Lines of General Interest and Reclassification of Local Interest Lines ====
The law of July 18, 1879, defines a new comprehensive plan, known as the classification plan, which incorporates the provisions of the 1857 plan while adapting it to the lines created or conceded later as part of the 1874 program.

This new plan allows for the creation of 1,747 km (1,086 mi) of new lines, added to the 1,079 km (670 mi) of already built lines, forming a cohesive network.

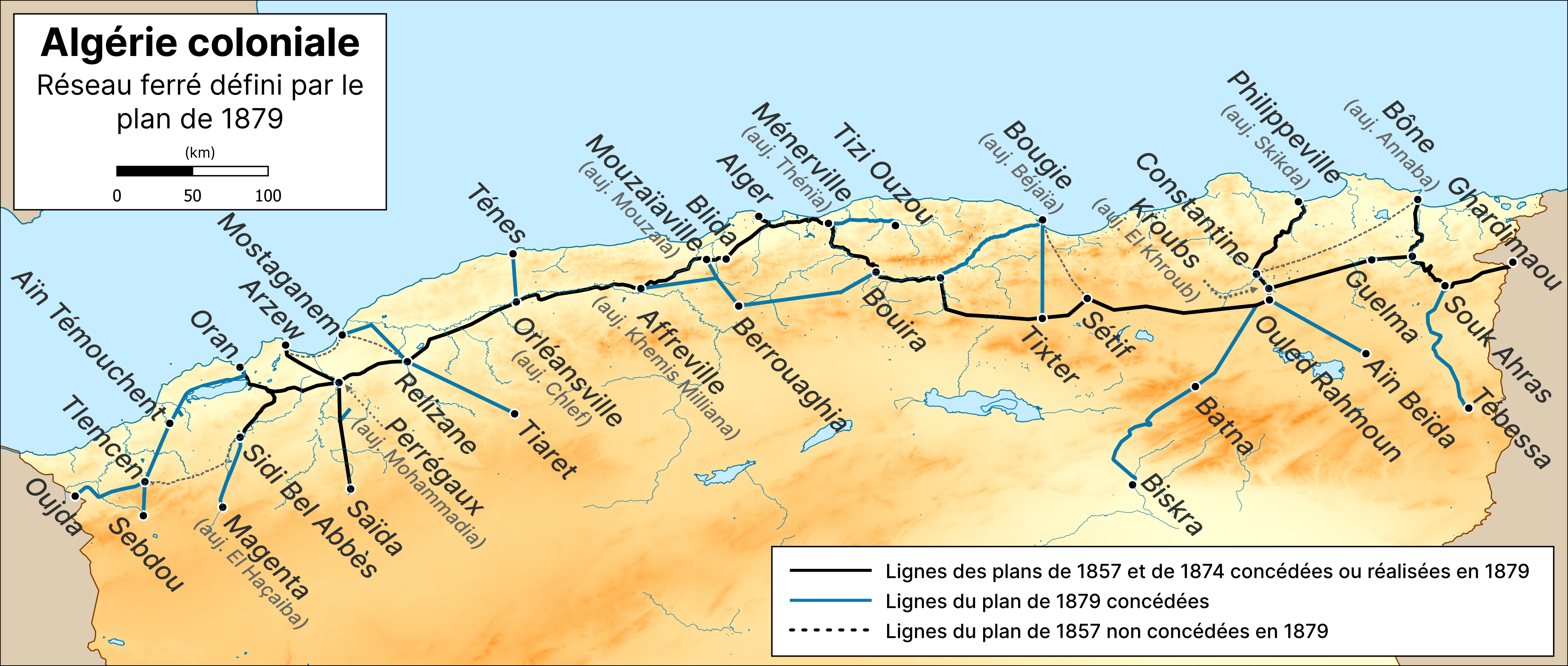
Lines from the 1857, 1874, and 1879 plans.

==== Lines of the Third Plan ====
The 1879 plan envisions the construction of twenty new lines classified in the general network:

- from La Sénia, on the Oran to Sainte-Barbe-du-Tlelat line, to Tlemcen via Aïn Témouchent (145 km (90 mi));
- from Tlemcen to the Moroccan border (58 km (36 mi));
- from the mining massif of Rio-Salado to the La Sénia to Aïn Témouchent line (25 km (16 mi));
- from Sebdou to the Tlemcen to the Moroccan border line (45 km (28 mi));
- from Sidi Bel Abbès to Magenta (61 km (38 mi));
- from Mostaganem to Tiaret, via Aïn Tedles and Relizane (179 km (111 mi));
- from Mascara to Aïn Tizi (12 km (7.5 mi));
- from Ténès to Orléansville (58 km (36 mi));
- from Affreville to Haouch-Moghzen (48 km (30 mi));
- from Mouzaïaville to Berrouaghia via Haouch-Moghzen (96 km (60 mi));
- from Berrouaghia to the Trembles (70 km (43 mi));
- from the Trembles to Bourdj-Bouira (30 km (19 mi));
- from Ménerville to Tizi Ouzou (56 km (35 mi));
- from Beni Mansour to Bougie (97 km (60 mi));
- from Tixter to Bougie (85 km (53 mi));
- from El Guerrah to Batna (80 km (50 mi));
- from Batna to Biskra (115 km (71 mi));
- from Aïn Beida to Ouled Rahmoune, on the Constantine to Sétif line (80 km (50 mi));
- from Souk Ahras to Tébessa (126 km (78 mi));

and the incorporation into the general network of local lines already conceded in the 1874 program:

- from Sainte-Barbe-du-Tlelat, on the Oran to Algiers line, to Sidi Bel Abbes (51 km (32 mi));
- from Maison-Carrée to Ménerville, on the Algiers to Constantine line (43 km (27 mi));
- from Ménerville to Sétif, on the Algiers to Constantine line (254 km (158 mi)).

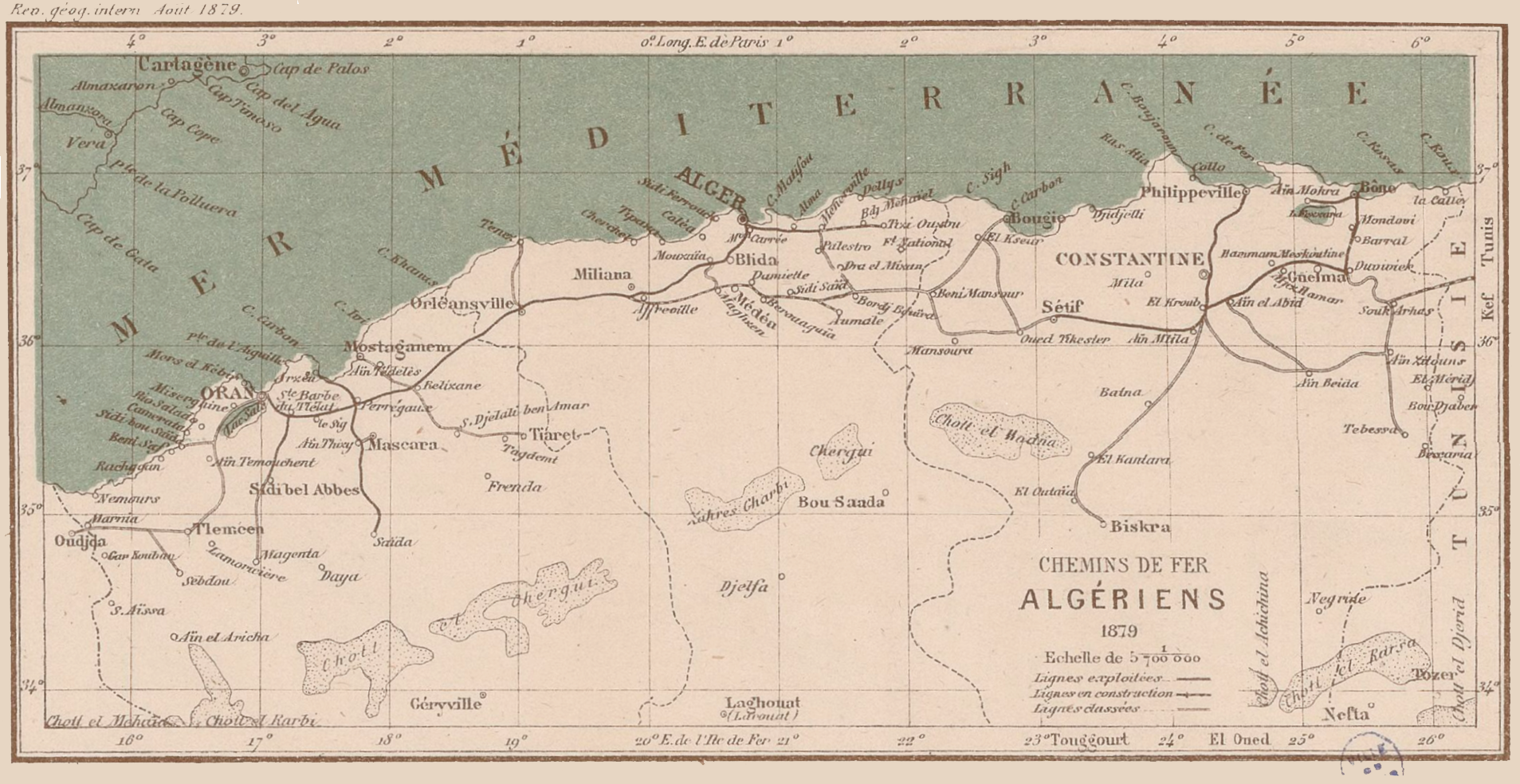
Map of Algerian railways in 1879.

==== Evolution of the network from 1880 to 1900 ====
By 1880, the Algerian railway network already consists of 1,150 km (710 mi) of tracks. The laws implementing the 1879 plan triple its length.

Between 1880 and 1900 several laws are enacted to grant concessions to railway companies for the construction and operation of the lines in the 1879 plan. The table below lists these concessions.

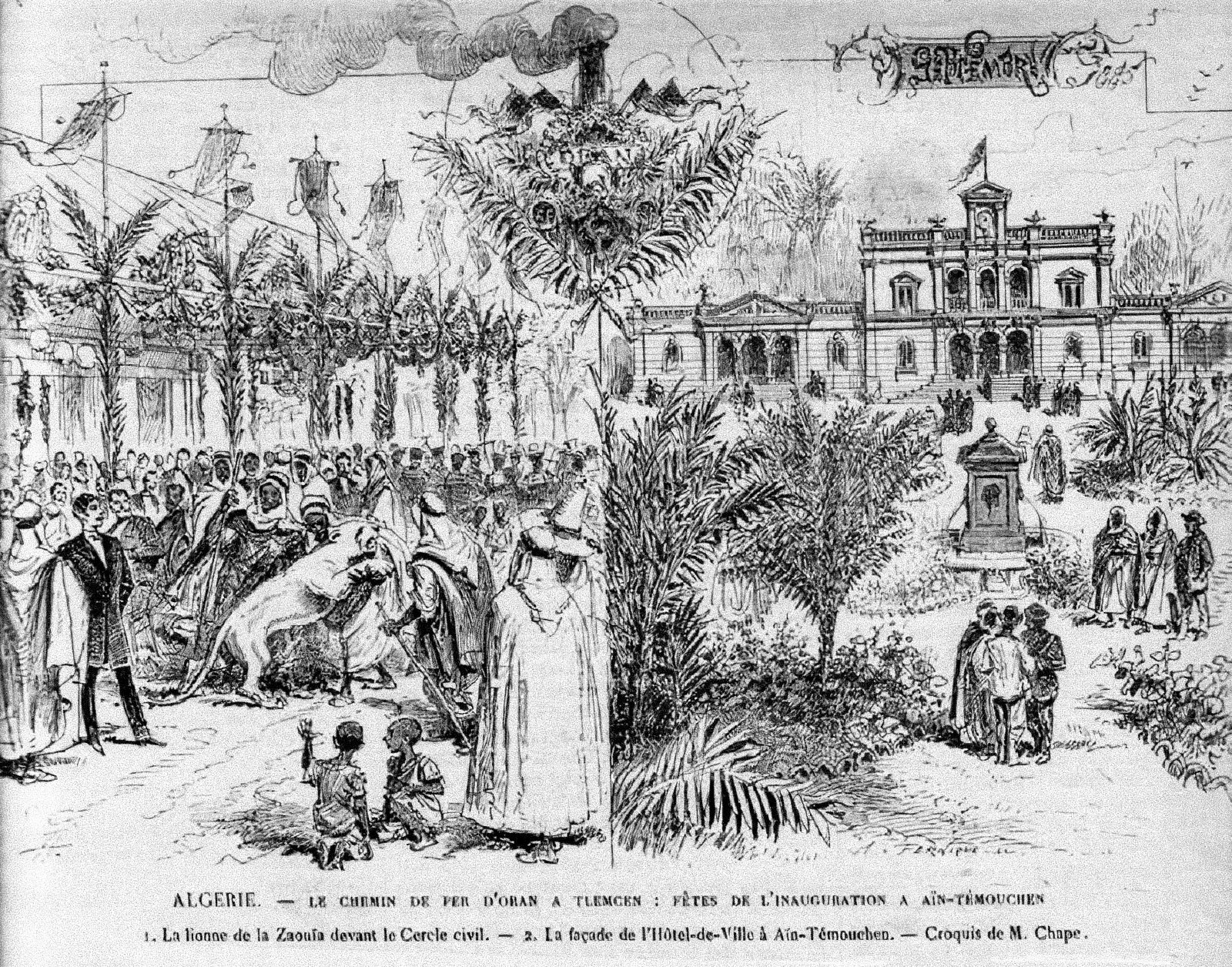
Inauguration of the Oran–Tlemcen line in 1885 (the extension from Aïn Témouchent to Tlemcen was not realized; the Tabia–Tlemcen line was built instead).

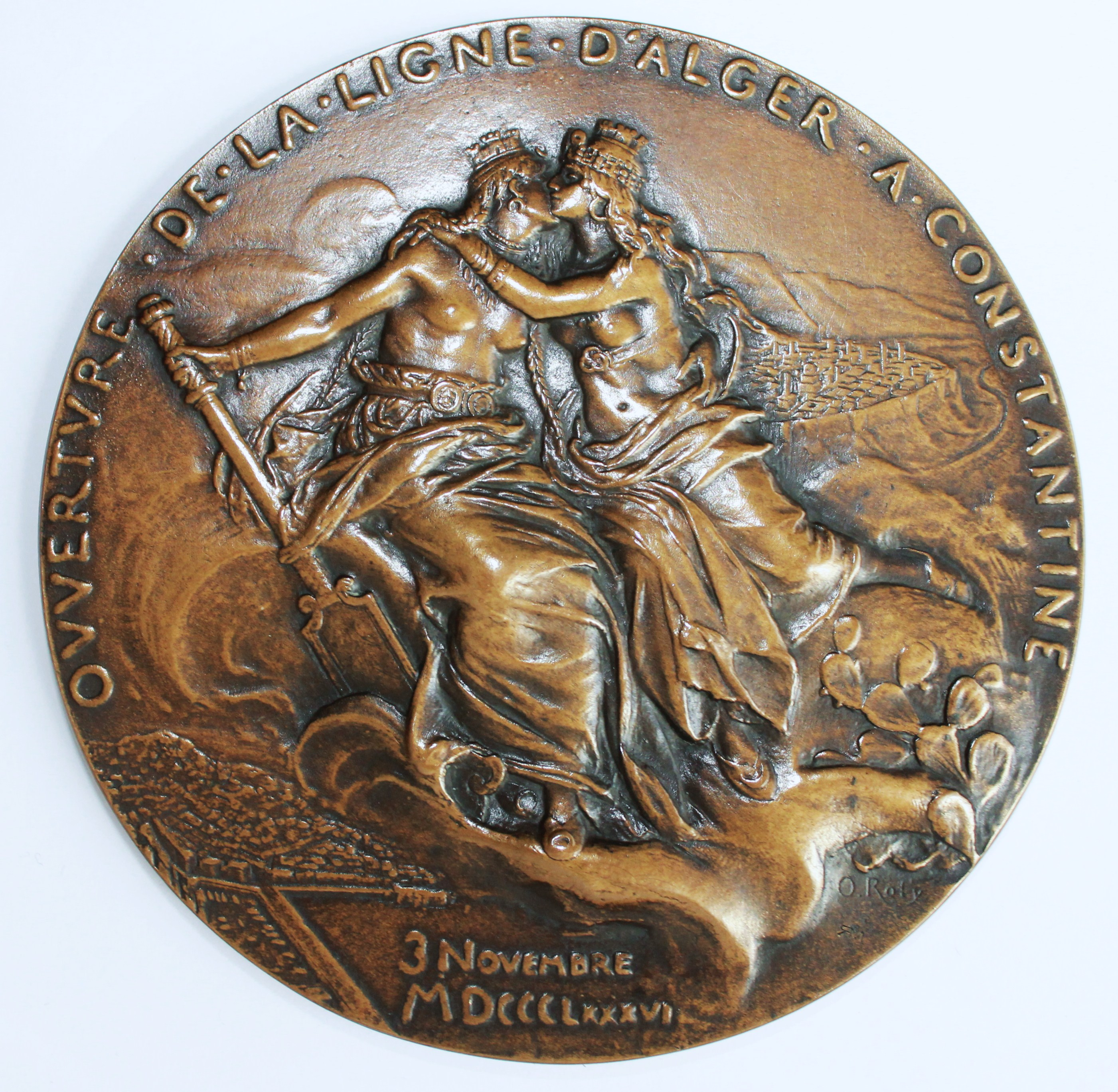
Medal of the Compagnie de l'Est algérien commemorating the opening of the Algiers to Constantine line in 1886.

Concessions granted under the 1879 program.
Companies	Lines	Dates
Compagnie de l'Est algérien	Maison-Carrée–l'Alma • l'Alma–Ménerville • Ménerville–Sétif • El Guerrah–Batna	August 2, 1880
Compagnie de l'Est algérien	Ménerville–Tizi-Ouzou	August 23, 1883
Compagnie de l'Est algérien	Beni Mansour–Bougie	May 21, 1884
Compagnie de l'Est algérien	Batna–Biskra	July 21, 1884
Compagnie de l'Est algérien	Aïn Beida–Ouled Rahmoune	August 7, 1885
Compagnie de l'Ouest algérien	Sidi Bel Abbes – Magenta et prolongement jusqu'à Ras El Ma	August 22, 1881
Compagnie de l'Ouest algérien	La Sénia–Aïn Témouchent	August 5, 1882
Compagnie de l'Ouest algérien	Tabia–Tlemcen par Lamoricière (replaces the line from Aïn Témouchent to Tlemcen initially planned in the 1879 program)	July 16, 1885
Compagnie de l'Ouest algérien	Blida – Berrouaghia et prolongement vers Boghari (replaces the line from Mouzaïaville to Berrouaghia planned in the 1879 program)	July 31, 1886
Compagnie franco-algérienne	Mostaganem–Tiaret • Mascara–Aïn Tizi • Saïda–Mécheria (except for the section from Modzbah to Mécheria, which will be conceded later)	August 8, 1881
Compagnie franco-algérienne	Aïn Tizi–Mascara	July 3, 1884
Compagnie franco-algérienne	Mostaganem–Tiaret via Aïn Tédeles	April 15, 1885
Compagnie franco-algérienne	Modzbah–Mécheria	July 28, 1885
Compagnie franco-algérienne	Mécheria–Aïn Sefra	July 31, 1886
Compagnie des chemins de fer Bône-Guelma	Souk Ahras–Sidi El Hemessi	April 20, 1882
Compagnie des chemins de fer Bône-Guelma	Souk Ahras–Tébessa	July 28, 1885
French State (Ministry of Public Works)	Aïn Sefra–Djeniene Bourezg	January 25, 1892
French State (Ministry of Public Works)	Aïn Sefra–Djeniene Bourezg, towards Fort Duveyrier(in the current commune of Beni Ounif)	July 7, 1900

==== Network at the end of the 19th century: A great disparity of lines ====
At the end of the 19th Century, five railway companies operated Algerian railway lines:

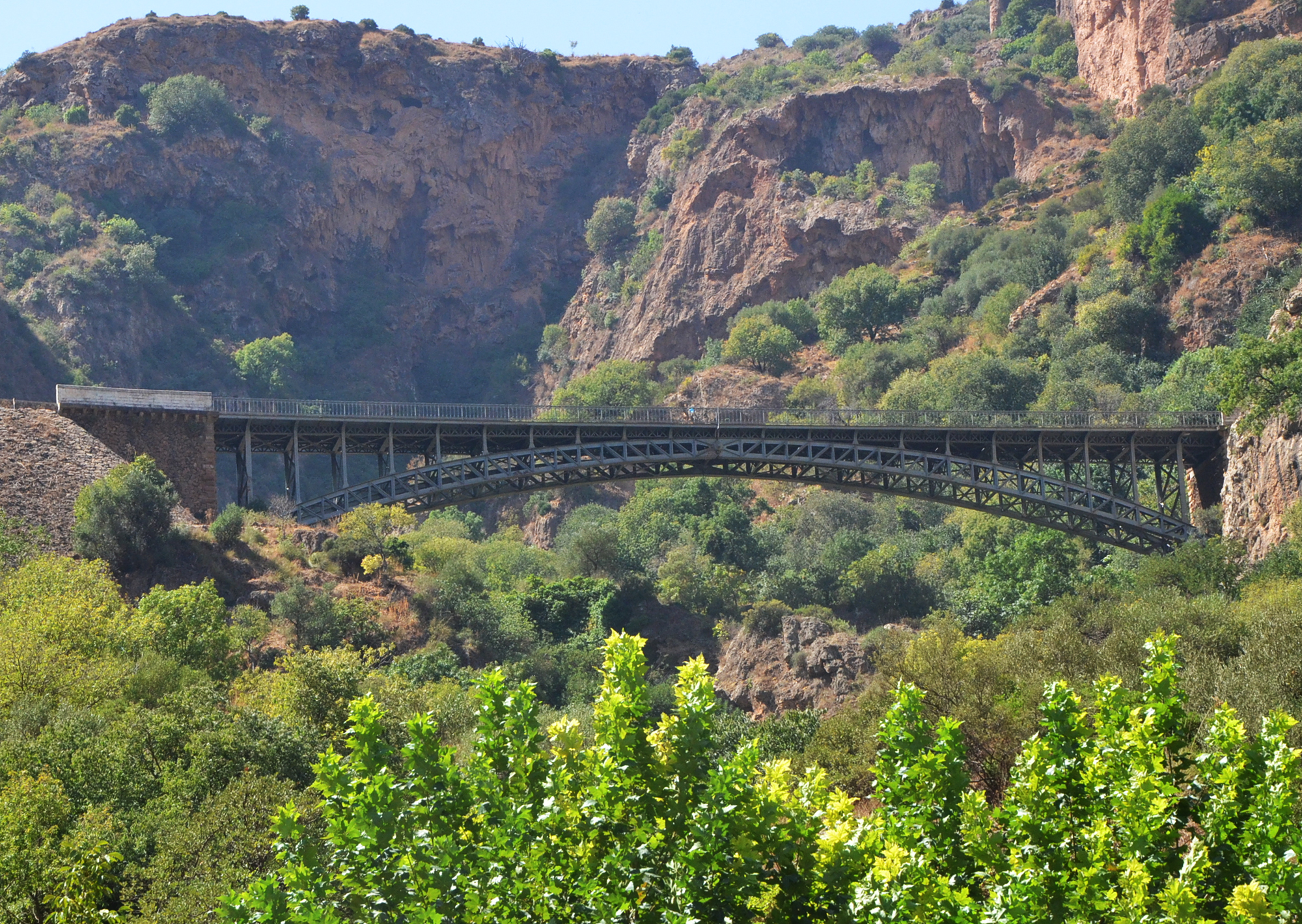
The railway viaduct of El Ourit, on the Tabia to Tlemcen line.

- Compagnie des chemins de fer de Paris à Lyon et à la Méditerranée (PLM), which operated the Algiers to Oran and the Philippeville to Constantine lines;
- Compagnie de l'Est algérien (CEA), which operated the Algiers to Constantine line, the lines east of Algiers towards Tizi Ouzou and Bougie, and those in the Constantine region towards Batna, Biskra, and Aïn Beida;
- Compagnie des chemins de fer Bône-Guelma (CBG), which operated lines in the Bône region towards Duvivier, Guelma, Kroubs, Souk Ahras, Tébessa, and Tunisia;
- Compagnie franco-algérienne (FA), which operated the lines from Mostaganem to Tiaret, from Arzew to Aïn Sefra, and from Aïn Tizi to Mascara;
- Compagnie de l'Ouest algérien (COA), which operated lines in the Oran region towards Sidi Bel Abbès, Ras El Ma, Aïn Témouchent, Tlemcen, and the Blida to Berrouaghia and Boghari line.

It is noteworthy that, for three of the five companies, several lines in their respective networks did not have connections with each other:

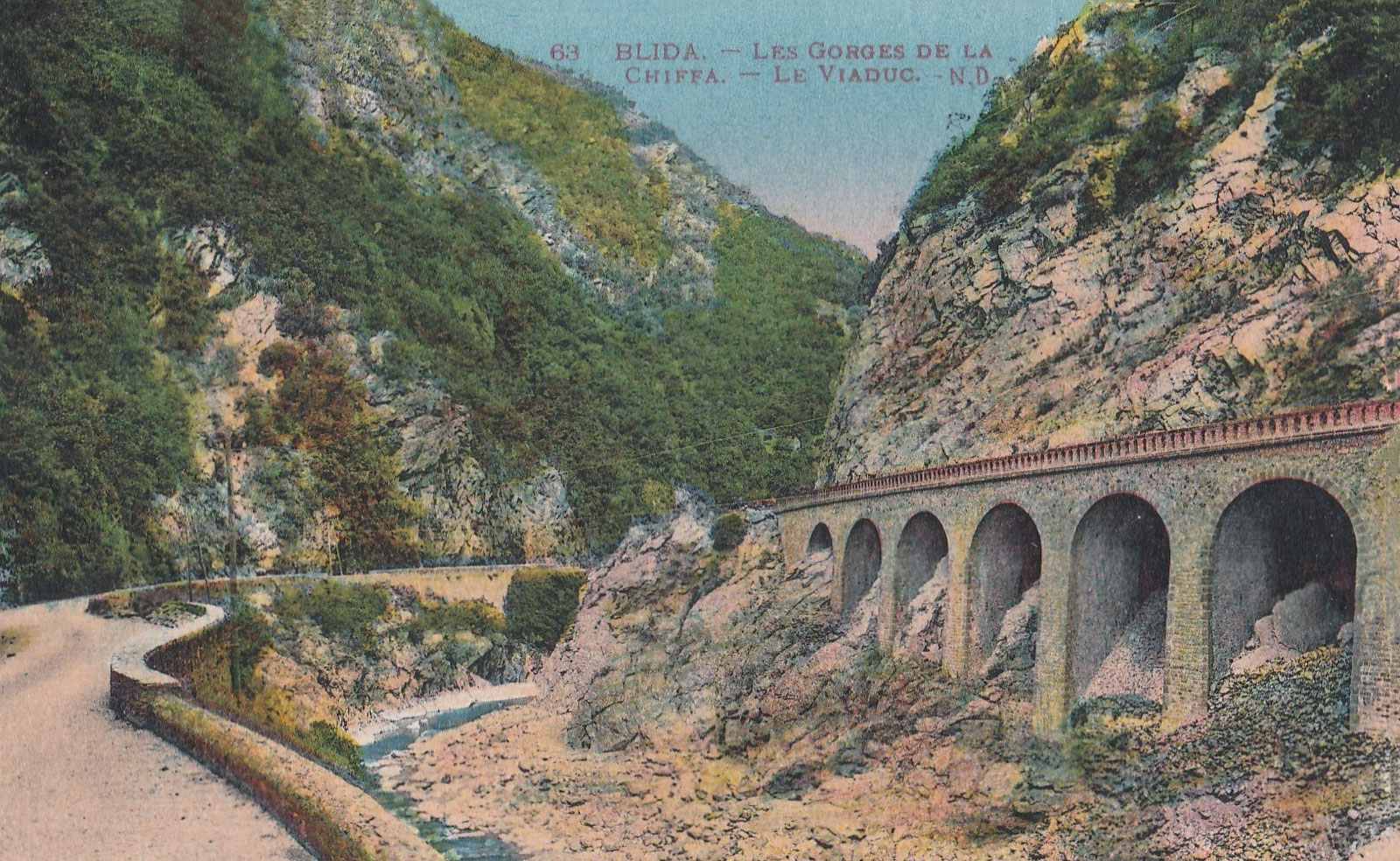
The Blida to Berrouaghia line, with a gauge of 1,055 mm, runs through the Chiffa Gorges.

- The two PLM lines: from Algiers to Oran and from Philippeville to Constantine, were separated by 462 km (287 mi).
- The three COA lines: from La Sénia to Aïn Témouchent, from Sainte-Barbe-du-Tlélat to Tlemcen and Ras El Ma, and from Blida to Berrouaghia, branch off the PLM's Algiers to Oran line without communicating with each other.
- The two FA lines: from Arzew to Aïn Sefra and from Mostaganem to Tiaret, only connected through the Relizane to Mohammadia
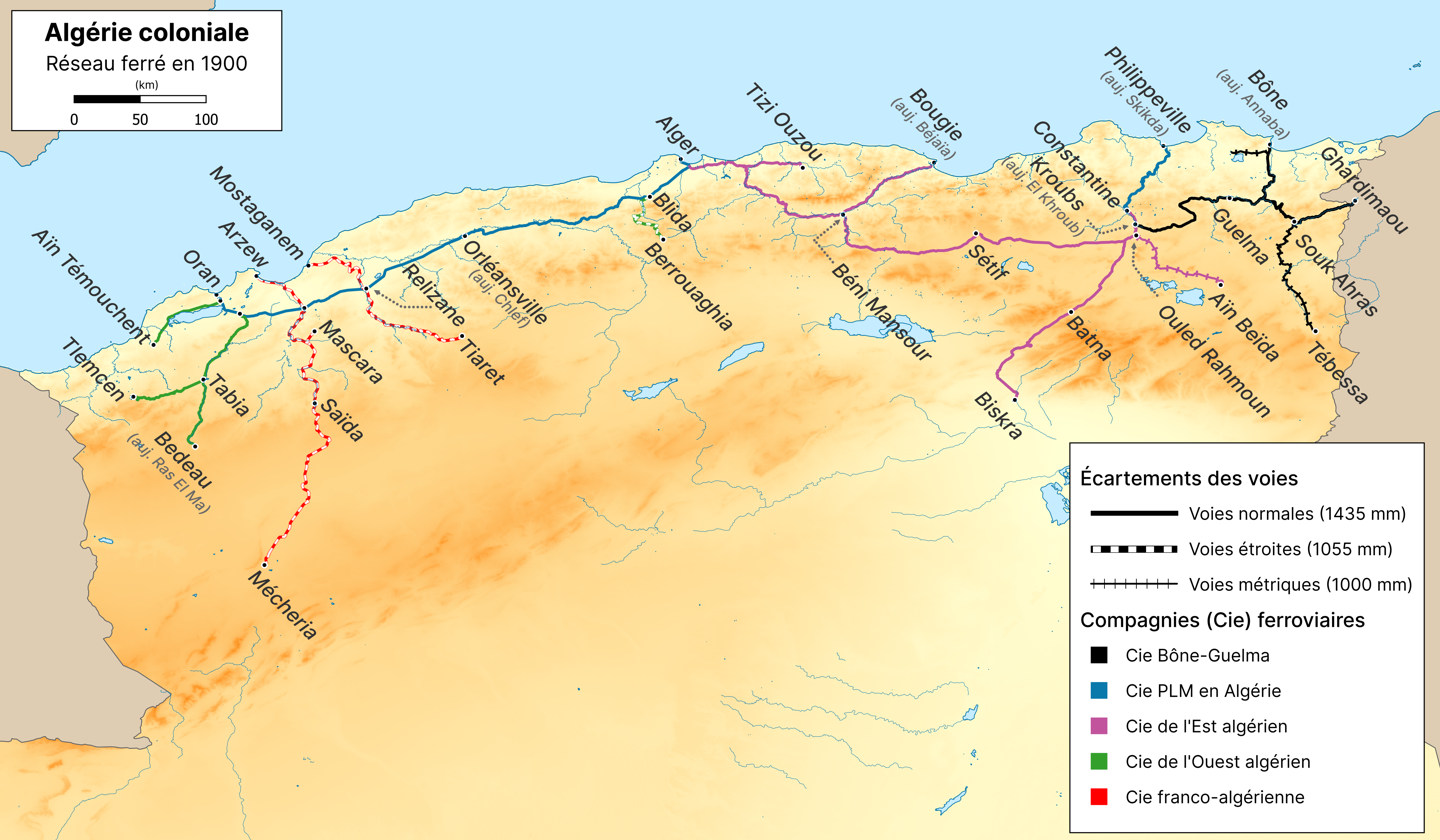
  Algerian railway network in 1900.

=== Evolution and consolidation of the network in the early 20th century ===
==== Toward railway autonomy for Algeria ====
1892 marks the beginning of a pause in the creation of general interest lines in Algeria for about a decade. Only a few small local interest lines are declared of public utility during this period:

- The Oran to Arzew line on April 9, 1898;
- The line from Aïn Beïda to Khenchela on July 30, 1900;
- The tramway from Saint-Paul to Randon on May 11, 1898;
- The lines of the Chemins de fer sur routes d'Algérie company: from El Affroun to Marengo; from the port of Algiers to Saint-Eugène and Rovigo; from Dellys to Boghni, from Algiers to Coléa on January 16, 1892;
- The Aïn Mokra to Saint-Charles line on April 25, 1900;
- The tramway from Bône to La Calle on August 18, 1900.

The French state disengages from direct governance of the construction and financing of the railway network in Algeria and aims to transfer this responsibility to its colony. The laws of December 19, 1900, and July 23, 1904, create a special budget to grant financial autonomy to Algeria, in terms of public works, with a separate budget for the management and development of its railway network. The Colony now has the opportunity to add new railway tracks to the insufficient network provided by the Metropolis. But first, some order must be brought to the operational network before addressing its development, including improving and unifying the tariff structure for passenger services and freight transport.

The governor-general encourages Algerian companies to unify the rates for mainline (GV) and low speed (PV). The Compagnie des chemins de fer Bône-Guelma, and Compagnie de l'Ouest algérien, and PLM undertake studies to achieve a unification of tariffs. Only the Compagnie de l'Est algérien refuses.

==== Acquisitions of companies and network reorganization ====
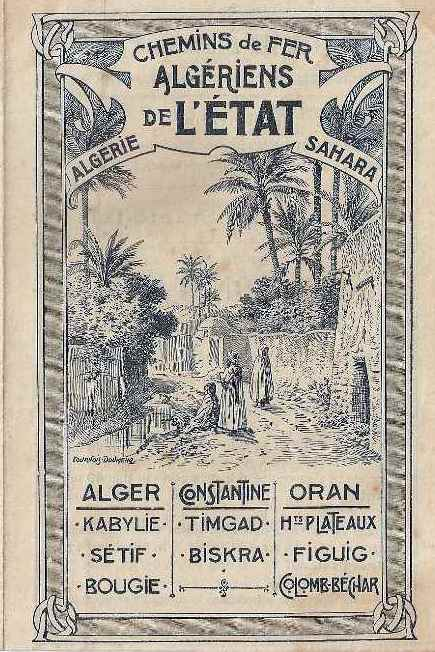
A poster of the Algerian State Railways Company around 1910.

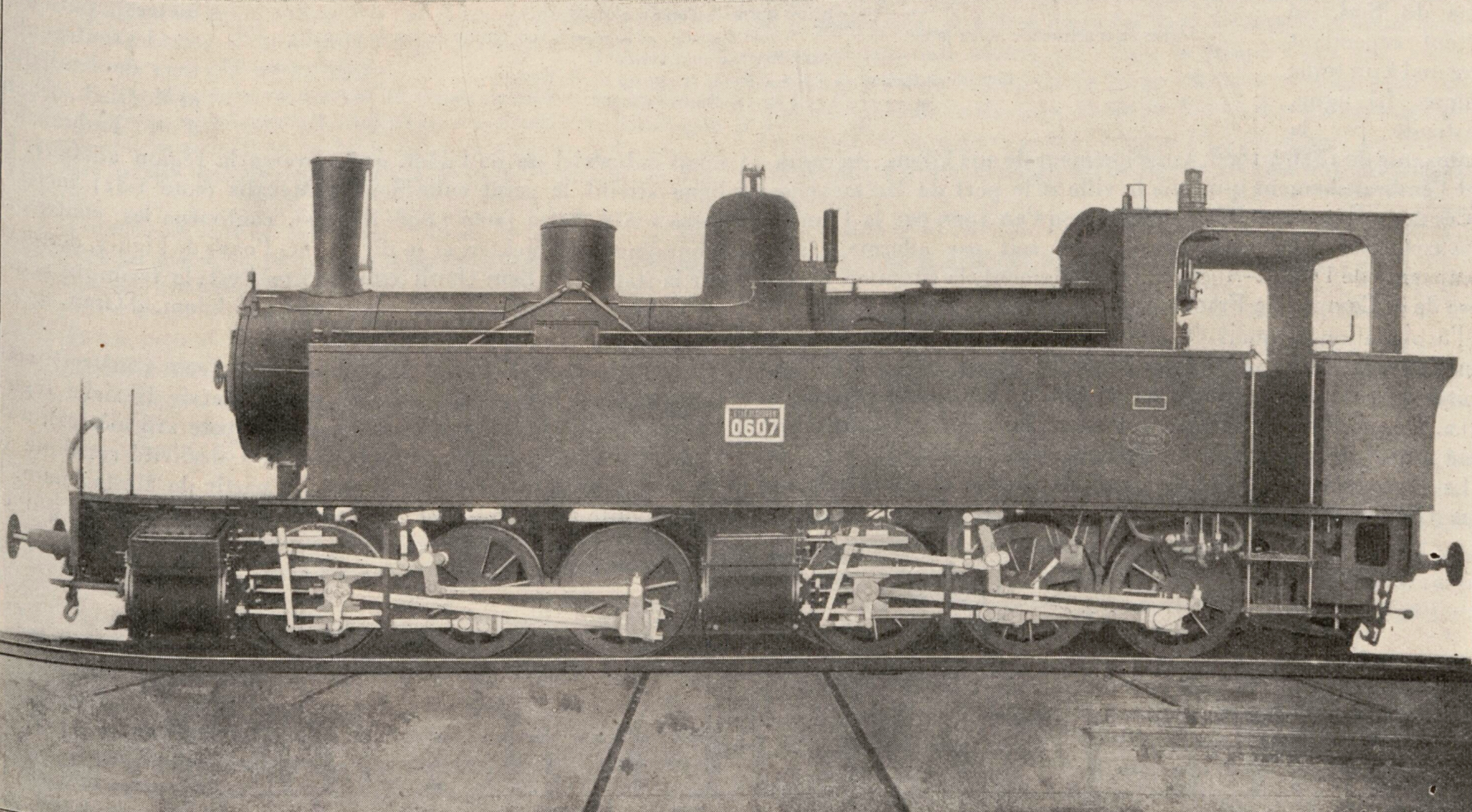
A Mallet tender locomotive from the Oranais State network in 1913.

At the end of the 19th century and during the early years of the 20th century, especially during the First World War, Algerian railway companies faced financial difficulties. These difficulties led to the disappearance of four of them, and the Algerian government bought the lines of their networks, which were transferred either to the new Compagnie des chemins de fer algériens de l'État (CFAE), created on September 27, 1912, to operate the lines acquired by the Algerian government, or to the PLM company.

===== Acquisition of the Compagnie franco-algérienne =====
The Compagnie franco-algérienne, not very prosperous because its lines were not very profitable, faced financial difficulties, leading it to lease its network to the Compagnie de l'Ouest algérien for five years in 1888. It eventually filed for bankruptcy in 1890 but retained its concessions for a few more years. The decree of December 21, 1900, authorized the state to operate the lines of the Compagnie franco-algérienne. The network was bought on December 28, 1900, and placed under the supervision of the Administration métropolitaine des chemins de fer d'État. It was transferred to the Compagnie des chemins de fer algériens de l'État in 1912.

===== Acquisition of the Compagnie de l'Est algérien =====
After the Compagnie de l'Est algérien refused to unify its freight transport rates with those of other companies, citing potential operating losses, the governor-general and the Algerian assemblies decided to buy the company's concessions and operate its network directly. The decree of August 25, 1907, confirmed this purchase, which took effect on May 12, 1908. Like the network of the Compagnie franco-algérienne, the network of the Compagnie de l'Est algérien was definitively transferred to the CFAE in 1912.

===== Acquisition of the Compagnie des chemins de fer Bône-Guelma =====
The Compagnie des chemins de fer Bône-Guelma, which had agreed to unify its freight transport rates, wanted to renegotiate its agreements to better incorporate its costs for transporting mining products from southern Constantine. As the negotiations failed, the Algerian government considered buying the Algerian part of the Compagnie des chemins de fer Bône-Guelma's network (which also operated lines in Tunisia). This acquisition was authorized by the decree of June 9, 1914, and it was completed on January 1, 1915.

===== Acquisition of the Compagnie de l'Ouest algérien =====
World War I had repercussions on the Algerian railway network. From the beginning of the war, the railways came under the control of the French army. Requisitions and military priorities paralyzed the commercial railway transport of Algerian companies. The reduction in personnel and the exorbitant increase in the costs of raw materials, including coal, due to the war, further worsened the situation. These difficulties greatly deteriorated the financial situation of the companies, especially the Company of Western Algeria. Faced with increased expenses caused by the war and a decrease in profits, the company requested renegotiations of the financial clauses of its concessions. It declared its inability to continue operating its network beyond December 31, 1920. The Algerian authorities then decided to proceed with the repurchase of the company's network. This repurchase was formalized by the decree of December 31, 1920. The operation of the network was temporarily transferred to the PLM company on July 1, 1921, and then permanently in 1924.

==== Acquisition of the Paris–Lyon–Mediterranean Railway Company in Algeria ====
The previous acquisitions have led to improvements in the management and organization of the network but have not succeeded in homogenizing it. The lines of the PLM Company remained intertwined with those of the CFAE. Additionally, the PLM Company needed to revise its 1863 agreement with the State to account for the economic conditions in the aftermath of the war. A reform of the organization of Algeria's general interest railways became necessary.

A new agreement was established on July 1, 1921, between the governor-general of Algeria on one hand, and the administration of the Algerian State Railways and the PLM Company on the other. This agreement stipulates that:

– The Governor-General acquires from the Paris-Lyon-Mediterranean Company, starting from January 1, 1922, all the lines conceded to it by the Convention of May 1, 1863, namely: the line from Algiers to Oran and the line from Philippeville to Constantine. – The Governor-General, representing Algeria, leases to the PLM Company from January 1, 1922, the following lines: from Algiers to Oran, from La Sénia to Aïn-Témouchent, from Sainte-Barbe-du-Tlélat to Sidi-Bel-Abbès and Ras-el-Mâ, from Tabia to Tlemcen and the border of Morocco, and from Blida to Djelfa.

The agreement is approved by the law of December 11, 1922.

Thus, in 1922, only two railway companies remained in Algeria: the Algerian State Railways Company (CFAE) and the Paris-Lyon-Mediterranean Company in Algeria (PLMA).

==== Network Expansion ====
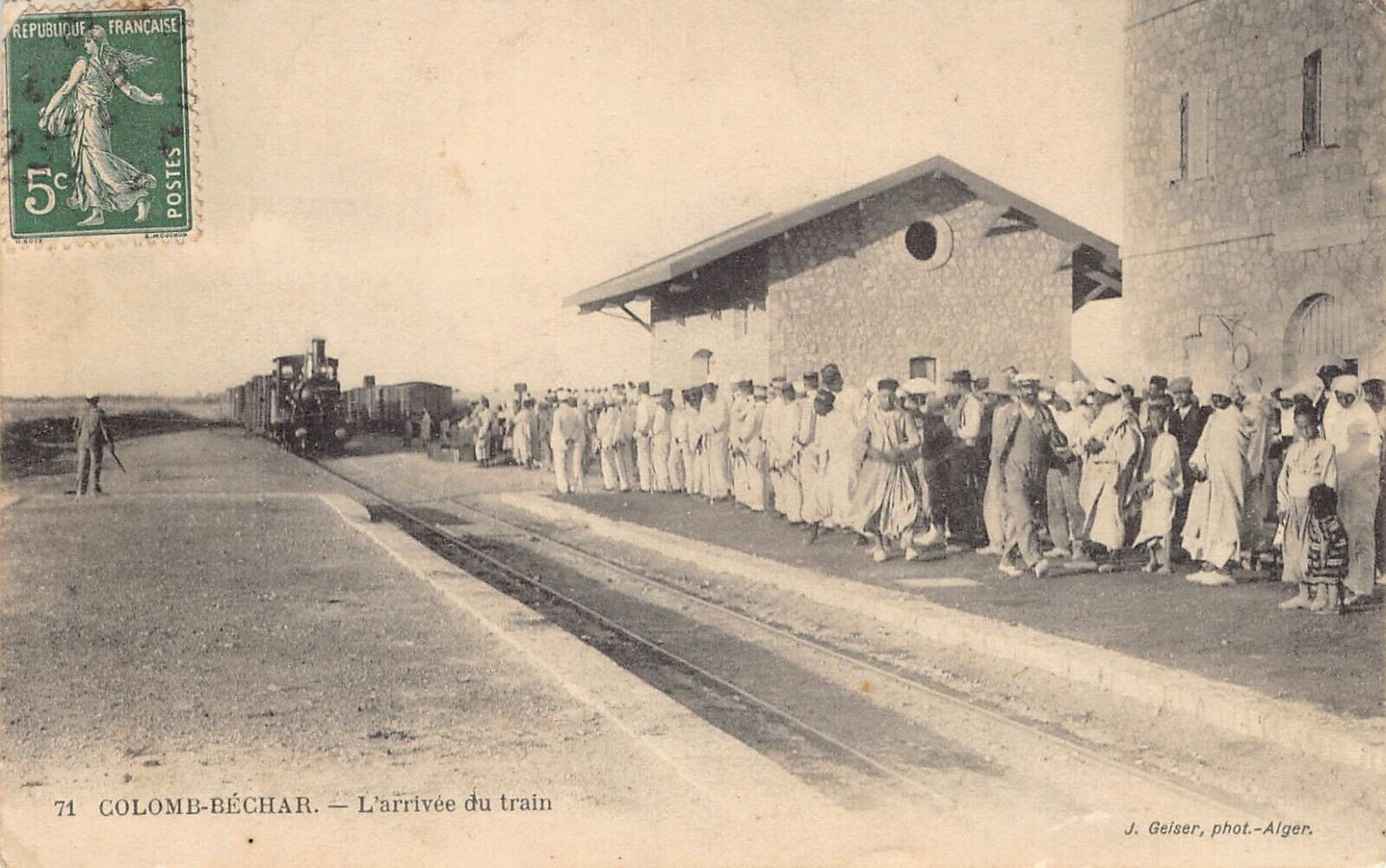
Colomb-Béchar Station.

The expansion of the network resumed at the beginning of the 20th century with:

- The extension of the Aïn Sefra to Djeniene Bourezg and Duveyrier line towards Igli, by the law of February 25, 1901;
- The construction of the Tlemcen to Lalla Marnia line and to the border of Morocco, by the law of December 29, 1903;

Several declarations of public utility are made for the following lines:

- From Béni Saf to Tlemcen, law of July 16, 1908;
- From Berrouaghia to Djelfa via Boghari, law of February 26, 1910;
- From Tizi to Uzès-le-Duc, law of March 8, 1910;
- From Sidi Bel Abbès to Tizi, law of March 8, 1910;
- From Relizane to Prévost-Paradol via Montgolfier, law of March 22, 1910;
- From Aïn Béïda to Tébessa, law of April 1, 1910;
- From Ténès to Orléansville, law of April 1, 1910;
- From Biskra to Touggourt, law of April 4, 1910;
- From Bizot to Djidjelli with a branch to Mila (city), law of March 18, 1912;
- From Constantine to Oued Athmania, law of March 18, 1912;
- From Oumache to Tolga, law of March 9, 1915.
- From Colomb-Béchar to Kenadsa, law of December 24, 1924;
- From Tébessa to the Tunisian border, law of December 24, 1924.
Selection of views of stations on the Blida to Djelfa line

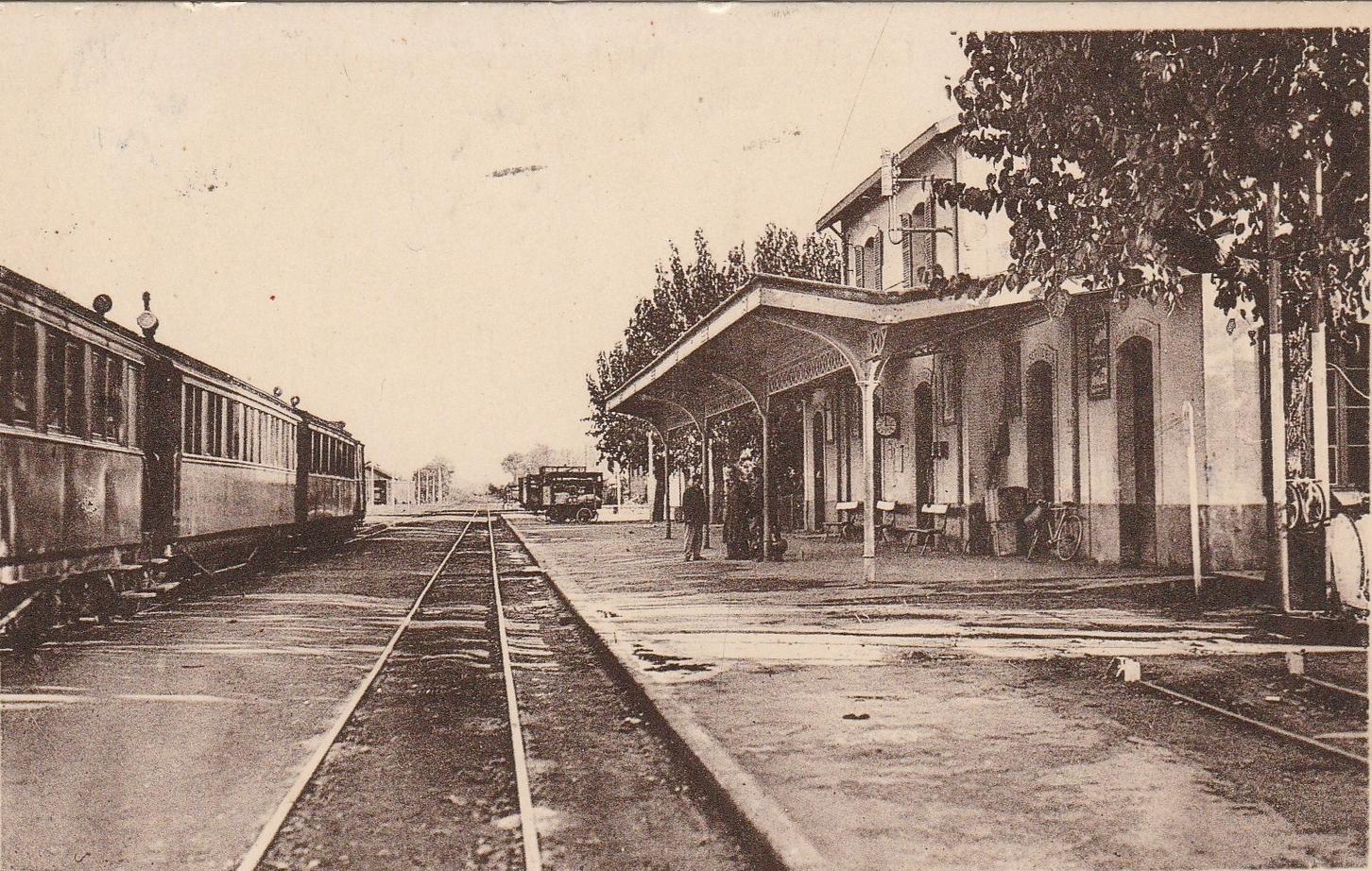
Médéa Station.

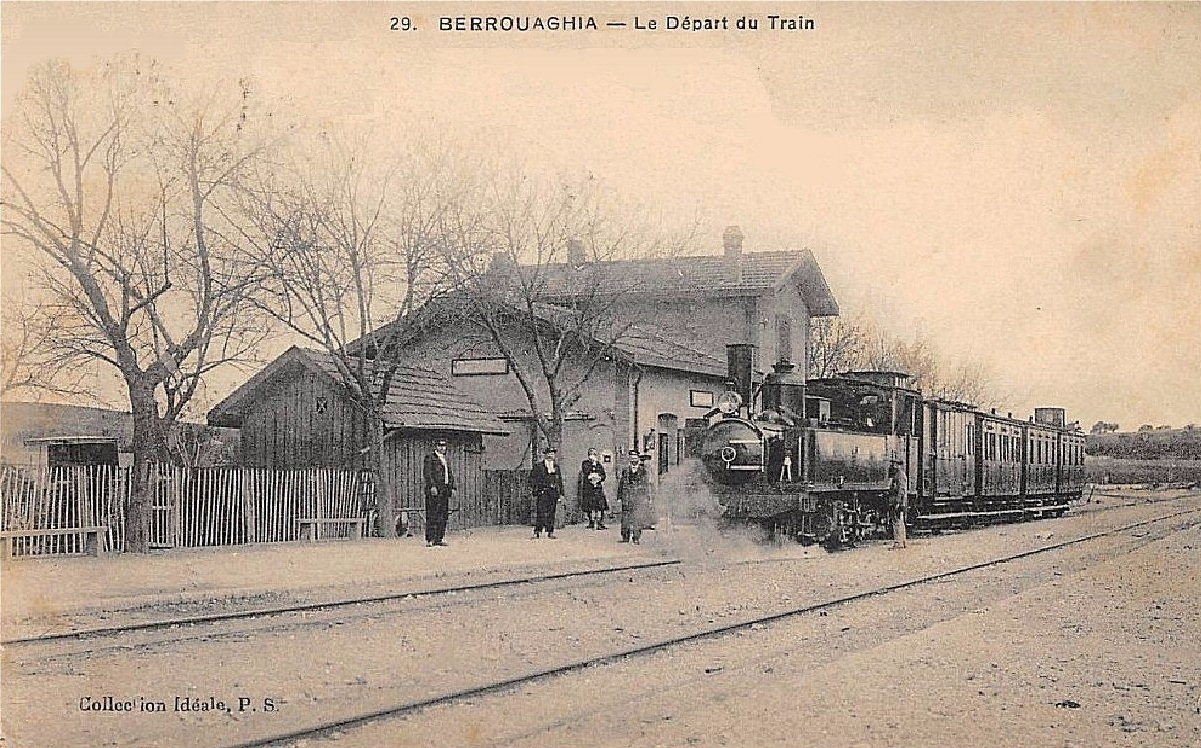
Berrouaghia Station.

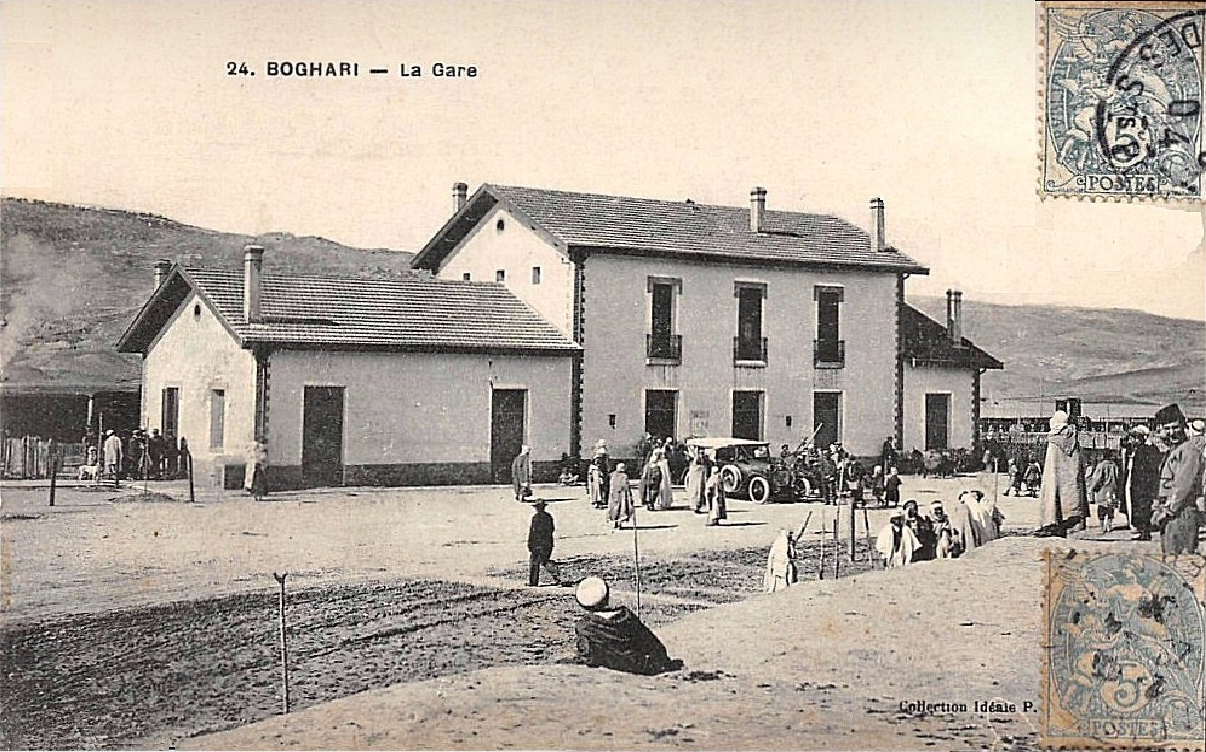
Boghari Station.

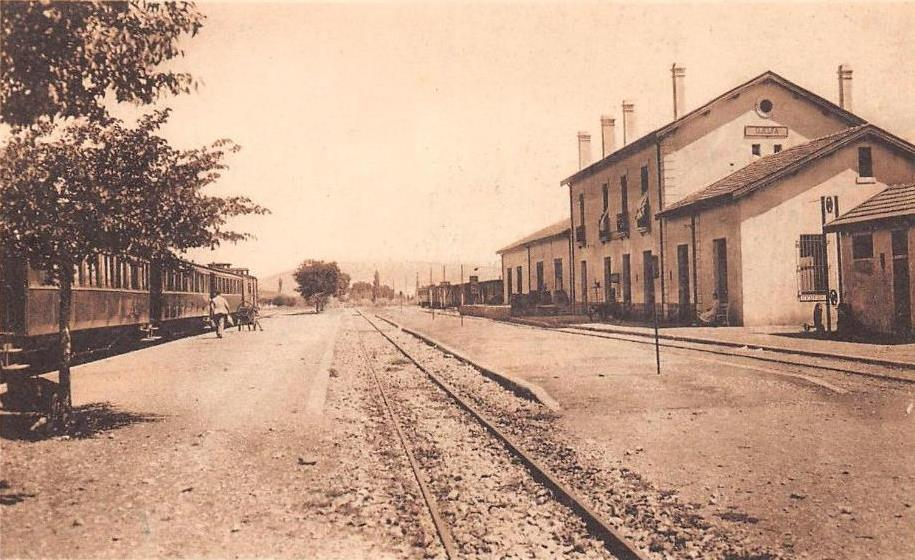
Djelfa Station.

Other laws reorganize the Algerian network:

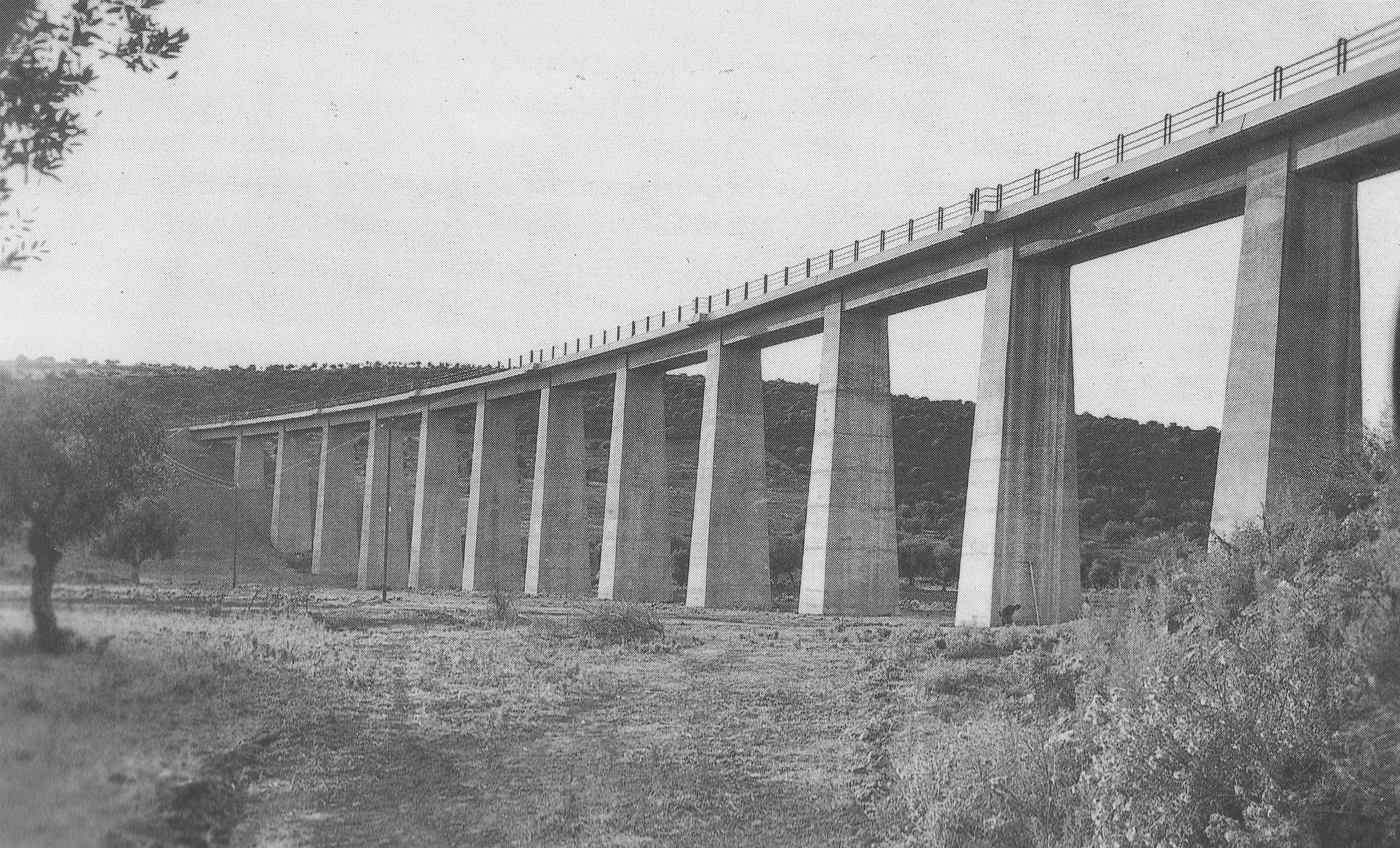
The viaduct over the oued Deb on the Bône to Saint-Charles line.

- Transformation to standard gauge of the narrow-gauge line from Souk-Ahras to Tébessa, law of August 13, 1915;
- Incorporation into the general network of Algeria of the Biskra to Touggourt railway line and the branch line from Oumache to Tolga, law of March 21, 1922;
- Incorporation into the state's public domain of the local interest railways from Bône to La Calle, from Aïn-Mokra to Saint-Charles, and from Saint-Paul to Randon, law of March 21, 1929;
- Purchase of the secondary general interest line from Bône to Aïn-Mokra, law of March 3, 1928;
- Incorporation into the state's public domain of the local interest railway from Tiaret to Trumelet, law of March 3, 1928;
- Incorporation into the state's public domain of the lines operated by the Chemins de fer sur routes d'Algérie (CFRA) company, law of March 3, 1928;
- Distribution of the steam network lines operated by CFRA between the two general interest networks (PLM and State); gubernatorial decree of March 22, 1928.

In 1930 the Algerian network has approximately 5000 km of railway tracks, distributed as shown in the following table.

Distribution of railway tracks on the Algerian network in 1930.
Companies	Standard Gauge 1435 mm	Narrow Gauge 1055 mm	Narrow Gauge 1000 mm	Narrow Gauge 600 mm	Total companies
CFAE	1,271 km (790 mi)	1,482 km (921 mi)	781 km (485 mi)	55 km (34 mi)	3589 km 1,271 km (790 mi)
PLMA	781 km (485 mi)	452 km (281 mi)			1233 km 1,271 km (790 mi)
Total network	2,053 km (1,276 mi)	1,934 km (1,202 mi)	781 km (485 mi)	55 km (34 mi)	4,823 km (2,997 mi)

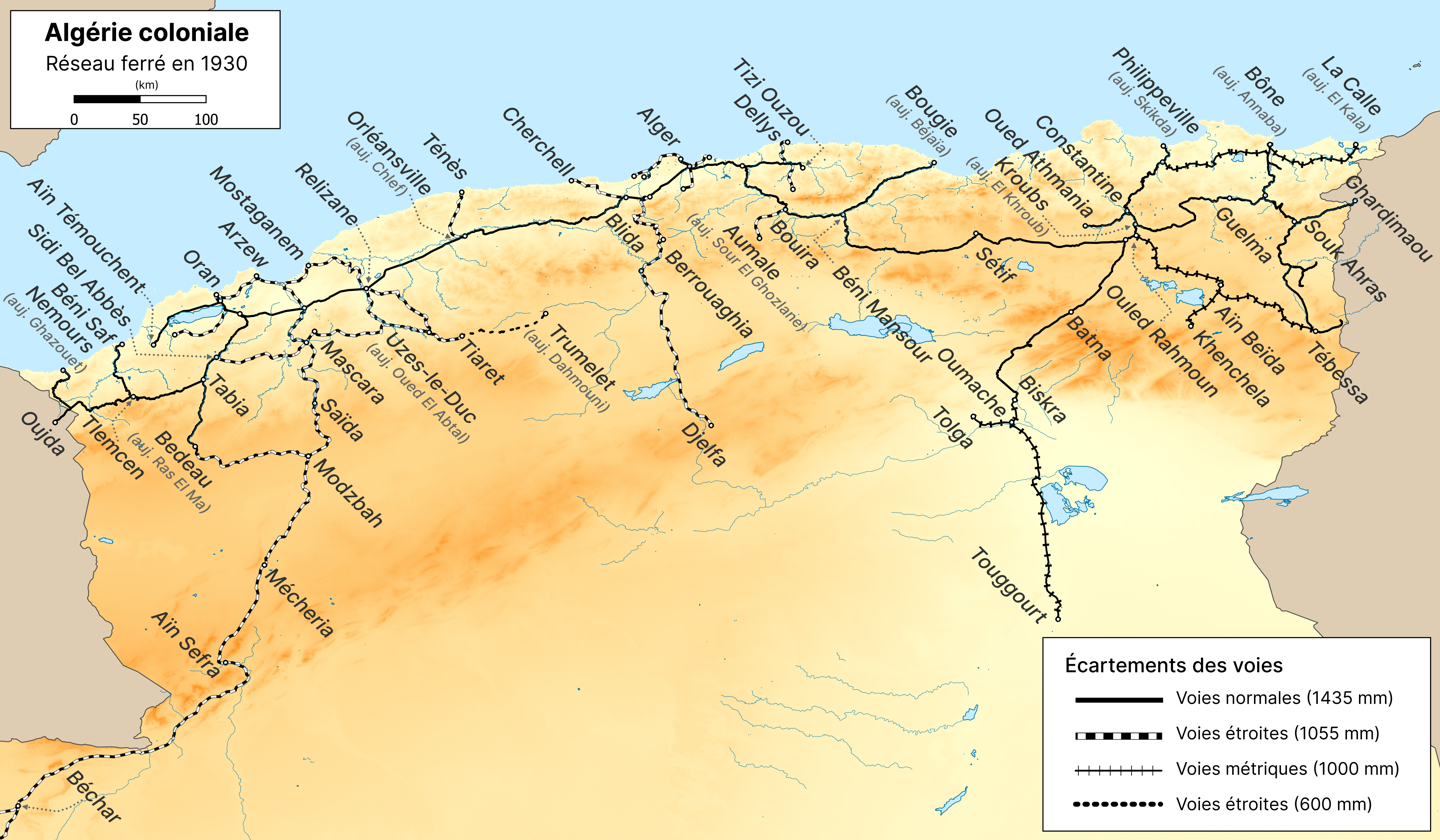
Algerian railway network in 1930.

==== Electrification of the mining line ====
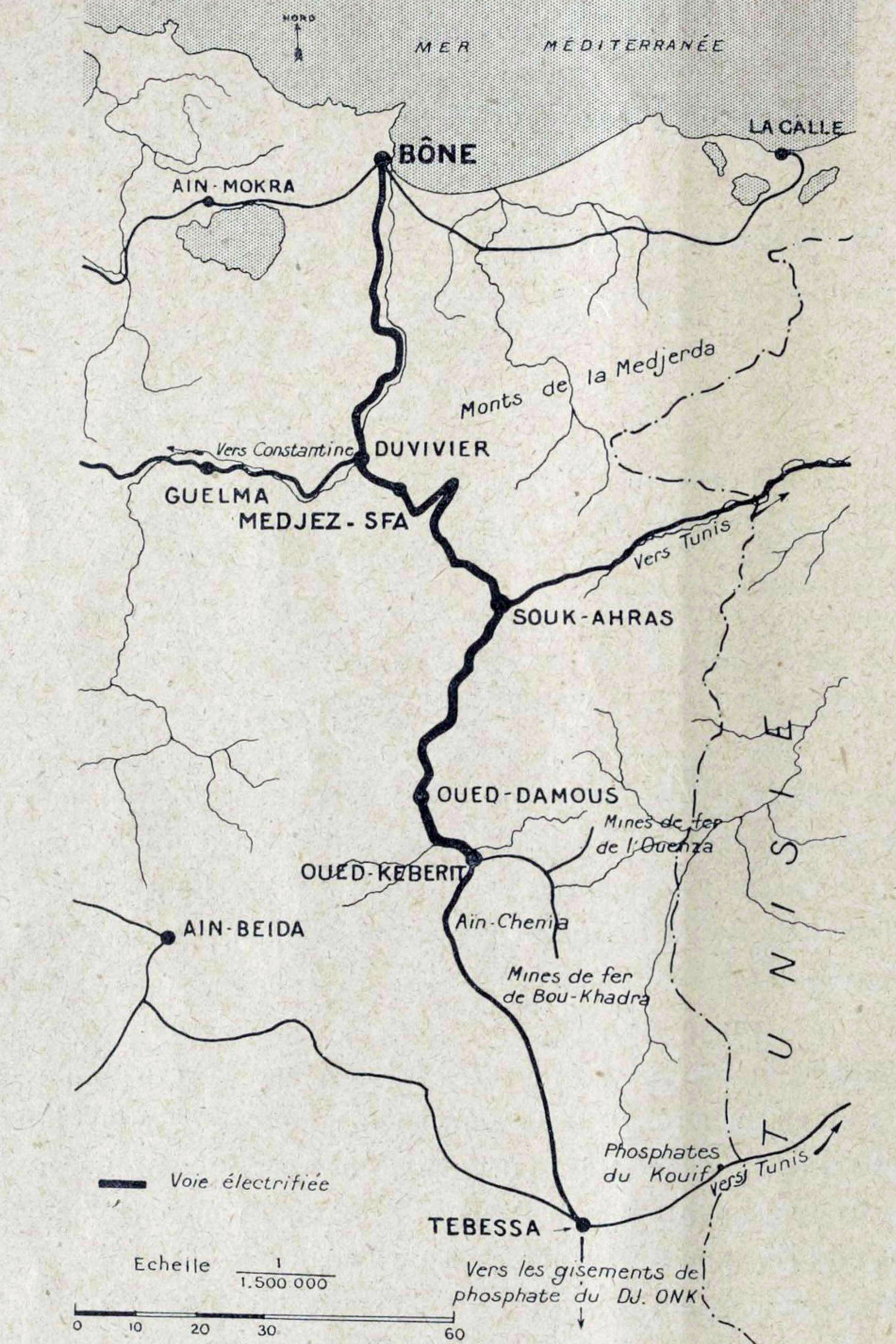
Route of the Bône to Tébessa line in 1933.

The Souk Ahras to Tébessa line, granted to the Compagnie des chemins de fer Bône-Guelma in 1885, originally aimed to connect two important cities in eastern Algeria and ensure a connection with Tunisia, where the company also had concessions. It also had a strategic military interest due to its proximity to the border. Its construction was completed in 1888. Originally, it was a meter-gauge line given the expected limited commercial role.

The discovery in the 1890s of phosphate deposits in the Djebel Kouif (east of Tébessa, 257 km south of Bône) and iron ore in the Ouenza massif (located east of Oued Keberit at 190 km from Bône) at the same time led their operators to build short lines to connect these mining sites to the Souk Ahras to Tébessa line. These branches allowed the transportation of ores by rail to the port of Bône for export.

During the 1920s, the tonnage of ores transported by railways increased from 350,000 t (340,000 long tons; 390,000 short tons) in 1921 to nearly 2 million tons in 1930. The Bône to Tébessa line now played a crucial role in ore transportation. However, the operation of steam locomotives on a single track with a mountainous profile, including steep grades in the Souk Ahras region, became increasingly challenging and no longer allowed efficient transportation. The section of the line between Duvivier and Oued Keberit became a bottleneck limiting its capacity. Only the electrification of the line allowed an increase in capacity and tonnage through improved traction power of electric locomotives and increased speed. The decision to electrify the line was made in 1929, initially for the Duvivier–Oued Keberit section and later for the rest of the line in subsequent years. The voltage of the current chosen was 3 000 V DC, supplied by a thermal power plant of 43,000 kW (58,000 hp) located near Bône. The Algerian State Railways Company acquired around thirty locomotives of the CC 6-AE type (similar to PLM 1CC1 3700) built by Constructions électriques de France (CEF) in association with Alsthom.

The 6-AE electric locomotives remained in service until 1972, and the Bône–Tébessa line remained the only electrified line in Algeria until the 2000s when the suburban network of Algiers was electrified.
Selection of views of 6-AE electric locomotives on the Bône to Tébessa line.

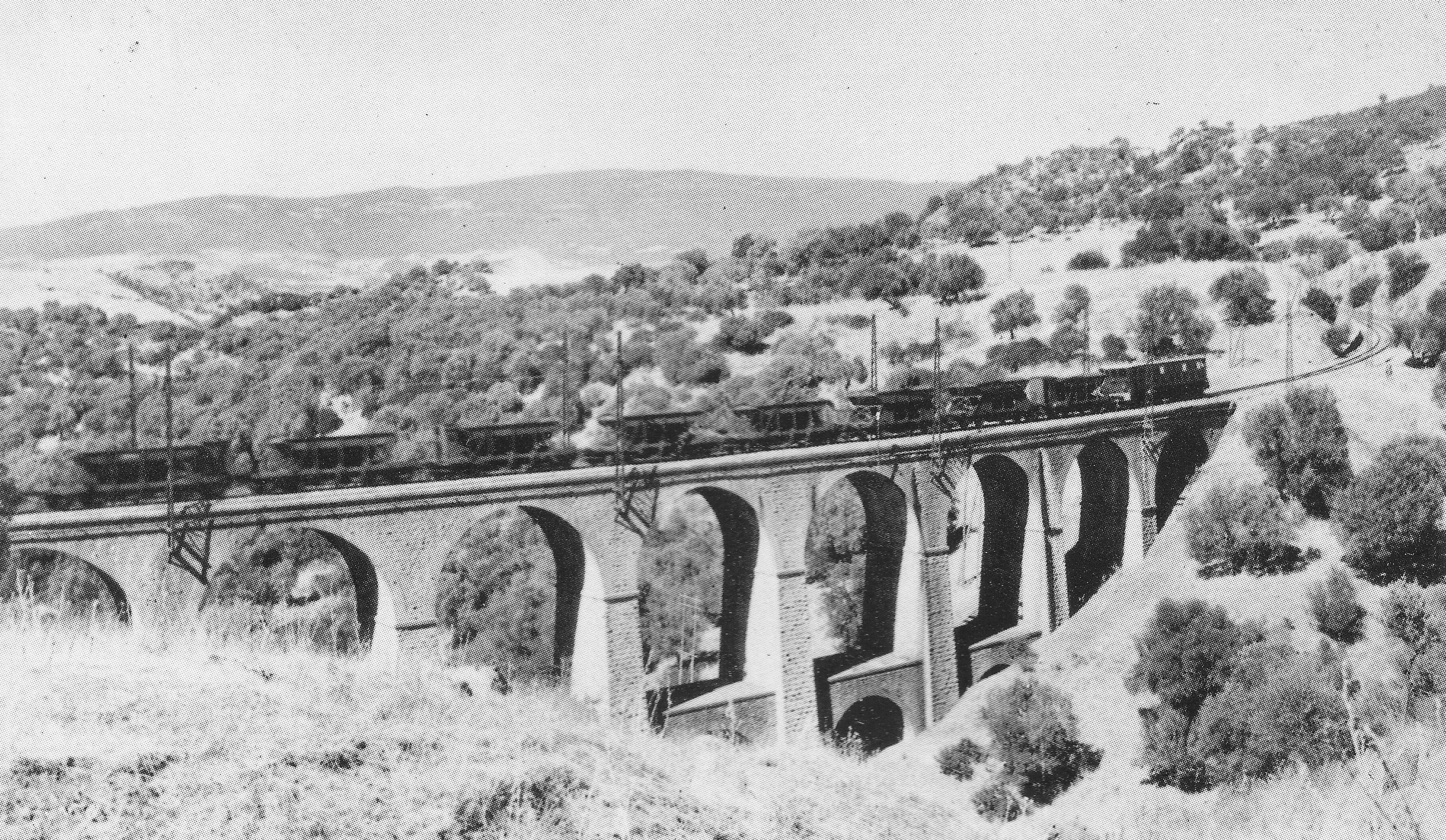
A CFAE 6AE locomotive hauling an ore train on the Souk-Ahras to Oued Keberit line.

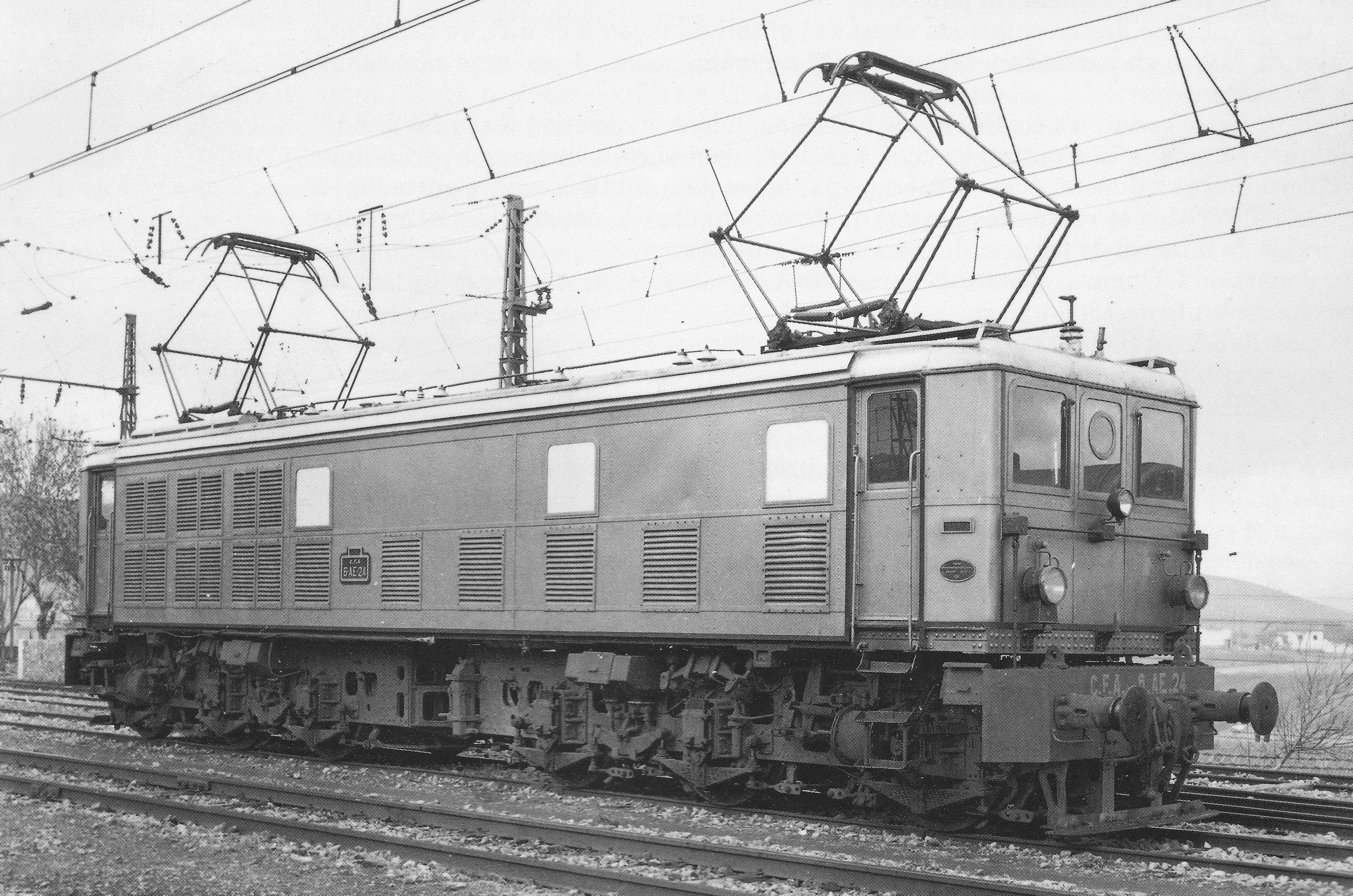
A CFA 6AE-24 locomotive on the Bône to Souk Ahras line.

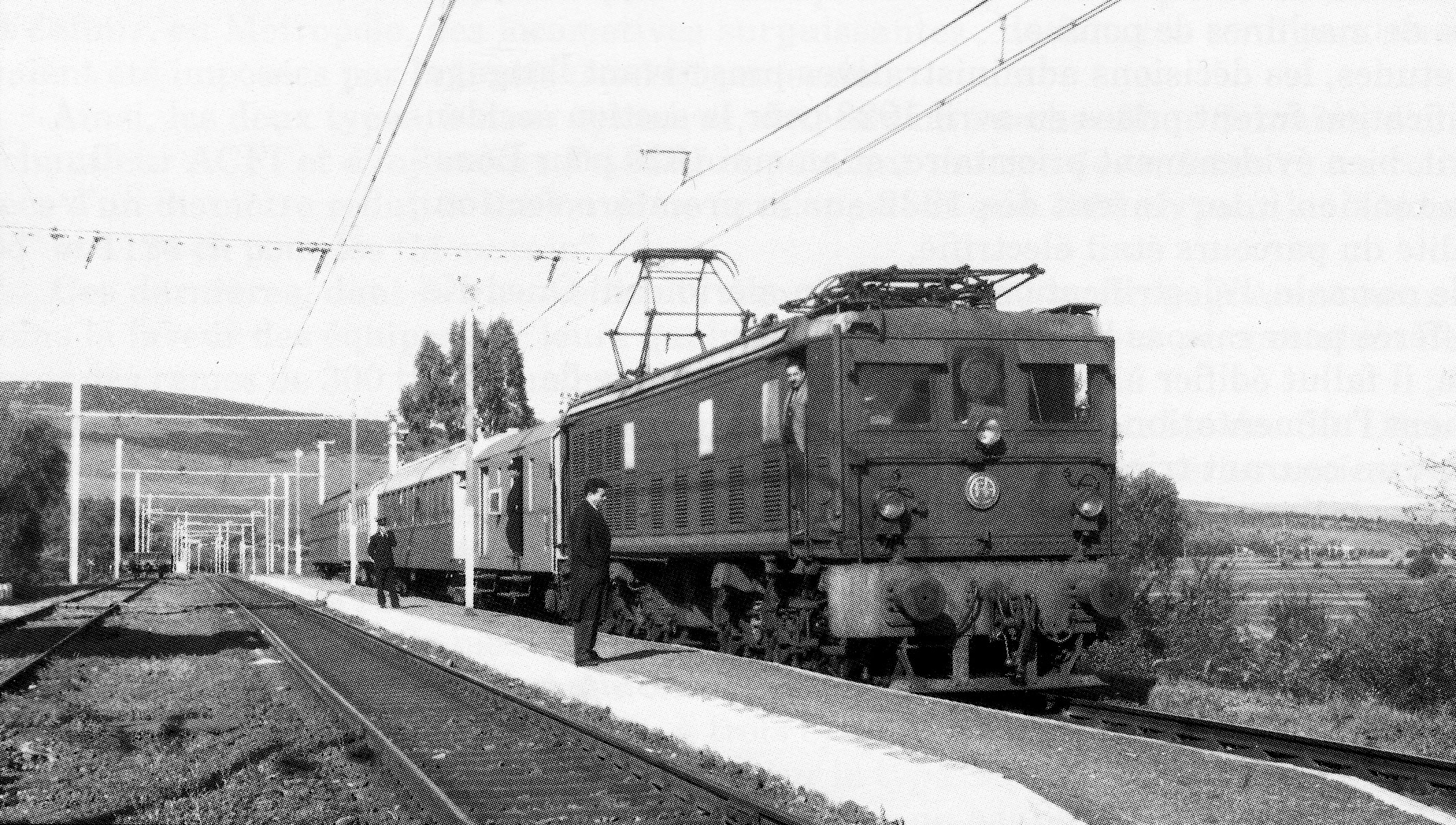
An SNCFA 6-AE locomotive pulling passenger trains at a station on the Bône to Souk Ahras line in 1968.

==== Establishment of the Algerian Railways Office ====
The foundation of the SNCF in 1938 notably led to the disappearance of the Paris-Lyon-Mediterranean Railway Company (PLM) and its Algerian subsidiary, the PLMA. In Algeria, there was initially consideration of integrating the entire network into the new SNCF. However, it was ultimately decided to establish a separate entity from the SNCF: the Office des chemins de fer algériens (CFA), which officially began operating the railway network in Algeria on January 1, 1939.

=== From World War II to independence ===
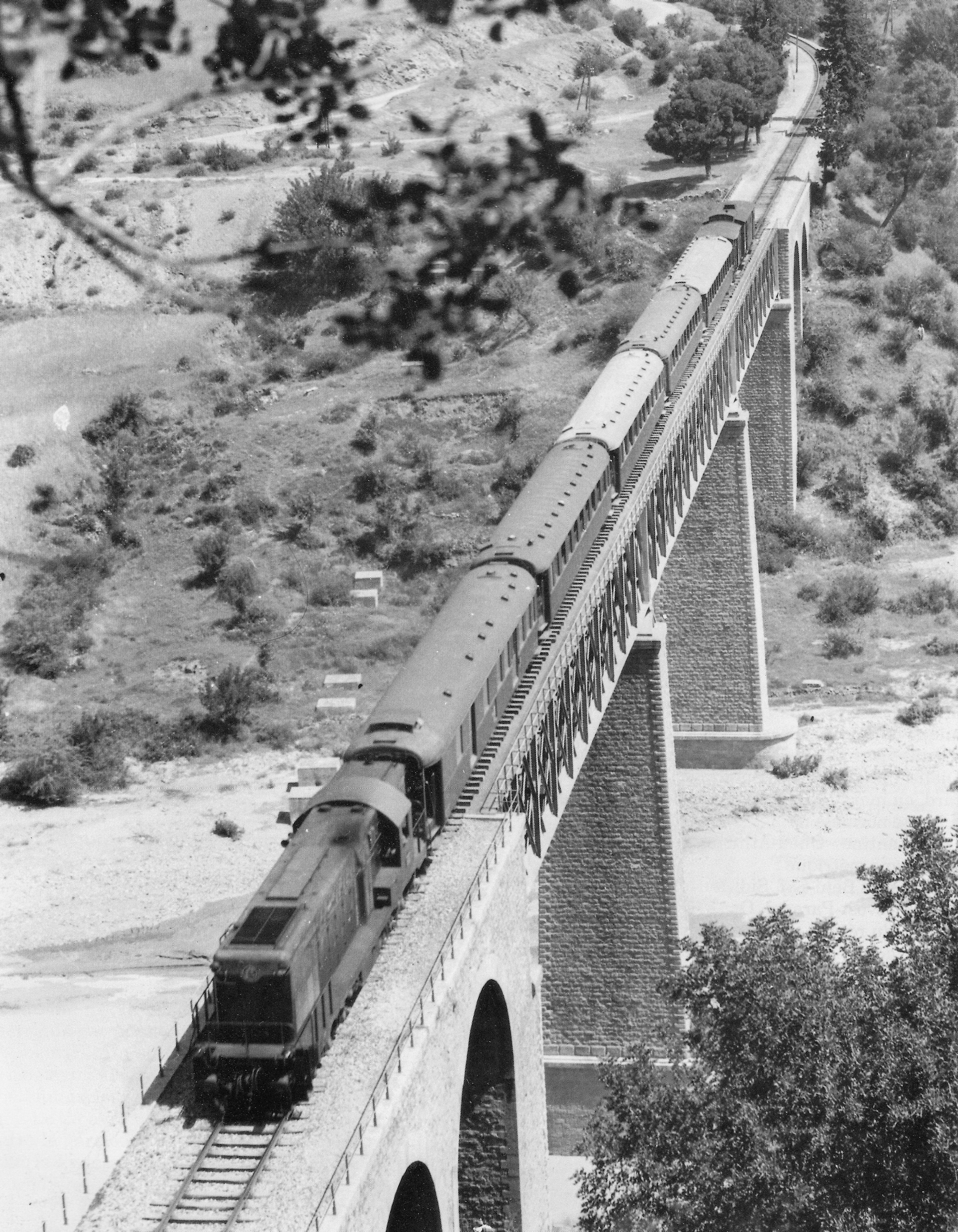
A Baldwin diesel 040-DB locomotive pulling a passenger train on a viaduct of the Algiers to Constantine line, after World War II.

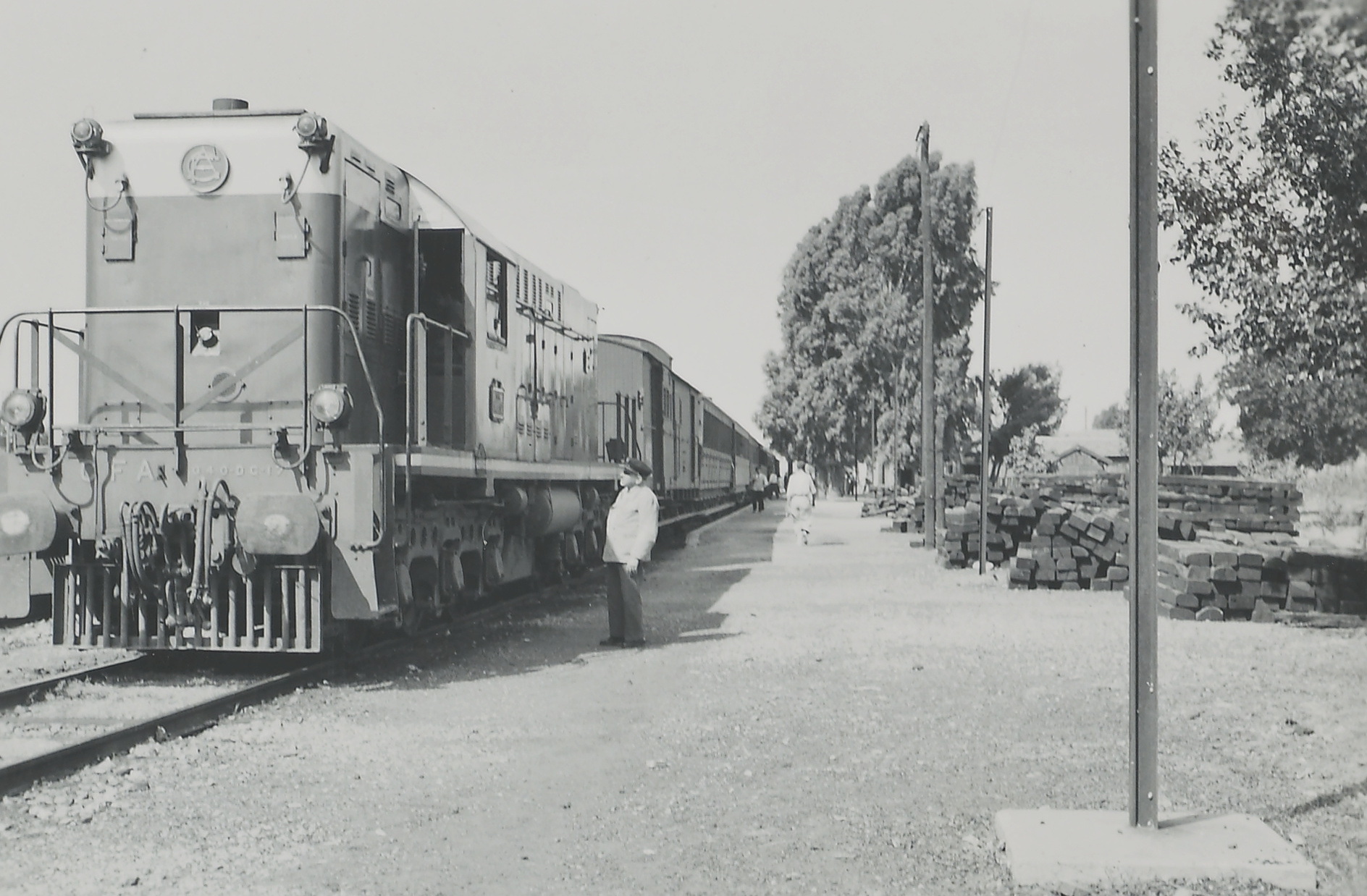
A CFA Passenger train with Baldwin 040-DC locomotive in Ghardimaou, the station at the border between Algeria and Tunisia

Rail transport in Algeria, like in metropolitan France during the same period, faced competition from road transport, both for passengers and goods. Buses and trucks were more competitive and flexible for short or medium distances compared to trains. This situation, which emerged before World War II, continued until the early 1950s. It led to the closure of less important lines and the abandonment of those planned in previous plans.

The first of 40 diesel locomotives built by Baldwin-Lima-Hamilton (BLH) entered service in 1947. The road switchers had the axle arrangement (A1A)(A1A) and were designated 040 DA. A second series of 25 locomotives 040 DB followed in the same year. Compared with the 040 DA, they had a modified gear ratio for passenger trains, allowing them to reach a speed of 130 km/h instead of 96 km/h. In 1948, a third series 040 DC was delivered, which had a six-cylinder prime mover instead of an eight-cylinder engine like the other two classes. Power was reduced from 1,500 hp to 1,014 hp and the top speed was 85 km/h. Steam locomotive operation was discontinued in 1955 on the standard gauge network and six years later on the narrow gauge network.

Over the two decades preceding the independence of Algeria, the Algerian railway network did not undergo major changes except for some transformations of existing lines.

==== Line closures ====
Several small lines in Oran were closed:

- The lines from Sidi Bel-Abbès to Tizi and from Mascara to Uzès-le-Duc.
- The lines from Relizane to Uzès-le-Duc and from Uzès-Ie-Duc to Prévost-Paradol.
- The Burdeau to Hardy line, which remained with a gauge of 600 mm (24 in).
- The Oran to Damesme line.
- The Mostaganem to Relizane line.
- The Modzbah to Marhoun line.
- The Tlemcen to Beni-Saf line.
- The Oran to Hammam Bou Hadjar line.

The same fate befell lines in the central and eastern regions:

- The lines from Orléansville to Ténès, from Bouira to Aumale, and from Dellys to Boghni.
- The suburban lines of Algiers (former CFRA lines).
- The Constantine to Oued-Athménia line and the Bône to La Calle line.

Also, branch lines from the Biskra to Touggourt line:

- From Oumache to Tolga in 1953.
- From Still to El Oued in 1957.

==== Transformations and extensions of existing lines ====
The main transformations involved converting narrow-gauge lines to standard gauge:

- The meter-gauge line from Oued Keberit to Tébessa and Kouif was converted to standard gauge.
- The meter-gauge line from Biskra to Touggourt was converted to standard gauge in 1958.
- The narrow-gauge lines with an 1,055 mm (41.5 in) gauge from Arzew to Mostaganem and from La Macta to Perrégaux were converted to standard gauge.

In 1942 the Trumelet to Burdeau section of the Trumelet to Hardy line, with a 600 mm (24 in) gauge, was converted to narrow gauge with a 1,055 mm (41.5 in) gauge.

In 1946 a 145 km (90 mi) branch line with a 600 mm (24 in) gauge was created on the Biskra to Touggourt line between Still and El Oued. The line was converted to a meter gauge in 1950 and closed in 1958.

==== Establishment of the National Company of French Railways in Algeria ====
On January 1, 1960, the Société nationale des chemins de fer français en Algérie (SNCFA) was created, with the French state and the metropolitan SNCF as its two shareholders.

== Independent Algeria period ==
=== From Independence to the end of the 20th century ===
==== The network in the first decade after independence ====
Logo of SNCFA.

On January 16, 1963, the French National Railway Company in Algeria, created in 1959, became the Société nationale des chemins de fer algériens (retaining the same acronym SNCFA).

After independence the new SNCFA inherited a fairly dense, heterogeneous, and partly obsolete network. It also needed to "Algerianize" its workforce to hastily replace French-born railway workers, mainly executives, who had left Algeria. In 1963, the full Algerian operation of the network took place thanks to a few engineers and supervisors who met this challenge. However, that year, passenger and freight traffic represented only 68% and 51% respectively compared to 1960.

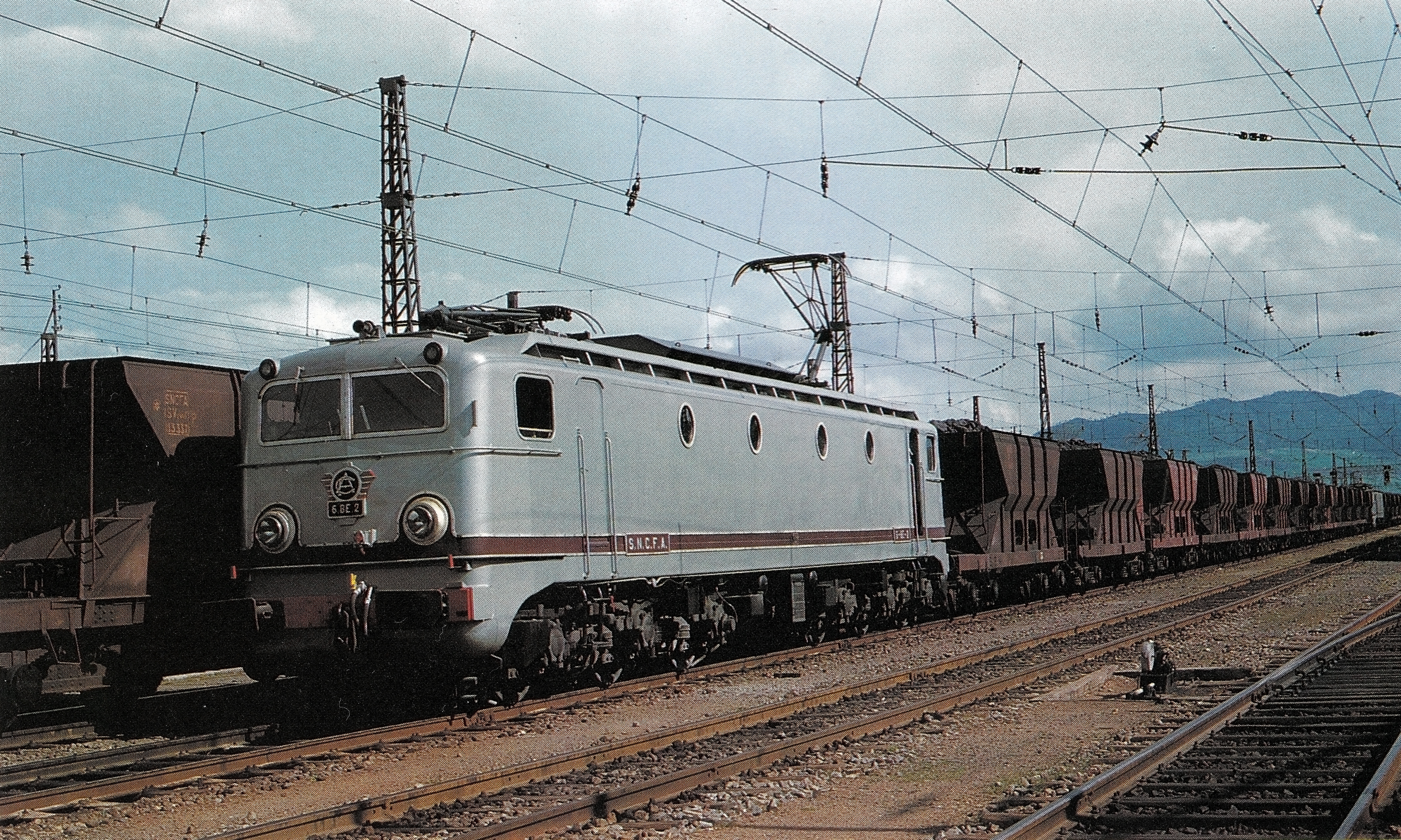
An ore train, pulled by a SNCFA Alsthom 6-BE-2 locomotive, at Oued Keberit station in 1967.

For an entire decade, from 1962 to 1972, the SNCFA focused on maintaining its lines and equipment. During this period, narrow-gauge lines were closed either for economic reasons or due to difficulties in maintenance or renewal of rolling stock. The notable exception was the extension of the Annaba-Tébessa line in 1966, covering a length of 110 km (68 mi) to the Djebel Onk phosphate mine.

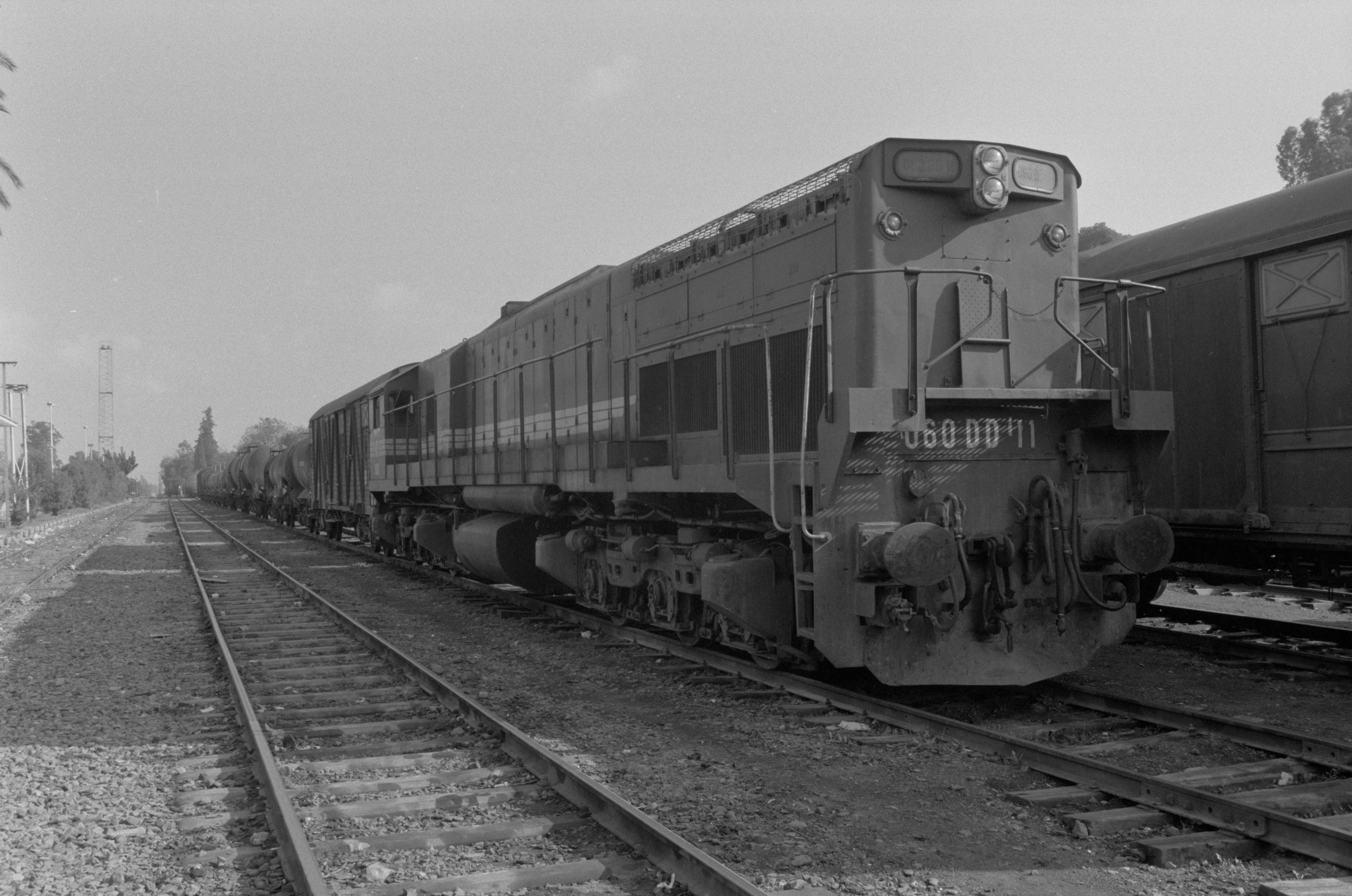
A freight train, hauled by an 060-DD class diesel-electric locomotive, at Chlef station in 1985.

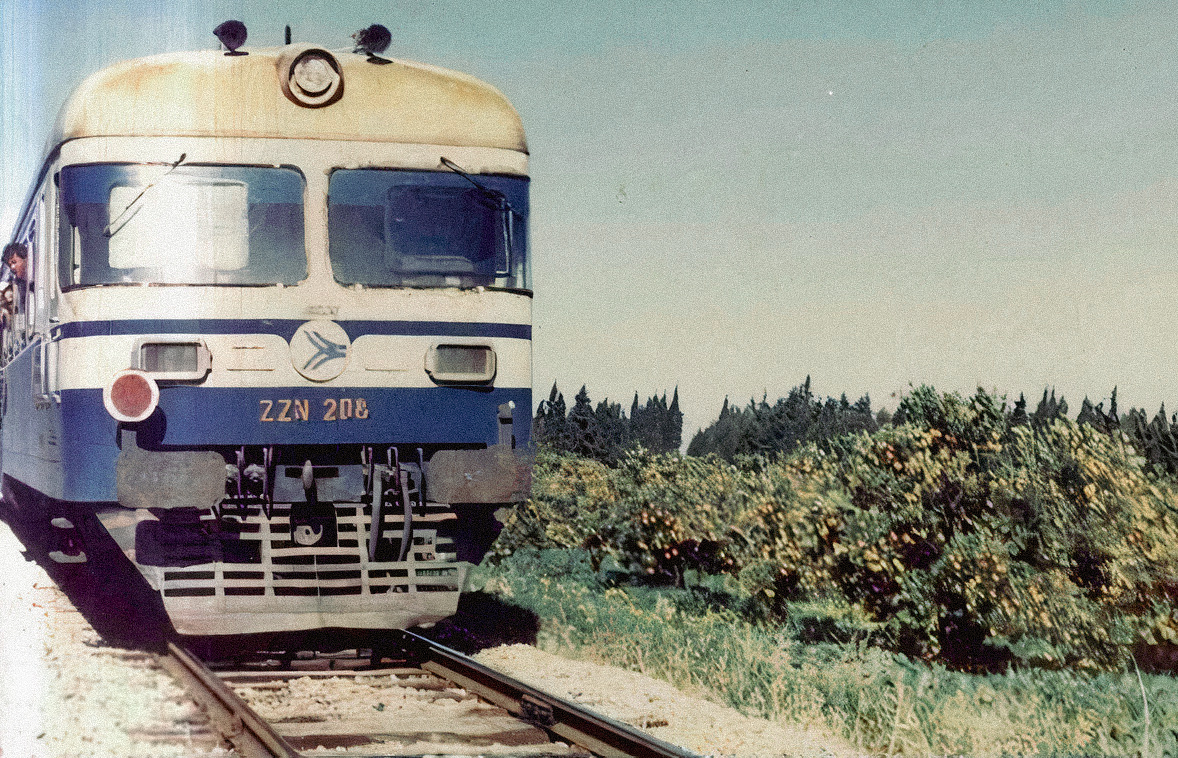
A regional train excursion on the SNTF Fiat ZZN 200 railcar, equivalent to the FS ALn 668.

French railway equipment was retained for about ten years. It began to be gradually replaced from 1972 onwards:

- 32 diesel locomotives, ordered from the former East Germany, replaced the forty-year-old CC 6 AE locomotives of type Co'Co' delivered in 1932;
- 33 railcars from Fiat with 780 hp (580 kW), equivalent to the FS ALn 668, replaced French railcars and some towed trains;
- 29 diesel-electric locomotives with 3,300 hp (2,500 kW), of type CC, were delivered by General Motors.

==== Establishment of the National Company of French Railways in Algeria ====
On March 31, 1976, at the end of the French State's concession, the Algerian State divided the SNCFA into three distinct entities:

- the National Company for Rail Transport (SNTF), responsible for the operation and maintenance of the railway network;
- the National Company for the Study and Realization of Railway Infrastructure (SNERIF), responsible for the renewal and extension of the railway network;
- and SIF, the engineering and realization company for railway infrastructure.

A new investment program allowed the construction of 203 km (126 mi) of new lines, the doubling of 200 km (120 mi) of tracks (from Algiers to Thénia, from El Guerrah to Constantine, and Didouche Mourad), and the renewal of 1,400 km (870 mi) of tracks and ballast.

In 1986, the financial crisis led to the dissolution of SNERIF and SIF, with their prerogatives taken over by SNTF, which changed its status in 1990 to become a Public Establishment with Industrial and Commercial Character (EPIC).

=== The network at the end of the 2000s ===
During the Algerian Civil War between 1991 and 2002, the network experienced numerous attacks on passengers and sabotage of infrastructure, making its operation difficult and dangerous. However, SNTF and its staff managed to maintain the circulation of passenger and freight trains throughout this period.

At the end of the 20th century the Algerian railway network comprised 4250 km of lines, of which 4219 km were operational, with characteristics described in the table below.

Algerian railway network at the end of the 20th century.
Gauge		Electrification		Number of tracks	
Standard Gauge	3,169 km (1,969 mi)	Electrified	301 km (187 mi)	Double Tracks	345 km (214 mi)
Narrow Gauge	1,081 km (672 mi)	Not Electrified	3,949 km (2,454 mi)	Single Track	3,905 km (2,426 mi)

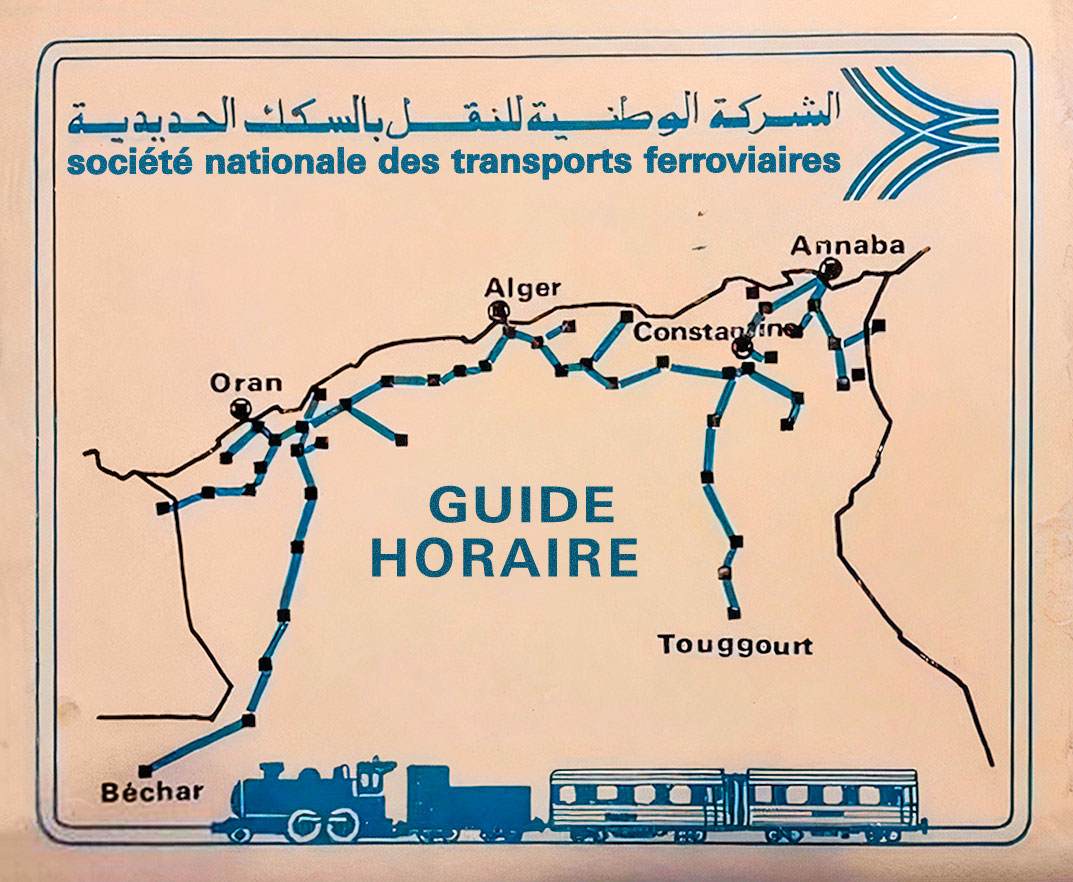
Map of the SNTF network in 1977.

The network consists of four groups of lines:

- the North Loop: Eastern border–Annaba–Constantine–Algiers–Oran–Tlemcen–Western border (standard gauge lines);
- feeder lines: Guelma, Skikda, Jijel, Bejaïa, Tizi-Ouzou, Mostaganem, Arzew, Aïn Témouchent, Ghazaouet (standard gauge lines);
- the East Mining line: Annaba–Djebel Onk, Oued Keberit–Ouenza/Bou Khadra (standard gauge and electrified);
- penetration lines towards the High Plateaus and the South:
  - El Guerrah–Touggourt (standard gauge);
  - Blida–Djelfa; Relizane–Tiaret; Mohammadia–Béchar (narrow gauge).

=== Beginning of the 21st century ===
==== Network expansion and passenger rolling-stock renewal ====
In the early 2000s, after the challenging period of the civil war, the Algerian government and SNTF (National Railway Company) initiated programs to modernize the railway network.

In 2005 the National Agency for Studies and Monitoring of Railway Investment (ANESRIF) was established to manage a new public investment program with the goal of expanding the network to 12,500 km (7,800 mi) by 2025.

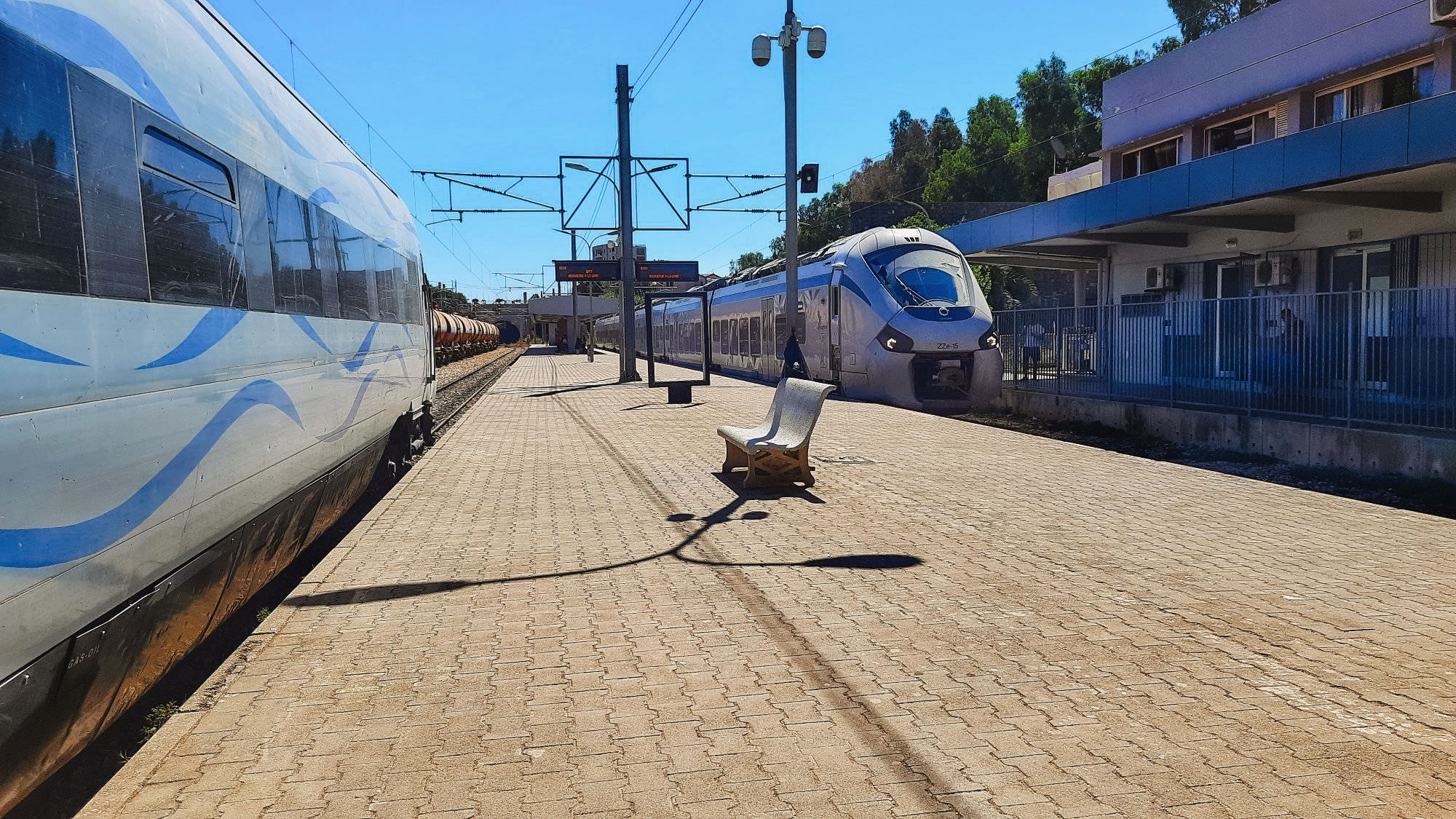
A CAF multiple-unit train ZZ 22 (left) and a Coradia train (right) at Thénia Station on the electrified section of the Algiers suburban network.

In the late 2000s and early 2010s, the Algiers suburban lines were electrified, and nearly 340 km (210 mi) of new lines were commissioned:

- From Aïn Touta to M'Sila in 2009
- From Aïn M'lila to El Aouinet in 2009
- From Bordj Bou Arreridj to M'Sila in 2010

Concurrently with the modernization and expansion of its network, SNTF began renewing its passenger rolling stock by acquiring diesel, electric, or diesel-electric automotor trains to replace trains composed of old passenger cars pulled by diesel locomotives. The acquisitions included:

- 17 diesel multiple-units trains from CAF (Class ZZ 22) for regional services, delivered from 2007;
- 64 electric multiple-unit trains Stadler FLIRT (Class 541) for the Algiers suburban network, delivered from 2008;
- 17 bi-mode electric and diesel multiple-unit Alstom Coradia Polyvalent trains (Class ZZe) for long-distance services, delivered from 2018.
Selection of views of SNTF automotor trains.

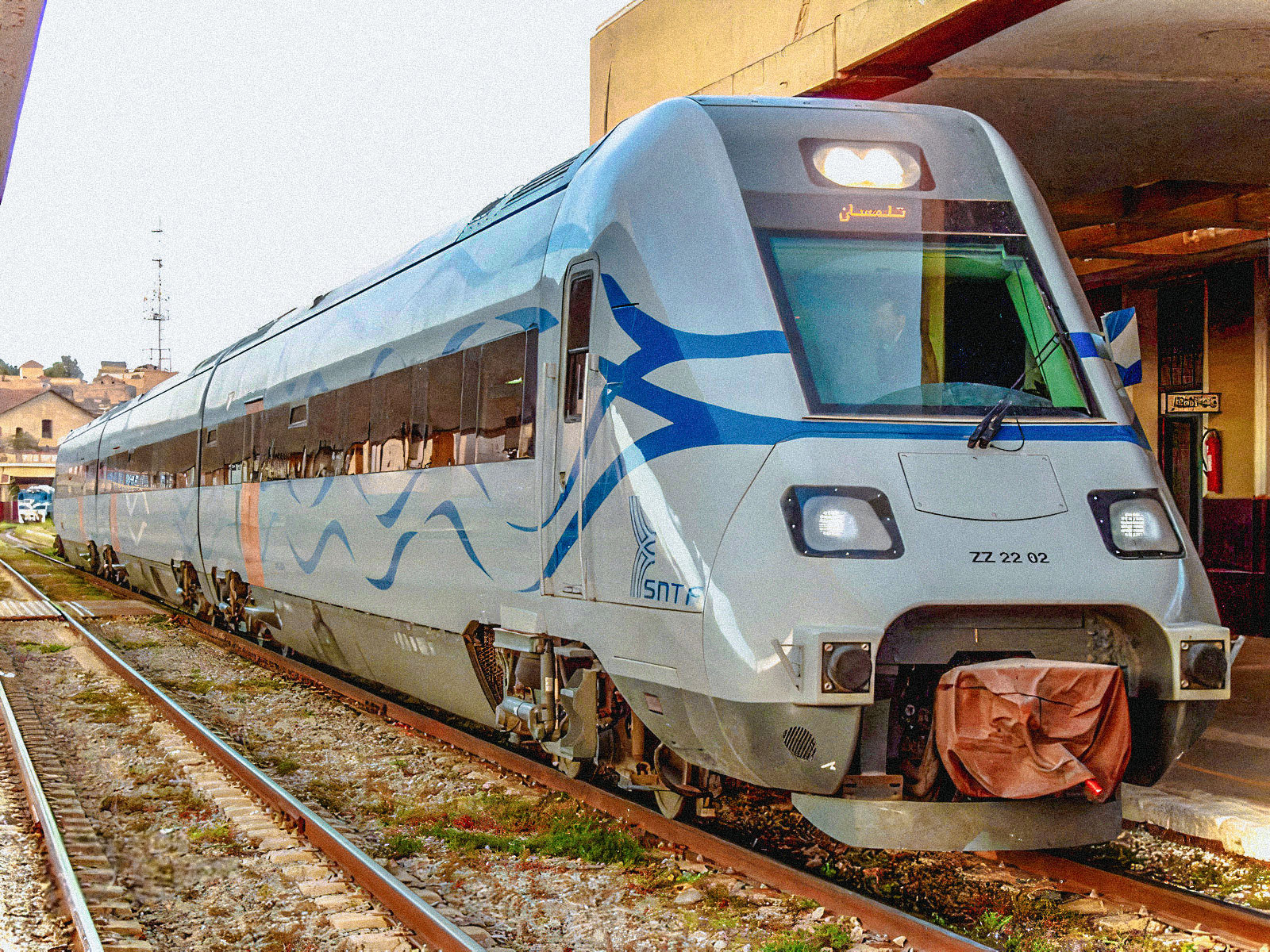
A CAF automotor train (Class ZZ 22).

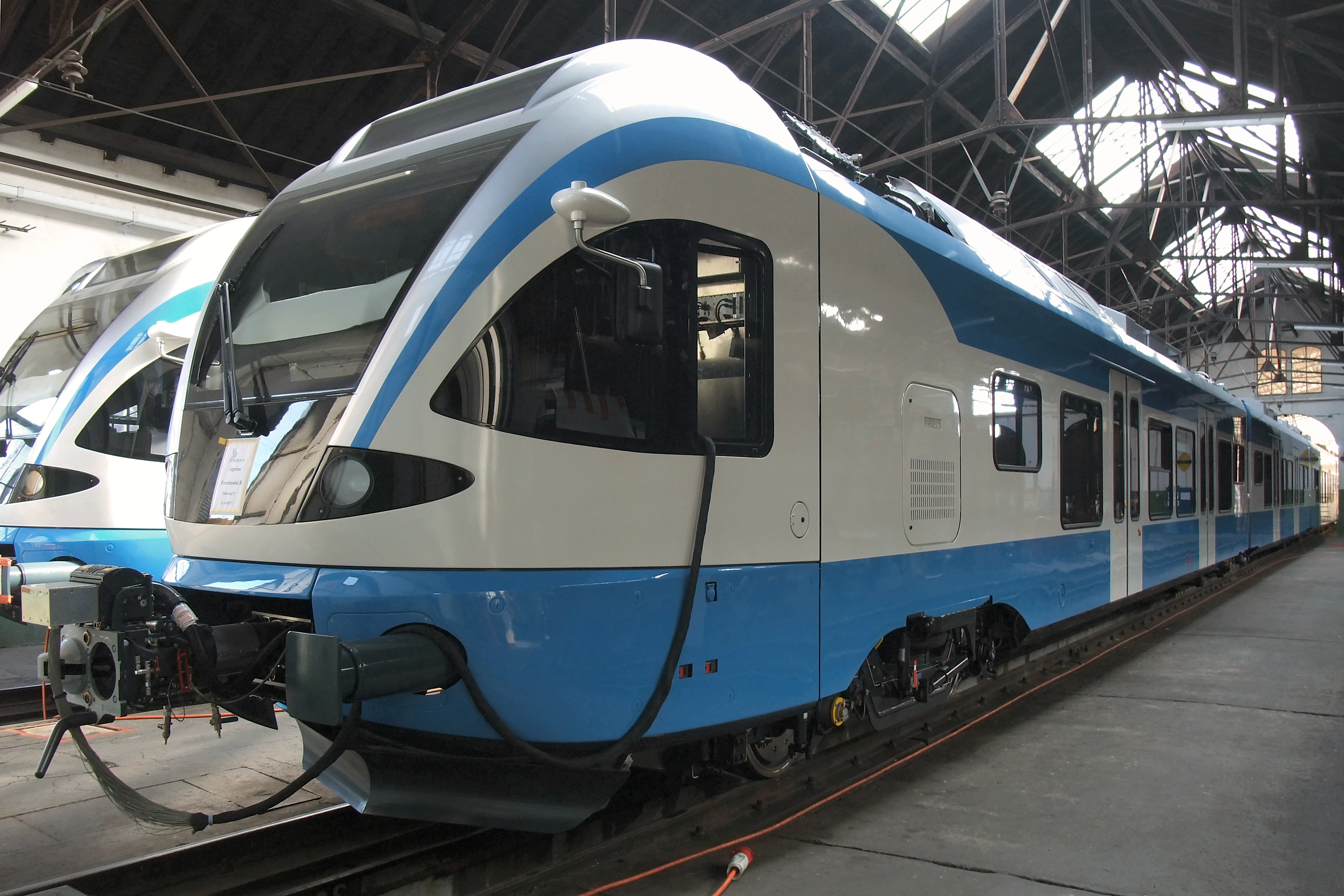
A Stadler FLIRT automotor train (Class 541).

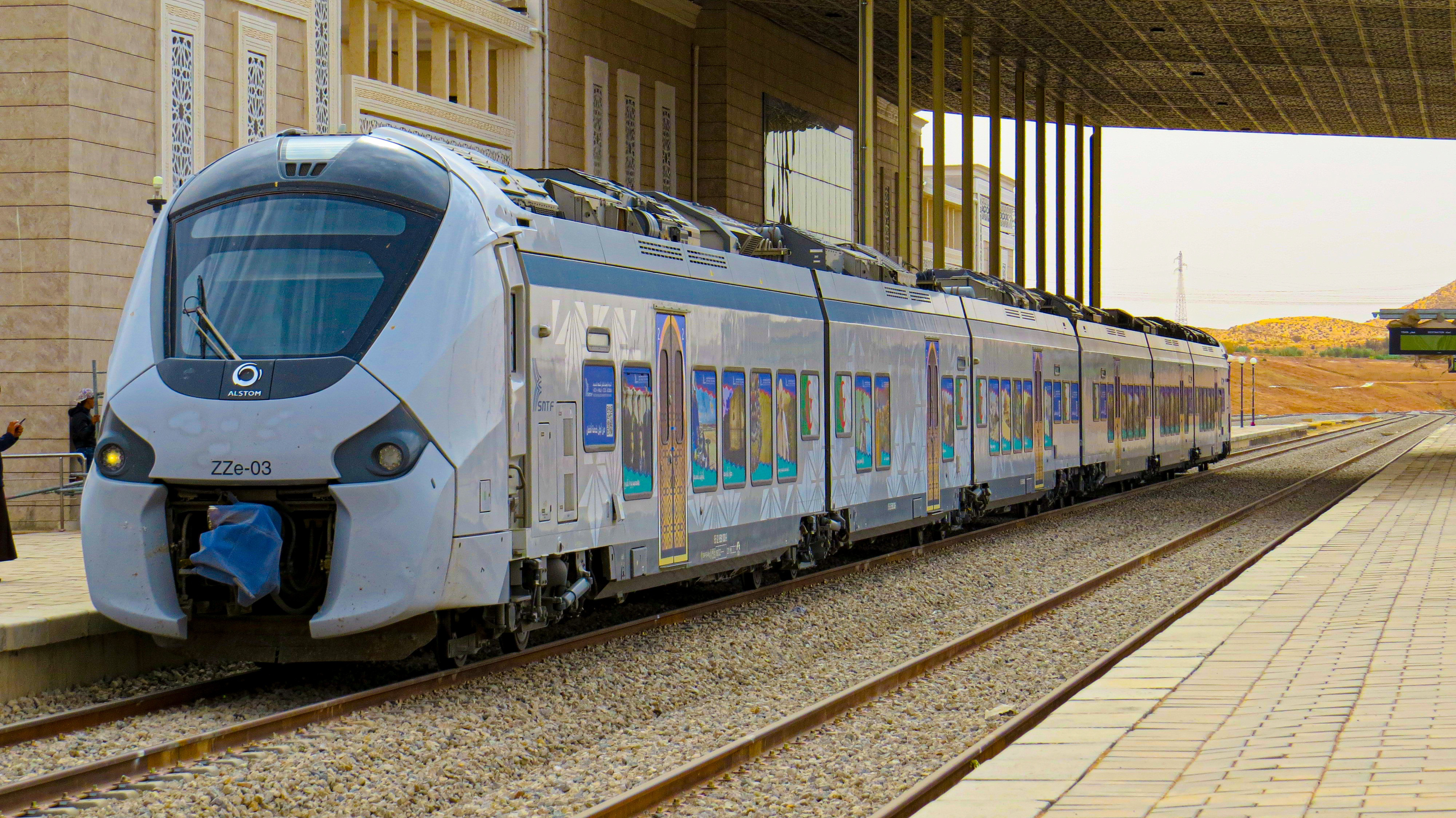
An Alstom Coradia automotor train (Class ZZe).

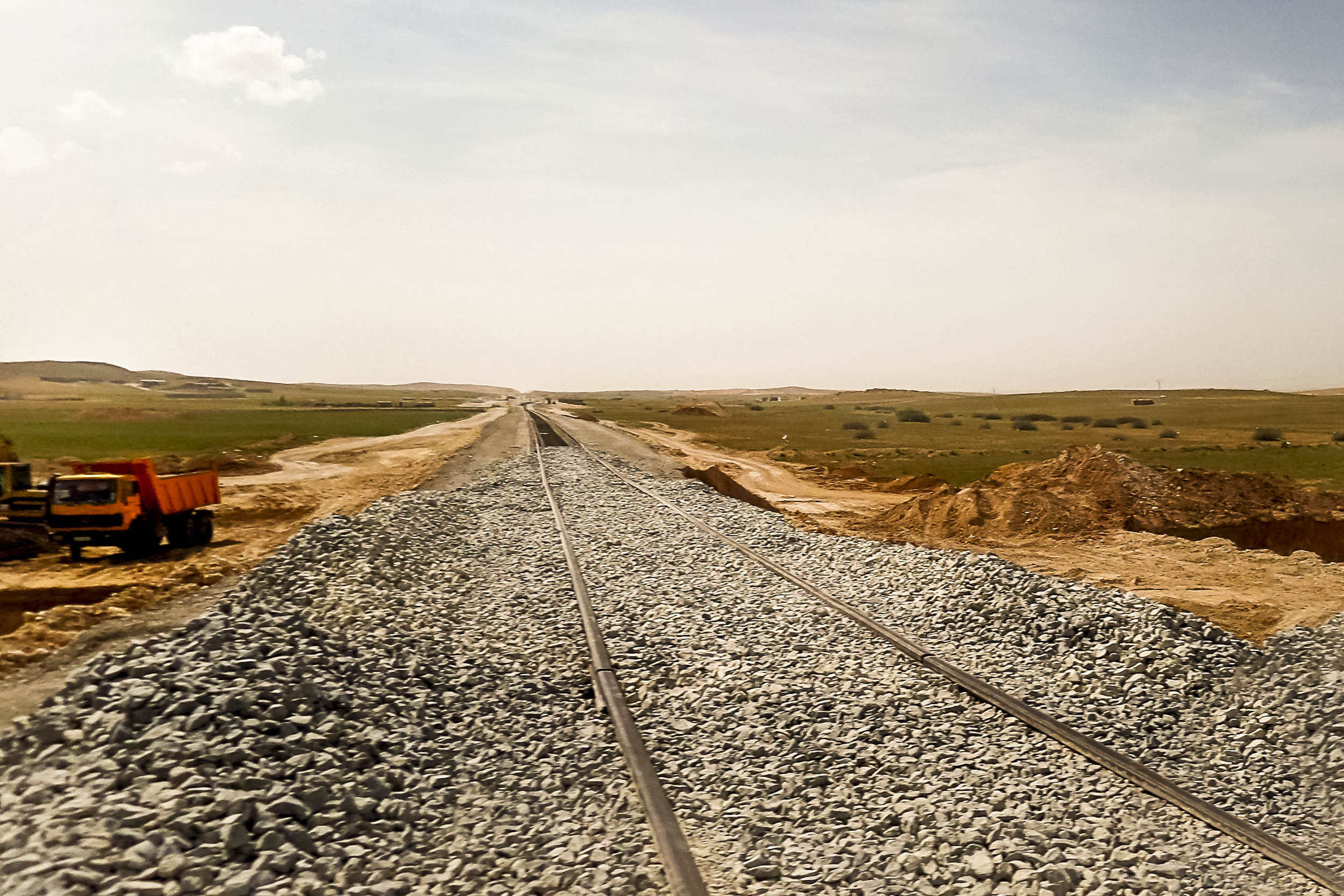
Construction of the Tissemsilt-M'Sila line in 2016.

In 2015, out of a 2,300 km (1,400 mi) program for new lines, 1,324 km (823 mi) were under construction, with the majority focused on the western part of the Rocade des Hauts Plateaux.

On September 10, 2018, ANESRIF inaugurated the GSM-R railway telecommunication system for the first time in Africa. This telecommunication system aims to secure communications on an autonomous network between the center in Algiers and trains, as well as between trains and operators responsible for maintaining the network.

In the late 2010s and early 2020s the Algerian railway network expanded with the opening of lines:

- From Birtouta to Zéralda, in 2016;
- From Moulay Slissen to Saïda, 2017;
- From Tissemsilt to M'Sila, in 2022;
- From Saïda to Tiaret, in 2023.
- From Aïn Beïda to Khenchela, in 2024.
Selection of views of stations built in the early 21st century.

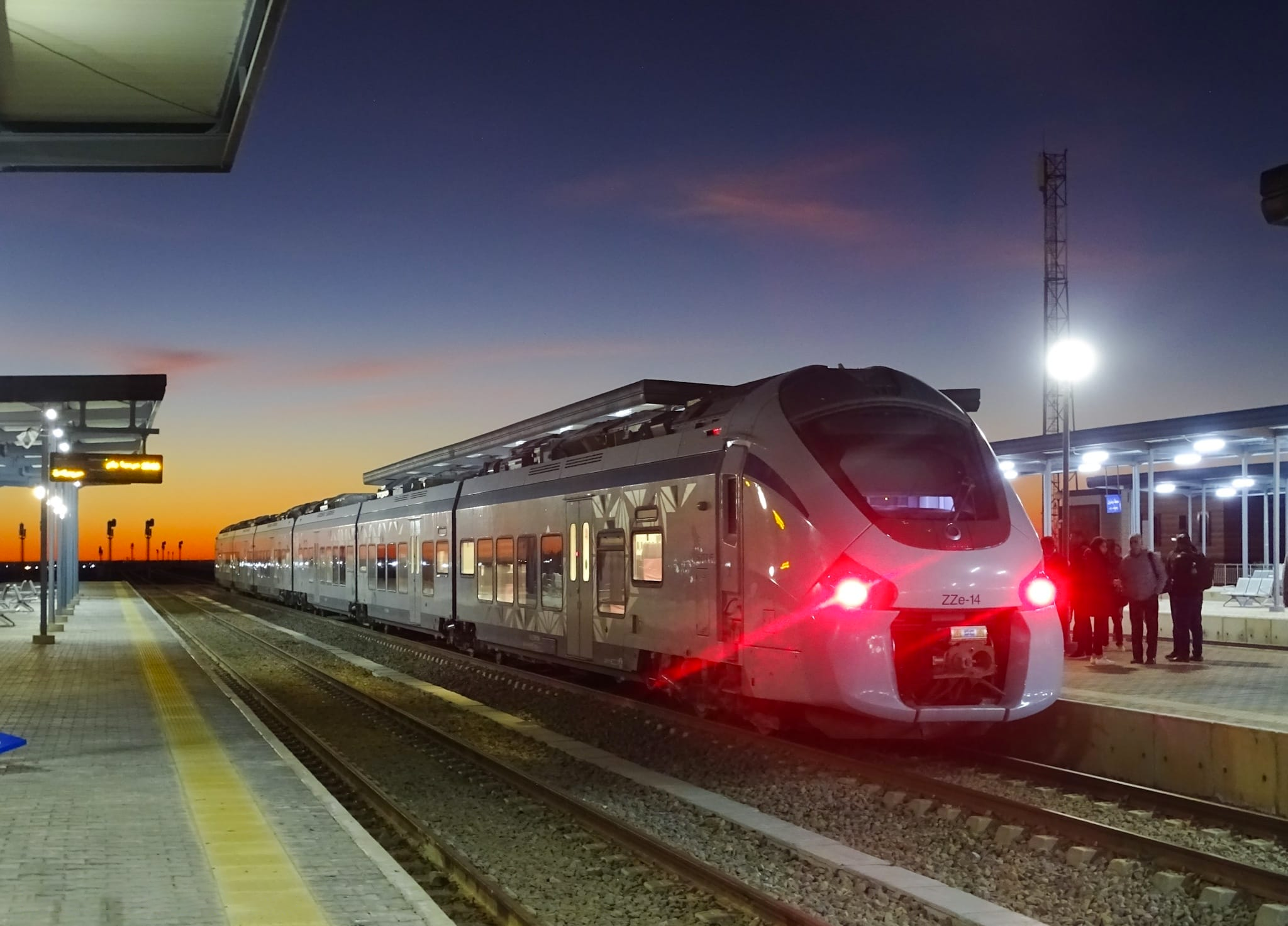
Boughezoul Station, inaugurated in 2022.

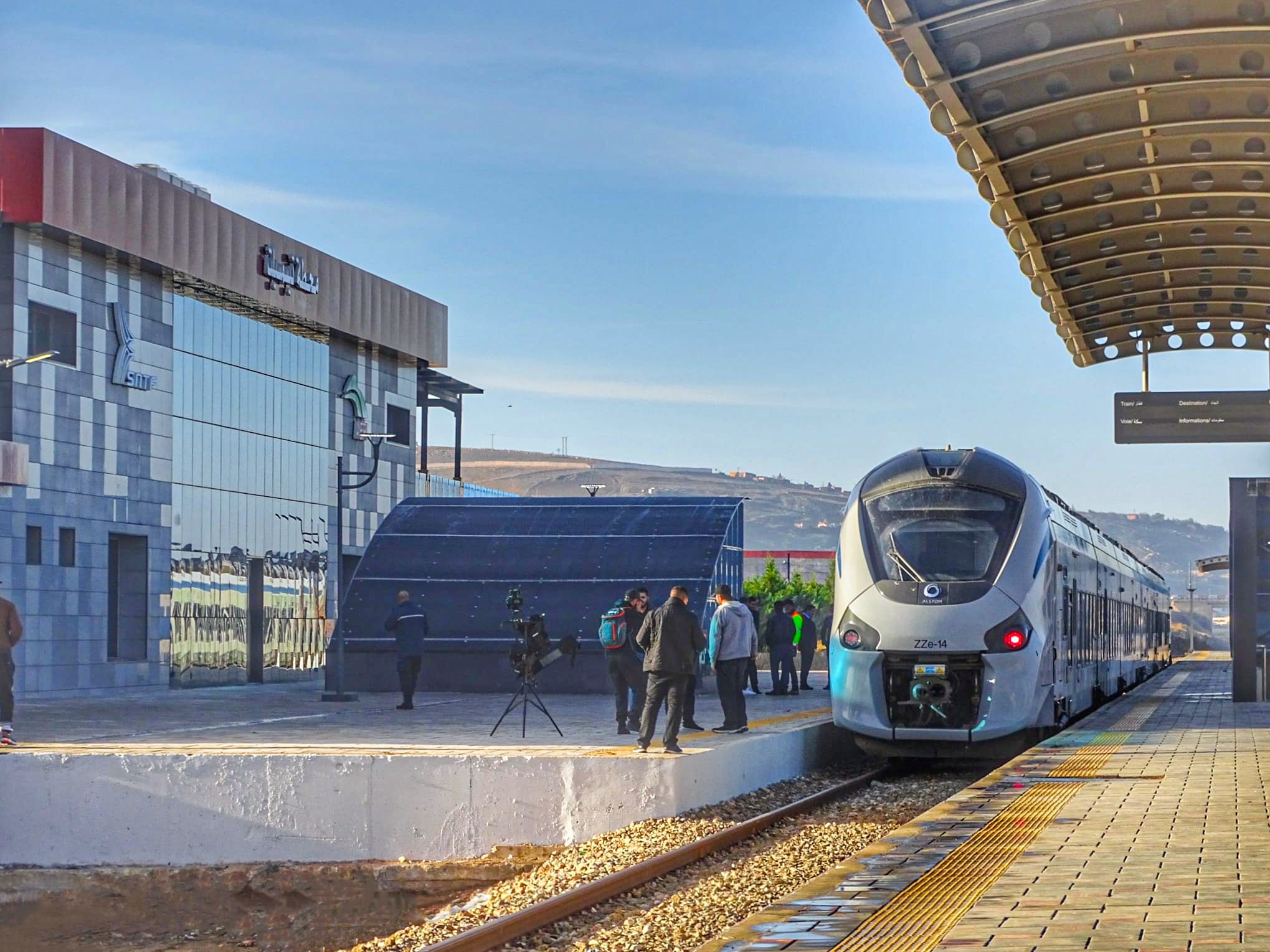
Tissemsilt Station, inaugurated in 2022.

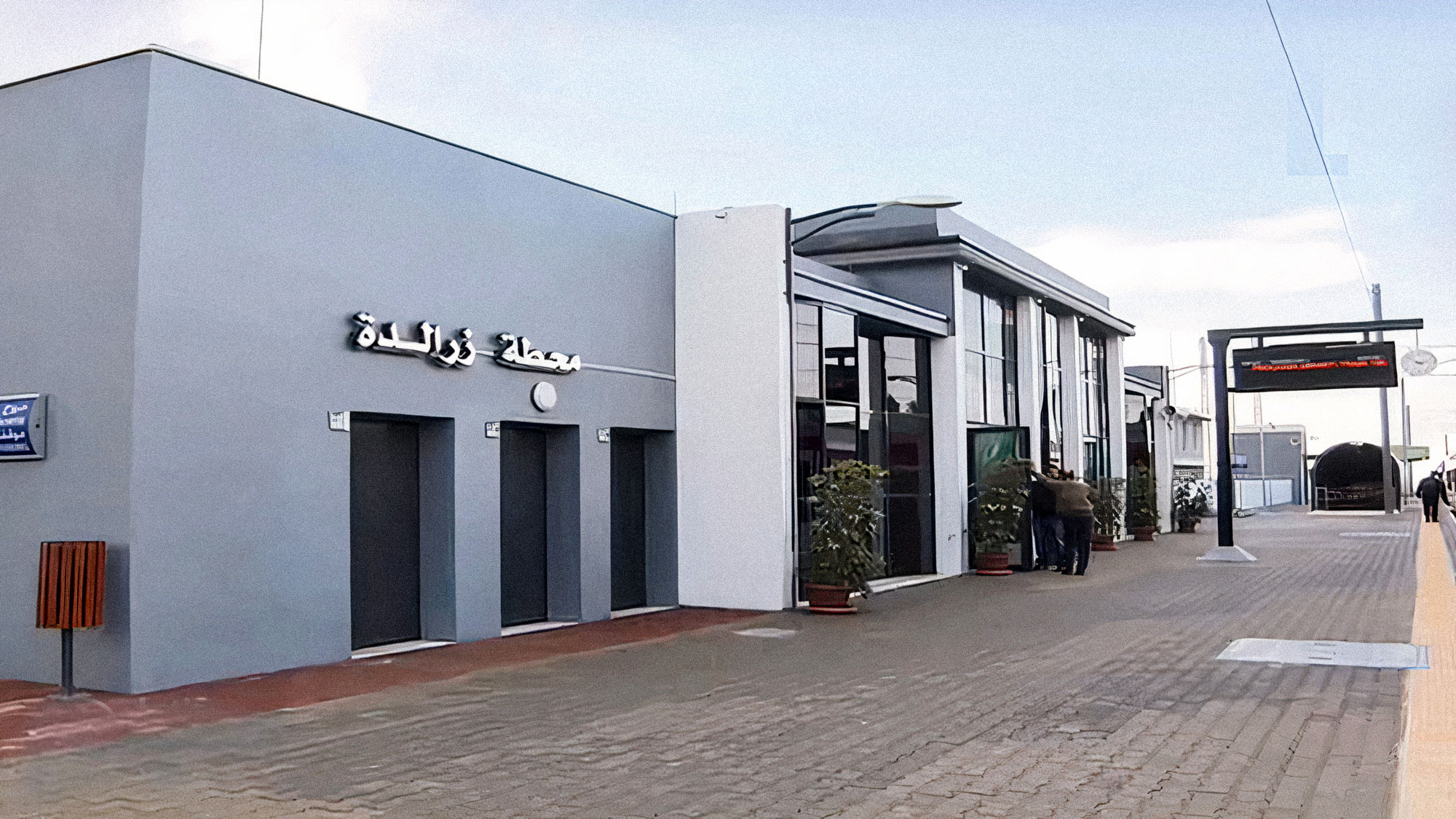
Zéralda Station, inaugurated in 2016.

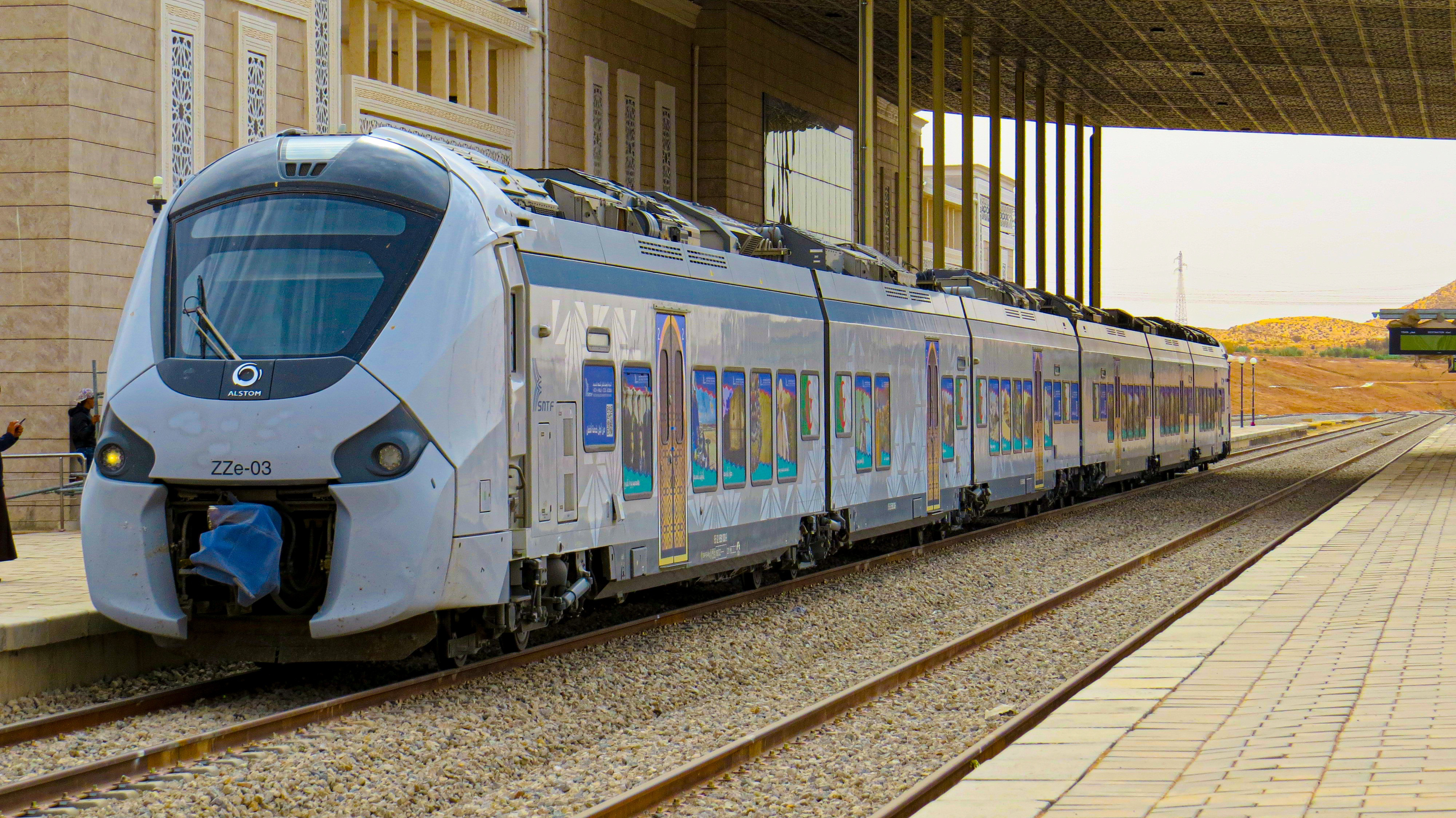
Djelfa Station, inaugurated in 2023.

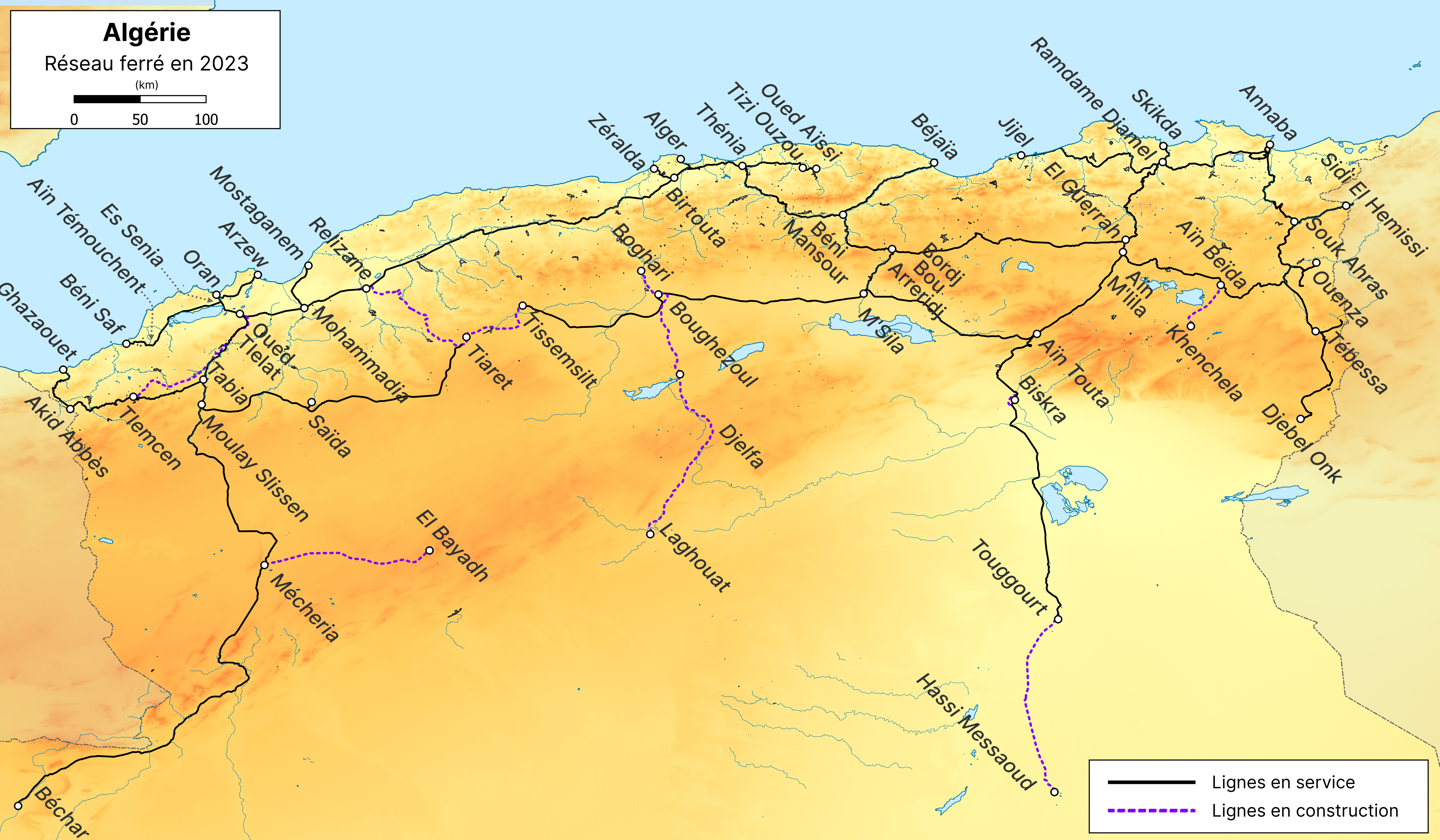
The Algerian railway network in August 2023.

== See also ==
- List of railway lines in Algeria

== Bibliography ==
- Louis Hamel (1885). Les chemins de fer algériens: étude historique sur la constitution du réseau. Le classement de 1857. Adolphe Jourdan. p. 115.
- Jean Courau (1891). Les Chemins de fer de l'Algérie-Tunisie: leur état actuel, leur histoire et leur avenir (PDF). Paris: Michelet.
- P. Caufourier (1913). "Le réseau oranais de l'État (Algérie)". Le Génie civil: Revue générale des industries françaises et étrangères. 63 (1630): 365–370.
- Jacques Poggi (1931). Les chemins de fer d'intérêt général de l'Algérie: aperçu historique, organisation actuelle, programme d'avenir. Paris: Larose.
- Henri Lartilleux (1949). Géographie des chemins de fer français: Troisième volume: Afrique du Nord. Vol. 3 October. Édition Librairie Le Chaix.
- Terushi Hara (1976). "Les investissements ferroviaires français en Algérie au XIXe siècle". Revue d'histoire économique et sociale. 54 (2): 182–211. JSTOR 24079064.
- Pascal Bejui; Luc Raynaud; J-P Vergez-Larrouy (1992). Les chemins de fer de la France d'outre-mer: L'Afrique du Nord, le transsaharien. Vol. 2. La Regordane. p. 272. ISBN 978-2906984134.
- Kamel Ben Amor (2014). Les transports ferroviaires au Maghreb (PDF). IPEMED.
