= Aïn Lechiakh District =

- District
- Country: Algeria
- Province: Aïn Defla Province
- Time zone: UTC+1 (CET)

Ain Lechiakh is a town located in the province (Wilaya) of Ain Defla, Algeria in North Africa. It is approximately 75 miles (121 km) southwest of Algiers. This town was founded in 1902 and was named Voltaire until 1962 the year of independence. From the geographic perspective, Ain Lechiakh is bounded by Oued Chorfa to the east, Djendel up north and Oued el Djemaa to the west, and on the southern side we find a stretch of mountains reaching Kasr El Boukhari. The town is about 40 km from the Mediterranean Sea as the crow flies. Its population was about 14,000 people at the latest census. Many of its inhabitants rely on agriculture and/or small businesses as sources of living; however; the newer generation seems to drift away from such a practice and lean towards professional careers. Its overall weather is a typical North African climate proven to be very convenient for people with asthma.

== Municipalities ==
The district is further divided into three municipalities.

- Aïn Lechiakh
- Aïn Soltane
- Oued Djemaa
