= Amra (disambiguation) =

Amra is the name of certain ancient Irish elegies or panegyrics on native saints.

Amra or AMRA may also refer to:

== People ==
=== Given name ===
- Amra Ram Choudhary (born 1943), former minister in the Government of Rajasthan and BJP MLA
- Amra Đapo (born 1976), Croatian female basketball player
- Amra Kvarandzia, Abkhazian politician
- Amra Pandžić (born 1989), Slovenian handball player
- Amra Ram (born 1955), an Indian politician and peasant leader
- Amra Sadiković (born 1989), Swiss tennis player
- Amra Silajdžić (born 1984), Bosnian-Greek model and actress
- Amra-Faye Wright (born 1960), South African actress in the musical Chicago

=== Surname ===
- Ashraf Amra, Palestinian photojournalist (since early 2000s)
- Mohamed Amra (born 1994), French criminal

== Places ==
- Beit 'Amra, Palestinian village, near Hebron
- El Amra, town in northern Algeria
  - El Amra District, containing the town
- Qusayr 'Amra, an ancient Roman site in modern Jordan
- El-Amrah, Egypt
- Amrah, Syria
- Amra City, planned city in Jordan

== Other meanings ==
- Spondias mombin, a fruit
- American Mechanical Rights Agency, now owned by Kobalt Music Group, a rights management and music publisher in New York City
