= 2010–2012 Algerian protests =

- Part of the Arab Spring
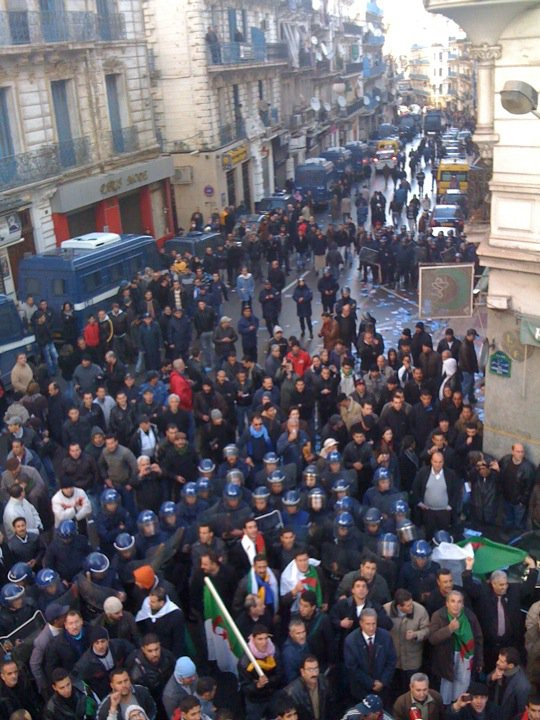
- Demonstration organised by RCD in Algiers
- Date: 28 December 2010 – 10 January 2012 (1 year, 1 week and 6 days)
- Location: Algeria
- Caused by: Authoritarianism; Inflation; Low salaries; Unemployment; Regressive taxes
- Goals: Regime change; Human rights; Democracy
- Methods: Civil resistance; Demonstrations
- Result: Protests quelled

Casualties
- Deaths: 8
- Injuries: 420+

The 2010–2012 Algerian protests were a series of protests taking place throughout Algeria, lasting from 28 December 2010 to 10 January 2012. The protests were inspired by similar protests across the Middle East and North Africa. Causes cited by the protesters included unemployment, the lack of housing, food-price inflation, corruption, restrictions on freedom of speech and poor living conditions. While localized protests were already commonplace over previous years, extending into December 2010, an unprecedented wave of simultaneous protests and riots, sparked by sudden rises in staple food prices, erupted all over the country starting in January 2011. These were quelled by government measures to lower food prices, but were followed by a wave of self-immolations, most of them in front of government buildings. Opposition parties, unions, and human rights organisations then began to hold weekly demonstrations, despite these being illegal without government permission under the ongoing state of emergency; the government suppressed these demonstrations as far as possible, but in late February yielded to pressure and lifted the state of emergency. Meanwhile, protests by unemployed youth, typically citing unemployment, hogra (oppression), and infrastructure problems, resumed, occurring almost daily in towns scattered all over the country.

== Background ==
After the riots of 1988, the Algerian government had moved towards democracy, holding free elections. However, when the Islamic Salvation Front (FIS) won the first free parliamentary election in 1991, the military staged a coup d'état, voided the election results, declared a state of emergency which remained in force until 2011, and arrested the FIS leadership. This led to the founding of the Armed Islamic Groups (GIA) and the ten-year Algerian Civil War, in which an estimated 250,000 people were killed.

With the unchallenged election of Abdelaziz Bouteflika as president in 1999, civilian government was nominally restored. Violence died down as both guerrillas and soldiers were given immunity for their previous acts under the controversial Charter for Peace and National Reconciliation. Towards the end of his second term, Bouteflika amended the constitution to allow himself to run for a third term in 2009; to no one's surprise, he won the ensuing election, with a very low turnout, according to the opposition and the US Embassy.

Seventy percent of Algeria's population is less than 30 years old. Consequent high levels of youth unemployment, coupled with corruption and widespread poverty, are seen as reasons for dissatisfaction.

The leader of the Rally for Culture and Democracy, Saïd Sadi, claimed that during 2010, there were "9,700 riots and [instances of] unrests" in Algeria. Some protests were about issues such as education and health care, as well as rampant corruption.

=== 29 December 2010 ===
On 29 December 2010, clashes with police were reported in Algiers during protests about the lack of housing. At least 53 people were reported to have been injured and another 29 were arrested.

== National, 3–10 January 2011 ==
In 2011, prices of basic foodstuffs rose significantly in Algeria, in line with global trends but also reflecting newly imposed regulations. Unprecedented protests in neighbouring Tunisia over unemployment were already being reported, contributing to the mood.

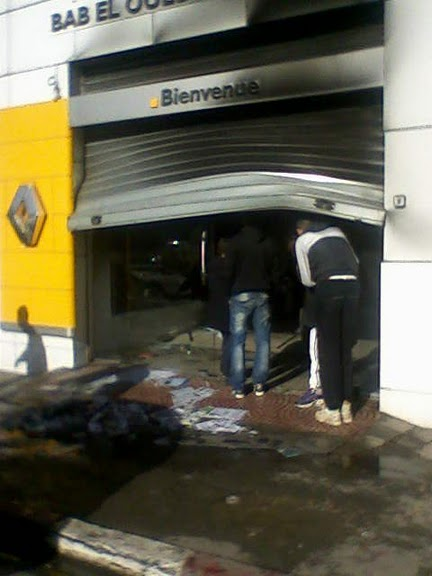
The Renault shop of Triolet near Bab El Oued, burnt in the riots.

Between 3 and 10 January, riots and protests broke out across most Algerian towns, triggered by large increases in the prices of basic foods including oil, sugar, and flour. While localised riots have been a frequent occurrence in Algeria since 2005, this set of riots was the first to spread across most regions of the country simultaneously rather than being confined to a particular area. By 10 January they were limited to a few towns, but continued in those towns. More organised efforts to demonstrate on 11 January in Algiers were suppressed vigorously by the police.

Protests against the price increases started on 3 January, with protest in the Ras El Ain quarter of Oran, and in Fouka and Staoueli near Algiers. On 4 January they were repeated in Staoueli and spread to other areas near the capital, with impromptu roadblocks at Douaouda in Tipasa. and Kolea

On 5 January, major riots broke out in several areas at once: in the Bab El Oued neighbourhood of the capital, Algiers, and nearby suburbs, as well as Algeria's second city, Oran, and other towns including Djelfa, Boumerdes, Annaba, and Tipaza. The young men rioting blocked roads, burned tires, and sacked government buildings, protesting the sudden increase in the cost of living, the demolition of shantytowns, and broader issues such as unemployment. They were met by anti-riot forces, who attempted to disperse the crowds. In Bab El Oued, shops and car showrooms were also targeted. Former Islamic Salvation Front number two Ali Belhadj went to Bab El Oued to see the events and encourage the youths; he was arrested later that day, as were many other protesters and rioters.

Within days the riots spread to twenty-odd wilayahs, covering almost the whole of the north including the Kabylie region, as well as some towns in the Sahara, such as Ouargla and Bechar. Government buildings, particularly town halls, were widely targeted, and shops in some areas were looted or burned; some of the looters carried swords. Football matches scheduled for 7 and 8 January were cancelled.

On 8 January, the government agreed to a temporary cut in taxes and duties on sugar and cooking oil. Facebook and Twitter access were also restricted in some areas. The rioting continued, at least up to 10 January in some places, such as the Bachdjarrah neighbourhood in Algiers. By 11 January, the situation had calmed. An attempt to demonstrate on 11 January in Algiers, organised by the intercommunal committee of Ain Benian and Staoueli, was repressed vigorously by the police. In total, three demonstrators died, more than 800 people had been wounded, and at least 1,100 were arrested, many of them minors.

=== Political implications ===
While riots on this scale are unprecedented since the 1991 election, their wider political implications are not yet clear. The rioters had no collective ties to any Algerian political party, organisation, or trade union, and some sources commented that they seemed to have no political slogans. Some opposition groups emphasised the riots' political dimension; ex-diplomat and opposition spokesperson Mohamed Larbi Zitout described them as "a revolt, and probably a revolution, of an oppressed people", while the Socialist Forces Front responded to the government's lowering of food prices on 8 January with the slogan "The government cannot buy Algerians' silence". Agence France-Presse (AFP) has linked the January protests with events in Tunisia, stating, "In Tunisia, similar unrest sparked the overthrow of the government of Zine Al Abidine Ben Ali, whose 23 years in power ended with his flight to Saudi Arabia last Friday. Algerian commentators have said that more Tunisia-style protests could break out in Algeria." Despite their scale, the riots were dealt with by the government in much the same way as the localised riots that had already become a routine way of communicating grievances: it sought to avoid creating martyrs and made a specific concession (in this case, a return to the status quo ante of allowing un-declared food sales by Cevital) not seen as threatening the overall system.

== Self-immolations (starting 12 January) ==
Mohsen Bouterfif in the hospital showing the wounds from his self-immolation

As the widely reported protests sparked off by Mohamed Bouazizi's self-immolation in Tunisia began to have a clear impact on the Tunisian government, a wave of self-immolations swept Algeria. These individual acts of protest mostly took place in front of a government building following an unsuccessful approach to the authorities. Four self-immolators have died of their burns so far.

It began on 12 January, when 26-year-old Mohamed Aouichia set himself on fire in Bordj Menaiel in the compound of the daira building. He had been sharing a room of 30 square metres with seven other people, including his sister, since 2003; he had repeatedly approached local authorities to get on the social housing list and been rebuffed. He has so far survived.

On 13 January, Mohsen Bouterfif, a 37-year-old father of two, set himself on fire. He had gone with about twenty other youths to protest in front of the town hall of Boukhadra in Tebessa demanding jobs and houses, after the mayor refused to receive them. According to one testimony, the mayor shouted to them: "If you have courage, do like Bouazizi did, set yourself on fire!" His death was reported on 16 January, and about 100 youths protested his death causing the provincial governor to sack the mayor. However, hospital staff the following day claimed he was still alive, though in critical condition. Al Jazeera described the suicide as "echoing the self-immolation that triggered the protests that toppled the leader of neighbouring Tunisia." He finally died on 24 January at a hospital in Annaba.

These suicides were followed by dozens more attempted or successful self-immolations across the country, so far without triggering nationwide demonstrations, most of them after the Tunisian dictator Zine El Abidine Ben Ali fled his country on 14 January.

== Response of the parties and unions ==
=== Late January 2011 ===
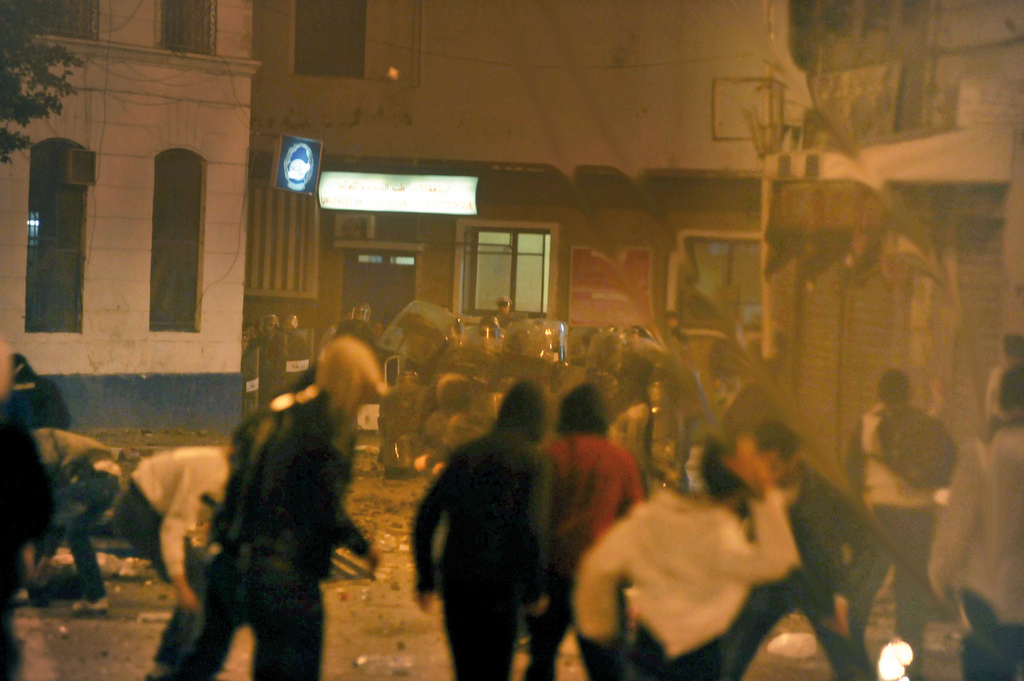
Protesters

A number of left-wing opposition parties, including the FFS, RCD, PLJ, and the Communist MDS, as well as the Algerian League for Human Rights (LADDH) and officially unrecognised unions, such as SATEF and SNAPAP, met on 20 January to discuss responses to the situation. On 21 January, several of them (excluding the FFS) formed the Coordination Nationale pour le Changement et la Démocratie (National Coordination for Change and Democracy), seeking systemic change within the country and calling (along with Rachad) for nationwide marches, starting 9 February. The Interior Minister, Ould Kablia, responded that "No march would be authorised by the authorities in Algiers... Marches are forbidden in Algiers."

Meanwhile, the mainly Kabyle-based secularist RCD party had announced plans for a march for democracy to be held on Saturday 22 January, despite being refused permission by the government under the state of emergency. Prior to the March, RCD leader Saïd Sadi linked the planned march to the 2010–2011 Tunisian protests, stating, "If the opposition does not mobilise the crowds, we believe that we will have more devastating events than what happened in Tunisia. The anger here is bigger than (it was) in Tunisia." He also called for the 1992 state of emergency to be lifted and for the army to withdraw from politics, stating, "The army should no longer be a decision maker, it has to become a state institution." The march attracted about 300 people, and was broken up by the police; 42 people (according to the RCD) or 19 (according to the Interior Ministry) were injured, and 9, including the head of the party's parliamentary group Othman Amazouz, were arrested, to be released later the same day. Some demonstrators waved the Tunisian flag, alluding to the protests which had brought down Ben Ali. Would-be demonstrators coming from Tizi Ouzou were prevented from reaching the scene by the police. On 22 January, 20,000 police officers stopped all protests. In the ensuing clash five people were killed and more than 800 others hurt.

On 23 January, the FFS and LADDH jointly issued a demand for the release of the demonstrators arrested in early January, in Tizi-Ouzou and elsewhere; students of Tizi-Ouzou announced plans for a march on 1 February demanding their release and economic development for Kabylie.

On 29 January, the RCD organised a march of over ten thousand people (according to the organisers) in the city of Bejaia, to demand more freedom and democracy.

=== Early February 2011 ===
Protests continued on 3 February. On the same day President Abdelaziz Bouteflika signaled at a meeting with government ministers his intention to lift the 19-year-old state of emergency in the "very near future", in what was seen as an attempt to quell opposition demands. Reportedly, he also urged the cabinet to adopt measures to promote job creation and said Algeria's TV and radio should give airtime to all political parties. On 4 February, Al Jazeera reported that demonstrations were planned for 12 February.

While Bouteflika was said to be working to counter the planned demonstration, on 8 February university students commenced an "indefinite strike" in protest against the "poor quality of teaching." On the same day, an indefinite strike was also launched by professional paramedics after a call by the trade union SAP. However, it was reported to have been observed in only 22 of the country's 48 provinces.

=== 12 February ===
The day after Egyptian President Hosni Mubarak resigned, the protest gained new currency. The protests were organised by the nascent National Co-ordination for Change and Democracy, an umbrella group of opposition parties, civil society groups and unofficial unions. The police blocked all entry points into Algiers and put in a security cordon around May First Square in central Algiers. All opposition rallies were banned by the government, though at least 2,000 protesters forced their way through the security cordon around the Square to join other demonstrators. Though minor protests occurred earlier in the day, most protesters came out after noon; several thousand protestors clashed with about 30,000 police at May First Square in central Algiers. Protesters chanted "Djazair Horra Dimocratia," ("A free and democratic Algeria") "système dégage" ("government out") and "Yesterday Egypt, today Algeria."

Police fired tear gas on the protesters and arrested hundreds to possibly more than a 10,000 people, including human rights activists and trade union members. The Algerian League for the Defense of Human Rights said that up to 28,000 police officers were deployed in Algiers. Many people, including a member of the People's National Assembly, Boubkeur Derguini of the RCD, were injured.

Protesters had hoped to stay the night at the main square. At almost 19:30, Thomson Reuters reported hundreds of people were leaving the demonstrations after about three hours and that the police opened their cordon to let them pass. It also said that about 200 young men from a poor neighbourhood stayed on and that some of them threw objects at the police.

Protests were also reported in Constantine, Annaba, and Oran. There were reports of internet services like Twitter, Facebook and the wider internet to have been disrupted or shut down, however, Renesys denied this had taken place.

Saïd Sadi of the RCD interpreted the large number of police as government weakness, stating, "When you mobilize 30,000 police in the capital, that's a sign of weakness, not strength." He also said that police charged at protesters and arrested 10 people outside the party offices as they celebrated Mubarak's resignation. He added that 90-year-old human rights activist Ali Yahia Abdelnour was "manhandled by the police" and that the protesters were not "an organised demonstration. It was spontaneous. It was an explosion of joy."

=== 13–18 February ===
On 13 February, following a suggestion by Ali Yahia Abdennour of the LADDH, the CNCD called for protests to continue every Saturday in the same square in Algiers, a call confirmed by RCD spokesman Mohsen Belabbes; Ali Yahia Abdennour said that "we will gather momentum as we progress we want our dignity back, yesterday the police has brutally beaten many protesters amongst them a pregnant women, old ladies, a journalist, young men and women, we should carry on protesting until we get our rights." The next day the activist blogger Hchicha called for alternative marches on Friday as well, meant to attract people wanting a change of system but distrusting the political parties involved in the CNCD. Elias Filali reported that police had used tear gas to disperse protesters and to evict families who had occupied newly constructed homes overnight in Algiers.

On 14 February, Foreign Minister Mourad Medelci said the state of emergency would be lifted "within days." Two days later, Prime Minister Ahmed Ouyahia announced the state of emergency would be lifted by the end of February.

Former FLN leader Abdelhamid Mehri called for true democracy, saying the current regime was incapable of solving the country's problems.

On 18 February, a date for which a Facebook group had called for protests, police with water cannons were deployed in the main crossroads of Algiers.

=== Late February ===
Thousands turned out in Algiers for protests but were unable to take control of the main square.

The government officially announced the end of the emergency rule. The country's council of ministers adopted a law revoking the 1993 decree that prolonged a state of emergency originally instituted the previous year, stating that the "law will come into effect as soon as its imminent publication in the official journal".

The state of emergency in the country was officially lifted after being published in the country's official journal, responding to one of the main demands of the protesters. The move legalizes protests outside the capital of Algiers, as long as the government is notified of planned demonstrations at least three days in advance. According to the country's interior minister, Dahou Ould Kabila, protests are still banned within Algiers because of security concerns; he said that "Algiers is targeted by leaders of terrorist groups [because] it gives them media impact. The Algerian League for the Defense of Human Rights, a leader of the protests, said it was a "ruse aimed at fooling international opinion at a time when Arab regimes are under pressure."

=== March ===
Protests continue throughout Algiers, although it is reported that the government has been keeping the country stable, although this momentary peace is expected to end soon.

On 5 March, protests organised by the National Co-ordination for Democracy and Change in Algiers were violently suppressed while in al-Madania neighbourhood of Algiers, a group of youths, wearing banners supporting Abdelaziz Bouteflika, tried to lynch opposition leader Said Sadi, the president of the Rally for Culture and Democracy. Meanwhile, Algeria's oldest opposition party, Socialist Forces Front, has urged Algerians to engage in a "peaceful struggle" for change in the nation.

On 7 March, thousands of community police rallied in the capital Algiers despite a protest ban in the city, accusing the government of ingratitude, and insisting thousands of their colleagues have been killed or injured fighting Islamist violence. Demanding better pay and pensions, they got all the way to the Parliament building.

In Algiers, small group of around 150 or so threw Molotov cocktails at much larger crowd of police.

On 23 March, police in the Algiers suburb of Oued Koriche used tear gas on Wednesday to disperse a crowd of young men who threw stones and Molotov cocktails trying to stop bulldozers from demolishing dozens of illegally built homes. Five police officers were injured in the rioting, during which rioters threw bricks down on police from nearby rooftop and set fire to a car.

=== April–May ===
On 15 April, in a long-awaited televised address, President Abdelaziz Bouteflika said he would seek constitutional amendments that would "reinforce representative democracy" and be submitted to parliament or to a referendum. He also proposed changes to laws on elections, the media or political parties.

On 11 May, 1,500 Doctors attempted to march towards government buildings but were prevented by anti-riot police.

=== February 2012 ===
In late February 2012, Algeria's major Islamist parties announced a coalition ahead of parliamentary elections. A leader of the Movement of Society for Peace called for more opposition parties to join the alliance "to give the best possible chance for the Arab Spring to happen in Algeria as well".

== Local protests over jobs and infrastructure ==
=== Late January 2011 ===
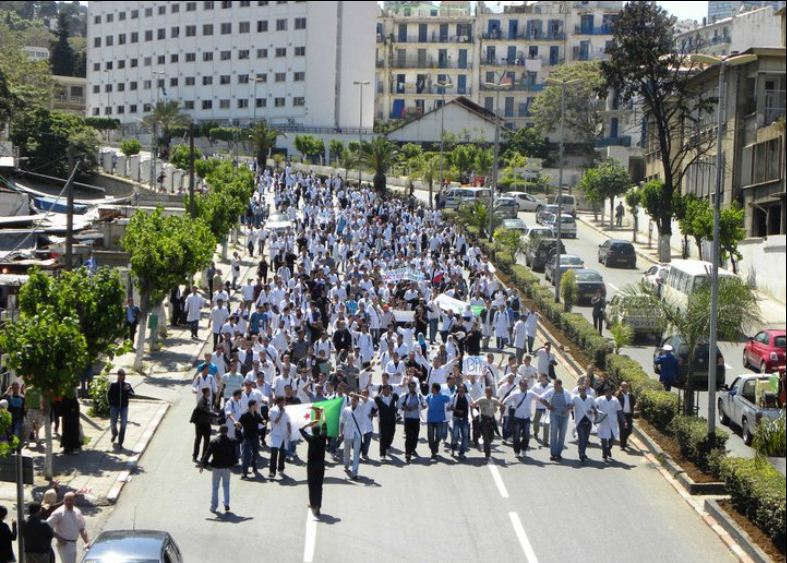
Students marching to el-Mouradia

The opposition group Rachad uploaded film of a non-violent demonstration of "more than 1000 people" demanding housing in the Said Hamdine neighbourhood of Algiers on 20 January, not widely reported.

On 24 January, more than 500 people demonstrated in front of the daira building of Khemis El Khechna, demanding water and gas connection and better housing for their nearby hometowns, Chebacheb and El Kerma. In Tizi Ouzou the same day, parents of youths detained in the protests of early January staged a sit-in in front of the wilaya seat building, demanding the release of their children, who were provisionally released the next day.

On 25 January, the inhabitants of El Djezzar in Batna occupied their town hall, demanding a better road to their village. On the same day, about a hundred inhabitants of Boutaleb near Chekfa blocked the main road, demanding gas and sewage connection for their town and better side roads.

On 27 January, hundreds of inhabitants of Choukrane near Bouira closed the nearby national road (RN 29), demanding gas, water, a sewage system, and public lighting, as well as speed bumps to reduce traffic fatalities. On the same day, dozens of unemployed youths blocked RN 12 in Naciria near Boumerdes using burning tyres and other objects, demanding jobs.

On 30 January, unemployed youths closed the APC seat of Belaas in Ain Defla, demanding jobs (according to the mayor), as well as better water and road management. On the same day, 600 factory workers demonstrated in front of the wilaya seat in Bouira, demanding to be re-hired by ENAD. Also on the same day, unemployed youths in the wilaya of Ouargla demonstrated in Touggourt against the head of the local employment bureau, accused of favouritism.

=== February 2011 ===
On 1 February, the people of Raffour in M'chedallah near Bouira blocked national route 26 with burning tyres, demanding public lighting, a sewage system, and town planning. On the same day, the population of Tazgait in Mostaghanem closed their town hall, demanding that the mayor leave office for failing to do enough about the region's underdevelopment.

On 7 February, youths at Toumiate in El Harrouch near Skikda blocked the national highway RN 3, and were attacked by riot police using tear gas. On 8 February, youths in Sidi Amar near Annaba demonstrated to demand jobs, blocking the road and burning tyres.

From 6 to 9 February, protesters closed the national highway RN 26 at El Kseur near Bejaia, demanding their jobs back or better compensation after the EPBTP milk factory where they were employed made them redundant.

On 8 and 9 February, youths in Naciria and Bordj-Menaiel attacked ANEM offices, confronted police, and closed the national highway RN 12, protesting unemployment and unfulfilled government promises of jobs.

On 13 February, a crowd of youths gathered in front of the Annaba wilaya office demanding the 7000 jobs they had previously been promised, and greeted the governor with stone-throwing when he came out. One attempted suicide, but was dissuaded by his brother.

On 14 February, hundreds of youths protested over unemployment in Akbou; about 30 were hurt in clashes with the police.

On 16 February, youths in Tadmait (Tizi-Ouzou) went out on the streets demanding jobs, blocking the roads (including RN 12) with burning tires and damaging the APC office. Five of them were arrested after confrontations with anti-riot police.

Also on 16 February, about 80 unemployed youths occupied the daira offices in Hassi-Messaoud in protest against poverty and "hogra" (oppression) in the region that provides most of the country's oil income, and were dislodged by promises of jobs next week after hundreds of police and gendarmes gathered. On 17 February, about 500 youths demonstrated in front of the same daira office. Another 100 unemployed youths demonstrated in nearby Touggourt, in front of the local office of the National Employment Agency.

On 17 February, the Annaba wilaya offices were again targeted by demonstrators demanding jobs.

On 21 February, hundreds of students protesting in front of the Ministry of Higher Education against the new LMD system were dispersed forcibly by police. In Ammal (Boumerdes), demonstrators closed the local APC offices, demanding better housing.

On 23 February, villagers from nearby Imaghzarene closed the daira offices of Draa El Mizan, demanding paving, public lighting, gas, more housing, and a clinic for their town. At Ammi Moussa (Relizane) dozens of youths gathered to blockade the town hall, demanding that the president and secretary-general of the APC resign. On the same day, doctors in the Sidi Bel Abbes maternity ward staged a sit-in in protest against the lack of pharmaceutical supplies, which they said was preventing them from carrying out operations. Bouzareah university students announced a strike demanding greater security at the university after a woman student was attacked by unknown assailants, who slashed her face, on campus grounds.

On 24 February, unemployed youths gathered in front of the mayoralty of Sidi Lakhdar near Mostaganem, after blocking the road (RN11) the previous day; they left when the mayor promised to review the housing lists. In Djelida (Ain Defla), the same day, about 500 people closed the APC offices, demanding jobs and protesting at the allocation of 117 new jobs to people from outside the region.

=== January 2012 ===
On 10 January, Algerians protested in Laghouat over housing, infrastructure, and treatment of the elderly by police. The police used tear gas to disperse the protesters.

=== Ramadan 2013 ===
After security forces question three youths who were eating lunch in the Kabylie region during Ramadan, about 300 others joined a protest lunch against the mandatory nature of fasting during the month. The head of the Kabylie Autonomy Movement Bouaziz Ait Chebib said: "We called this gathering to denounce the inquisition and persecution of citizens who, because of their beliefs, refuse to observe the fast."

== Reactions ==
Domestic

In reaction to the protests of early January, starting 8 January the government decreased the prices of essential foods. Over following weeks it increased wheat supplies.

On 3 February Bouteflika announced plans to lift the emergency law, which prohibits protests without a permit, and substitute for it new anti-terrorism laws, but said that protests would remain illegal in Algiers in any case "for well-known reasons of public order". He also announced new measures to create jobs and that state-run television and radio should be open to all political parties. On 14 February, his foreign minister Mourad Medelci repeated the promise to end the state of emergency law, saying it would happen by the end of the month. on 22 February the cabinet voted to lift the emergency law. It also voted on a measure to alleviate unemployment.

In efforts to discourage the protests organised by the CNCD, the authorities played up the role of the RCD, a mainly Kabyle party unpopular elsewhere in the country, within them; while this tactic had some success, it did not stop demonstrators from turning out in some non-Kabyle cities.

International

- European Union – President of the European Parliament Jerzy Buzek said that he "call[ed] upon the Algerian authorities to refrain from violence and respect their citizens' right to peaceful demonstration. Any and all demonstrators arrested should be released immediately. The continuing state of emergency is unjustifiable and clearly hampers Algeria's prospects for the fair, peaceful and sustainable development of the country. It is but a first step in responding to the legitimate democratic aspirations of the Algerian people, but even this step has yet to materialise. Opposition groups, civil society, and especially young people should have the right to freely express their criticism of the government. No government can ignore the call of its people."
- France – Foreign Ministry spokesman Bernard Valero said regarding the demonstrations that "What is important in our eyes us is that freedom of expression is respected and that the demonstrations are able to take place freely and without violence", and welcomed the planned end to the State of Emergency.
- Germany – Foreign Minister Guido Westerwelle said Germany was "on the side of democrats. The German government calls on the Algerian government to renounce all recourse to violence. These are demonstrators who want freedom, who are doing nothing more than exercising a human right, to know the right to defend with dignity their point of view. As democrats we are on the side of democrats. I have already said that about Tunisia and Egypt. I say it again now in allusion to other countries."
- United States – Department of State spokesman PJ Crowley said that "We note the ongoing protests in Algeria, and call for restraint on the part of the security services. In addition, we reaffirm our support for the universal rights of the Algerian people, including assembly and expression. These rights apply on the internet. Moreover, these rights must be respected. We will continue to follow the situation closely in the days ahead."

Other

Regional financial stock market indices fell on 20 February on concern of spreading instability.

NGOs

- al-Qaeda in the Islamic Maghreb voiced support for the demonstrators against both the Tunisian and Algerian governments in a video released on 13 January 2011. AQIM leader Abu Musab Abdul Wadud offered military aid and training to the demonstrators.
- Amnesty International issued a statement that read: "Algerians must be allowed to express themselves freely and hold peaceful protests in Algiers and elsewhere. We urge the Algerian authorities not to respond to these demands by using excessive force."
- On 21 January, the international group Anonymous declared a cyber-war on the Algerian state on the grounds of censorship, following previous efforts in Tunisia. The next day they brought down the pro-government RND party website, having previously brought down the sites of the Ministry of the Interior and the national TV station.

== See also ==
- Arab Spring
- Democracy in the Middle East
- Politics of Algeria
- 2014 Algerian protests
- 2019-2020 Algerian protests
