= Djendel District =

Coordinates: 36°13′N 2°24′E

- District
- Country: Algeria
- Province: Aïn Defla Province
- Time zone: UTC+1 (CET)

Djendel District is a district of Aïn Defla Province, Algeria.

== Municipalities ==
The district is further divided into three municipalities.

- Djendel
- Barbouche
- Oued Chorfa
