= Djelida District =

Coordinates: 36°11′51″N 2°06′27″E

- District
- Country: Algeria
- Province: Aïn Defla Province
- Time zone: UTC+1 (CET)

Djelida District is a district of Aïn Defla Province, Algeria.

== Municipalities ==
The district is further divided into three municipalities.

- Djelida
- Bouchared
- Djemaa Ouled Cheikh
