= Bathia District =

Coordinates: 35°54′59″N 1°50′17″E

- District
- Country: Algeria
- Province: Aïn Defla Province
- Time zone: UTC+1 (CET)

Bathia District is a district of Aïn Defla Province, Algeria.

== Municipalities ==
The district is further divided into three municipalities.

- Bathia
- Bellas
- El Hassania
