= Bordj El Amir Khaled District =

Coordinates: 36°07′11″N 2°12′09″E

- District
- Country: Algeria
- Province: Aïn Defla Province
- Time zone: UTC+1 (CET)

Bordj El Amir Khaled District is a district of Aïn Defla Province, Algeria.

== Municipalities ==
The district is further divided into three municipalities.

- Bordj Emir Khaled Chikh
- Bir Ould Khelifa
- Tarik Ibn Ziad
