= Rouina District =

Coordinates: 36°15′N 1°49′E

- District
- Country: Algeria
- Province: Aïn Defla Province
- Time zone: UTC+1 (CET)

Rouina District is a district of Aïn Defla Province, Algeria.

== Municipalities ==
- Rouina
- Zeddine
- El Maine
