= Khemis Miliana District =

Coordinates: 36°16′N 2°13′E

- District
- Interactive map of Khemis Miliana District
- Country: Algeria
- Province: Aïn Defla Province
- Time zone: UTC+1 (CET)

Khemis Miliana District is a district of Aïn Defla Province, Algeria.

== Municipalities ==
The district is further divided into two municipalities.

- Khemis Miliana
- Sidi Lakhdar

== Notable people ==
- Mohamed Belhocine (born 1951), Algerian medical scientist, professor of internal medicine and epidemiology.
