= El Attaf District =

Coordinates: 36.2229°N 1.6702°E

- District
- Country: Algeria
- Province: Aïn Defla Province
- Time zone: UTC+1 (CET)

El Attaf District is a district of Aïn Defla Province, Algeria.

== Municipalities ==
The district further divides into two municipalities.

- El Attaf
- Tiberkanine
