= Miliana District =

Coordinates: 36°18′23″N 2°13′48″E

- District
- Country: Algeria
- Province: Aïn Defla Province
- Time zone: UTC+1 (CET)

Miliana District is a district of Aïn Defla Province, Algeria.q+ref

== Municipalities ==
The district further divides into two municipalities.

- Miliana
- Ben Allal

== Notable people ==
- Mohamed Charef (1908-2011), theologian and mufti.
- Mohamed Belhocine (born 1951), Algerian medical scientist, professor of internal medicine and epidemiology.
