= El Amra District =

Coordinates: 36°18′18″N 1°50′49″E

- District
- Country: Algeria
- Province: Aïn Defla Province
- Time zone: UTC+1 (CET)

El Amra District is a district of Aïn Defla Province, Algeria.

== Municipalities ==
The district is further divided into three municipalities.

- El Amra
- Mekhatria
- Arib
