= Boumedfaâ District =

Coordinates: 36°22′N 2°28′E

- District
- Country: Algeria
- Province: Aïn Defla Province
- Time zone: UTC+1 (CET)

Boumedfaâ District is a district of Aïn Defla Province, Algeria.

== Municipalities ==
The district is further divided into two municipalities.

- Boumedfaâ
- Hoceinia
