= El Amra =

Coordinates: 34°55′N 7°01′E

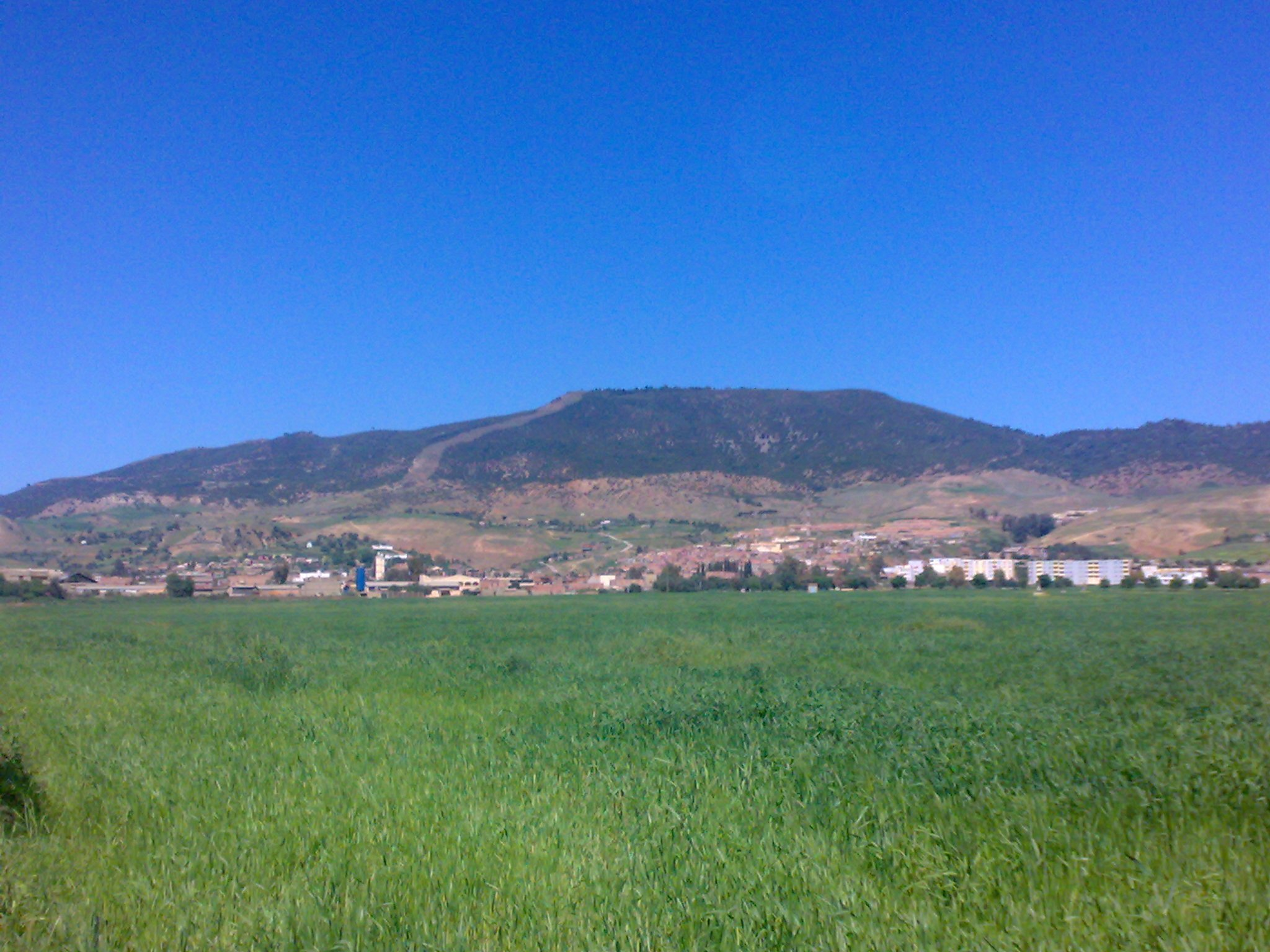

- Country: Algeria
- Province: Aïn Defla
- Time zone: UTC+1 (West Africa Time)

El Amra is a town in northern Algeria.

== Description ==
El Amra, in Arabic: العامرة (the full, opulent) ("crown of agriculture" 2), until the decree of 2 January 1976, is a municipality of the wilaya Of Aïn Defla in Algeria, located about 15 km north-west of Aïn Defla.

El Amra is a region of plains to the south, but of mountain and forest in the north with Djebel Tsili Mount (798 m) and Mount Djebel Mechta Anneb (1118 m) which are part of the central mass of the Dahra and the Forest of Oued El Khemis.

It lies between the El Arch wadi to the east and a boundary that follows the Wadi Boutaga to the west of Oued El Khemis to the west. In the South, the Chelif delimits and waters it.

Some ruins called Kherba are also in the commune.

== History ==
=== Antiquity ===
In Antiquity it was occupied by the Mazices tribes of the region Which played a part in the constitution of the pre-Roman Berber kingdoms.

The Romans colonized it from the first century AD. and Numerous ruins litter the area. The most important Roman ruin is that of the fort 'Gargra' one and a half kilometers east of the city. Its Roman toponym is unknown. By mistake it was improperly attributed to that of 'Tigava' and 'Tiganda' which are two twin sites to the right and left of the cheliff, west of the present town of Attafs. In Late Antiquity it was a fervent center of Christendom according to a Latin inscription dedicated to Saint Peter and Saint Paul and which can be consulted at the Corpus Inscriptionum Latinarum.

=== Middle Ages ===
During their progression in North Africa between 429 and 439, the Vandals sack the Roman town. The Arabs established the settlement of Miliana, El Khadra (Ain-Defla), Souk -Brahim (El Attaf). The 16th century, saw the arrival of Sidi Ahmed Ben Youssef and the Maraboutic family of the Nedjadjras (Sidi Moussa Ben Nedjar) who settled in the mountains to the north El-Amra.

It was then part of the domain of the Braz confederation, a hybrid of Arab-Berber tribes. The main tribes of this region are Beni Boukni, Beni Mhoussen Beni Sliman, Harrar of Cheliff, Beni Ghomrian, Braz Kbailes, Ouled Ali, Beni Nasseur and even the Larbaa and Beni Frah far to the north. The Ouled Ben Abdeslam and the Touamas (Ouled Toumi) whom the Turks had consecrated, disputed supremacy over these tribes.

=== Modern era ===
The French, entered the region in 1842. In 1866 El Amra was touched by the execution of the Senatus-consulte. In 1867, it was transformed into a colony by the allocation of more than 400 hectares to the Société Générale Algérienne, a colonial agricultural enterprise.

In 1881, the European center of Kherba. Was created and populated by the first French settlers.

In 1886, the metal bridge over the Wadi Cheliff was built. It still exists today (2017), although disused. In 1887, the station of Kherba Railway is open to exploitation.

On 1 January 1890, the center of Kherba, a mixed commune of Braz, was erected as a full-function commune.

Text of the decree published at the Mobacher of 10 July 1889):

June 26, 1889. Decree establishing the full-function commune of Kherba (district of Algiers, district of Miliana).

"Art. The European population center of Kherba, the fractions of Drabla and Rahalla (Boukni douar), Megharsa and El-Harrar (douar of Et-Marrar), as well as the plots and fraction of Ahel -Guebli (Beni-Sliman tribe), TC, Beni-Naceur fraction, and Ouled-Ali fraction (El-Aneb tribe) and T. parcel, Beni-Kabane fraction (Ghomerian douar), Will be distracted from January 1, 1890, of the mixed municipality of Braz (civil territory of Algiers), to form in the district of Miliana (department of Algiers), a municipality of full independent exercise, Place shall be fixed at Kherba and shall bear its name. "

Kherba, is touched, like the whole Chelif plain, by the famine of 1893.

On November 7, 1934, Kherba was hit by the Carnot (El Abadia) earthquake, which caused considerable damage without causing human casualties, unlike the typhus epidemic of 1942.

After Algerian independence in 1963, during the territorial reorganization of the communes, Kherba, part of the department of Orléansville and the borough of Duperré, is attached to Mekhatria (Teghaniout fraction not included).

On the occasion of the inauguration of the Agricultural Socialist Village (VSA), or more commonly El Qaria, Kherba officially changed its name to become El-Amra by deliberation of the Communal People's Assembly on 23 July 1975.

In 1984, during the new territorial reorganization of the communes, Aïn Defla became wilaya. El Amra is one of them, but loses Mekhatria, which becomes a municipality.

=== Mayors ===
The first mayor was Jean Bourgoin.

Then came Abel Béné, Henri Vagnon, Jean Bourgoin in 1898, François Charpillet, 1901-1906-1910, Eugène Chaillet, Albert Vignon, André Eugène, Louis Vagnon 1921, Of Couderc in 1922, Louis Vagnon, of Eugène Bès, and Marcel Canillac at independence

== Economy ==
The municipality of El Amra is primarily agricultural. It is characterized by its wide fields of diverse crops such as potato (the main crop), pepper, and onion.
