= Ben Allal =

Ben Allal may refer to:

- Nordine Ben Allal, a Belgian criminal of Moroccan origin
- Ben Allal, Aïn Defla, a town in northern Algeria.
