= Bouchared =

Coordinates: 36.1691°N 1.9292°E

Bourached
- Interactive map of Bourached
- Country: Algeria
- Province: Aïn Defla
- Time zone: UTC+1 (West Africa Time)

Bourached is one of the municipalities of the Algerian state of Ain Defla, about 150 km away from Algiers. Its area is estimated at 138 km2 and its population is estimated at 35 thousand people, according to the latest statistics for the year 2012.

== Location ==
It is located southwest of the city of Ain Defla, where its municipal headquarters is about 13 km away from Ain Defla. It is bordered to the north by Ain Defla, to the south by the municipalities of Jomaa Ouled Sheikh and Zedine, to the east by the municipality of Jlida, and to the west by the municipality of Rouina.

== Municipality development ==
The municipality of Bourached has experienced significant growth in various sectors, particularly after the construction of the east-west highway, which facilitated its urban development. This expansion has created a conducive environment for launching major projects, one notable example being the wholesale market project.{{fact{}}

In the educational sector, Bourached is home to several institutions. It has a secondary school named "Bourached Al-Taher" and two middle schools, "Mkhaledi Kouider" and "Galloaz Moussa", the latter being established in 1987. A new middle school was recently constructed on the former site of the Bourached Al-Tahir Secondary School, which has since been relocated to a new building opposite the old one for the 2014/2015 school year. Additionally, the "Ahmed Rashidi" Middle School, dedicated to the children of Si Ahmed, was opened in 2001. Bourached also hosts approximately 14 primary schools, with Bahi Al-Hajj being the oldest, established in 1972 in the children of Si Ahmed area.
