= El Abadia District =

Coordinates: 36°15′N 1°41′E

El Abadia District carnot
- District
- Country: Algeria
- Province: Aïn Defla Province
- Time zone: UTC+1 (CET)

El Abadia District is a district of Aïn Defla Province, Algeria.

== Municipalities ==
The district is further divided into three municipalities.

- El Abadia
- Tacheta Zougagha
- Aïn Bouyahia
