= Aïn Lechiakh =

Aïn Lechiekh
- Commune and town
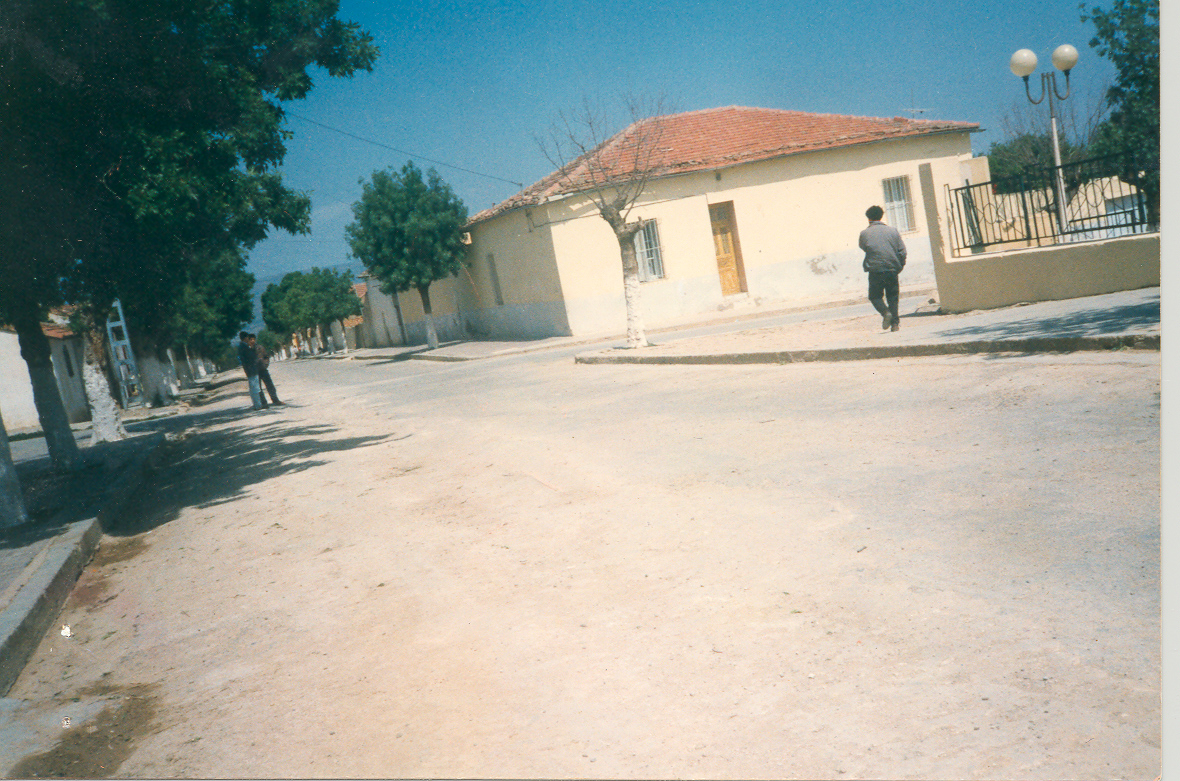
- A street from Aïn Lechiekh

- Location within Algeria
- Coordinates: 36°9′25″N 2°24′15″E
- Country: Algeria
- Province: Aïn Defla

Population (2004)
  - Total: 13 196 (est)
- Time zone: UTC+1 (West Africa Time)

Aïn Lechiekh, or Ain Leckiakh, is a town in northern Algeria. It had a population of 13,196 in 2004. It is a town in the wilaya of Aïn Defla. Ain-Lechiakh is situated 25 kilometers south of Khemis Miliana - the nearest big city in the area - and is on the National Route 3 (RN3), 120 km southwest of the capital Algiers.

== Geography ==
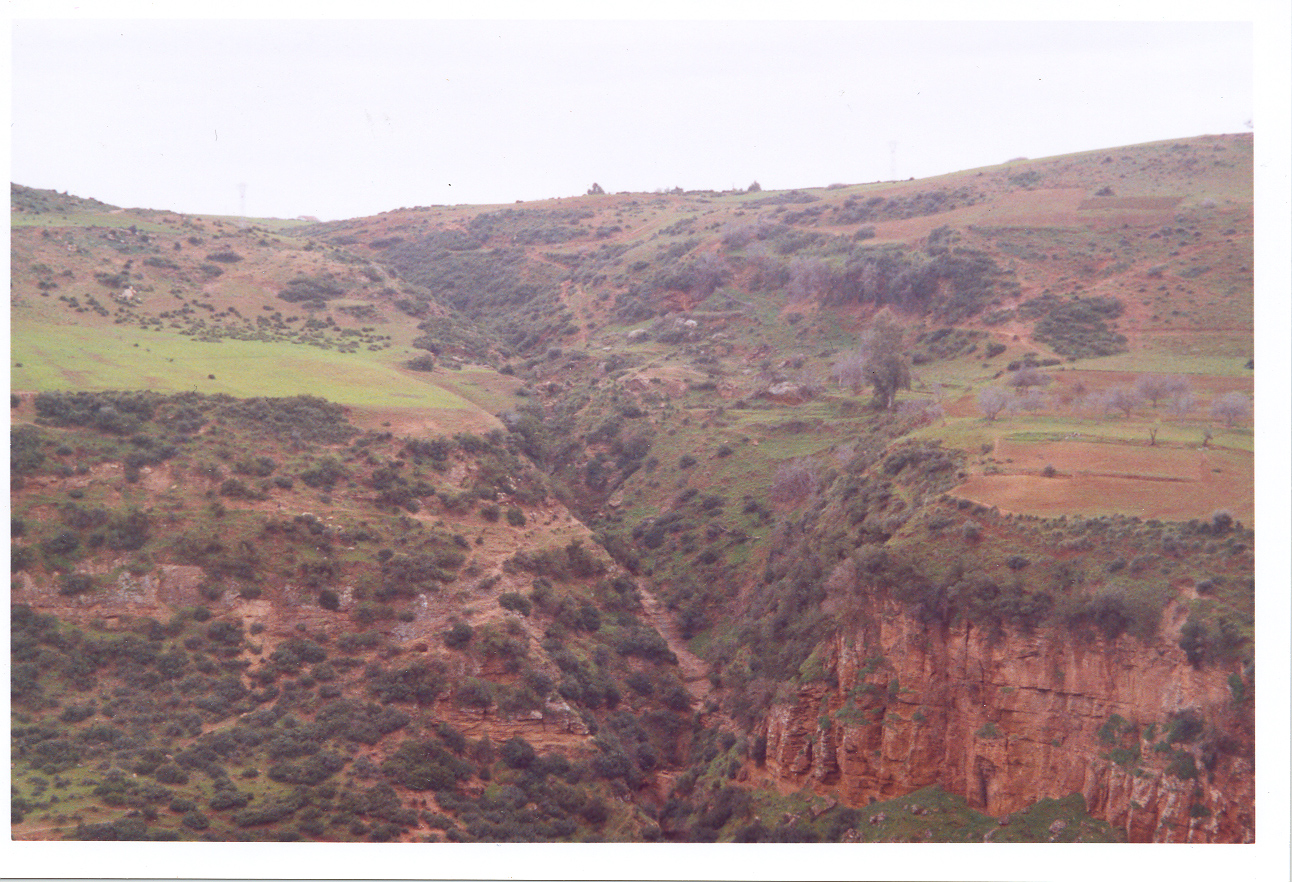

The town is about 40 km from the Mediterranean Sea as the crow flies, though it takes approximately one hour to drive to the nearest beach at Tipaza because of winding roads and the road conditions in some areas.

== History ==
Ain-Lechiakh is mainly an agricultural town, and in the time of the French colonization was completely surrounded by vineyards.

Some of the vineyards were later removed and the land was converted to wheat production. As with most towns and cities in Algeria, Ain-Lechiakh had a French name prior to Algerian independence in 1962. It was named Voltaire, after the famous French writer.
