= Aïn Defla Province =

Province of Algeria

Aïn Defla Province ولاية عين الدفلى
- Province
- Map of Algeria highlighting Aïn Defla
- Coordinates: 36°19′N 2°10′E
- Country: Algeria
- Capital: Aïn Defla

Government
  - PPA president: Mr. Menad Mehdi (FLN)
  - Wāli: Mr. Tikhmarine Lakhdar

Area
  - Total: 4,897 km^{2} (1,891 sq mi)

Population (2008)
  - Total: 771,890
  - Density: 157.6/km^{2} (408.2/sq mi)
- Time zone: UTC+01 (CET)
- Area code: +213 (0) 27
- ISO 3166 code: DZ-44
- Districts: 14
- Municipalities: 36

Aïn Defla (Arabic: ولاية عين الدفلى, is a wilaya (province) in northern Algeria, located to the southwest of Algiers, the capital. Localities in Ain Delfa include Aïn Defla, Miliana, El Attaf, Djelida and Djendel.

== History ==
The province was created from Chlef Province in 1984.

== Administrative divisions ==
It is made up of 14 districts and 36 municipalities.

The districts are:

1. Aïn Defla
2. Aïn Lechiakh
3. Bathia
4. Bordj El Amir Khaled
5. Boumedfaâ
6. Djendel
7. Djelida
8. El Abadia
9. El Amra
10. El Attaf
11. Hammam Righa
12. Khemis
13. Miliana
14. Rouina

The municipalities are:

1. Aïn Bénian
2. Aïn Bouyahia
3. Aïn Defla
4. Aïn Lechiakh
5. Aïn Soltane
6. Aïn Torki
7. Arib
8. Barbouche
9. Bathia
10. Bellas
11. Ben Allal
12. Bir Ould Khelifa
13. Bordj Emir Khaled Chikh
14. Bouchared
15. Boumedfaâ
16. Djelida
17. Djemaa Ouled
18. Djendel
19. El Abadia
20. El Amra
21. El Attaf
22. El Hassania
23. El Maine
24. Hammam Righa
25. Hoceinia
26. Khemis Miliana
27. Mekhatria
28. Miliana
29. Oued Chorfa
30. Oued Djemaa
31. Rouina
32. Sidi Lakhdar
33. Tacheta Zougagha
34. Tarik Ibn Ziad
35. Tiberkanine
36. Zeddine

== Notable people ==
- Mohamed Charef (1908-2011), theologian and mufti.
- Mohamed Belhocine (born 1951), Algerian medical scientist, professor of internal medicine and epidemiology.
