= Aïn Bénian =

Aïn Bénian may refer to:

- Aïn Bénian, Aïn Defla, a municipality or commune in Aïn Defla province, Algeria
- Aïn Bénian, Algiers, a municipality or commune in Algiers province, Algeria
