= Oppidum Novum =

Oppidum Novum is the name of several ancient towns:

- Oppidum Novum (Aquitania), city in Aquitaine, now Lourdes in France
- Oppidum Novum (Caesariensis), city in Mauretania Caesariensis, now Aïn Defla in Algeria
- City in Mauretania Tingitana, today Ksar el-Kebir in Morocco
