= Ashraf Amra =

Palestinian photojournalist

- Known for: Photojournalism in the Middle East

Ashraf Amra is a Palestinian freelance photojournalist who has won multiple local and international awards for this photography. His images have been published in major news outlets including The New York Times, BBC and The Guardian.

== Career ==
=== Early career ===
Amra began his career in photojournalism in the early 2000s, when he was living in the Deir al-Balah area of the Gaza Strip. Amra claims he was given a camera by some older journalists so he could take pictures of incidents which took place near a checkpoint in the Deir al-Balah area.

Amra started working as a freelance photojournalist with many international newspapers. During this time, he won several local and international awards for his work.

=== 2016 travel prevention ===
In 2016, Amra came second place in the Top News category in the Andrei Stenin International Photo Contest, and was invited to Moscow to attend the award ceremony. This was the second year in a row that he came second place. However, Amra was unable to attend the award ceremony due to travel restrictions imposed on residents of the Gaza Strip by the Israeli authorities. This was also the second year in a row that Amra had been unable to attend the award ceremony. Amra blamed the Israelis for his inability to attend the award ceremony, as well as the Palestinian Journalists’ Syndicate for "disunity".

=== September 2023 injury ===
On 15 September 2023, Amra was covering a Palestinian protest near the Gaza-Israel border in the Khan Yunis area. During the protest, Israeli forces used live ammunition, rubber bullets and tear gas, which resulted in the injury of 12 Palestinians, including Amra, who received a severe hand injury. Amra was taken to Turkey for treatment by the Anadolu news agency, for whom Amra was working at the time.

=== Coverage of 2023 Gaza war ===
During the Gaza war, Amra wrote a series of articles for Al Jazeera, which documented the hardships experienced by Palestinian civilians in Gaza.
