= Hammam Righa District =

Coordinates: 36°22′N 2°23′E

- District
- Country: Algeria
- Province: Aïn Defla Province
- Time zone: UTC+1 (CET)

Hammam Righa District is a district of Aïn Defla Province, Algeria.

== Municipalities ==
The district is further divided into three municipalities.

- Hammam Righa
- Aïn Bénian
- Aïn Torki
