= Hammam Righa =

Coordinates: 36°23′N 2°24′E

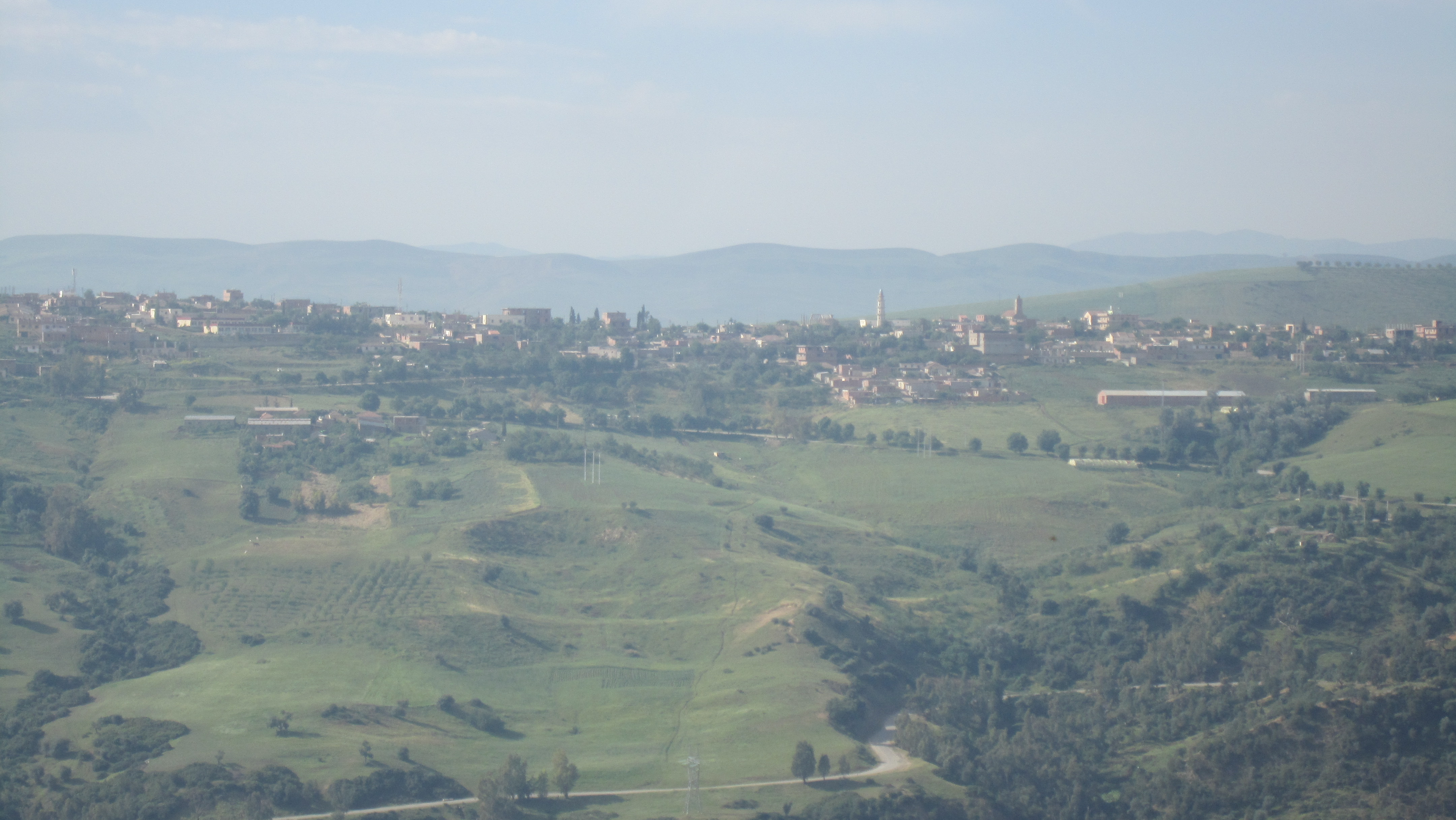
- Nickname: ⵃⴻⵎⵎⴰⵎ ⵔⵉⵖⴰ
- Interactive map of Hammam Righa
- Country: Algeria
- Province: Aïn Defla

Population (2008)
  - Total: 8,488
- Time zone: UTC+1 (West Africa Time)

Hammam Righa (حمام ريغة) (ⵃⴻⵎⵎⴰⵎ ⵔⵉⵖⴰ) is a town in northern Algeria. During the period of Roman occupation, Hammam Righa was a Roman colony called Aquae Calidae. It is located at 36.379474n, 2.395618e near the railway town of Boumedfaâ, and is on the Oued Djer River. The town is the largest of the three towns of Hammam Righa District.

The population in 2008 was 8488. and the population density is 369 persons/km².

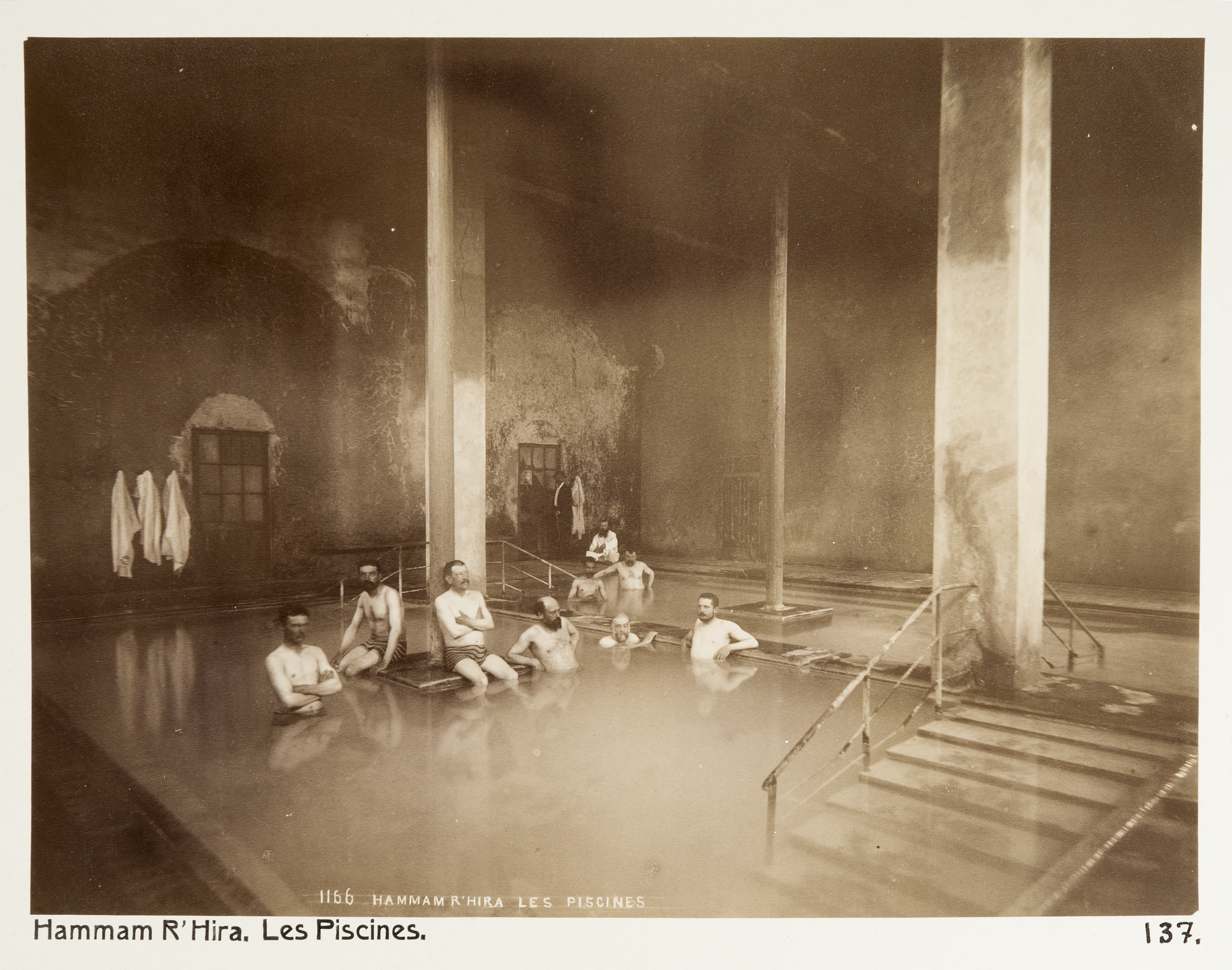
Hammam R'Hira, Algeria

Maurice Audin (1932-1957), mathematician, lived here from 1943 to 1946.
