= Aquae Calidae, Algeria =

Aquae Calidae was a Roman colony of the Roman province of Mauretania Caesariensis. The Roman city has been identified with ruins at Hammam Righa in the wilaya of Chlef, Algeria, North Africa.

== Data ==
The ruins are located at latitude 36.379474N, longitude 2.395618E near the railway town of Boumedfaâ, and is on the Oued Djer River.

The Roman colony was founded by Augustus and flourished from 30BC to about 690 AD, passing through the Vandal Kingdom and Roman Empire into late antiquity.

== History ==
=== Roman era ===
Emperor Augustus established there a colony of his veterans and the city started to grow soon in importance. Augustus even founded -in what is now coastal Algeria- the following Roman colonies: Igilgili, Saldae, Tubusuctu, Rusazu, Rusguniae, Zuccabar, Thuburnica and Gunugu. All these colonies were connected to Aquae Calidae in a military way with strong commercial links.

The importance of Aquae Calidae – as the name indicated – was from the warm waters (reaching nearly 50 C.) that were used for the local famous Roman thermae.

During the centuries of Roman domination Aquae Calidae was a small but rich city with a Forum, theater, baths, library and aqueducts, but nearly all has disappeared. Only a necropolis of the city walls has shown the abundance of evidences about Aquae Calidae Christian past. Under Septimius Severus the city probably reached 5000 inhabitants.

==== Carpis ====
Carpis (Greek: Κάρπίς) or Carpi, a town of Zeugitana, on the Gulf of Carthage, north-east of Maxula, and mentioned by both Ptolemy and Pliny the Elder, was probably identical with Aquae Calidae.

=== Later history ===
Occupied by the Vandals in the fifth century and damaged, the city was recovered to "Romanitas" by the Byzantines and regained importance during the sixth century.

Conquered by Arabs around 700 AD, Aquae Calidae nearly disappeared in the next two centuries.

== See also ==
- Mauretania Caesariensis
- Caldas de Reis, Galicia, Spain
