= Aïn Torki =

- Location within Algeria
- Coordinates: 36°19′58″N 2°18′5″E
- Country: Algeria
- Province: Aïn Defla
- Time zone: UTC+1 (West Africa Time)

Aïn Torki is a town in northern Algeria. It is one of three towns of the Hammam Righa District.
