= Andrei Stenin International Press Photo Contest =

- Genre: Photography
- Begins: 2014
- Location: Worldwide
- Participants: Photographers
- Organiser: Rossiya Segodnya International Information Agency
- Website: stenincontest.com

The Andrei Stenin International Press Photo Contest is an annual contest for young photojournalists aged between 18 and 33. The contest was founded on December 22, 2014 by the Rossiya Segodnya International Information Agency under the auspices of the Commission of the Russian Federation for UNESCO. The contest is named after Andrey Stenin, a Rossiya Segodnya special photojournalist who was killed in the line of duty in southeastern Ukraine.

The competition is aimed at supporting young photographers and promoting the goals of contemporary photojournalism. This is Russia's only platform that helps young photographers make a name for themselves.

In 2017, over 5,000 photos from the record 76 countries were submitted to the contest, which is taking place for the third time. Touring exhibitions have become a tradition for the contest: in 2015 and 2016 the winning photos were exhibited in Cape Town, Istanbul, Tel Aviv, Cairo, Berlin, Shanghai, Budapest, Rome and other cities. The Andrei Stenin International Press Photo Contest not only presents new photographers to the public, but also gives the world's best photojournalists an opportunity to gain a new audience and receive feedback. People follow the news about the contest and look forward to its exhibitions. The 2017 winning photos exhibition took place in Athens, Madrid, Istanbul, Shanghai, Warsaw, Mexico, Johannesburg, Cape Town, Beirut and Budapest.

The annual submission period starts on December 22, on Andrei Stenin's birthday.

== Main criteria and categories ==
Photojournalists aged between 18 and 33 can take part in the competition. The jury will select winners of the first, second and third place for a single photo and winners of the first, second and third place for a series. Some works can receive jury honorary mention. One of the photographers on the shortlist will receive the Grand Prix and will be announced at the official award ceremony. In 2018, the main categories are:

=== Top news ===
This category features important events in the lives of individuals and nations: leading political and social events, reports from war zones and natural disaster sites, as well as decisive moments in people's lives.

=== Sports ===
This category involves entries that feature moments in sport: athletes’ victories and dramatic defeats, regular training and the beauty of sports competitions.

=== My planet ===
This category features works reflecting the entire multicolored palette of topics and images from all over the world. The author's task is to show an everyday life kaleidoscope in its timeless beauty and harmony, uniting scenes from everyday life; the life of big cities and small towns, images of nature, ethnic and religious holidays.

=== Portrait. A Hero of Our Time ===
This category features individual or group portraits. Photos can be documentary or staged. The determining factor in this category is the author's ability to reveal the inner world of their characters, express their mental qualities and character through the uniqueness of their appearance and image as a whole.

== Jury ==
The jury will consist of photographers famous for their ability to present diverse views on the world.

=== 2015 jury board ===
- Andrei Polikanov, director of the Russian Reporter photo service
- Grigory Dukor, chief editor at the Reuters Russia and CIS photo service
- Natalya Udartseva, Russian journalist, photo editor and member of the Russian Union of Photographers
- Vladimir Vyatkin, Russian photographer, member of the International Professional Guild of Photographers in the Media, six-time winner and three-time jury member of the World Press Photo contest
- Attila Durak, Turkish photographer, co-founder and curator of the FotoIstanbul contest
- Timothy Fadek, American photojournalist
- Jason Eskenazi, American photographer.

=== 2016 jury board ===
- Ruth Eichhorn, photo editor at GEO (Germany)
- Denis Paquin, deputy director of photography at Associated Press (US)
- Zheng Wei, deputy director of the Photographic News Department at the Xinhua news agency (China)
- Yury Kozyrev, Russian photojournalist, many-time winner of the World Press Photo contest
- Irina Chmyreva, Russian art expert, senior research fellow at the Institute for Art Theory and History at the Russian Academy of Arts
- Xenia Nikolskaya, Russian photographer, member of the Russian Union of Artists
- Aldo Mendichi, Italian photographer, organizer of educational courses and seminars
- Valery Melnikov, Rossiya Segodnya special photojournalist, many-time winner of international contests.

=== 2017 jury board ===
- Andreas Trampe, director of photography at the Stern magazine (Germany)
- Ian Landsberg, Independent Media photo editor (South Africa)
- Arianna Rinaldo, artistic director of the Cortona On The Move international festival (Italy)
- Natalya Grigoryeva-Litvinskaya, chief curator and founder of the Brothers Lumiere Center of Photography (Russia)
- Vladimir Pesnya, Rossiya Segodnya photojournalist, winner of the prestigious World Press Photo award (Russia)
- Chen Qiwei, president of Xinmin Evening News, head of newspapers and digital media of Shanghai United Media Group (China)
- Varvara Gladkaya, photo editor, teacher at the School of Visual Arts (Russia).

=== 2018 jury board ===
- Anna Zekria, founder and director of the SALT Images, a Russian independent photo agency (Russia)
- Mladen Antonov, Agence France-Presse's (AFP) special correspondent in Moscow (France)
- Jorge Arciga Avila, deputy director of photography at the Notimex News Agency (Mexico)
- Pavel Kassin, head of the photo department at Kommersant (Russia)
- Ahmet Sel, photographer, visual news editor-in-chief at the Anadolu Agency (Turkey).

== Winners ==
In 2015, the Grand Prix was presented to Yelena Anosova (Russia) for the series Separation about women in prisons.

In 2016, the Grand Prix was presented to Danilo Garcia Di Meo (Italy) for the series Letizia, A Story of an Invisible Life about the life of a paralyzed young woman.

In 2017, the Grand Prix went to Alejandro Martinez Velez (Spain) for the series Migrants in Belgrade.

== Interesting facts ==
The 2015 Grand Prix winner Yelena Anosova won the 2017 World Press Photo Award, the world's most renowned photo contest.

Alexei Filippov, the winner of the 2015-2017 contest in the Sports category, won the Istanbul Photo Awards international contest of news and sports photography.

Italian photographer Danilo Garcia Di Meo won the 2016 Grand Prix for a series featuring a paralyzed young woman, Letizia. The jury was moved by her story and provided Letizia the opportunity to visit Russia where she could tell her story and inspire those who were facing the same problems.

The winner of the 2016 contest in the Sports category Vladimir Astapkovich won the annual International Photography Awards (IPA).
