= Tacheta Zougagha =

Tacheta Zougagha تاشتة زقاغة
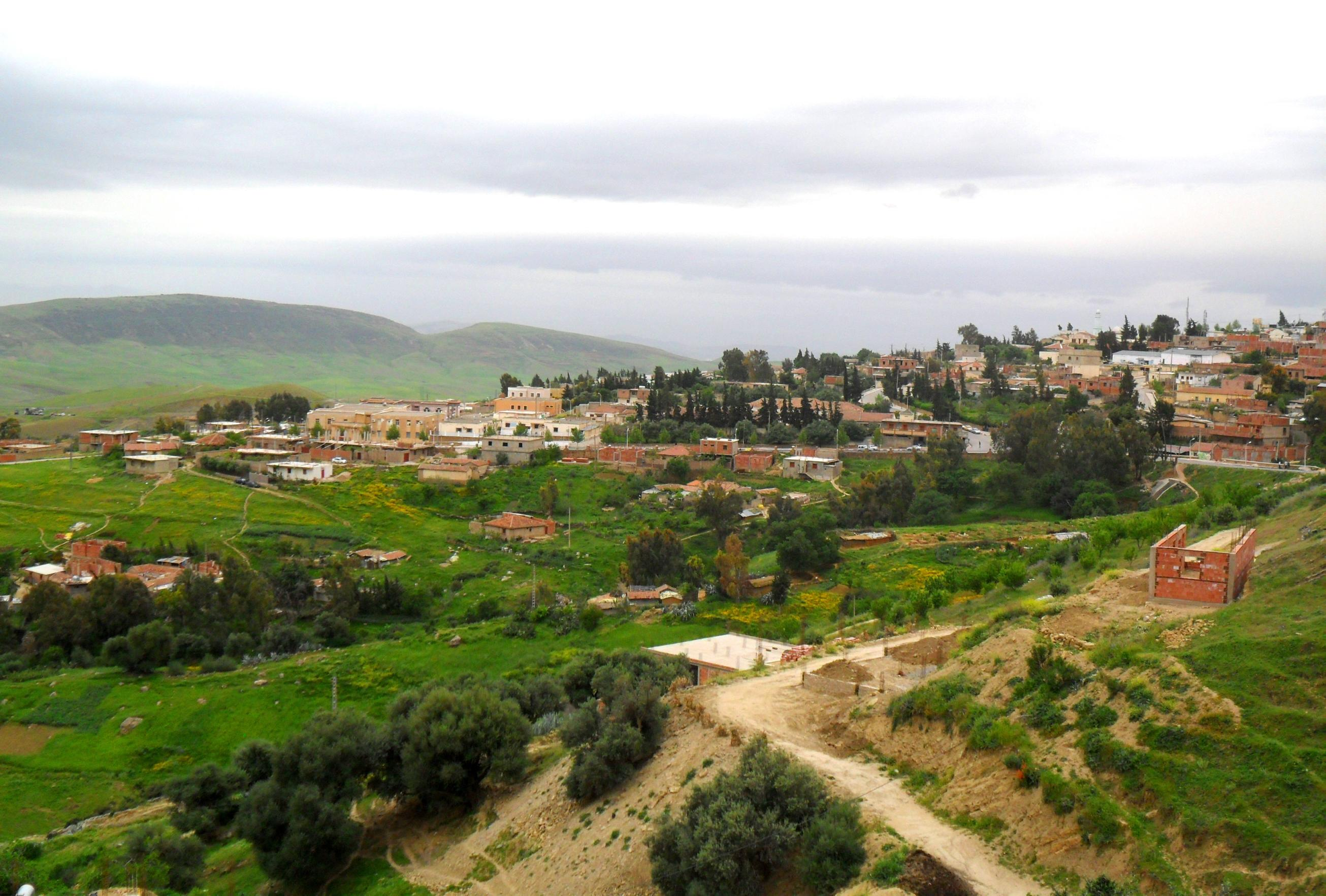

- Location within Algeria
- Country: Algeria
- Province: Aïn Defla
- District: El Abadia

Area
  - Total: 191 km^{2} (74 sq mi)

Population (2008)
  - Total: 23,397
  - Density: 122/km^{2} (317/sq mi)
- Time zone: UTC+1 (West Africa Time)

Tacheta Zougagha is a town in northern Algeria.
