= Djendel =

Djendel Arabic: جندل Berber: ⴵⴻⵏⴷⴻⵍ
- Commune
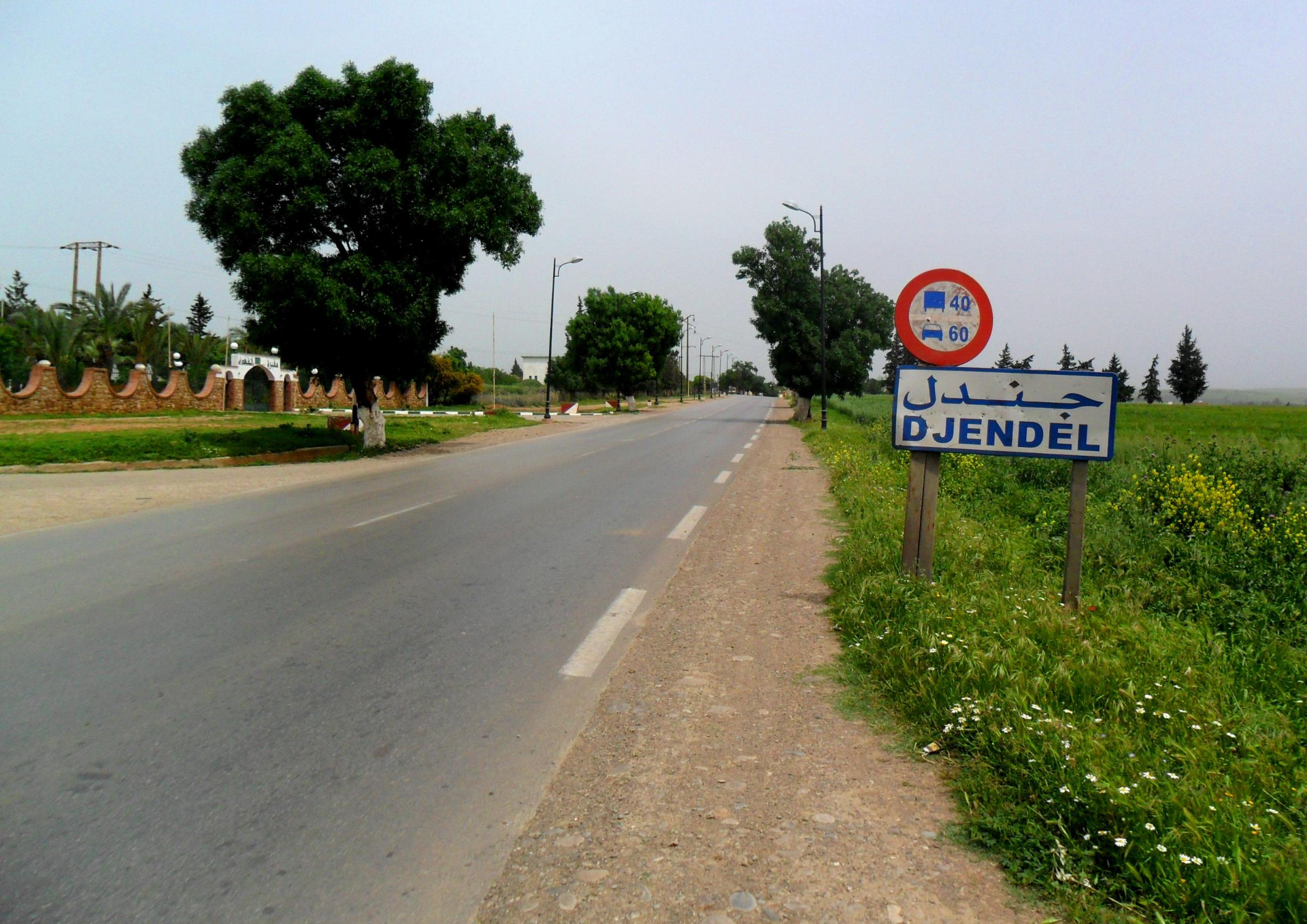
- The boundary of Djendel

- Djendel's location within Aïn Defla Province

- Djendel's location within Algeria
- Coordinates: 36°13′07″N 2°24′32″E
- Country: Algeria
- Province: Aïn Defla

Area
  - Total: 251.0 km^{2} (96.91 sq mi)

Population (2008)
  - Total: 30,170
  - Density: 120/km^{2} (310/sq mi)
- Time zone: UTC+1 (West Africa Time)

Djendel (formerly Lavigerie during the period of French colonization) is a commune in the Aïn Defla wilaya in northern Algeria, located 110 km southwest of Algiers, 40 km east of Aïn Defla, and 30 km southwest of Médéa.

== History ==
Formerly a mixed commune (commune mixte^{[fr]} - an area where Europeans were present though in very small numbers) in the Algiers département of French Algeria, created on 25 August 1880, Djendel incorporated the douars (tribal territories) of Djendel, Ghribs, and Oued-Telbenet.

On 16 December 1905 Djendel absorbed some of the dissolved mixed commune of Hammam Righa. In 1956, it was promoted by decree from a mixed commune to a commune according to the Law of 1884 and was absorbed into the département of Orléansville. The commune maintained its municipal status during the restructuring of 1963, absorbing the former communes of Aïn Lechiekh and Oued Djemaâ (October 1963 for the latter).

In 1893, during the colonization period, the city was named Lavigerie in honor of Charles Martial Allemand Lavigerie. After independence, the commune was renamed Djendel by decree no. 65-246^{[fr]} of 30 September 1965.

== Demographics ==
- Area: 251 km^{2}
- Population: 30,170 (2008)
- Evolution of the population:
  - 16,361 in 1876
  - 18,884 in 1881
  - 26,851 in 1901
  - 34,170 (including 1,154 Europeans) in 1906
  - 6,368 in 1958
  - 8,773 in 1960
  - 24,924 in 1966
  - 26,849 in 1998

== Economy ==
The region is agricultural, and includes the Ghrib Dam.
