= Amrah =

Amrah عمرة
- Village
- Location within Syria
- Coordinates: 32°54′10″N 36°38′29″E
- PAL: 304/258
- Country: Syria
- Governorate: Suwayda
- District: Shahba
- Subdistrict: Shahba

Population (2004 census)
  - Total: 1,691
- Time zone: UTC+2 (EET)
  - Summer (DST): UTC+3 (EEST)

Amrah (Arabic: عمرة) is a village situated in the Shahba District of Suwayda Governorate, in southern Syria. According to the Syria Central Bureau of Statistics (CBS), Amrah had a population of 1,691 in the 2004 census. Its inhabitants are predominantly Druze.

== History ==
A Greek-language inscription from Amrah commemorates the construction of a propylon (monumental gateway) and a column "for the ancestral god" (τῷ πατρῴῳ θεῷ), completed in 165 AD.

In 1596, Amrah appeared in Ottoman tax registers under the name of 'Amra, located in the nahiya of Bani Miglad in the Qada Hawran. It was noted as Hali (empty), but taxes were paid for use of the land, a lump sum of 2,700 akçe.

In 1838 'Amra was noted by Eli Smith as being located in Jabal Hauran, and inhabited by Druze people.

== See also ==
- Druze in Syria

== Bibliography ==
- Hütteroth, W.-D.; Abdulfattah, K. (1977). Historical Geography of Palestine, Transjordan and Southern Syria in the Late 16th Century. Erlanger Geographische Arbeiten, Sonderband 5. Erlangen, Germany: Vorstand der Fränkischen Geographischen Gesellschaft. ISBN 3-920405-41-2.
- Mazzilli, Francesca (2018). Rural Cult Centres in the Hauran: Part of the broader network of the Near East (100 BC–AD 300). Archaeopress. p. 164. doi:10.2307/j.ctvndv916. ISBN 978-1-78491-954-2.
- Robinson, E.; Smith, E. (1841). Biblical Researches in Palestine, Mount Sinai and Arabia Petraea: A Journal of Travels in the year 1838. Vol. 3. Boston: Crocker & Brewster.
