= Djemaa Ouled cheikh =

Coordinates: 36.07793°N 2.00500°E

Djemaa Ouled
- Interactive map of Djemaa Ouled
- Country: Algeria
- Province: Aïn Defla
- Time zone: UTC+1 (West Africa Time)

Djemaa Ouled is a town in northern Algeria.
