= El Hassania =

Coordinates: 35°56′47″N 1°55′01″E

- Interactive map of El Hassania
- Country: Algeria
- Province: Aïn Defla
- Time zone: UTC+1 (West Africa Time)

El Hassania is a town in northern Algeria.
