= Arib =

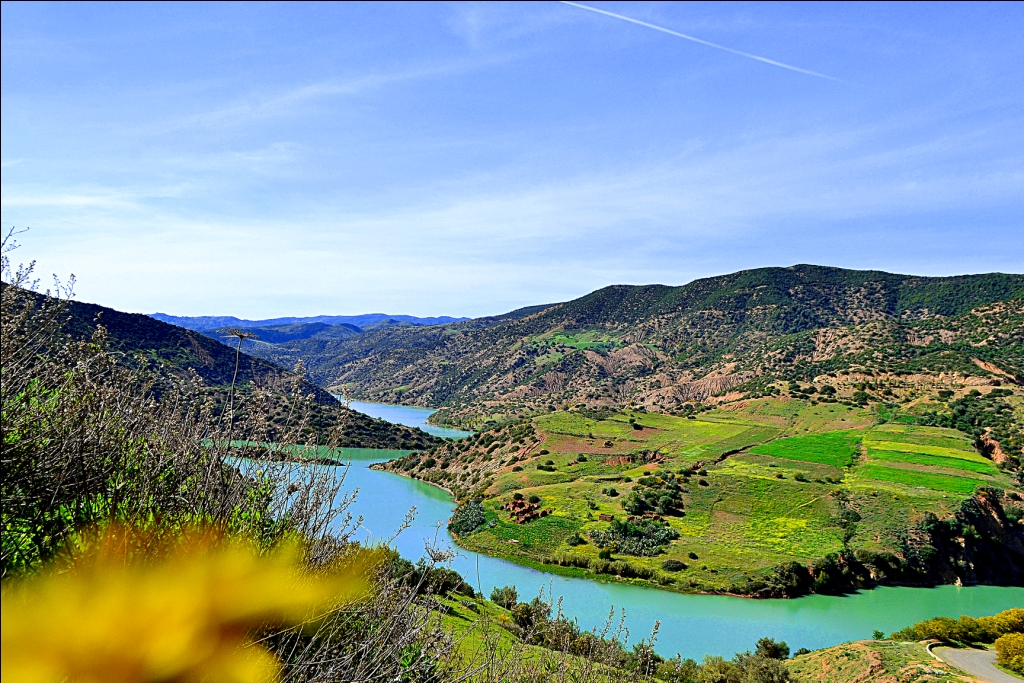

- Location within Algeria
- Coordinates: 36°17′N 2°04′E
- Country: Algeria
- Province: Aïn Defla
- Time zone: UTC+1 (West Africa Time)

Arib is a town in the municipality of El Amra, northern Algeria.
