= Aïn Bénian, Aïn Defla =

Coordinates: 36°21′13″N 2°23′56″E

Aïn Benian
- Commune and town
- Interactive map of Aïn Benian
- Country: Algeria
- Province: Aïn Defla
- Time zone: UTC+1 (West Africa Time)

For the commune of Algiers, see Aïn Benian, Algiers

Aïn Benian, formerly Vesoul-Bénian during the French Algeria period, is a town and commune in northern Algeria. It is one of three towns of Hammam Righa District.
