= Bir Ould Khelifa =

Coordinates: 36°11′N 2°14′E

- Interactive map of Bir Ould Khelifa
- Country: Algeria
- Province: Aïn Defla
- Time zone: UTC+1 (West Africa Time)

Bir Ould Khelifa is a town in northern Algeria.
