= Zeddine =

Coordinates: 36°10′N 1°51′E

- Interactive map of Zeddine
- Country: Algeria
- Province: Aïn Defla
- Time zone: UTC+1 (West Africa Time)

Zeddine is a town in northern Algeria.
