= Hoceinia =

Coordinates: 36°19′N 2°24′E

- Nickname: Bouhalouane
- Interactive map of Hoceinia
- Country: Algeria
- Province: Aïn Defla
- Time zone: UTC+1 (West Africa Time)

Hoceinia is a town in northern Algeria and situated in the eastern side of Ain-Defla province. It is about 96 km in the west of the capital Algiers. Traversed by important highways like RN4, the A1 (Autoroute West-Ouest) and Algiers-Oran railway. Also, it is bordered by the municipalities of Boumedfaa, Djendel, Ain Soltane, Ain-Torki, and Ain Al-Baniane.
