= Timothy Fadek =

American photographer

Timothy Fadek is an American photographer known for covering social issues and conflicts. His photographs have appeared in hundreds of publications worldwide and have been exhibited in major galleries and museums. He is represented by Redux Pictures, a photo agency based in New York and he was a professor at Columbia University Graduate School of Journalism, The International Center of Photography, and the Institut für fotografische Bildung in Berlin.

== Biography ==
Fadek studied Marketing and Advertising at Baruch College in New York, and after 6 years of working at advertising agencies, he decided to change career directions in 1995 and left to study photography at the School of Visual Arts in New York. In 1997 he began working on his first photography projects in New York, and over the course of 20 years, he photographed stories in Mexico, Chile, Iraq, Libya, Tunisia, Mongolia, China, Belgium and Greece.

He was awarded the World Understanding Award by Pictures of the Year International, for his photo investigation "CITY OF MISSING WOMEN" and was one of ten photographers named "heroes of photography" by Popular Photography Magazine.

In 2003 while covering the invasion of Iraq, he and photographers Chris Hondros and Luc Delahaye were ambushed in Nasiriyah by Iraqi soldiers. With their cars disabled, the three walked through the desert for 6 hours at night, before being rescued by U.S. forces.

== Collections ==
Fadek's work is held in the following public collections:

- National September 11 Memorial & Museum, New York
- Solomon R. Guggenheim Museum, New York
- International Center of Photography, New York
- Palazzo delle Esposizioni, Rome
