= Mekhatria =

Coordinates: 35°48′N 0°19′E

- Interactive map of Mekhatria
- Country: Algeria
- Province: Aïn Defla
- Time zone: UTC+1 (West Africa Time)

Mekhatria is a town in northern Algeria.
