= El Attaf =

Coordinates: 36°13′N 1°40′E

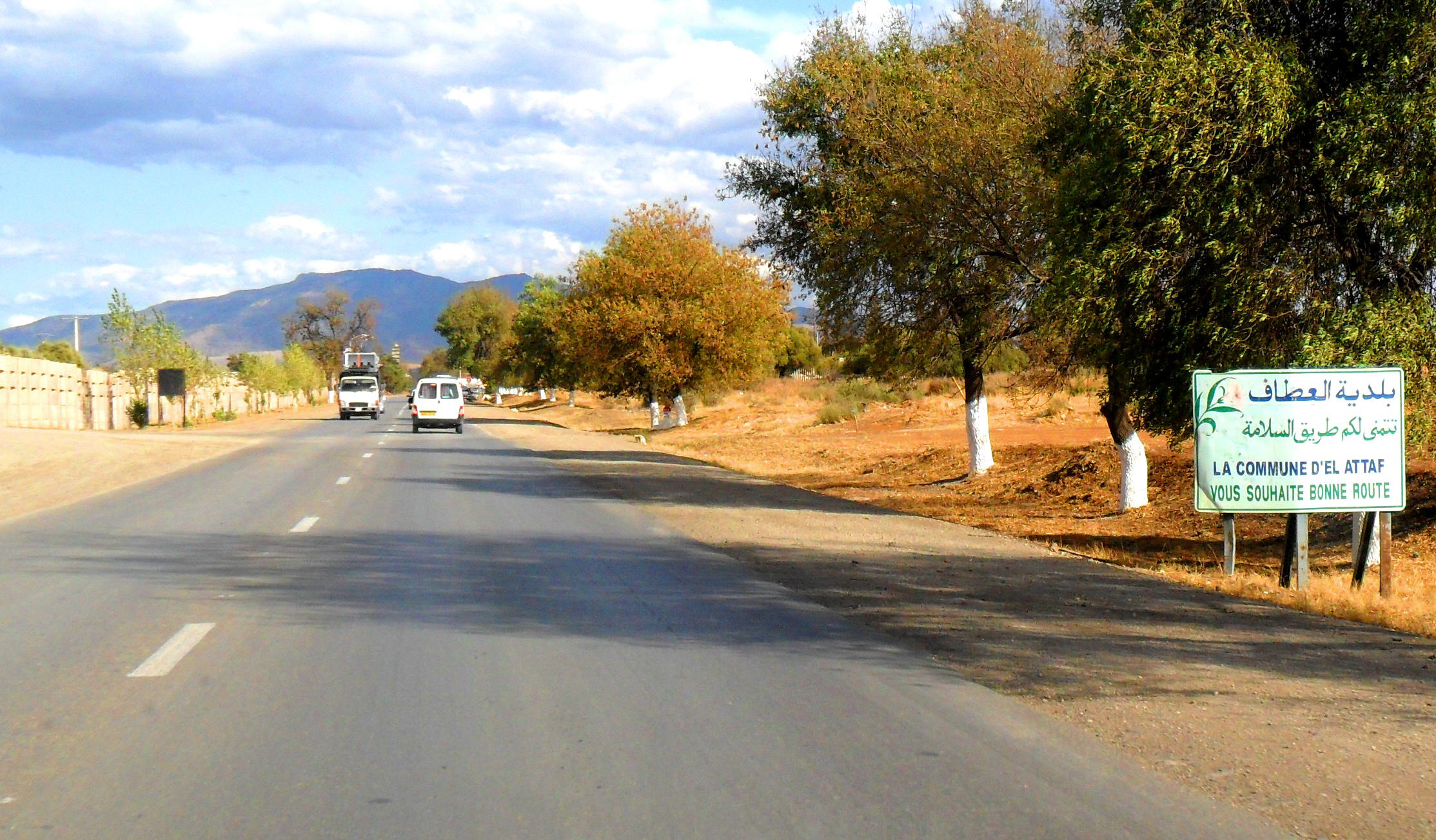
- Interactive map of El Attaf
- Country: Algeria
- Province: Aïn Defla

Population (2008)
  - Total: 57,737
- Time zone: UTC+1 (West Africa Time)

El Attaf is a town in northern Algeria, located in the wilaya (province) of Aïn Defla.
