= Khemis Miliana =

Khemis Miliana خميس مليانة
- City and Commune
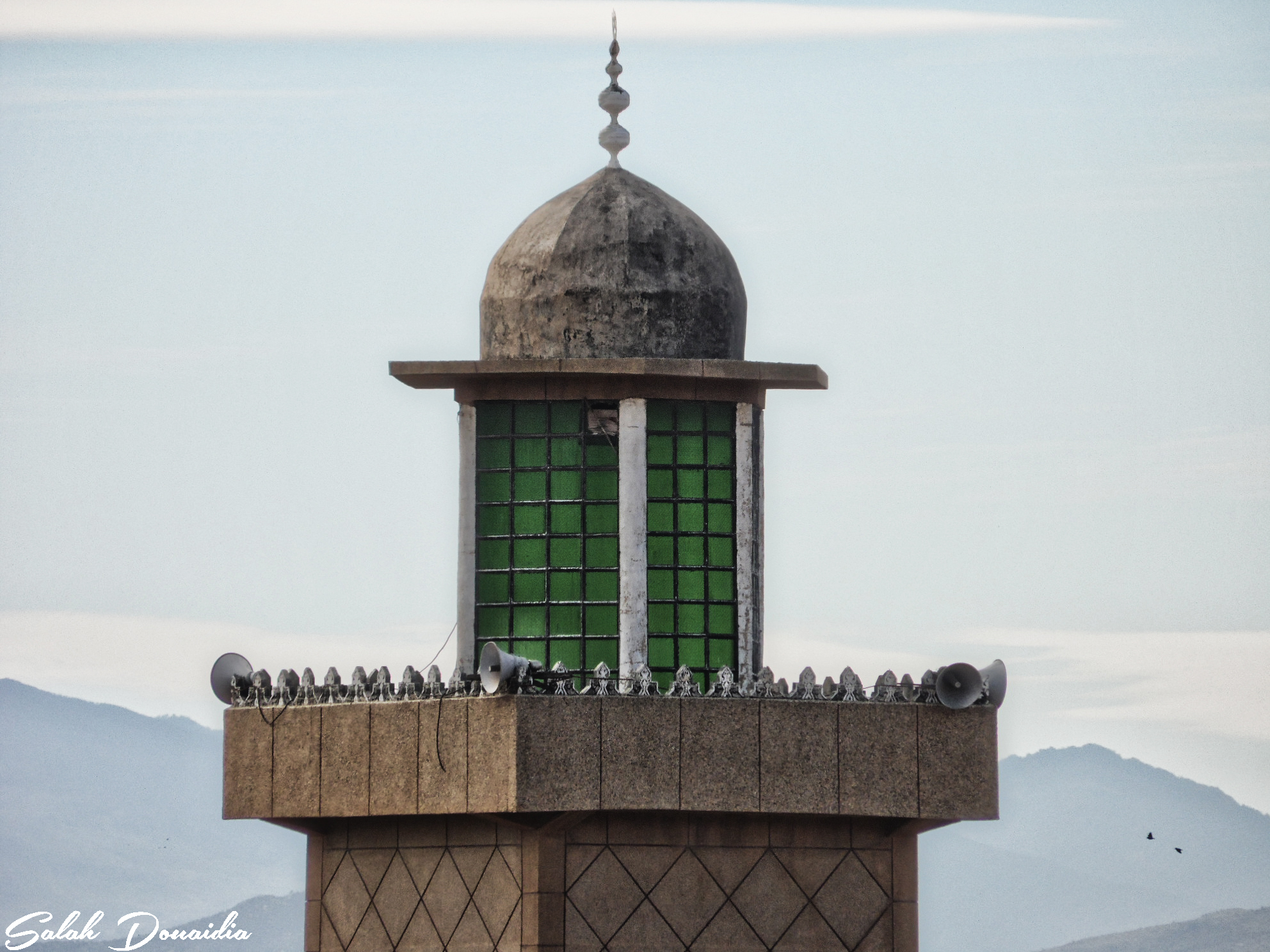
- Nickname: ⵅⵎⵉⵙ ⵎⴻⵍⵢⴰⵏⴰ
- Motto: Khemis Miliana

- Location within Algeria
- Coordinates: 36.26°N 2.20°E
- Country: Algeria
- Province: Aïn Defla Province
- District: Khemis Miliana District

Population (2023)
  - City and Commune: 210,000
  - Metro: 200,000
- Time zone: UTC+1 (West Africa Time)

Khemis Miliana (Arabic: خميس مليانة) is a town in northern Algeria of around 210,000 inhabitants. It is a university town located 120 kilometers west of Algiers. It was known as Malliana in Roman times, then Affreville during the French colonial era. It should not be confused with the smaller city of Miliana nearby.

The Diocese of Malliana is a titular see of the Roman Catholic Church of which Khemis Miliana was the episcopal seat.

== Geography ==
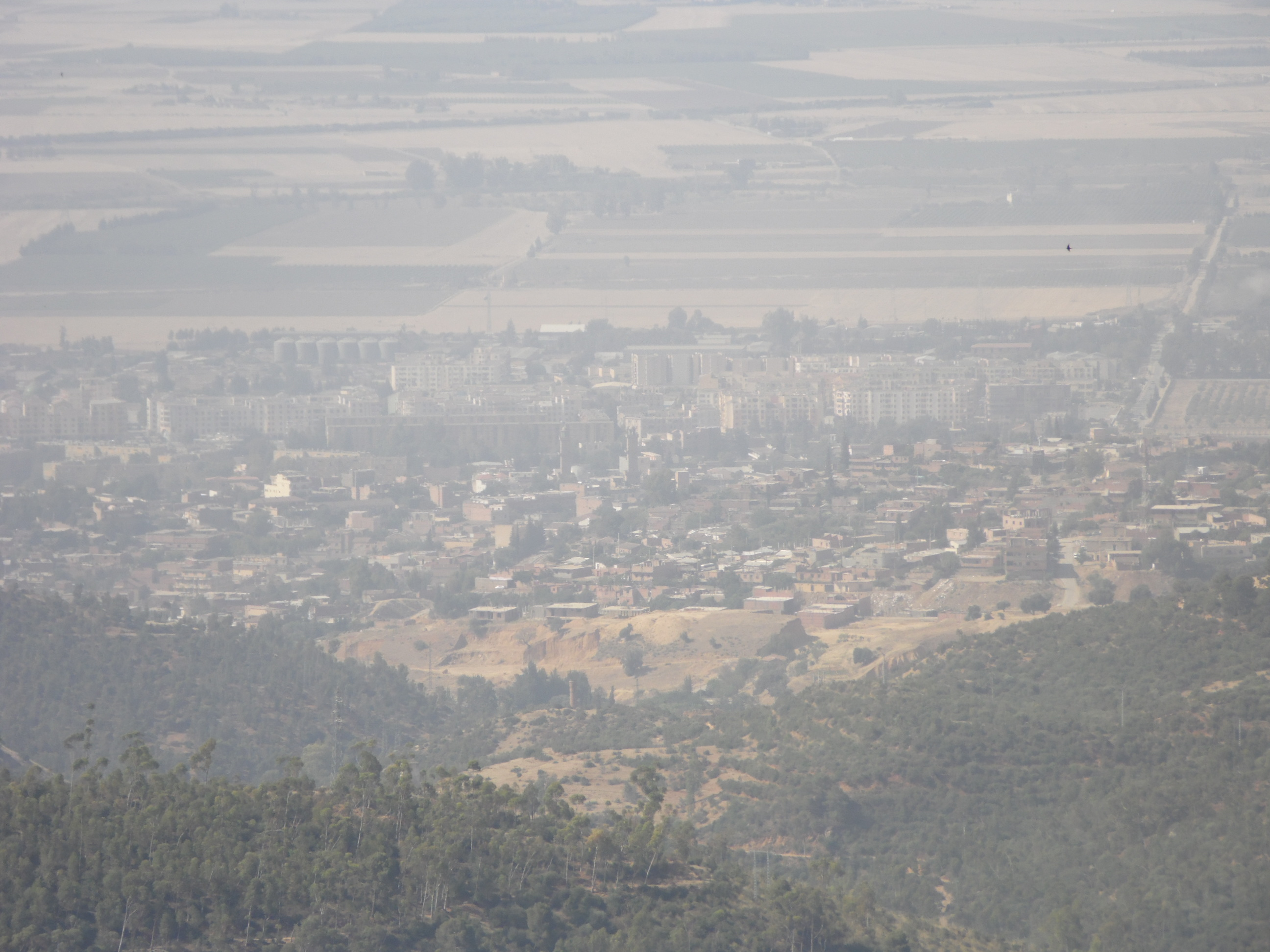
Khemis Miliana 2015

Khemis-Miliana has an important geostrategic location. It is crossed by the RN 4 and the East–West Highway. A new highway will link the town of Khemis-Miliana and Berrouaghia with Bordj Bouarreridj in eastern Algeria. This project will alleviate the pressure of the Algiers and Mitija highways.

== History ==
During the Roman Empire there was a Roman town called Malliana, located near Malliana.

In 1848, the French government decided to give this hamlet, the name of Affreville, named after Monsignor Denis Auguste Affre Archbishop of Paris, who died on the barricades. In 1872, the village became a town. In 1948 had a population of 12,061 inhabitants (2082 of whom were Europeans).

Khemis-Miliana took its current name in 1963, the year the city hosted the first international fair in Algeria.

== Notable people ==
- M'Hamed Bougara, independence activist of the Algerian War, commander of the Wilaya IV, was born there.
- Mohamed Gherainia, said "Prince", a French rifleman who died in Slobozia (now Romania) during the First World War, was born here.

== Diocese of Malliana ==
The Diocese of Malliana (Latin: Dioecesis Mallianensis) is a diocese of the Roman Catholic Church in the Roman province of Mauretania Caesariensis. The current bishop is Bernd Uhl Joachim.

Known bishops

- Vittore and Nestorius (Donatism) at the Council of Carthage (411), which saw gathered Donatists and Catholic bishops.
- Patera attended the Council of Carthage (484) by Vandal king Huneric, after which he was exiled.
- Bruno Torpigliani (Archbishop: 1 September 1964 – 2 May 1995), Apostolic Nuncio of the Holy See.
- Eric Chaplain (12 July 1996 – 11 January 2001), Auxiliary Bishop of Paris.
- Bernd Joachim Uhl (since 29 March 2001), Auxiliary Bishop of Freiburg im Breisgau.
