= Barbouche =

Coordinates: 36°06′N 2°29′E

- Interactive map of Barbouche
- Country: Algeria
- Province: Aïn Defla
- Time zone: UTC+1 (West Africa Time)

Barbouche is a town in northern Algeria less than 100 km from the Mediterranean Sea. At the center of the town is a mosque. The town is next to a lake, the Barrage de Ghrib, which features a campground. Inside and nearby the town features natural landscape views and many hiking areas.
