= Oued Chorfa =

Coordinates: 36°12′N 2°31′E

- Interactive map of Oued Chorfa
- Country: Algeria
- Province: Aïn Defla
- Time zone: UTC+1 (West Africa Time)

Oued Chorfa is a coastal town in northern Algeria.
