= Tiberkanine =

Coordinates: 36°10′28″N 1°37′38″E

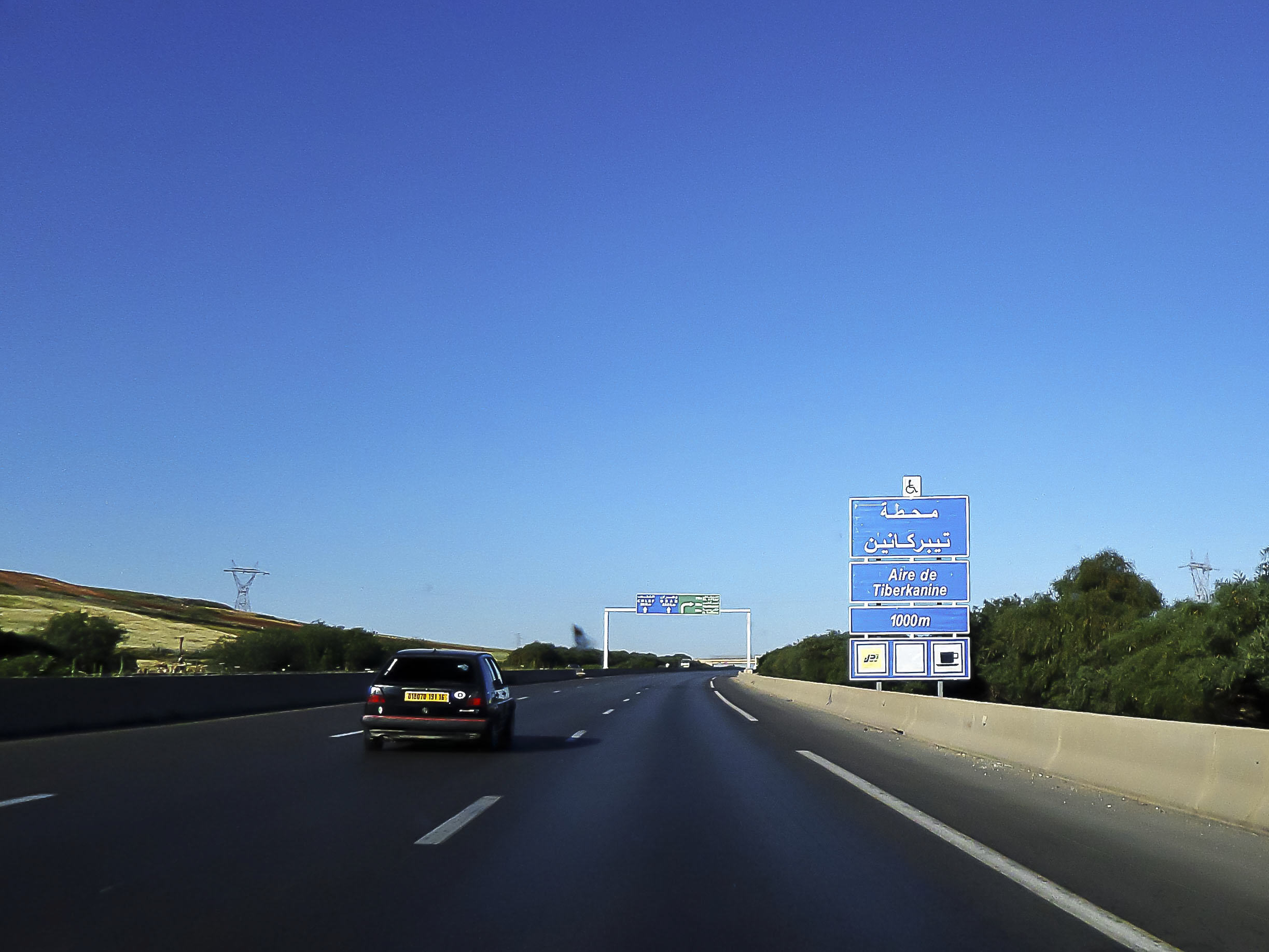
- A1 road approaching Tiberkanine
- Interactive map of Tiberkanine
- Country: Algeria
- Province: Aïn Defla
- Time zone: UTC+1 (West Africa Time)

Tiberkanine is a town and commune in northern Algeria, located in the western part of Aïn Defla Province, close to the border with Chlef Province.
