= Bathia =

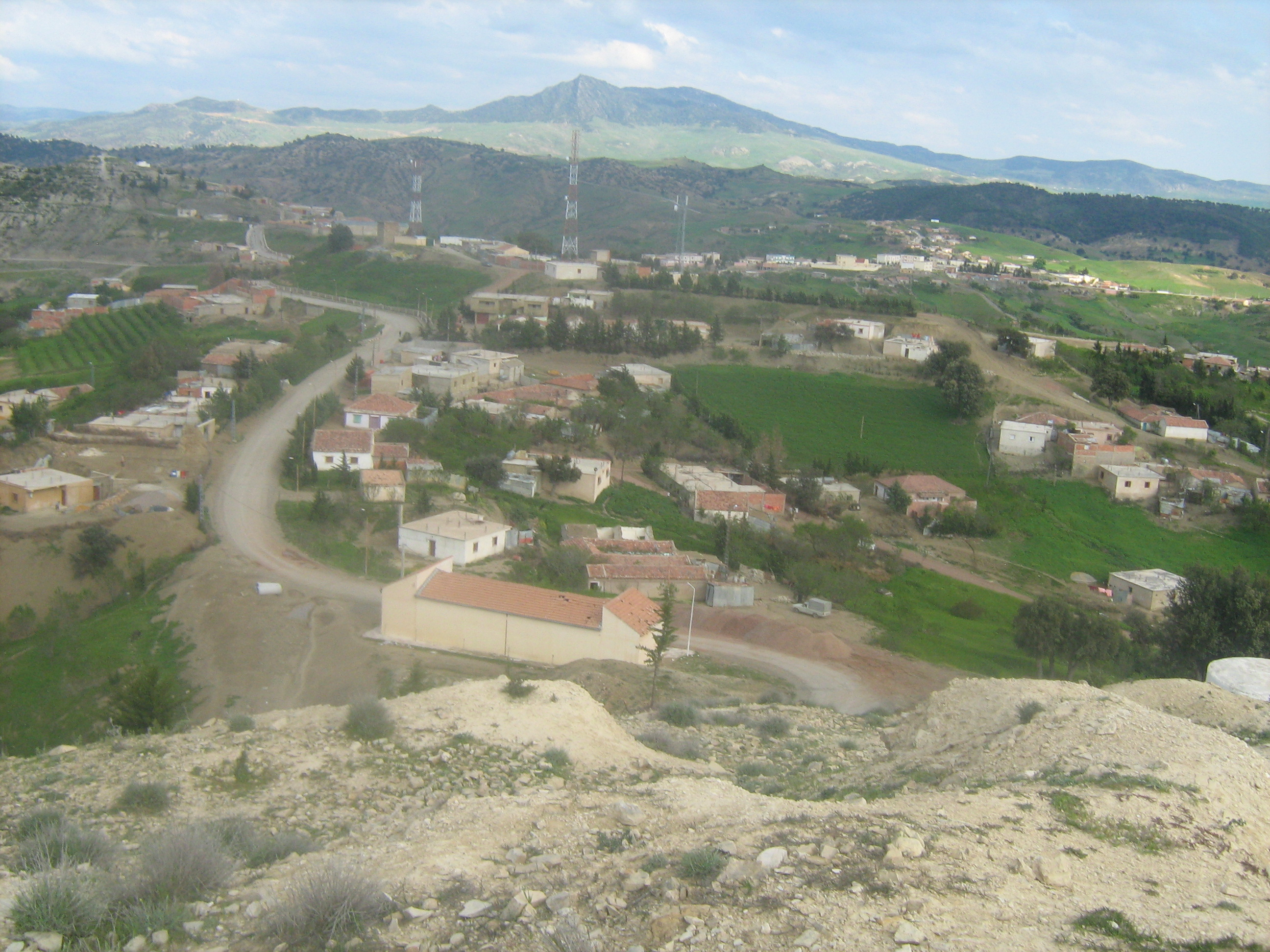

- Location within Algeria
- Country: Algeria
- Province: Aïn Defla
- Time zone: UTC+1 (West Africa Time)

Bathia is a municipality and commune in Aïn Defla Province, Algeria.
