= Bordj Emir Khaled =

Coordinates: 36.1222°N 2.2056°E

Bordj Emir Khaled Chikh
- Interactive map of Bordj Emir Khaled Chikh
- Country: Algeria
- Province: Aïn Defla
- Time zone: UTC+1 (West Africa Time)

Bordj Emir Khaled Chikh is a town in northern Algeria.
