= Mohamed Belhocine =

Algerian professor of medicine and epidemiologist

Professor

Personal details
- Born: April 9, 1951 (age 75) Tala Allam, Tizi Ouzou, Tizi Ouzou Province, Algeria
Mohamed Belhocine
- Known for: Head of the investigation and monitoring unit for epidemiological surveys
- Awards: Order of the Republic (Tunisia); Ordre national du Mérite (France); Medal of the Nation's Gratitude (UN)
- Fields: Internal medicine; Epidemiology
- Workplaces: Ministry of Health, Population and Hospital Reform; World Health Organization; United Nations Development Programme

Mohamed Belhocine (Arabic: محمد بلحسين; born 9 April 1951 in Tizi Ouzou) is an Algerian medical scientist and professor of internal medicine and epidemiology.

== Training ==
After primary studies in Sidi Lakhdar (formerly known as Lavarande, Aïn Defla Province) and secondary studies at the Lycée Mustapha Ferroukhi in Miliana, Belhocine obtained his Baccalaureate in 1970. He continued his university studies in medicine at the University of Algiers, where he obtained his medical graduation diploma in March 1976.

He was admitted to the medical residency at the Faculty of Medicine of Algiers and joined the specialty of internal medicine, which he pursued in the hospitals of Beni Messous and Birtraria. He obtained his diploma in Special Medical Studies in December 1979.

After two years of military service in the Central Hospital of Instruction of the Algerian Army, he joined the hospital of Beni Messous as the Assistant Master in 1982. At the end of 1984, he prepared a thesis of Docent about the prevalence of asthma in the population of Chéraga District, which was the first national epidemiological survey on a representative sample of the population of a Daïra. He defended this thesis in 1986 and was appointed as a Doctor of Medical Sciences.

In 1994, he was appointed as the Professor of Medicine (Clinical professor).

In addition to his course in internal medicine, Belhocine enrolled in 1983-84 and 1986 at the University of Paris VI to study, from a distance, statistics applied to clinical research, followed by epidemiology.

== Career in Algeria ==
A practitioner and teacher since 1977, Belhocine was in charge of launching the new allied health professions (Paramedic) School of Beni Messous in 1978, in collaboration with Hussein Dey, the only existing such school in Algiers at the time. He then organized a recruitment competition for candidates for various paramedical corps and assembled a list of teachers chosen from among the medical and paramedical staff of the CHU. The school of Beni Messous made it possible to relieve the lack of paramedical personnel at the teaching hospital (CHU) and beyond.

Belhocine was the Assistant Teacher at CHU Algiers Ouest from 1982 to 1990, first at Beni Messous Hospital, then at Zéralda Hospital. From 1990 to 1994, he was Docent in the internal medicine departments, first at the hospital in Douéra, then in Zéralda. He belongs to the national expert committee for the nomenclature of medicines. He is also an expert with the Faculty of Medicine of Algiers and the Directorate of Training and Research at the Ministry of Health.

He is a teacher and responsible for the educational unit of health structures. In July 1996, he was appointed Head Professor of the Internal Medicine Service at the Zéralda University Hospital.

In September 1994, he joined the Ministry of Health, Population, and Hospital Reform as Director of Planning, a position he held until July 1996.

== World Health Organization ==
In February 1997, Belhocine was recruited by the regional office of the World Health Organization (WHO) as a regional advisor for clinical and laboratory technologies and quality of care, with the mission of advocating for dissemination and implementation of WHO resolutions on quality of care and quality assurance in public health laboratories. He also co-wrote a guide for donating medical equipment.

In September 1998, he was appointed director of the Division of Non-communicable Diseases (DNC) within the WHO Regional Office for Africa. The purpose of this division is to bring non-communicable diseases (NCDs) out of the shadows. Among the division's credits are advocacy for healthy lifestyles, a global survey on smoking among young people in 22 African countries, and an active participation of the African group in discussions for the WHO Framework Convention on Tobacco Control.

From September 2003 to October 2006, Belhocine was the WHO Representative in Nigeria. In this capacity, he supervised and managed a team of over 500 people, deployed in the 36 states of the Federation and the Federal Capital Territory, with a biennial budget of over $250 million. In this period, he notably contributed to the health sector reform process. It promoted and supported efforts to generate reliable data in various fields: national health accounts; investigation of the effectiveness of antimalarial drugs; economic burden of malaria; mapping of service availability; assessment of antiretroviral treatment sites; sentinel survey on HIV/AIDS; and drug prices.

Belhocine was personally involved in supporting the Federal Ministry of Health, in close collaboration with other partners, for resolving the controversy over the oral polio vaccine, which had started in August 2003 and had resulted in the roll-back of a serious polio eradication program in northern Nigeria and neighboring countries. The controversy ended in September 2004 with resumption of vaccinations in areas that previously had rejected it.

These vaccination campaigns benefited from the establishment of a transparent, efficient mechanism for using donor funds for polio eradication operations.

Belhocine supported the preparation of a national response plan for the health sector in the event of an influenza A virus subtype H5N1 epidemic. When an avian influenza epidemic broke out in poultry in Nigeria, he chaired the steering committee that coordinated United Nations assistance in the government response.

In November 2006, Belhocine was reassigned to Tanzania as the WHO representative. In addition to supporting the Ministry of Health and Social Welfare (MSBS) for developing and updating health policies and programs, his team had solid partnerships with other agencies of the United Nations system in areas of common interest, including UNDP, UNICEF, UNFPA, and UNAIDS. It contributes to all activities of the United Nations country team, within the framework of Reform of the United Nations System, and involving the WHO office in dialogue on development policy. It supported the response to the Rift Valley fever epidemic both through the MSBS and the joint United Nations team, in close collaboration with other partners such as Food and Agriculture Organization (FAO) and the Centers for Disease Control and Prevention (CDC).

== United Nations Development Programme ==
Belhocine became the Resident Coordinator (RC) of the United Nations System in Tunisia and the Resident Representative of the United Nations Development Programme (UNDP) in January 2009. He held this position until his retirement on 30 April 2013. He supervised a team of 70 and coordinated the entire United Nations team (around 250 staff members). He was also designated as the United Nations Security Officer in Tunisia.

In January 2011 (marked by the Tunisian revolution), he initiated a revision of the United Nations cooperation strategy to adjust the actions of the specialized agencies to the new transitional situation, in light of the country's political and social evolution.

In April 2013, Belhocine asserted his pension rights at the age of 62.

== Consultant ==
Since 2013, Belhocine has been called upon occasionally for national and international consultations in the field of public health and development.

Among these consultations, the UNDP, in agreement with the Ministry of Foreign Affairs, hired him in February 2015. This involved organizing and animating 13 workshops to gather different sectors and the United Nations System in order to identify the strategic axes of cooperation between the Algerian government and the United Nations System for 2016 to 2019. At the end of these workshops, he drew up the document on the Algeria-SNU Strategic Cooperation Framework for 2016-2019 (commonly called UNDAF).

=== Ebola ===
Belhocine, among others, was recruited again by the WHO from June 2015 until February 2016 to revitalize the local actions of the WHO in the context of fighting the Ebola virus epidemic.

He managed a multidisciplinary team of around 700 people with a budget of more than $52 million, while ensuring maintenance of the WHO-Guinea cooperation portfolio.

Arriving in Guinea on 25 June, the country declared about fifty cases per month. On 29 December 2015, on behalf of the WHO, Belhocine officially declared the end of the Ebola epidemic in Guinea.

=== COVID-19 ===
In 2020, with the arrival of the COVID-19 pandemic in Algeria, Belhocine was writing, in collaboration with colleagues, a note contributing to the national response.

This note was set to be published in the national press. He was then called to join the Scientific Committee in charge of monitoring the epidemic with the Ministry of Health, Population and Hospital Reform.

Belhocine was installed on Wednesday, 10 June 2020 as the president of the operational unit responsible for monitoring epidemiological investigations as part of the measures taken by public authorities to face the risks of the spread of COVID-19 in Algeria.

== Awards ==
During his career, Mohamed Belhocine has received various distinctions:

=== 2013 ===
- Medal of Grand Officer of the Order of the Republic of Tunisia, awarded by the President of the Republic of Tunisia, Moncef Marzouki, "in recognition of the action taken to strengthen the ties of friendship and cooperation between the Republic of Tunisia and the United Nations".
- Medal of the Tunisian Revolution, awarded by the Head of the Tunisian Government, Ali Laarayedh.

=== 2012 ===
- Medal of Officer of the Ordre national du Mérite of the French Republic, awarded by the Ambassador of France in Tunis, on behalf of the President of the French Republic, in recognition of the work carried out as a development practitioner, doctor, and representative of the UNDP, of Algerian nationality.
- Julia V. Taft Prize: This prize is awarded each year by a jury composed of eminent private citizens and development experts, formerly constituting the United States Committee for the UNDP, to a UNDP Country Office which has demonstrated "the impact of teamwork to build a more democratic, prosperous, peaceful, and secure world, in a particularly difficult position".

=== 2010 ===
- Medal of Recognition for Services Rendered to Public Health in Africa from 1997 to 2008, awarded by the WHO Regional Director, Office for Africa.

== See also ==
- Ministry of Health, Population and Hospital Reform
- Health in Algeria
- World Health Organization
- United Nations Development Programme
- COVID-19 pandemic in Algeria

== Bibliography ==
- Algerian bibliography, Numbers 51-53. Algiers: Bibliothèque Nationale. 1990. p. 29;65.
- Belhocine, Mohamed; Aït-Khaled, Nadia (1991). Prévalence de l'asthme dans une région d'Algérie. pp. 97–100. Archived from the original on 2023-04-20.
- Belhocine, Mohamed; Aït-Khaled, Nadia; Mahi-Taright, Samia (1995). La prise en charge des asthmatiques. Evaluation d'une intervention de santé au niveau d'un secteur sanitaire d'Algérie. pp. 67–76.
- Zimbabwe News, Volume 31, Numéros 2 à 9. Harare: Central Bureau of Information of the Zimbabwe African National Union. 2000. p. 1.
- The World Health Report 2001: Mental Health : New Understanding, New Hope. World Health Organization. 2001. p. 170. ISBN 9789241562010.
- Belhocine, Mohamed; Aït-Khaled, Nadia; Mahi-Taright, Samia (2004). "Can we improve the management of chronic obstructive respiratory disease? The example of asthma in adults". The International Journal of Tuberculosis and Lung Disease. 8 (7): 873–881. PMID 15260280.
- Civil Society Perspectives on TB Policy in Bangladesh, Brazil, Nigeria, Tanzania, and Thailand. Open Society Institute. 2006. p. 291. ISBN 9781891385629.
