= Aïn Soltane, Aïn Defla =

Coordinates: 36°07′59″N 4°44′00″E

Aïn Soltane
- Commune and town
- Interactive map of Aïn Soltane
- Country: Algeria
- Province: Aïn Defla Province
- Time zone: UTC+1 (CET)

Aïn Soltane is a town and commune of Aïn Defla Province, Algeria.
