= El Maine =

Coordinates: 36°03′03″N 1°45′30″E

- Interactive map of El Maine
- Country: Algeria
- Province: Aïn Defla
- Time zone: UTC+1 (West Africa Time)

El Maine is a town in northern Algeria. It encompasses a number of smaller localities, including Bou Zefour, Djouahra, El Djouahra, and Sidi Kharmesh.
