= El Abadia =

Coordinates: 36°16′N 1°41′E

- Interactive map of El Abadia
- Country: Algeria
- Province: Aïn Defla
- District: El Abadia

Population (2008)
  - Total: 27,185
- Time zone: UTC+1 (West Africa Time)

El Abadia is a town in northern Algeria.
