= Tarik Ibn Ziad =

Coordinates: 36°00′N 2°09′E

- Interactive map of Tarik Ibn Ziad
- Country: Algeria
- Province: Aïn Defla
- Time zone: UTC+1 (West Africa Time)

Tarik Ibn Ziad is a town in northern Algeria.
