= Aïn Bouyahia =

Aïn Bouyahia عين بويحى
- Commune and town
- Interactive map of Aïn Bouyahia
- Country: Algeria
- Province: Aïn Defla

Area
  - Total: 137 km^{2} (53 sq mi)

Population (2008)
  - Total: 16,213
  - Density: 118.3/km^{2} (306/sq mi)
- Time zone: UTC+1 (CET)

Aïn Bouyahia (Arabic: عين بويحية) is a commune and town located in Aïn Defla Province, northern Algeria. It is one of the administrative divisions within the country’s wilayas (provinces). Just like many other communes in Algeria, Aïn Bouyahia could be said to be both an urban settlement and a local administrative unit.

== Geography ==
The commune covers a total area of about 137 km^{2} (53 sq mi). It is part of the north-central region of Algeria, characterized by a Mediterranean climate and semi-rural settlement patterns.

== Population ==
According to the Office National des Statistiques of Algeria, the population of Aïn Bouyahia increased from 13,920 in the 1998 census to 16,213 in the 2008 census, representing an average annual growth rate of about 1.6%.

The 2008 census also recorded the following demographic details:

- Males: 8,239 (49.2%)
- Females: 7,974 (50.8%)
- Children (0–14 years): 31.3%
- Working age (15–64 years): 63.9%
- Elderly (65 years and above): 4.9%

Population distribution was recorded as:

- Main locality: 31.4%
- Other settlements: 24.5%
- Scattered dwellings: 44.1%

== Economy ==
The local economy of Aïn Bouyahia is primarily agricultural, with residents engaged in crop farming, livestock rearing, and small-scale trading that supports surrounding rural communities.

== See also ==
- Communes of Algeria
- Aïn Defla Province
