= Bellas, Aïn Defla =

Coordinates: 35.98210°N 1.85120°E

Bellas
- Interactive map of Bellas
- Country: Algeria
- Province: Aïn Defla
- Time zone: UTC+1 (West Africa Time)

Bellas is a town in northern Algeria.
