= Ben Allal, Aïn Defla =

Coordinates: 36°18′39.6″N 2°09′50.4″E

Ben Allal, Algeria
- Interactive map of Ben Allal, Algeria
- Country: Algeria
- Province: Aïn Defla
- Time zone: UTC+1 (West Africa Time)

Ben Allal, Algeria is a town in northern Algeria.
