= Oued Djemaa =

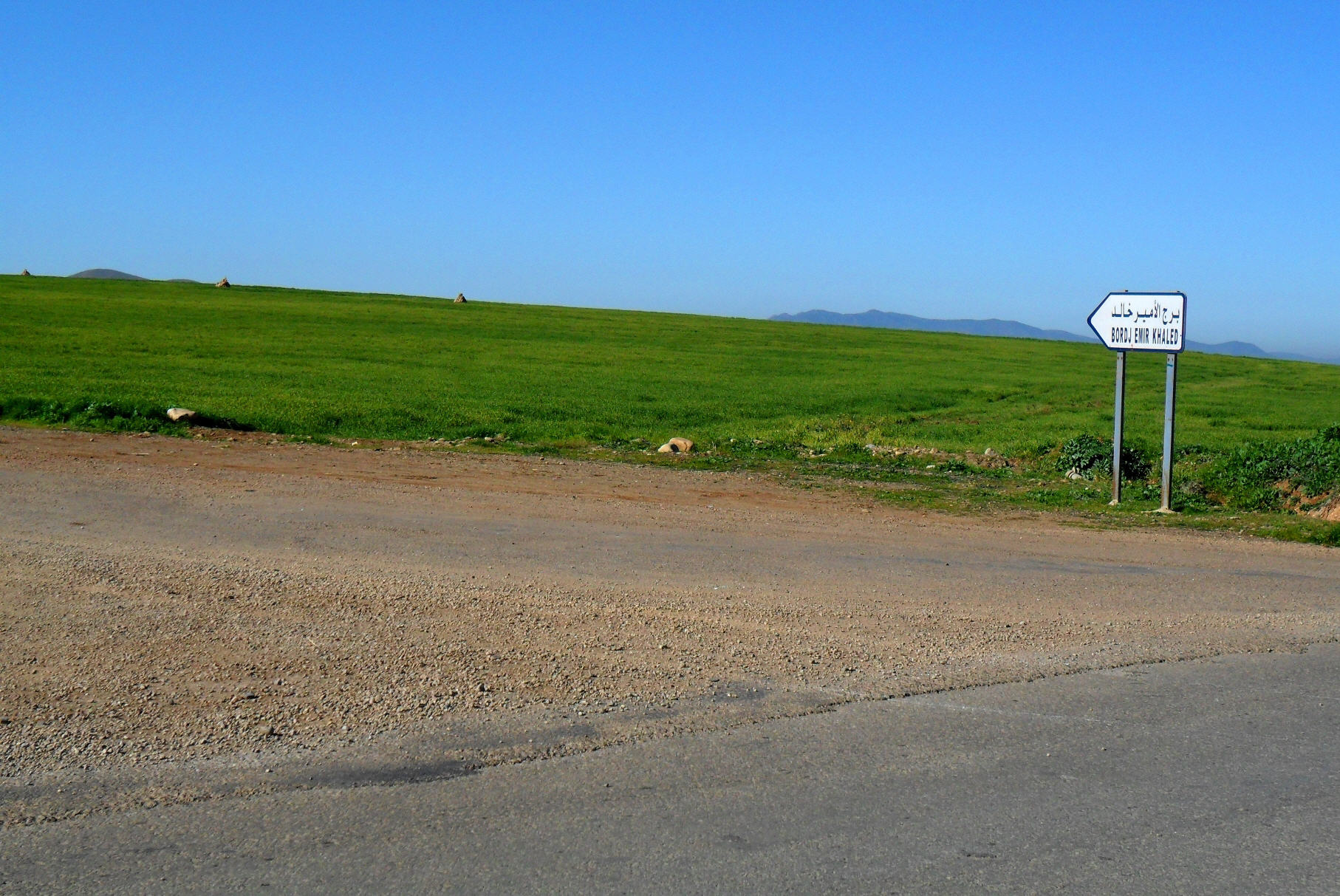

- Location within Algeria
- Country: Algeria
- Province: Relizane Province
- Time zone: UTC+1 (West Africa Time)

Oued Djemaa (Arabic: وادي الجمعة)is a town in Relizane Province, Algeria.
