= Djelida =

Coordinates: 36°12′N 2°05′E

- Interactive map of Djelida
- Country: Algeria
- Province: Aïn Defla
- Time zone: UTC+1 (West Africa Time)

Djelida is a town in northern Algeria.
