= Rouina =

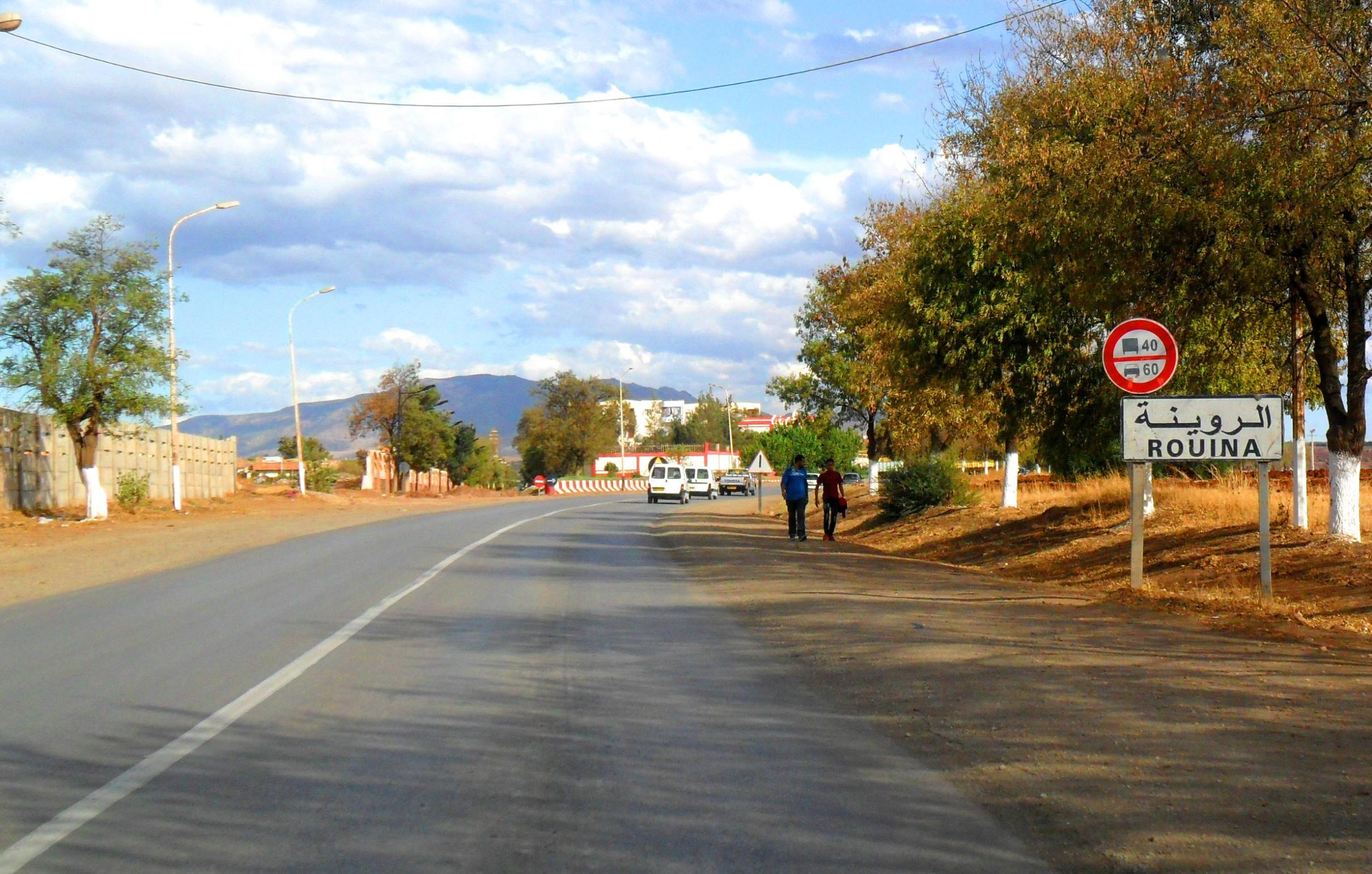

- Location within Algeria
- Country: Algeria
- Province: Aïn Defla
- Time zone: UTC+1 (West Africa Time)

Rouina is a town in northern Algeria.
