= Sidi Lakhdar =

- city
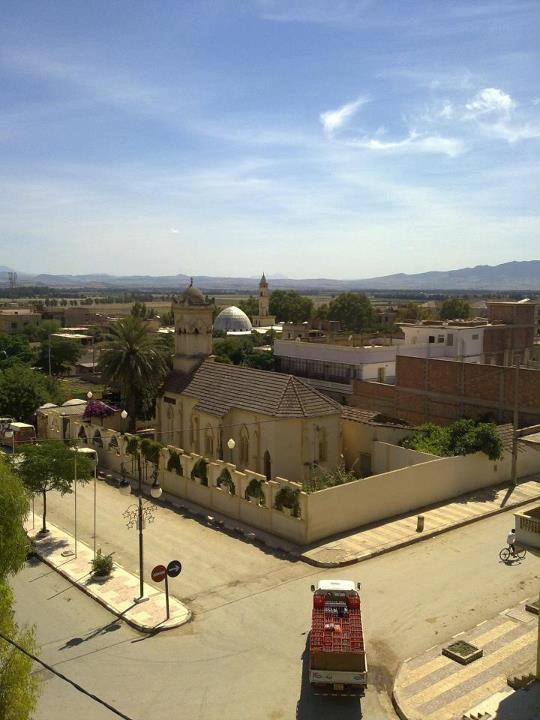

- Location within Algeria
- Coordinates: 36°15′55″N 2°09′42″E
- Country: Algeria
- Province: Aïn Defla Province

Area
  - Total: 39 km^{2} (15 sq mi)

Population (2023)
  - Total: 28,361
- Time zone: UTC+1 (West Africa Time)

Sidi Lakhdar is an Algerian commune in the Aïn Defla Province, approximately 125 km west of the capital, Algiers. During the period of French colonization, it was called Lavarande. In 2023, it had a population of 28361.
