= Aïn Defla =

Aïn Defla عين الدفلى
- Municipality
- Commune of Aïn Defla
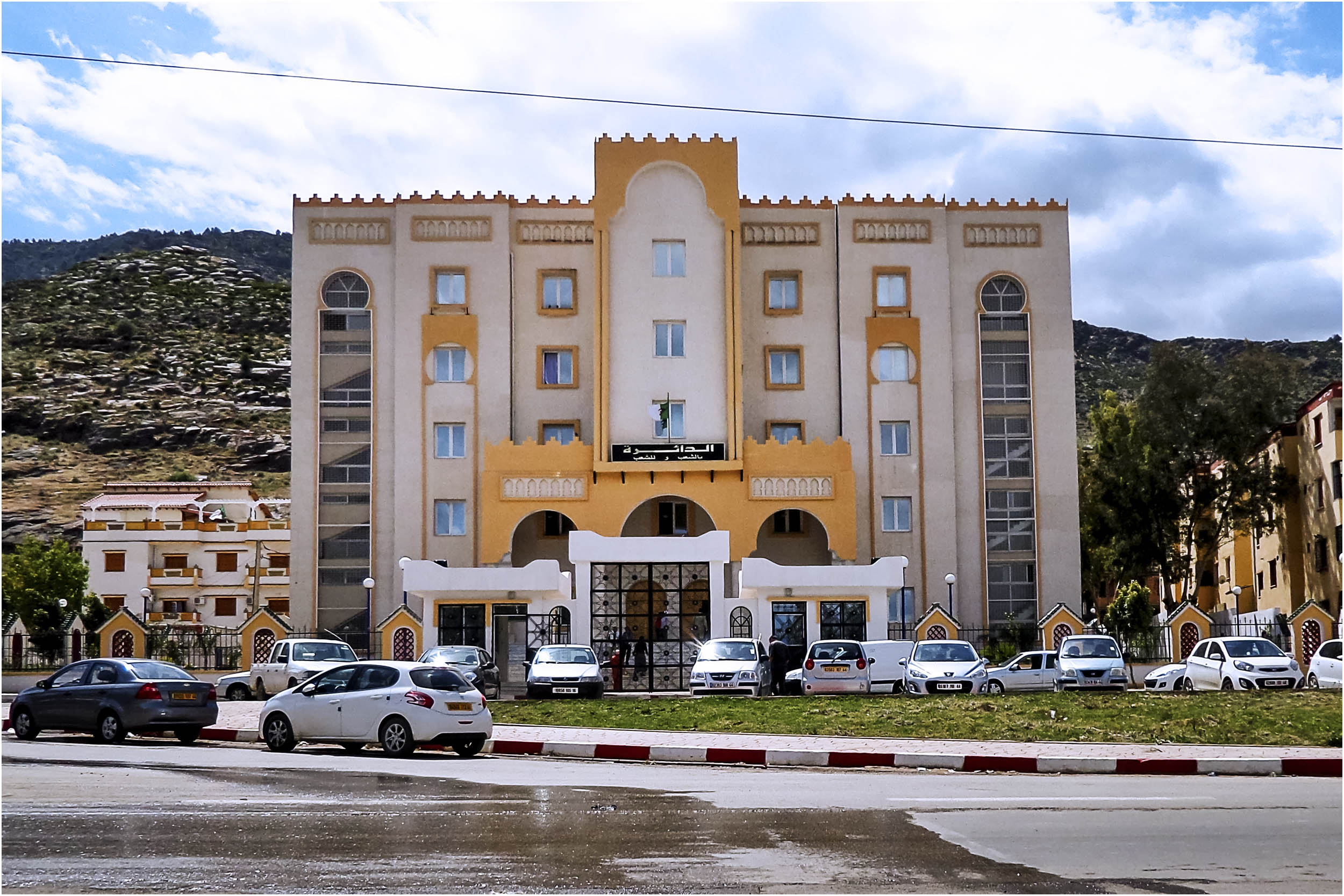

- Location of Aïn Delfa within Aïn Delfa Province

- Location of Aïn Defla within Algeria
- Coordinates: 36.2652°N 1.9703°E
- Country: Algeria
- Province: Aïn Defla (seat)
- District: Aïn Defla (coextensive)

Government
  - PMA Seats: 11
- Elevation: 980 m (3,220 ft)

Population (2008)
  - Total: 65,453
- Time zone: UTC+01 (CET)
- Postal code: 44000
- ONS code: 4401
- Climate: Csa

Aïn Defla (Arabic: عين الدفلى, lit. 'oleander spring') is the capital city of Aïn Defla Province, Algeria. It is also a commune.

== History ==
In Roman times the city was called Oppidum Novum. The vestiges of the Oppidum Novum are still visible.

The current city was founded in the 20th century by a soldier named youcef asnofg of the rank of agha, with the idea of bringing together the indigenous populations from the villages of the region.

This region of uneven terrain, which was considered unstable and dangerous by the French during the Algerian War, had for this reason been declared a forbidden zone.

In the 1990s, the same region was a stronghold of the Armed Islamic Group (GIA). There was fighting between militants and government troops in January 2021.

== Geography ==
=== Climate ===
Climate data for Aïn Defla
| Month | Jan | Feb | Mar | Apr | May | Jun | Jul | Aug | Sep | Oct | Nov | Dec | Year |
|---|---|---|---|---|---|---|---|---|---|---|---|---|---|
| Mean daily maximum °C (°F) | 13.5 (56.3) | 14.2 (57.6) | 17.7 (63.9) | 20.8 (69.4) | 24.7 (76.5) | 30.3 (86.5) | 34.6 (94.3) | 34.3 (93.7) | 29.2 (84.6) | 25.0 (77.0) | 17.6 (63.7) | 14.5 (58.1) | 23.0 (73.5) |
| Daily mean °C (°F) | 8.5 (47.3) | 9.0 (48.2) | 12.0 (53.6) | 14.8 (58.6) | 18.6 (65.5) | 23.5 (74.3) | 27.3 (81.1) | 27.1 (80.8) | 22.8 (73.0) | 19.0 (66.2) | 12.7 (54.9) | 9.6 (49.3) | 17.1 (62.7) |
| Mean daily minimum °C (°F) | 4.1 (39.4) | 4.3 (39.7) | 6.9 (44.4) | 9.3 (48.7) | 12.7 (54.9) | 16.8 (62.2) | 20.3 (68.5) | 20.7 (69.3) | 17.4 (63.3) | 13.8 (56.8) | 8.5 (47.3) | 5.6 (42.1) | 11.7 (53.1) |
| Average precipitation mm (inches) | 66 (2.6) | 60 (2.4) | 67 (2.6) | 62 (2.4) | 48 (1.9) | 10 (0.4) | 4 (0.2) | 10 (0.4) | 32 (1.3) | 42 (1.7) | 68 (2.7) | 58 (2.3) | 527 (20.9) |
| Average precipitation days | 7 | 7 | 7 | 6 | 5 | 2 | 1 | 2 | 4 | 5 | 7 | 7 | 60 |
| Average relative humidity (%) | 75 | 73 | 68 | 64 | 60 | 50 | 46 | 45 | 58 | 62 | 72 | 75 | 62 |
Source: Climate data.org(1991-2021)
