= Mohamed Hassaïne =

Algerian journalist (1945–1994)

- محمد حساين
- Born: 5 January 1945; Beni Amrane, Algeria
- Died: 28 February 1994 (aged 49); Larbatache, Algeria
- Education: Journalism
- Occupations: Journalist; Syndicalist; Militant
- Writing career
- Language: Arabic, Berber, French
- Years active: 1970–1994
- Notable work: Alger républicain
- Literary movement: Socialist Vanguard Party (PAGS)

Mohamed Hassaïne (Arabic: محمد حساين) (born in Beni Amrane on 5 January 1945, and died in Larbatache on 28 February 1994) was an Algerian journalist.

== Early life ==
Hassaïne was born in 1945 in the village of Azela within the Thénia District in the lower Kabylia region of Algeria, east of the Khachna Massif and south-east of the town of Boumerdès.

After primary and intermediate studies in Beni Amrane, Hassaïne continued his secondary education at a high school in Algiers, where he obtained the diploma of higher technician in agriculture, and began his professional career by working in the agricultural sub-directorate of Khemis El Khechna under the agricultural directorate of the Boumerdès Province.

== Socialist Vanguard Party ==
Hassaïne joined as a militant within the Socialist Vanguard Party (PAGS), and he knew how to translate the main political principles of the Algerian left into simple militant actions centered on taking care of the daily concerns of the humble people of his locality and province in lower Kabylia.

Because of his communist political convictions and his commitment to the working and salaried masses, he had been threatened by the salafists since 1990, but he had not left Algeria to go into exile abroad.

He could not be separated from family and friends, as death threats escalated in the last months of his life at the end of 1993, but he chose to stay with his pregnant wife.

== Alger Républicain ==
Hassaïne was one of the journalists for the daily Alger Républicain, along with Mohamed Benchicou, Fodil Mezali and Saïd Mekbel, when this press title, founded in 1938, reappeared as a news daily following the events of 1988 October riots.

Thus, for several years, Hassaïne was the correspondent of the militant newspaper Alger Républicain, and his articles were mainly devoted to the problems of the peasantry and the workers' struggles of workers and trade unionists.

He was also responsible for preparing reports to follow in particular union activities at the level of the industrial zone of Rouiba-Reghaïa, one of the largest working-class zones in Algeria, and he also provided coverage of the football matches of several local teams in his province, while covering news items.

== Kidnapping and death ==
Hassaïne was kidnapped during the month of Ramadan on 28 February 1994 around 7:30 am, while leaving his house in Larbatache to go to work, a group of armed terrorists affiliated with Islamist terrorism in Algeria approached him. Subsequently, they forced him to follow them to an unknown place.

He was taken to an area bordering his place of residence where he was assassinated by beheading. The remains of his body were found several days after his disappearance.

== Family ==
Mohamed Hassaïne had a wife and three children.

== Aftermath ==
Repentant terrorists who benefited from the 2005 Algerian national reconciliation then claimed that Hassaïne was assassinated on the very day of his kidnapping. Indeed, his entire body was never found when he was 49. No burial was ever dedicated to him.

The witnesses who had witnessed the kidnapping were terrorized and could not denounce his executioners, but a few years later, testimonies from neighbors but also from repentants reported that Hassaïne was kidnapped by four men from the Armed Islamic Group of Algeria (GIA) who were waiting for him in a vehicle around the corner.

== Commemoration ==
The journalists of the press of the Boumerdès Province organized on 2 May 2009, a tournament in the commune of Boudouaou dedicated to the memory of the journalist Hassaïne, and to commemorate the World Press Freedom Day.

The Boumerdès Province officially honored in October 2013 the memory of Hassaïne as well as four of his colleagues, like Othmane Senadjki, Rabah Hammouche, Mohamed Brara and Lamia Guettaf.

A ceremony of meditation in memory of Hassaïne was organized on Friday 28 February 2014, at 9:00 am in downtown Larbatache in the presence of his wife, children, friends and colleagues, as well as the Manansaouche collective which was associated with this ceremony where a minute of silence was observed in memory of the deceased.

A vibrant tribute was paid on 28 February 2015, to journalist Hassaïne in a ceremony of meditation in his memory in the town of Larbatache where a wreath of flowers was laid at the place of the kidnapping. After the minute of silence in his memory and to all the victims of the terrorist hordes, the speakers retraced his fight for democracy and social justice through his pen and his union and militant actions for the benefit of the working masses.

== See also ==
- List of Algerian assassinated journalists
- List of Algerians
- List of Algerian writers
- List of newspapers in Algeria
- Alger républicain
- Hamas - Originally viewed as a counterbalance to the Palestinian Liberation Organization

== Bibliography ==
- Committee to Protect Journalists (1994). Attacks on the Press in 1994. The Committee. p. 269. ISBN 9780944823149.
- I.P.I. Report: Monthly Bulletin of the International Press Institute, Volume 44. Secretariat of the I.P.I. 1995. p. 9.
- European Cultural Centre (1996). Transeuropéennes, Numéros 8 à 11. Centre européen de la culture. p. 123.
- Human Rights Watch/Middle East, Volume 9. Human Rights Watch/Middle East. 1997. p. 31.
- Brahim Brahimi (1997). Le pouvoir, la presse et les droits de l'homme en Algérie. Editions Marinoor. p. 106. ISBN 9789961720295.
- Algeria: Elections in the Shadow of Violence and Repression: Vol. 9, No. 4. Human Rights Watch. 1997. p. 32.
- M'Hamed Rebah (2002). La presse algérienne: journal d'un défi. Chihab. p. 33;52;227. ISBN 9789961634622.
- Julija Sukys (2007). Silence Is Death: The Life and Work of Tahar Djaout. University of Nebraska Press. p. 33. ISBN 9780803205956.
- Brian Chama (2019). Anti-Corruption Tabloid Journalism in Africa. Springer. p. 62. ISBN 9783030168223.
