= Alger républicain =

Arabic language Algerian newspaper

Alger républicain (Republican Algeria, الجزائر الجمهورية) is an Arabic language Algerian newspaper published in Algeria. It was founded by Pascal Pia.

== History and profile ==
Alger républicain was founded in October 1938, and intermittently published ever since. In its initial phase the paper declared itself as "the honest newspaper of the honest people". It is close to the Algerian communist movement, without having been an official party publication. However, the movement controlled the paper in the past.

The paper was edited by the French-Algerian communist and anti-colonial activist Henri Alleg from 1951, as a major daily newspaper. Despite censorship and confiscation of copies by the French authorities, it had become perhaps the largest daily in Algeria at independence in 1962, having featured a number of prominent writers and journalists, including Albert Camus and Kateb Yacine. Alger républicain was banned in 1965 by the government of Houari Boumédiène, but later refounded by Alleg and others in exile. In 1994, it ceased regular publication, but has since returned under Alleg's editorship, and is now on sale in Algeria again.

== Notable journalists ==
- Mohamed Benchicou
- Ali Dilem
- Mohamed Hassaïne
- Saïd Mekbel
- Fodil Mezali
- Kateb Yacine

== Sources ==
- Hayden, Patrick (9 February 2016). Camus and the Challenge of Political Thought: Between Despair and Hope. Springer. doi:10.1057/9781137525833. ISBN 978-1-137-52583-3.
- Sherman, David (2009). Camus. John Wiley & Sons. ISBN 978-1-4443-0328-5.
