= Tahar Djaout =

Algerian writer (1954–1993)

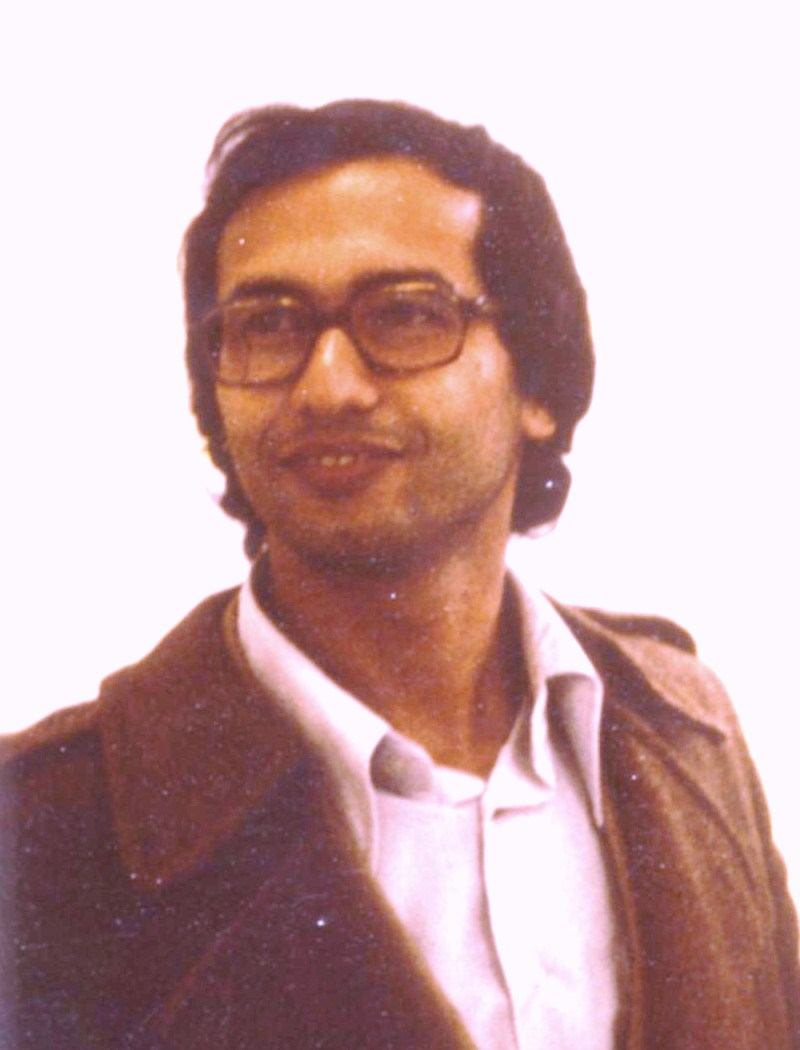
- Djaout in 1980
- Born: 11 January 1954; Oulkhou, French Algeria
- Died: 2 June 1993 (aged 39); Algiers, Algeria
- Cause of death: Assassination
- Occupations: Journalist, poet
- Writing career
- Language: French language

Signature
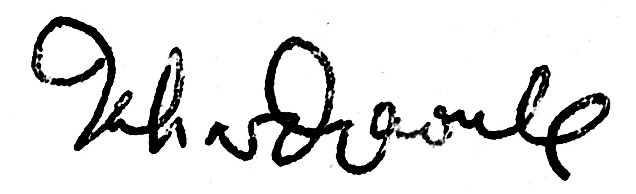

Tahar Djaout (Kabyle: Ṭaher Ǧaɛut, 11 January 1954 – 2 June 1993) was an Algerian journalist, poet, and fiction writer. He was assassinated in 1993 by the Armed Islamic Group.

== Early life ==
He was born in 1954 in Oulkhou, a village in the Kabylie region. After university he worked as a journalist for Algérie Actualité, and by the late 1980s, he became one of Algeria's foremost literary talents.

== Assassination ==
He was assassinated by the Armed Islamic Group because of his support of secularism and opposition to what he considered fanaticism. He was attacked on 26 May 1993 as he was leaving his home in Algiers, Algeria. He died on 2 June, after lying in a coma for a week. One of his attackers professed that he was murdered because he "wielded a fearsome pen that could have an effect on Islamic sectors."

After his death the BBC made a documentary about him entitled 'Shooting the Writer', introduced by Salman Rushdie.

== Work ==
- The Last Summer of Reason Novel, Ruminator Books, 2001] (French edn: Le dernier été de la raison, Paris, Seuil, 1999]
- The Watchers [Novel, Ruminator Books] (French edn: Les Vigiles, Editions du Seuil, 1991)
- L'invention du Desert, [Novel, Editions du Seuil, 1987]
- Les Chercheurs d'Os [Novel, Editions du Seuil, 1984]
- Les Rets de l'oiseleur (short stories) [SNED, Algiers, 1983]
- L'oiseau minéral, poems, [Sigean, L'Orycte, 1982]
- L'exproprié, [Novel, SNED, Algiers, 1981]
- Insulaire et Cie, poems [Sigean, L'Orycte, 1980]
- L'Arche à vau-l'eau, poems [Editions Saint-Germain-des-Prés, Paris, 1978]
- Solstice Barbelé, poems, [Editions Naaman, Québec, 1975]

== See also ==
- List of Algerian assassinated journalists
