= Miliana-Margueritte Tramway =

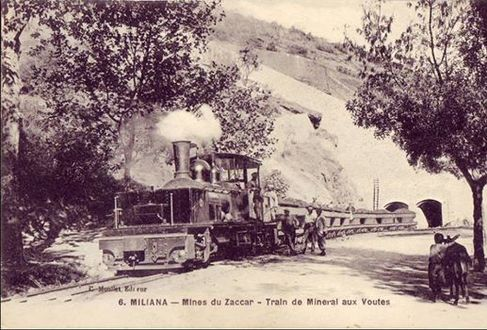
- Garratt locomotive with ore train

Technical
- Line length: 9 kilometres (5.6 mi)
- Track gauge: 750 mm (2 ft 5 1/2 in)

The Miliana-Margueritte Tramway or Zaccar Mines Tramway was a 9 kilometres (5.6 mi) long steam and diesel powered 750 mm (2 ft 5 1/2 in) gauge railway from PLM's Miliana-Margueritte station to the iron ore mines on Mont Zaccar in Miliana, Algeria.

== Historical background and foundation ==
On 16 September 1874, the governor granted a 17-year general mining concession to Messrs. Dupin and Allemand.

On 5 March 1888, the brothers Giraud, two bankers from Oran, received an extension of this concession until 1 July 1906.

On 22 March 1904, the public company Société des Mines du Zaccar was founded in Paris. The purpose of the company was the exploitation of mineral deposits and the construction and operation of all railways required for the transport of ores and metals for a period of 60 years.

== Operation ==
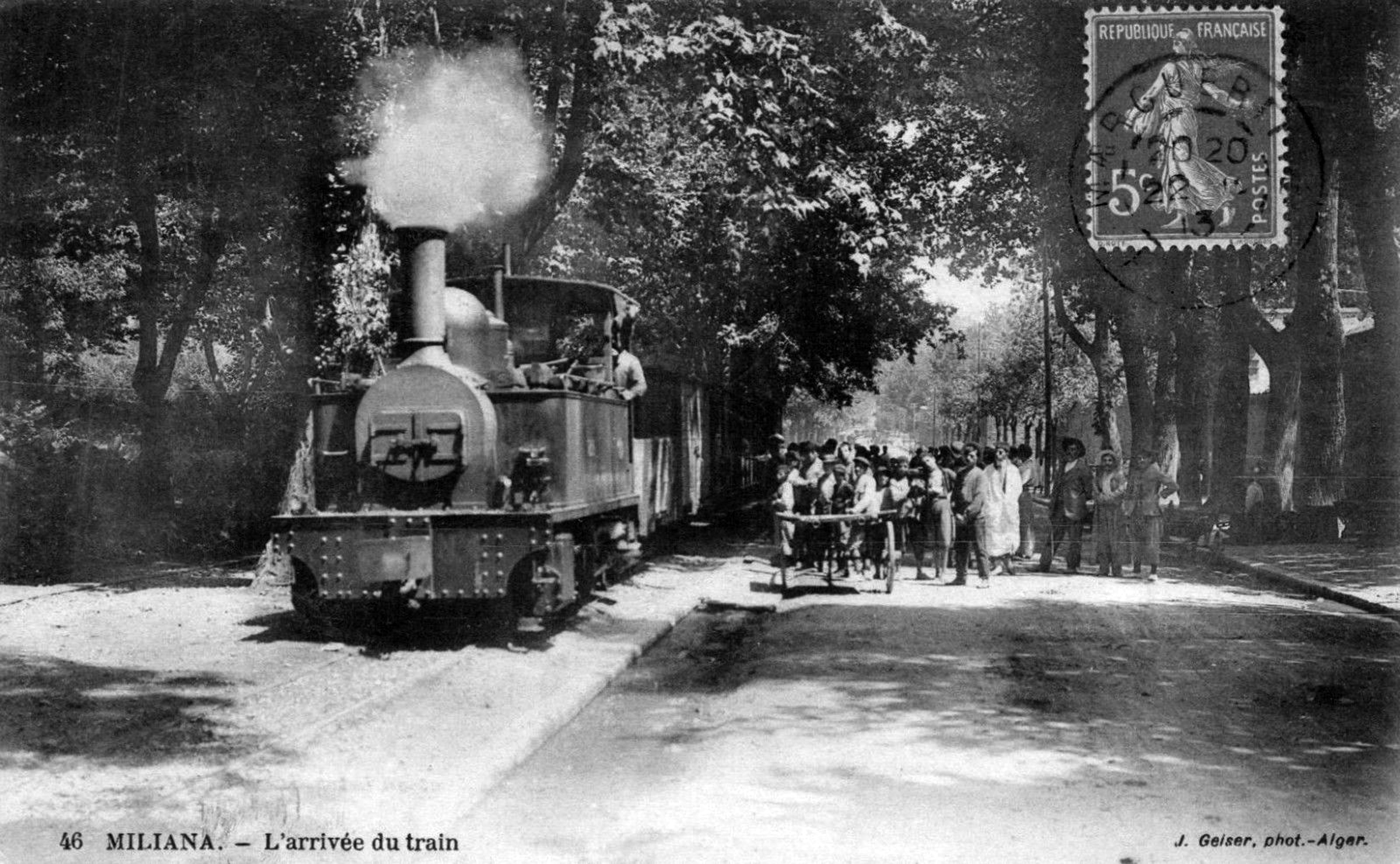
Arrival of a train in Miliana

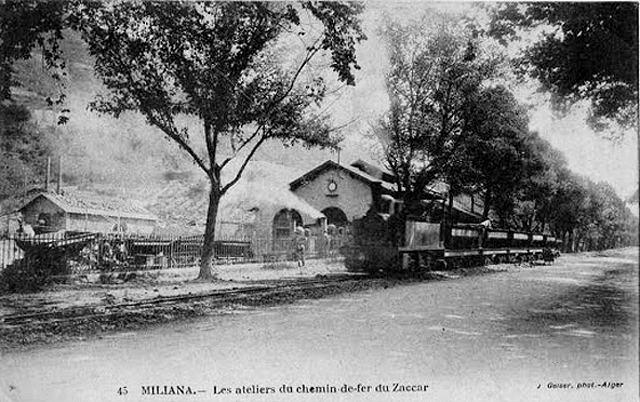
Works

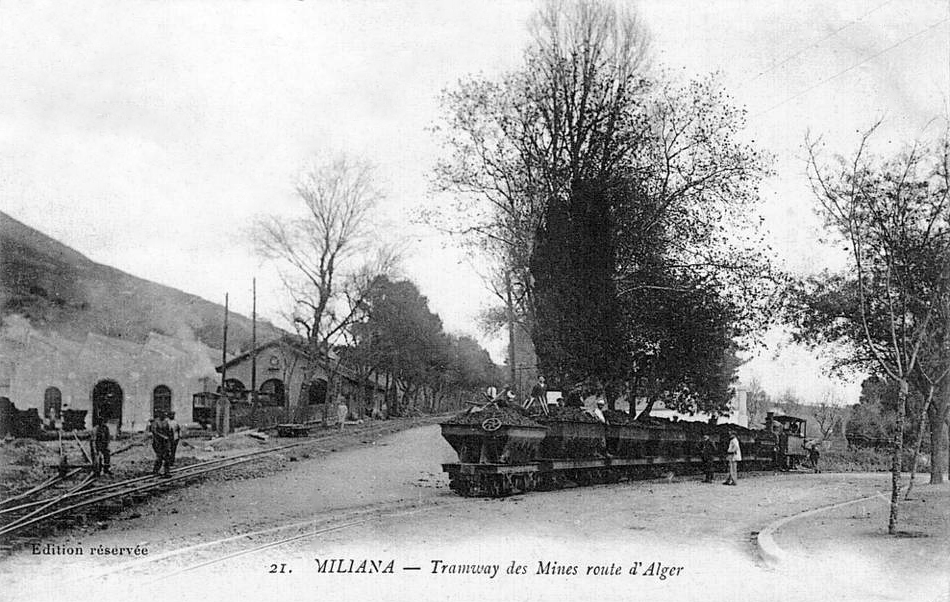
Train

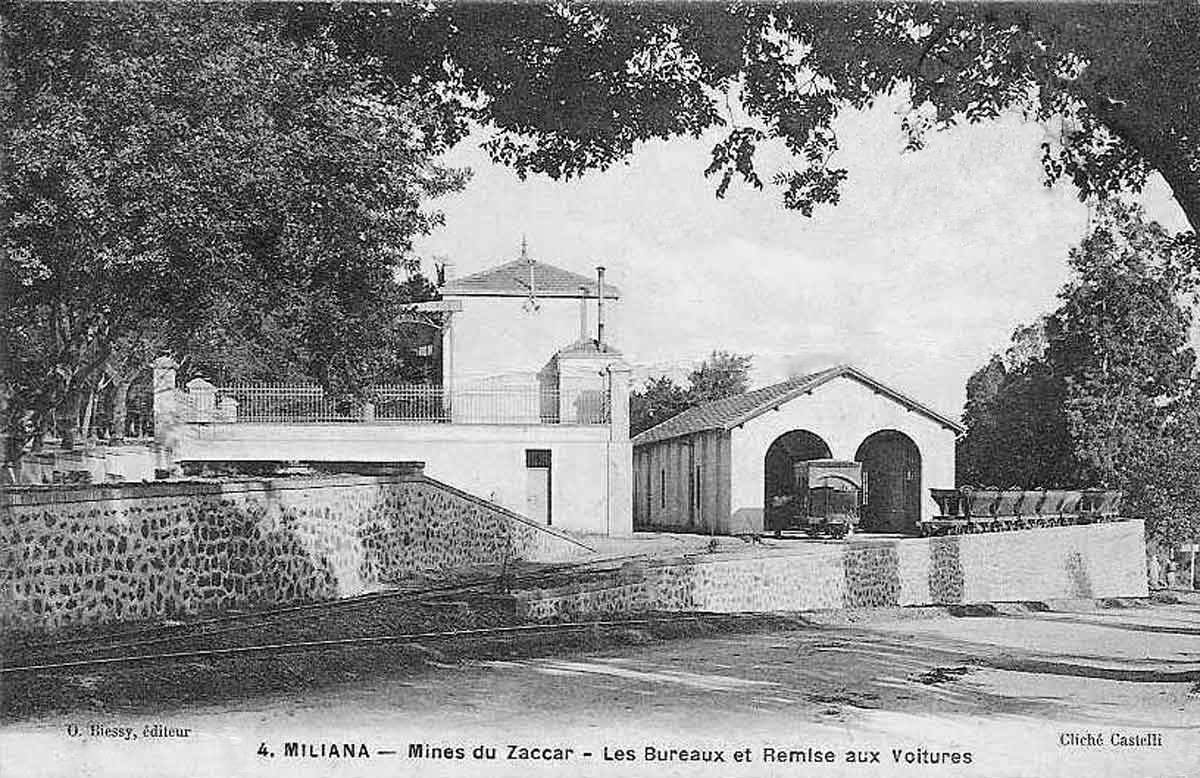
Head office and shed

The operation started on 7 October 1904, with an initial production of an average of 300 tons of iron ore per day. The production in 1905 already 87 879 tonnes. The railway was accepted for public use on 18 September 1908 and publicly operated from 14 October 1909. The transport volume rose until 1912 to a maximum of 227,000 tons per year. In 1927, as a record even 293,870 t were reduced.

The steam locomotive Jeanne could pull six large, funnel-shaped iron wagons filled with ore. These cars had a movable floor and transported 5 to 10 tons each. The Societe Anonyme des Mines du Zaccar took 1912 one of the first eight-wheel Garratt locomotives in operation. On 4 August 1926, a decree was passed, according to which the concession and modification of the operating conditions of the tram from Miliana to Margueritte by the Prefect of Algiers of 24 December 1925 were approved.

The underground mine employed up to 2,000 workers, or about every fourth worker in the city of Miliana. The mine and its railway were decommissioned on 31 December 1975. The mines and their railway closed on 31 December 1975.

== Locomotives ==
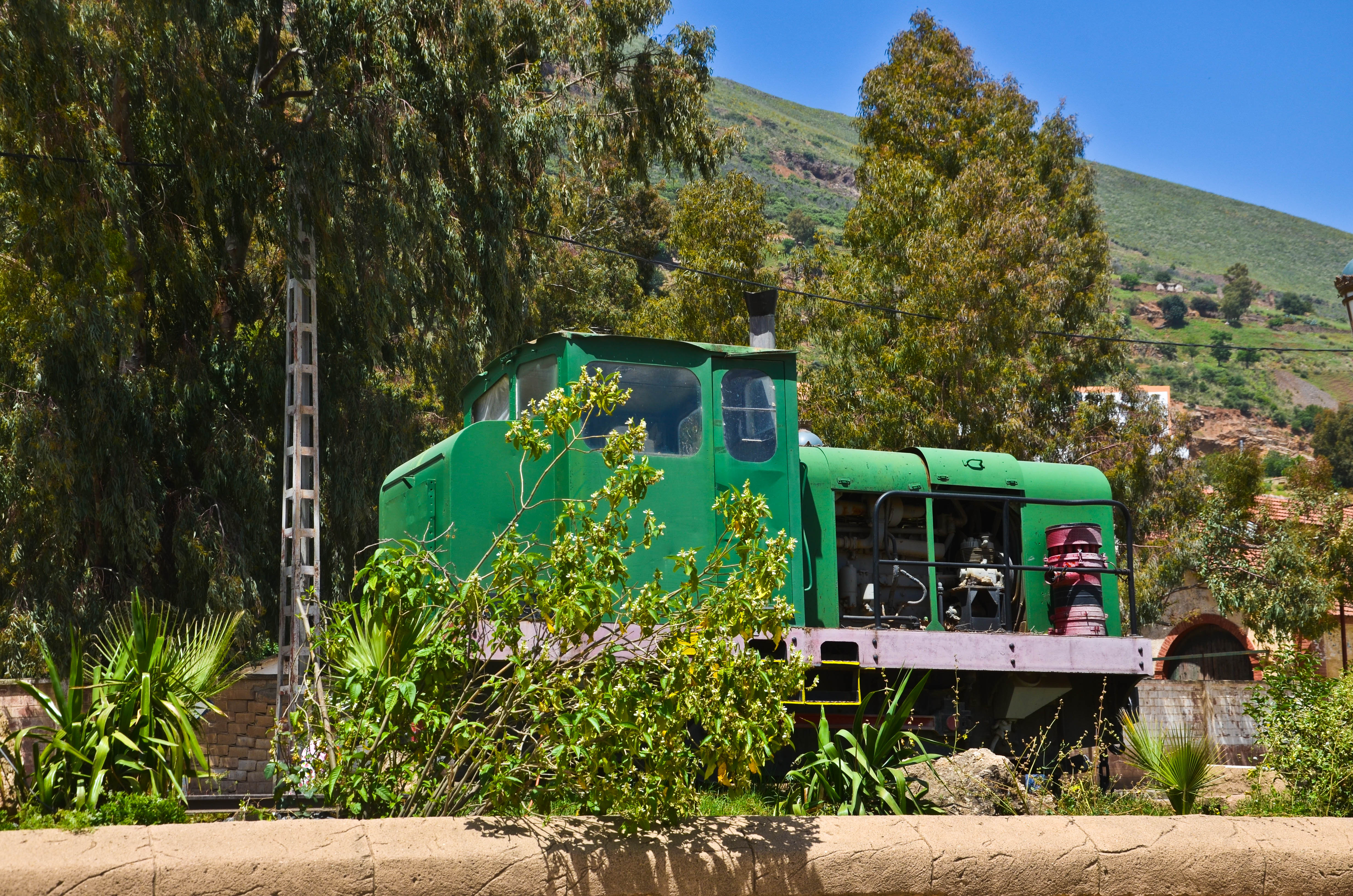
Old diesel locomotive in Miliana

No	Name	Manufacturer	Works No	Year	Type and Power
1	Miliana	Saint-Léonard	N° 1379	1903	0-4-0T steam locomotive
2	Château-Ronsin	Saint-Léonard	N° 1380	1903	0-4-0T steam locomotive
3	Jeanne	Saint-Léonard	N° 1430	1904	0-4-0T steam locomotive
4	Zaccar	Saint-Léonard	N° 1510	1910	0-4-0T steam locomotive
5	Marguerite	Saint-Léonard	N° 1781	1912	0-4-0+0-4-0T Garratt steam locomotive
6		Kerr, Stuart and Company	N° 3121	1918	0-4-0T steam locomotive
7		Kerr, Stuart and Company	N° 3122	1918	0-4-0T steam locomotive
8	Adélie	Haine-Saint-Pierre	N° 1752	1936	0-4-0+0-4-0T Garratt steam locomotive
9	Pierre-Noire	Haine-Saint-Pierre	N° 1783	1937	0-4-0+0-4-0T Garratt steam locomotive
130-1		Gmeinder	N° 4040	1943	Diesel locomotive
130-2		Gmeinder		1943	Diesel locomotive
130-3		Gmeinder		1943	Diesel locomotive
200-1		CFD workshops in Montmirail	N° CFD C 106 A	1949	Upgrade of an 0-4-0T steam locomotive with a 180 bhp Willème diesel engine
200-2		CFD workshops in Montmirail	N° CFD C 106 B	1949	Upgrade of an 0-4-0T steam locomotive with a 180 bhp Willème diesel engine
200-3		CFD workshops in Montmirail	N° CFD C 106 C	1949	Upgrade of an 0-4-0T steam locomotive with a 180 bhp Willème diesel engine
250-4		CFD workshops in Montmirail	N° CFD C 125	1952	
250-5		CFD workshops in Montmirail	N° CFD C 180	1953	
250-6		CFD workshops in Montmirail	N° CFD C 870	1961	Upgrade of an 0-4-0T steam locomotive with a 300 bhp Poyaud diesel engine

== Literature and art ==
Abdelkader Hadj-Hamou (born 1891 in Miliana, died 1953) described in 1925 a ride on the tram in his book Zhora, la femme du Mineur.. He was son of the judge of the city of Miliana, court interpreter, professor of Arabic and almost 20 years chairman of the Grand Mosque.

The Dutch painter Bart van der Leck has produced a large number of studies of the mines and their rail vehicles, which have been purchased, archived and exhibited by the German-Dutch art collector Helene Kröller-Müller.
