= Saïd Mekbel =

Algerian journalist and satirist (1940–1994)

- Born: Saïd Mekbel; March 25, 1940; Béjaïa
- Died: December 3, 1994 (aged 54); Algiers
- Cause of death: Assassination

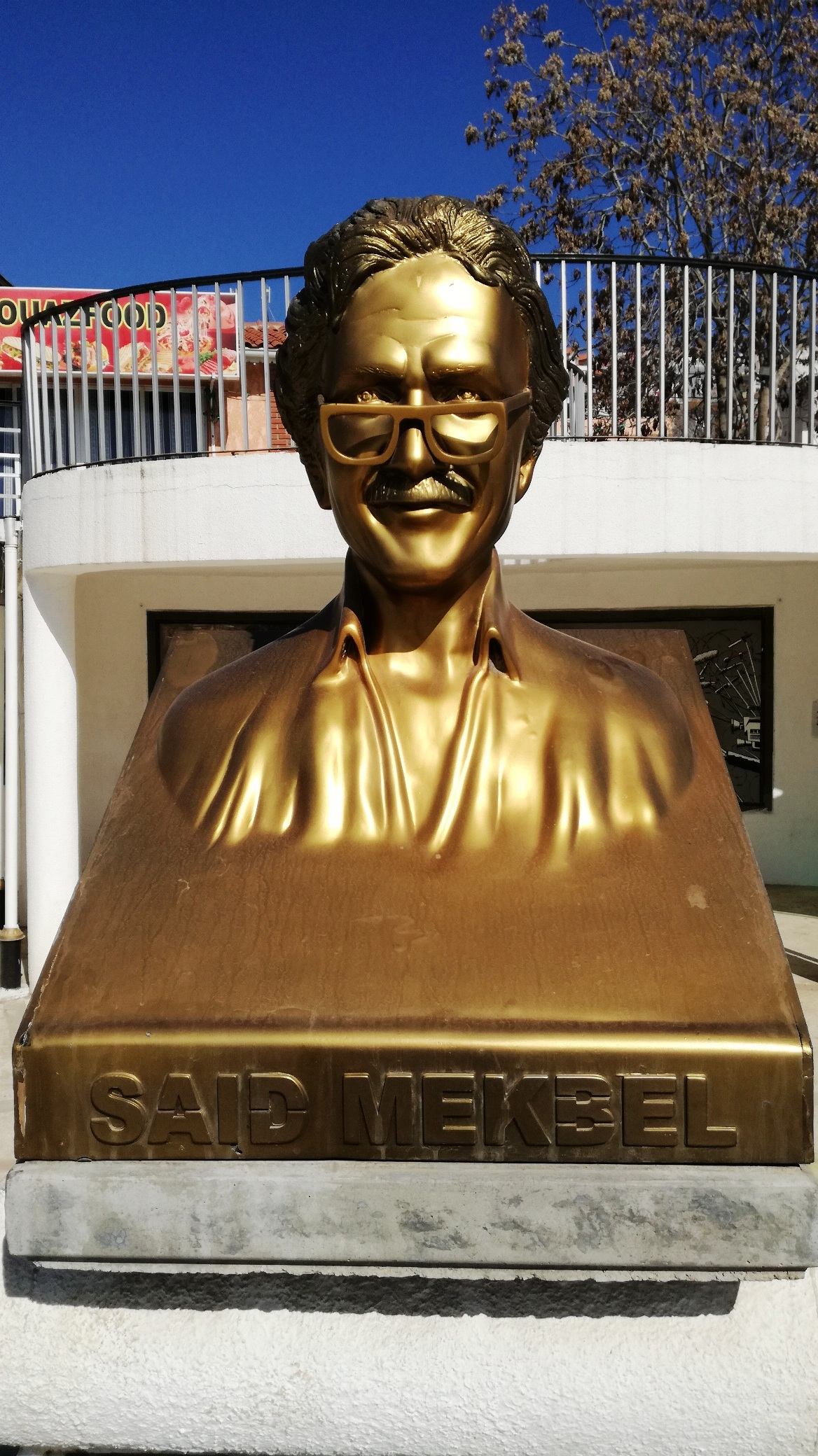
Bust of Saïd Mekbel at Bejaia Province, Algeria

Said Mekbel (March 25, 1940 at Bejaia – December 3, 1994 at Algiers) was an Algerian journalist and satirist.

== Personal ==
Born on March 25, 1940, at Bejaia in a modest family. His father was a seaman. He was the eldest of four children.

At the age of 10, he entered the military school of Miliana, and then entered the Cadet School (Ecole des cadets) of Koléa. He pursued his studies at Aix-en-Provence at its military school and passed there his Baccalaureate. Then he succeeded at the entrance examination of Saint-Cyr. But with the independence of Algeria, he decided to return home once and for all on January 26, 1963.

In 1963, he succeeded at the entrance examination of the ENITA (Algerian National engineer and technician military school). In 1974, he earned his degree of electromechanical engineer. Between 1974 and 1975, he was a teacher at Ben Aknoun University and speaker at the technical school of Blida. Between 1975 and 1976, he returned to Paris to study in “l’Ecole des applications du Gaz”. He pursued his studies in the faculty of science at Algiers and obtained a PhD in mechanical fluid engineering in 1978. Then he became a visiting professor at the Ecole Polytechnique of El Harrach.

== Career ==
In May 1963, he served as an Administrative Officer at the Ministry of Energy, and participated with Beaid Abdesselam and Sid Ahmed Ghozali in the Franco-Algerian negotiations about Petroleum.

But in reality he was attracted by journalism. His first articles were published on Alger Républicain. Satisfied by this first experience, he decided, in May 1964, to leave his job in the Ministry of Energy and devote himself to writing and working as a full-time journalist.

Following the advice of Henri Alleg who was the director of the newspaper, he participated in the satirical column of “L’Ogre” which will become later “El Ghoul”. At the same time, he started his own column named “Mesmar Djeha”. He stayed at Alger Républicain until June 19th 1965, date of the putsch of Houari Boumédiène who prohibited the newspaper.

In October 1965, he will be recruited by the l’EGA (Sonelgaz).

Since 1989, he rejoined “Alger Républicain” and wrote on a regular basis El Ghoul column. He also participated in the satirical newspaper “El Manchar”. But in 1991, and accompanied by a group of journalists as Mohamed Benchicou and Fodil Mezali, he left Alger Républicain to create the daily newspaper “Le Matin”.

== Death ==
He repeatedly received death threats. On March 8, 1994, he escaped a terrorist attack not far from his home. But on December 3, 1994, he was for second time the target of terrorists and was hit by two bullets. He died the next day at Ain Naadja hospital at Algiers.

== See also ==
- List of Algerian assassinated journalists
