= List of Algerian assassinated journalists =

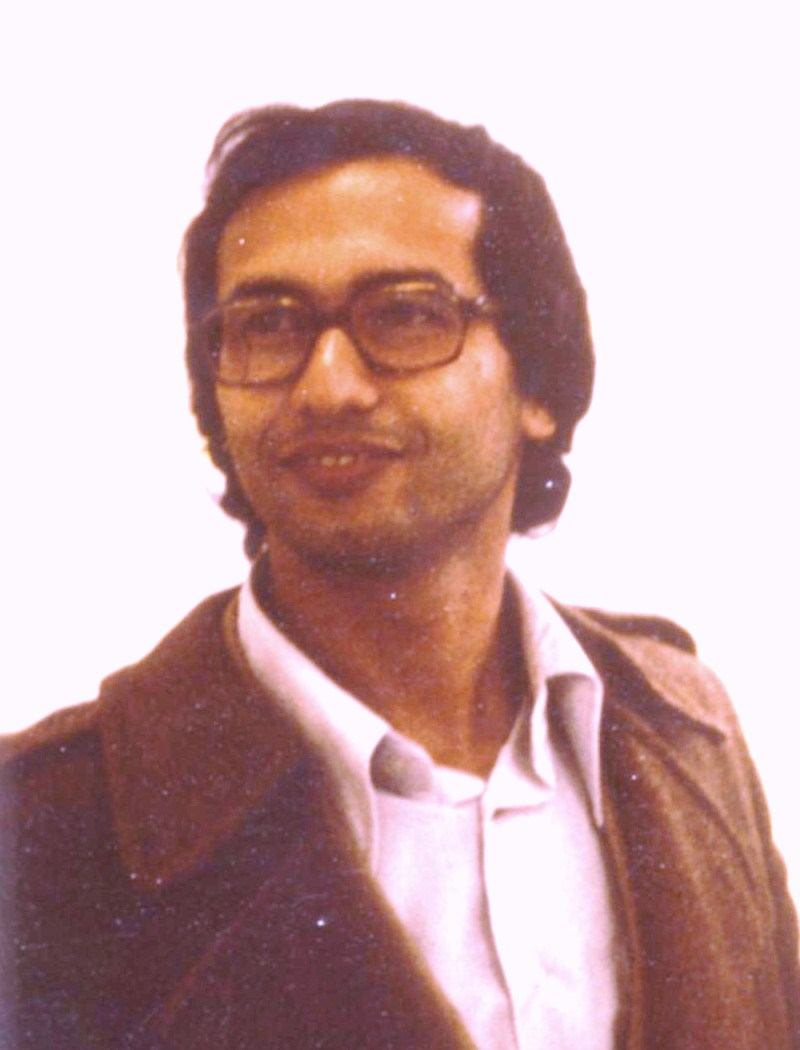
Tahar Djaout

The following is a list of Algerian journalists who have been assassinated by Islamist terrorism in Algeria.

== Journalists ==
=== A ===
- Mustapha Abada
- Ali Abboud
- Mohamed Abderrahmani
- Boussaâd Abdiche
- Khaled Aboulkacem
- Louiza Aït Adda
- Laïd-Ali Aït El Hara
- Allaoua Aït Mebarek
- Zineddine Aliou-Salah
- Yahia Ammour
- Djilali Arabdiou

=== B ===
- Saâdeddine Bakhtaoui
- Mouloud Baroudi
- Achour Belghezli
- Mohamed Belkacem
- Messaoud Bellache
- Mohamed-Salah Benachour
- Bakhti Benaouda
- Hassan Benaouda
- Rachid Bendahou
- Abdelkrim Bendaoud
- Hamidou Benkherfallah
- Abdelhamid Benmeni
- Lahcène Bensaadallah
- Yahia Benzaghou
- Zoubida Berkane
- Aziz Bouabdallah
- Djamel Bouchibi
- Khaled Bougherbal
- Ahmed Bouguerra
- Abdallah Bouhachek
- Djamel Bouhidel
- Ali Boukherbache
- Makhlouf Boukhezar
- Kaddour Bousselham
- Tayeb Bouterfif
- Farida Bouziane
- Radja Brahimi
- Saïd Brahimi
- Yasmine Brikh

=== C ===
- Abderrahmane Chergou
- Ferhat Cherkit

=== D ===
- Khadidja Dahmani
- Djamel Deraza
- Tahar Djaout
- Saïda Djebaïli
- Mohamed Dorbane
- Dalila Drideche
- Yasmina Drissi

=== E ===
- Yasser El Akel

=== F ===
- Djamel Eddine Fahassi
- Mohamed Fettah

=== G ===
- Omar Guebriout
- Hichem Guenifi
- Khaled Guerdjouma
- Brahim Guerroui

=== H ===
- Houria Hammadi
- Rachida Hammadi
- Naïma Hamouda
- Mokrane Hamoui
- Abdelwahab Harrouche
- Mohamed Hassaïne
- Mourad Hemazi
- Abdelkader Hireche

=== I ===
- Naïma Illoul
- Ahmed Issaad

=== K ===
- Mohamed Kessab
- Ahmed Khalfoun
- Rachid Khodja
- Salah Kitouni

=== L ===
- Nassereddine Lakhal
- Rabah Lallali
- Ahmed-Mustapha Lazhar
- Mohamed-Lamine Legoui

=== M ===
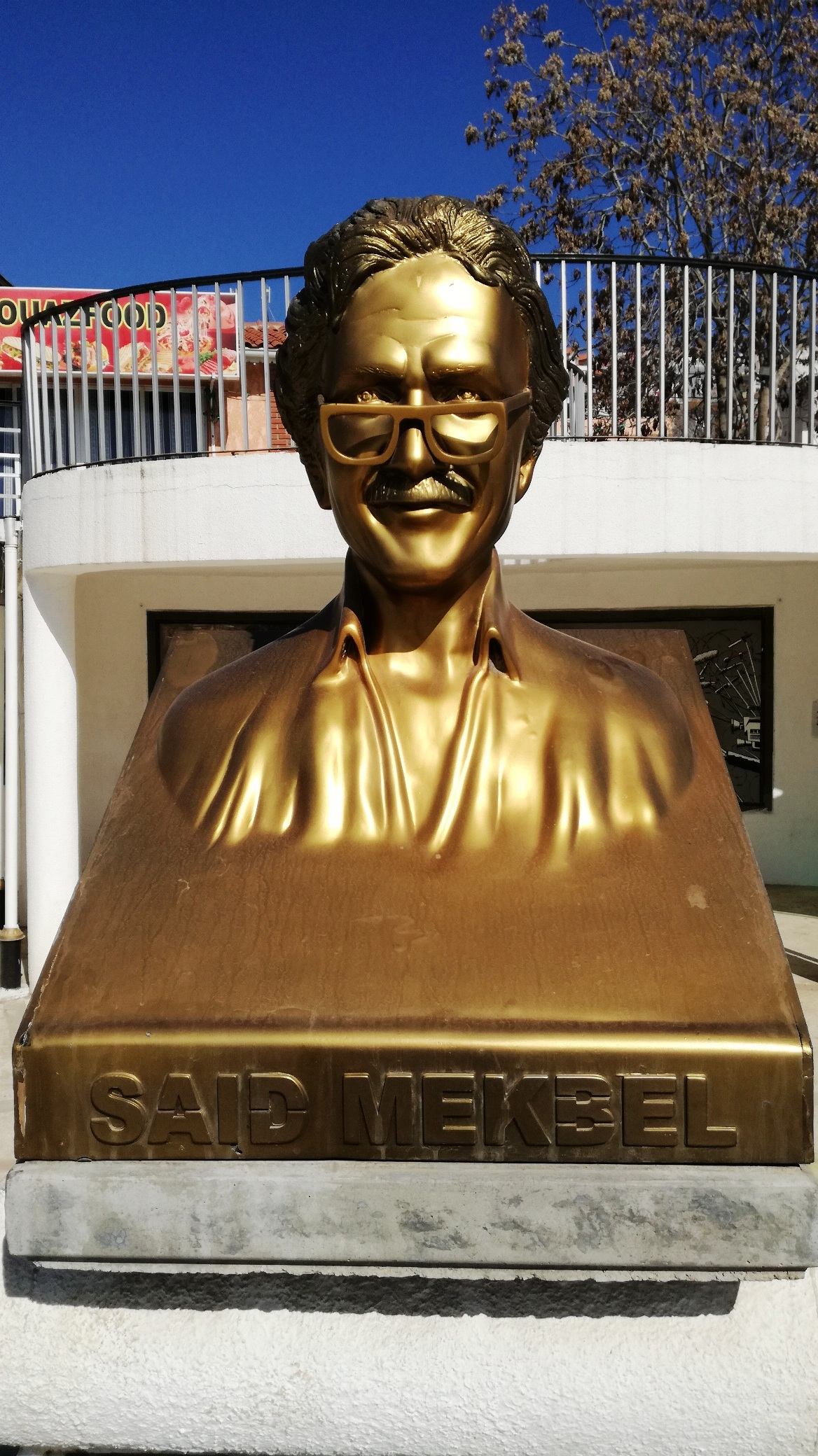
Saïd Mekbel

- Hamid Mahiout
- Saïd Mekbel
- Mohamed Meceffeuk
- Mohamed Mekati
- Khaled Merioud

=== O ===
- Ameur Ouagueni
- Mahmoud Ouarhoum
- Nacer Ouari
- Omar Ourtilane

=== R ===
- Si-Ali Reguieg

=== S ===
- Abdelwahab Saadaoui
- Belkacem Saadi
- Malika Sabour
- Azzeddine Saïdj
- Smaïl Sbaghdi
- Noureddine Serdouk
- El-Hadi Slim

=== T ===
- Mourad Taam
- Ahmed Takouchet
- Saïd Tazrout
- Ali Tenkhi
- Slim Tria

=== Y ===
- Abdelmadjid Yacef
- Abdelmadjid Yahiaoui
- Smaïl Yefsah

=== Z ===
- Rabah Zenati
- Farah Ziane
- Djameleddine Zaïter

== See also ==
- List of Algerian people
- List of Algerian writers
