= The Last Summer of Reason =

Book by Tahar Djaout

- Author: Tahar Djaout
- Translator: Marjolijn de Jagar
- Language: French
- Publisher: Éditions du Seuil
- Publication date: 1999
- English publication date: 2001
- ISBN: 9782020367103

The Last Summer of Reason (French: Le Dernier Été de la raison) is a novel by Algerian writer Tahar Djaout. It was originally written and published in French in 1999. The English translation was produced by Marjolijn de Jagar, and published by Ruminator Press in 2001, with a foreword by Wole Soyinka. The novel was published posthumously.

== Plot ==
Boualem Yekker is a bookseller in a country probably modelled on Algeria. His home is firmly in the grip of religious fundamentalists, but only recently: it was once a republic, but now it is a "Community in the Faith". Djaout presents readers with a terrifying world of religious fundamentalism comparable to Orwell's 1984, but substituting a religious dictatorship for a purely political one.

At first Yekker is only on the periphery of danger. He is "neither elegant nor talented", which puts him out of the spotlight: "what is persecuted above all, and more than people's opinions, is their ability to create and propagate beauty." Still, Yekker is a purveyor of these outrageous "idea- and beauty-filled objects" known as books, so he doesn't fit in too well in this new, retrograde society.

Business isn't exactly booming, of course. Touchingly Djaout describes Yekker's brief moments of hope when he sees people gazing in the shop window. But there is hardly a market for the sorts of books he has any longer. One acquaintance, Ali Elbouliga, still comes to while away time there. Otherwise, Yekker remains largely alone in his bookish world—and the books ultimately prove almost as much a burden as a solace.

Family life also gets more complicated when his daughter turns on him. "The illness of fanaticism had attacked her." She is transformed, "covered with superior certainties".

Yekker tries to continue to live his life in the manner he is accustomed to, but there is no escape from the encroaching fanaticism. It crushes all opposition. Any semblance of rationality is done away with. Even weather forecasts are banned, as if these called some all-mighty's grand plan (and his power) into question. (What a pathetic god it must be they're protecting, if he can be threatened by mortals' barely educated guesses at tomorrow's weather; doesn't the fact that the meteorologists barely ever get it right instead reinforce the idea of divine omnipotence?)

Imagination is dulled, "the world has become aphasic, opaque, and sullen; it is wearing mourning clothes." Books "constitute the safest refuge against this world of horror" all around Yekker, but the books are also a danger to him. Eventually they must make place for "the one, the irremovable Book of resigned certainty."

The threats against Yekker mount. What is, at first, almost harmless child's play intensifies to very real danger. Might conquers right:

They have understood the danger in words, all the words they cannot manage to domesticate and anesthetize. For words, put end to end, bring doubt and change. Words above all must not conceive of the utopia of another form of truth, of unsuspected paths, of another place of thought.
