= Larbatache =

Larbatache الاربعطاش Maréchal-Foch
- Commune
- Location in Algeria
- Coordinates: 36°38′10″N 3°22′15″E
- Country: Algeria
- Province: Boumerdès Province
- APC: 2012-2017

Government
  - Type: Municipality
  - Mayor: Boudegzdam Rachid

Area
  - Total: 1,260 sq mi (3,270 km^{2})

Population (2008)
  - Total: 19 356 c.
- Time zone: UTC+1 (CET)
- Postal code: 35017
- Area code: (+213) 024

Larbatache is a town and city in Boumerdès Province, Algeria. According to the 2008 census it has a population of 19,356.

== Notable people ==
- Lamine Abid, Algerian footballer.
- Mohamed Hassaïne, Algerian journalist.
