= Algerian Muslim Scouts =

National Scouting association in Algeria

Algerian Muslim Scouts الكشافة الاسلامية الجزائرية
- Scouts Musulmans Algériens
- Country: Algeria
- Founded: 5 June 1936
- Founder: Mohamed Bouras
- Membership: 77,554
- General Commander: Abderrahmane Hamzaoui
- Affiliation: World Organization of the Scout Movement
- Website www.scouts-dz.org

Algerian Muslim Scouts (SMA; in Arabic: الكشافة الإسلامية الجزائرية, romanized: al-Kaššāfa al-ʾIslāamiyya al-Ǧazāʾiriyya, in French: Scouts Musulmans Algériens) is the national Scouting association in Algeria. SMA has 77,554 members as of 2021.

== History ==
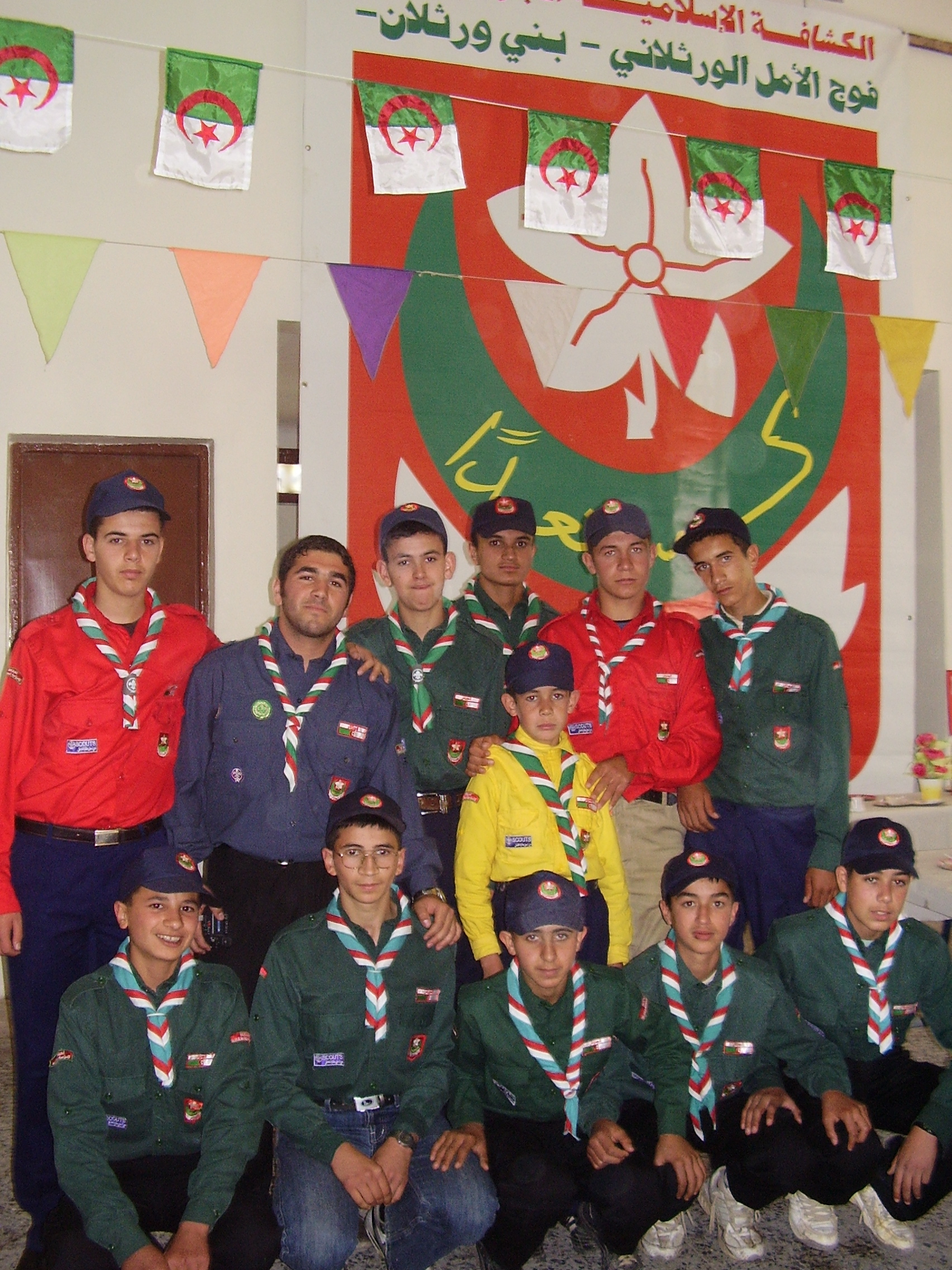
Algerian Scout group, 2008

Scouting in Algeria began formatively around 1911, but Scouting was officially founded in French Algeria in 1935, introduced by Algerian Scouter Mohamed Bouras with a troop in Algiers called the "al Falah". Other sections then united with them: in Miliana the section "Ibn Khaldoun", and others in Constantine, Mostaganem, Blida, Sétif, Tizi Ouzou, Batna and Guelma.

With the proposal of Bouras, the league of the scouts Moslem Algerian was created and obtained the approval of the government of the Popular front in July 1939. Encouraged by Oulémas reformists, the movement propagated patriotic ideas, was guided by nationalist chiefs, and carried out many demonstrations, like that of May 8, 1945, during which Bouzid Chaal, a young scout, died. Many scouts then took part in the war of independence, with the call of the mujaheddin.

Algeria became a member of the World Organization of the Scout Movement in 1963.

== Program ==
Members are actively involved in national construction and community development projects. They have constructed schools, improved roads, planted trees and conducted literacy campaigns.

The Scout Motto is كن مستعداً (Kun Mustaʿiddan, transl. Be Prepared) in Arabic, and Sois Prêt in French. The noun for a single Scout is كشَّاف (Kaššāf) in Arabic. A scout is called Askuti in Berber.

The Scout emblem incorporates elements and color scheme of the flag of Algeria. It also has the crescent of Islam.
