= Ali Dilem =

Algerian cartoonist

Ali Dilem ⴰⵍⵉ ⴷⵉⵍⴻⵎ علي ديلم
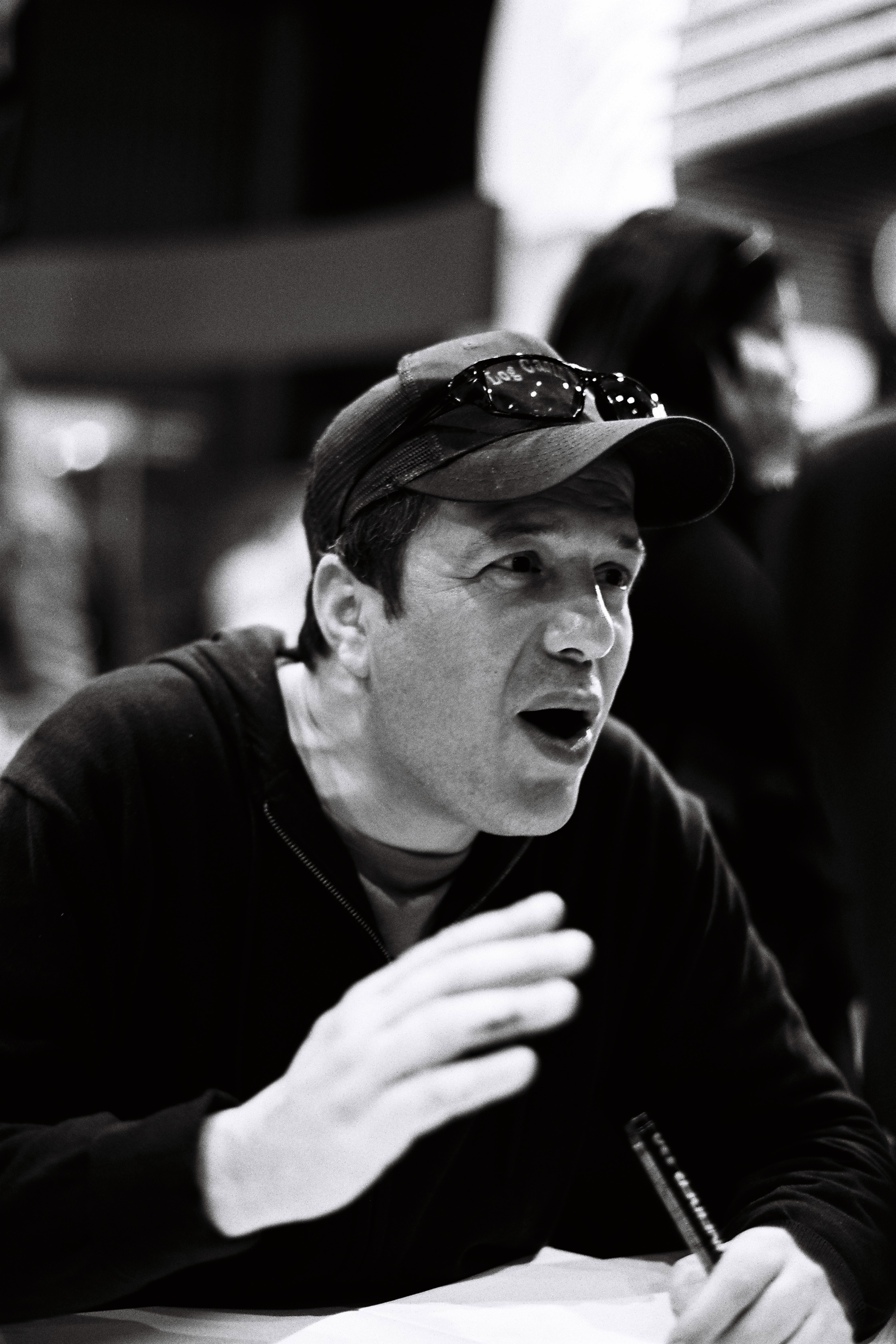
- Ali Dilem in 2012
- Born: June 29, 1967 (age 59); El Harrach, Algiers Province, Algeria
- Occupation: cartoonist

Ali Dilem (born 1967 in El Harrach, Alger Province) is an Algerian cartoonist. On 11 February 2006, he was sentenced to one year in jail and a 50,000 dinar fine by an Algerian court for a dozen cartoons printed in the newspaper Liberté in 2003 depicting President Abdelaziz Bouteflika.

== See also ==
- Imprisonment of Mohamed Benchicou, director of Le Matin
