= Miliana =

Commune and town in Aïn Defla, Algeria

Miliana مليانة
- Commune and town
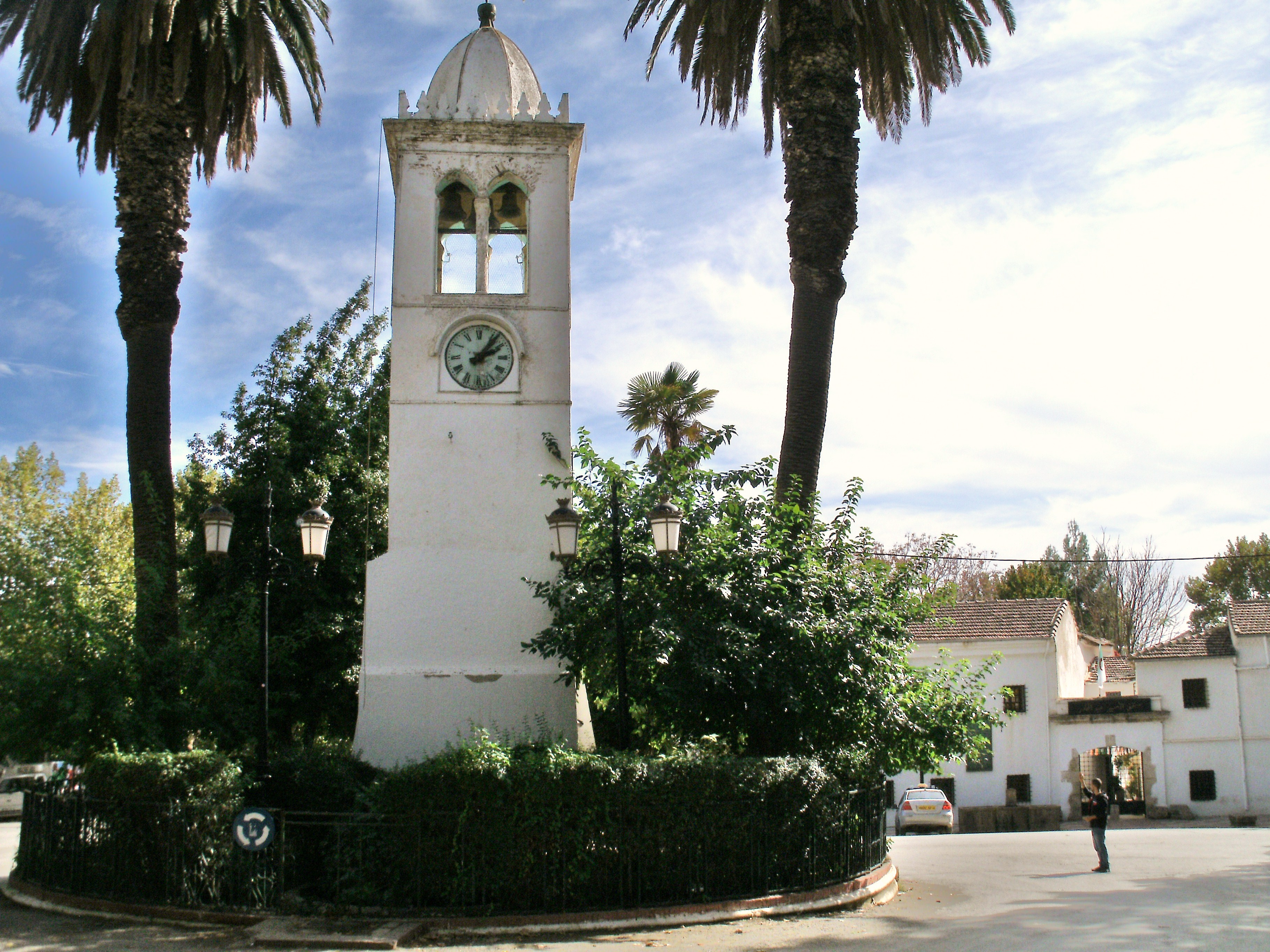
- View of Miliana

- Location within Aïn Defla province

- Location within Algeria
- Coordinates: 36°18′N 2°14′E
- Country: Algeria
- Region: Titteri
- Wilaya: Aïn Defla
- Daïra: Miliana

Area
  - Total: 55 km^{2} (21 sq mi)
- Elevation: 721 m (2,365 ft)

Population (2008)
  - Total: 44,201
  - Density: 804/km^{2} (2,080/sq mi)
- Time zone: UTC+1 (CET)
- Patron Saint: Sidi Ahmed Ben Youcef

Miliana (Arabic: مليانة) is an Algerian commune in the Aïn Defla province, serving as the capital of Miliana district approximately 114 kilometres (71 mi) southwest of the Algerian capital, Algiers. It is located south of Dahra, on the slopes of Mount Zaccar, overlooking the Chelif Valley.

Founded in the 10th century by the Zirid prince Bologhine son of Ziri on the ruins of the Roman city Zucchabar, Miliana lost prominence during the colonial period. Its old town, with several monuments, is a preserved heritage site. Its population descends from Dahra Berbers, Arabs, Andalusians, and Jews.

== Geography ==
=== Location ===
The commune of Miliana is located in the north of the Aïn Defla wilaya. The town is located 114 km to the southwest of Algiers, 50 km to the west of Médéa, and 92 km to the east of Chlef.

=== Topography ===
Due to its position in mountainous terrain, the elevation of Miliana differs greatly, ranging from 430 metres (1,410 ft) to 870 metres (2,850 ft). It is built on a rocky shelf with steep edges on the southern slopes of Mount Zaccar Rherbi^{[fr]}, which covers its entire northern border and reaches 1,550 metres (5,090 ft). There is also a smaller ridge to the south that reaches 700 metres (2,300 ft), separating Miliana from Khemis Miliana. The area around the town is well forested. To the east and south is the Chélif River Valley, and to the west is a large plateau that stretches to the Ouarsenis range.

== Climate ==
Miliana has a Mediterranean climate (Köppen climate classification Csa), with hot, dry summers and mild, wet winters.

Climate data for Miliana (1991-2020)
Month	Jan	Feb	Mar	Apr	May	Jun	Jul	Aug	Sep	Oct	Nov	Dec	Year
Record high °C (°F)	23.8 (74.8)	27.3 (81.1)	31.0 (87.8)	33.8 (92.8)	38.7 (101.7)	42.4 (108.3)	43.7 (110.7)	45.2 (113.4)	40.6 (105.1)	37.4 (99.3)	30.4 (86.7)	24.9 (76.8)	45.2 (113.4)
Mean daily maximum °C (°F)	12.7 (54.9)	13.7 (56.7)	16.9 (62.4)	19.8 (67.6)	24.6 (76.3)	30.3 (86.5)	34.9 (94.8)	34.8 (94.6)	29.5 (85.1)	24.3 (75.7)	17.1 (62.8)	13.6 (56.5)	22.7 (72.9)
Daily mean °C (°F)	9.3 (48.7)	9.9 (49.8)	12.7 (54.9)	15.1 (59.2)	19.4 (66.9)	24.5 (76.1)	28.6 (83.5)	28.6 (83.5)	23.9 (75.0)	19.4 (66.9)	13.4 (56.1)	10.3 (50.5)	17.9 (64.2)
Mean daily minimum °C (°F)	5.9 (42.6)	6.2 (43.2)	8.4 (47.1)	10.5 (50.9)	14.2 (57.6)	18.6 (65.5)	22.3 (72.1)	22.3 (72.1)	18.3 (64.9)	14.6 (58.3)	9.7 (49.5)	7.0 (44.6)	13.2 (55.8)
Record low °C (°F)	−5.8 (21.6)	−3.6 (25.5)	−2.3 (27.9)	1.3 (34.3)	3.4 (38.1)	8.7 (47.7)	14.0 (57.2)	13.0 (55.4)	10.0 (50.0)	2.6 (36.7)	1.3 (34.3)	−1.0 (30.2)	−5.8 (21.6)
Average precipitation mm (inches)	122.8 (4.83)	94.9 (3.74)	95.3 (3.75)	69.6 (2.74)	43.3 (1.70)	11.1 (0.44)	3.9 (0.15)	8.4 (0.33)	27.7 (1.09)	47.7 (1.88)	97.1 (3.82)	100.2 (3.94)	722.0 (28.43)
Average precipitation days (≥ 1 mm)	10.4	9.3	8.0	7.3	5.2	1.5	0.7	1.2	3.5	5.5	9.4	9.1	71.1
Average relative humidity (%)	73	72	66	64	61	52	45	46	56	65	71	75	62
Mean monthly sunshine hours	158.1	166.7	217.0	231.0	275.9	312.0	356.5	328.6	267.0	223.2	162.0	155.0	2,853
Mean daily sunshine hours	5.1	5.9	7.0	7.7	8.9	10.4	11.5	10.6	8.9	7.2	5.4	5.0	7.8
Source 1: NOAA
Source 2: Arab Meteorology Book (humidity and sun)

== Toponymy ==
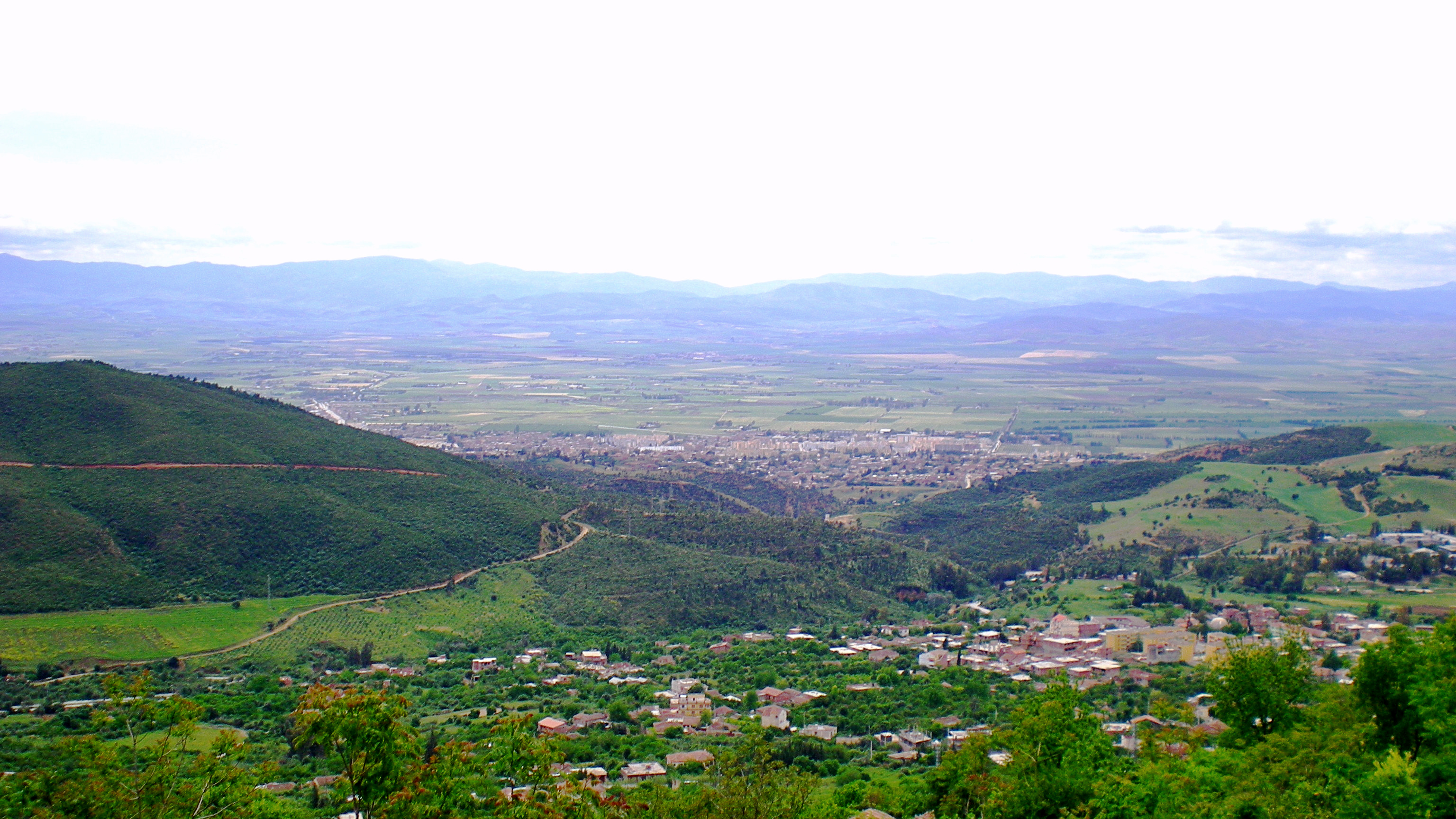
Part of the city on the piedmont plateau, with Khemis Miliana in the background in the valley.

Miliana corresponds to the town of Punic origin known in Roman times as Zucchabar. Under Augustus, it was given the rank of colonia and was thus referred to as Colonia Iulia Augusta Zucchabar. The Greek form of the name used by the geographer Ptolemy was Ζουχάββαρι (Zuchabbari). Pliny the Elder calls it "the colony of Augusta, also called Succabar", and Ammianus Marcellinus gives it the name Sugabarri or (in adjectival form) Sugabarritanum.

Zucchabar belonged to the Roman province of Mauretania Caesariensis. The film Gladiator mentioned a Roman province of Zucchabar, which did exist in fact.

The names Zucchabar or Sugabar were mentioned on epigraphic monuments nearby, indicating the place's belonging to a larger city. This name may be of Phoenician or Libyco-Berber origin, meaning "wheat market."

The name Manliana or Malliana is cited in antiquity as an urban area located at the current site of the town or in the surrounding area, and Saint Augustin refers to a bishop of this city. According to some, this name is derived from Latin and is attributed to the daughter of a patrician Roman family (Manlia) which owned large domains in the agricultural region of the Chélif River valley.

With the Muslim Conquest, the name "Manliana" was arabized to become Mel-Ana, meaning "full of richesses," then Milyana.

== History ==
=== Antiquity ===
For a long time Miliana was the sanctuary capital of the Numidian kings. In 105 BCE Jugurtha was captured not far from this region.

A Roman garrison was established in Zucchabar by Emperor Augustus between 27 and 25 BCE. The city is mentioned by Ammianus Marcelinus during the insurrection of the Berber leader Firmus in 375; the Roman general Theodosius the Elder left Caesarea (now Cherchell) to occupy Sugabarritanum.

Zucchabar was an important city in the province of Mauretania Caesariensis and became a Christian episcopal see. The names of two of its Catholic bishops and one Donatist are recorded:

- Maximianus, who attended the Conference of Carthage (411);
  - Germanus, the Donatist bishop who attended the same conference;
- Stephanus, one of the Catholic bishops whom Huneric summoned to a meeting in Carthage in February 484 and then exiled.

The bishopric is included in the Catholic Church's list of titular sees.

In the 5th century, with the arrival of the Vandals, the Roman city was abandoned along with most of its ancient monuments.

=== Medieval Muslim Algeria ===
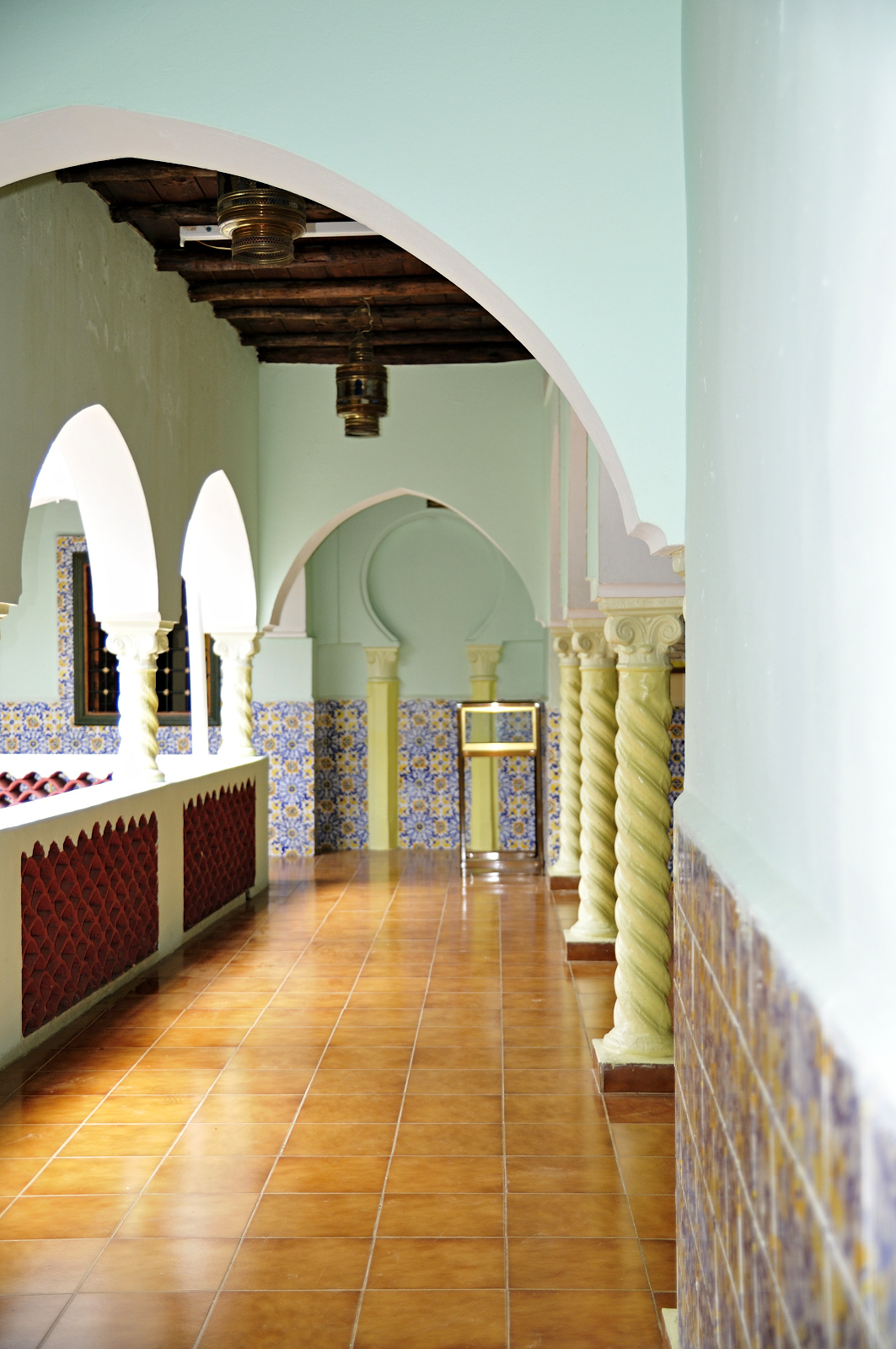
Former home of Emir Abdelkader, now the municipal museum.

Between 972 and 980, Prince Buluggin ibn Ziri, founder of Algiers and Médéa, constructed a medina atop the ruins of the Roman city. During this period, the city experienced a renaissance and great prosperity. It is mentioned by several Muslim geographers. In the 10th century, Ibn Hawqal was the first to reference the city in his writings. He describes it as "Ancient city, equipped with water-mills turned by its waterway and possessing a large number of irrigation canals." In the 11th century, Al-Bakri wrote that Miliana was one of the cities constructed by Buluggin, along with Algiers and Médéa. In the 14th century, Ibn Khaldun described the city as "part of the Maghrawa Beni Warsifen domain in the Chélif River plain," and that Buluggin had drawn the map for El Djezaïr, Melyana and Lemdiya. Throughout this period, Miliana was a haven of culture. It held a large number of scholars in different fields and scientists, including Ahmed Ben Otmane El Meliani, 13th century writer and poet, and Ali Ben Meki El Miliani, 14th century theologian and jurist.

The city was in the territory of the Maghrawa tribe.

Like other cities in the Maghreb, Miliana underwent several conquests as well as political turmoil. In 1081, Yusuf Ibn Tashfin, leader of the Almoravids, occupied Algiers, Médéa, and Miliana. Afterward, the city was integrated into the Almohad Caliphate in 1149. In 1184, the Banu Ghaniya seized the city along with others in the central Maghreb. The following year, the Almohads reclaimed their territory, and the Banu Ghaniya withdrew from Ifriqiya.

In 1238, the Hafsids of Tunis supported their allies, the Banu Tudjin, in their possession of the city. In 1261, Abou Hafs, brother of the Hafsid emir of Tunis, laid siege to the city and conquered it with forces that included mercenary Christian knights led by the exile Henry of Castile. In 1268, the Zayyanid sovereign Yaghmurassen Ibn Zyan attempted to occupy the region of Miliana; the city would only become occupied by the Tlemcen kings in 1308 when the Abd al-Wadids imposed their authority over Miliana and nearly all the cities in the central Maghreb. During the fall of the Zayyanid Kingdom, one of this dynasty's prince seized Miliana, Médéa, and Ténès in 1438, but he was killed by his son who became the king of Ténès.

In 1517, Oreç Reis seized the city and the Chélif River valley; Miliana became an Ottoman caidat. However, the region saw many uprisings against the Ottoman rule during this period, notably that of Bouterik, sheik of the Soumata tribes in 1544.

=== French Colonization ===
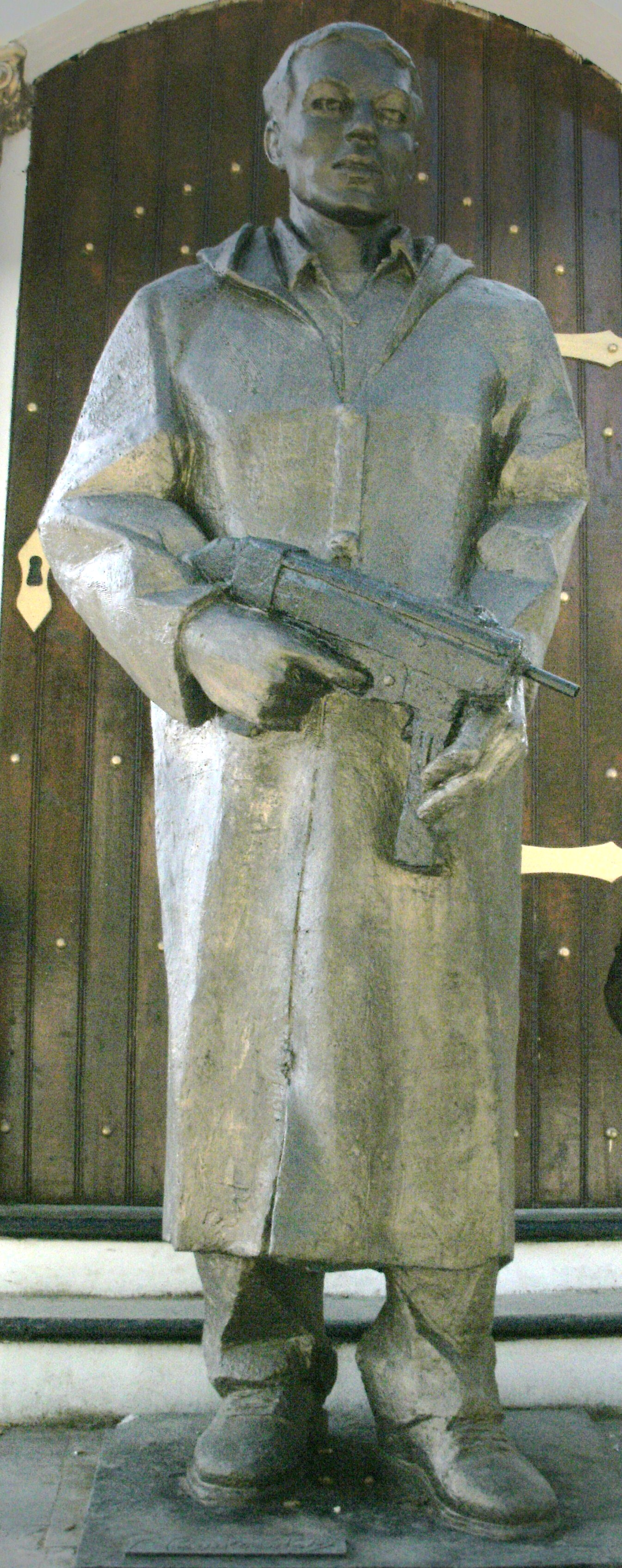
Statue of Ali La Pointe in the square named after him.

After the Invasion of Algiers in 1830, the French encountered resistance from the population who pledged allegiance to Emir Abdelkader, who established a caliphate in Miliana in 1835. The Peace Treaty of Desmichels guaranteed Emir Abdelkader the right to take possession of Miliana starting in 1835 where he was warmly welcomed by the city's general population and prominent citizens.

Due to its geostrategic position, Miliana became a caliphate governed by the caliph Mohieddine Seghir^{[fr]} (1835-1837) and then Ben Allel^{[fr]} (1837-1840) who led 10,440 combattants. The emir built several establishments there, including the caliphate seat and an arms manufactory.

The city was occupied in 1840 by Marshal Valée's troops, but the garrison was sieged several times by Ben Allel and local tribes. Reinforcements were therefore dispatched from Algiers by Marshal Bugeaud to support those under siege. Abdelkader ordered Miliana burned rather than surrendering to the French. The town eventually fell under French control in 1842. Ben Allel died in 1843 and the French troops burned the city in 1844 to drive out the emir's followers. It was rebuilt in the French Colonial architectural style.

Emperor Napoleon III visited Miliana in 1865. In 1901, the Righa tribes of Aïn Torki revolted, under the direction of Sheikh Yakoub.

During this period, the city was marginalized in favor of the colonially created Khemis Miliana.

In 1957 during the Algerian War a battle took place at the Oued Guergour to the south of Miliana between the mujahideens and the French army.

From 1874 to 1975 up to 2000 people worked in an underground iron ore mine on Mont Zaccar, which transported the ore and passengers by the 9 kilometres (5.6 mi) Miliana-Margueritte Tramway to the nearest PLM railway station in Miliana-Margueritte.

== Demographics ==
Miliana is an old city, populated by the descendants of Arabs, Moriscos, Kouloughlis, and Berbers of the Mount Zaccar region.

Miliana is the fourth most populous commune in the wilaya of Aïn Defla, after Khemis Miliana, Aïn Defla, and El Attaf, and according to the 2008 Algerian Census, the population of the commune is registered at 44,201 residents as opposed to 22,528 in 1977:

Historical population
Year	1977	1987	1998	2008
Pop.	22,528	27,183	39,662	44,201
±%	—	+20.7%	+45.9%	+11.4%
Source: Census

== Town structure ==
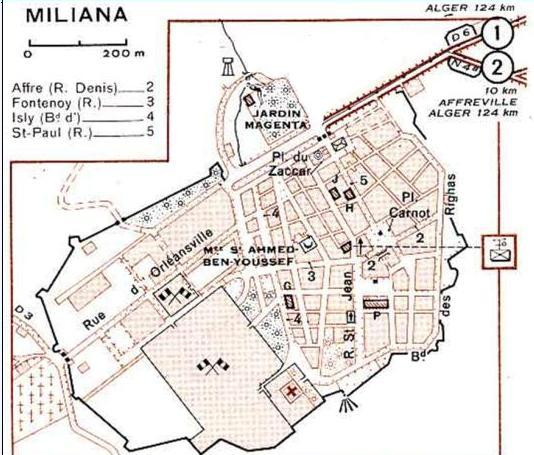
Map of Miliana, late 1950s.

The center of Miliana has a Muslim quarter and a French quarter, both of which are surrounded by city walls built on Turkish and Arab foundations. The main site in the Muslim quarter is the Mosque of Sidi Ahmed ben Yousef. Built in the Moorish style, the mosque is the location of a biannual pilgrimage. The Muslim quarter also contains a covered marketplace. The modern section of the town center, known as the Place Cornot (or Place de l'Horloge), is shaded by trees and contains a clock tower, formerly a minaret.

== Economy ==
Miliana is primarily an agricultural town. Its vineyards, orchards and gardens, which lie below the town center, are fed by water from nearby mountains that usually have snow in winters. Hydroelectricity is used to power tile factories, flour mills and other light industries.

== Recreation ==
The game of El Koura is a traditional game that was played in Miliana, Laghouat and other places prior to French colonization. Similar to association football, the game was played during the spring and times of extreme drought because it was believed to bring rain. After French colonization, European sports, especially association football, became more popular.

The town is home to Algerian club football team S.C. Miliana.

== Culture ==
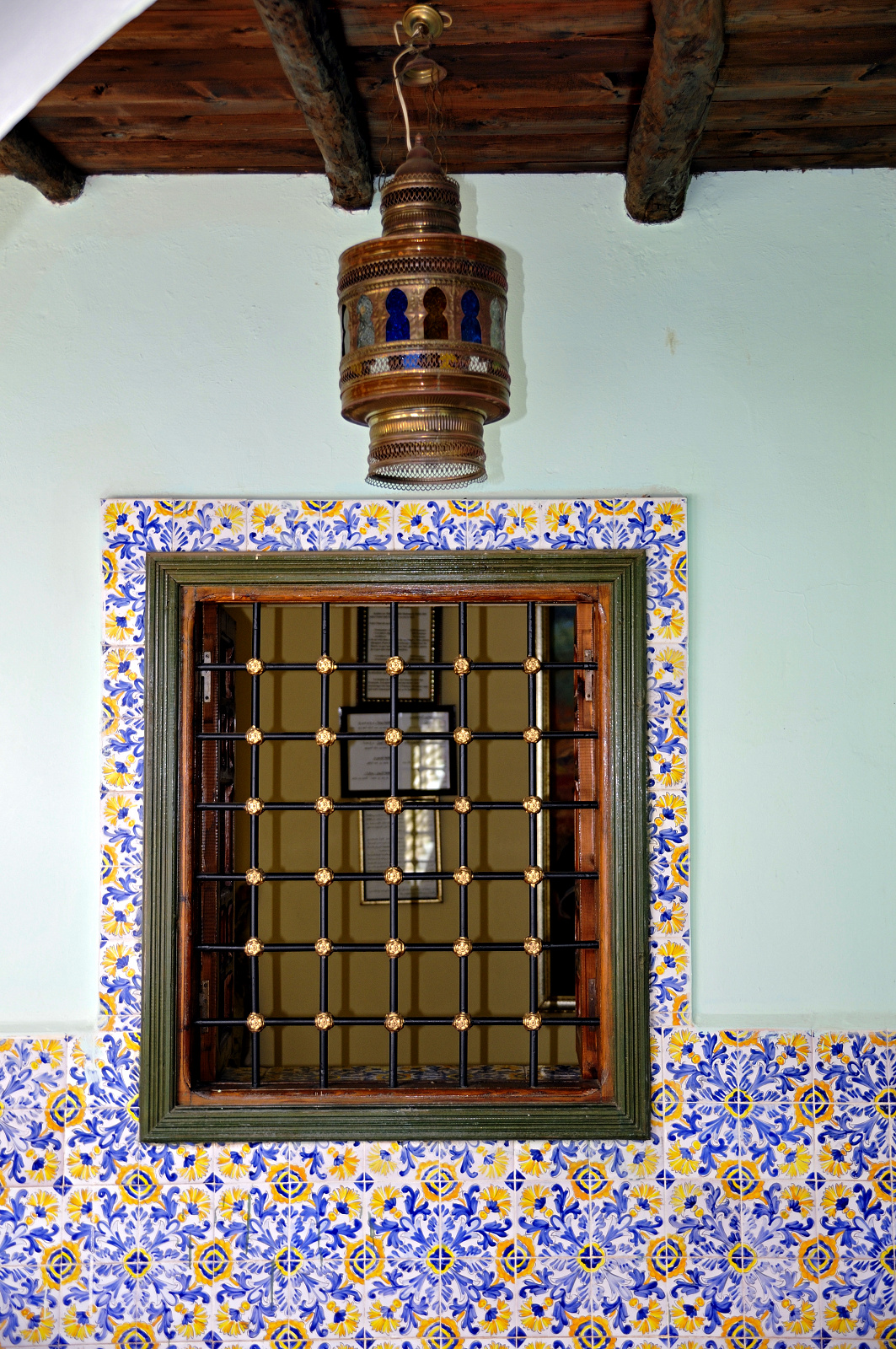
Moorish style house

Miliana is home to several musical groups who specialize in different Algerian musical genres: Andalusian, Chaabi, and Zurna. It hosts an Andalusian music festival, which brings together musicians from the three Algerian schools of music: Sanâa^{[fr]} of Algiers, Gharnati of Tlemcen, and Ma'luf of Constantine.

The celebration of Mawlid al-Nabi (celebrating the birth of Muhammed) in Miliana stands out because of the crafting of m'narette, wooden and reed models of mosques, towers, and boats. On the eve of Mawlid, a parade of m'narette, lit up with candles and decorated with sweets and fruits, makes its way to the Sidi Ahmed Benyoucef mosque.

Miliana's Rekb is a regional tradition of the Berber tribe of Beni Farah, an annual pilgrimage to the interior of the mausoleum of Sidi Ahmed Benyoucef. Hundred of pilgrims come from several regions throughout the country to make their journey from the city of Messelmoun (Tipaza wilaya) to the saint's mausoleum.

Miliana's Cherry Festival is an annual socio-cultural event established during colonization and has been maintained since independence. It takes place during the last week of June. The festival allows the citizens of Miliana to celebrate the qualities of Miliana's cherries, and enables visitors to discover the city's customs and to try the different confections made from cherries. The festival experienced a decade-long hiatus, then was once more celebrated as part of a plan to revive specific local celebrations in the Aïn Defla wilaya. Cherry production greatly declined along with other horticulture; construction and the destructuring of the city's gardens are the principal cause.

== Local Sites ==
Some monuments from the 18th and 19th centuries remain today. The former home of Emir Abdelkader is a Moorish style building located in the city center, restored and transformed into the museum of Miliana. It contains several exposition halls on the history of the region, including archeological artifacts from the Roman and Muslim periods, the popular revolts against French conquest, and also ethnographic objects from Southern Algeria.

The Sidi Ahmed Benyoucef Mosque is dedicated to the saint Abu El-Abbas Ahmed Benyoucef Errachidi, a mystic figure born in Kalaa near Mascara in the mid-15th century, who died in 1526 and was interred in Miliana in 1774 by Mohamed El-Kebir, the bey of Oran. The minaret El-Batha was part of a previous mosque called djemâa El-Turk or djemâa El-Batha; this mosque was destroyed around 1844 for the construction of a public square and its minaret was transformed into a clocktower.

Emir Abdelkader's arms manufactory, located in a suburb of the city, was erected by the emir around 1839. The ramparts, according to some sources, are ancient in origin, but they have undergone many transformations, particularly for the extension of the colonial city. The city contains a large public garden created in 1890.

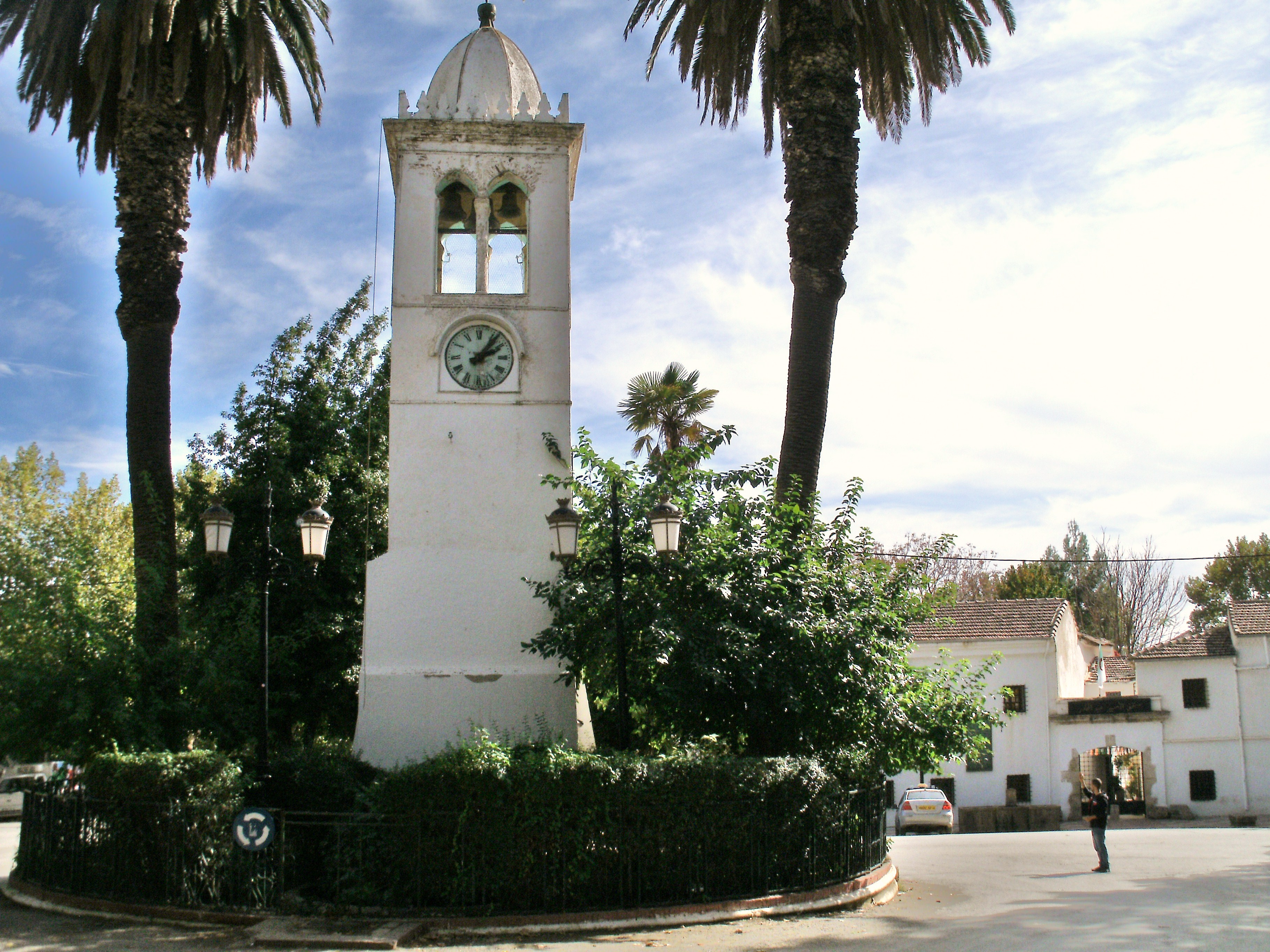
City center; clocktower and museum

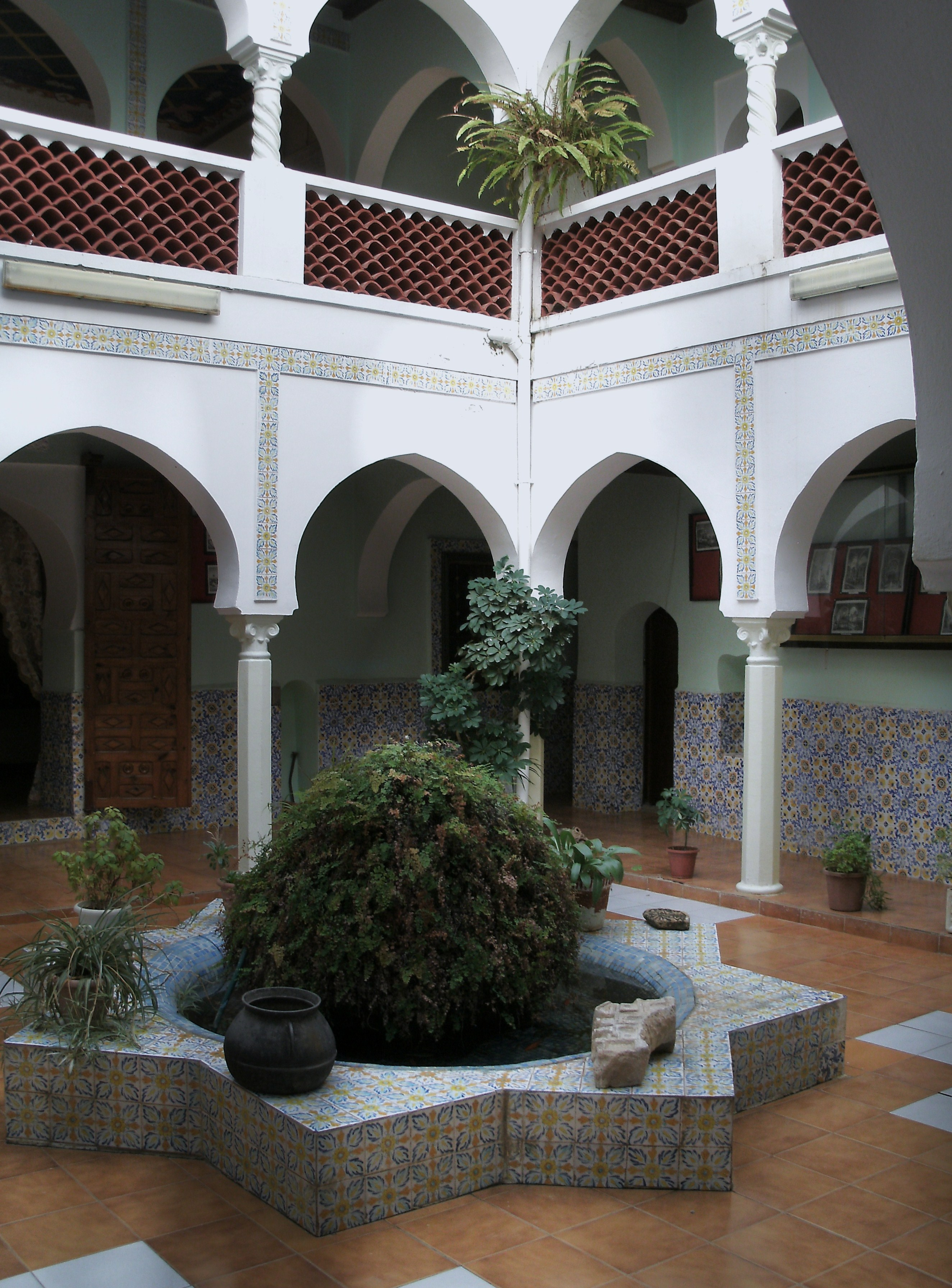
Emir Abdelkader Museum

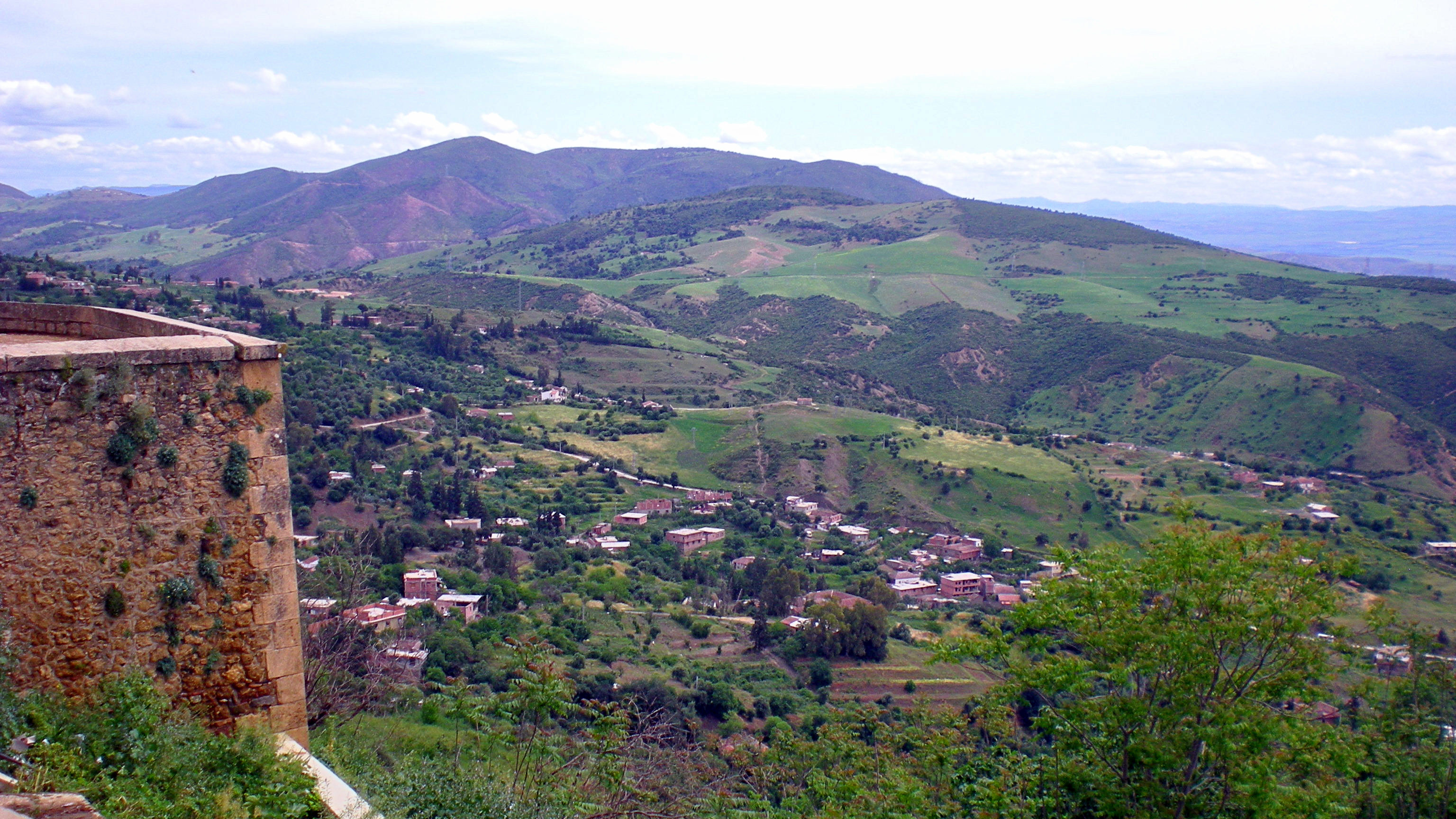
Ramparts and suburbs

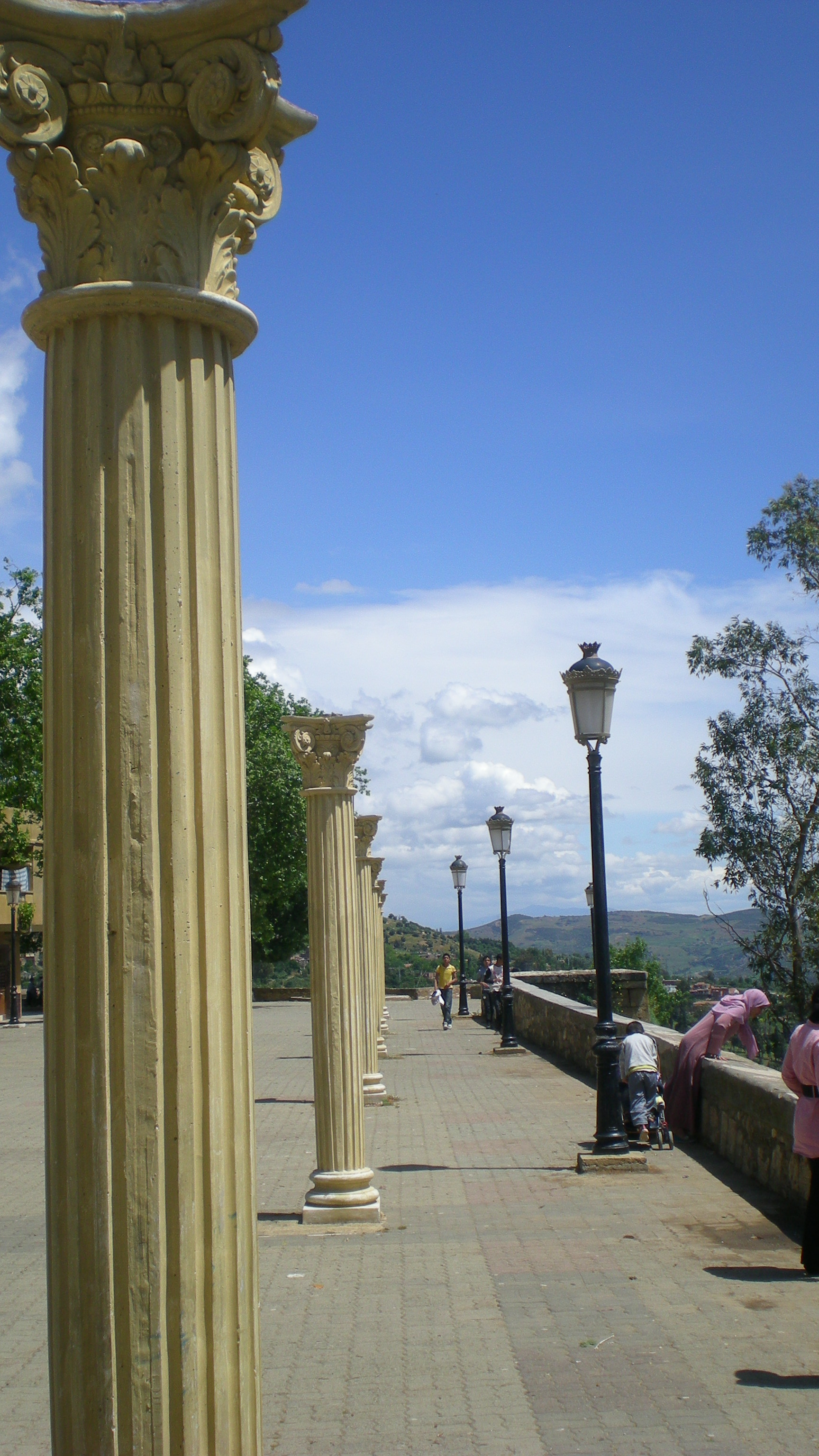
The Place Ammar Ali overlook

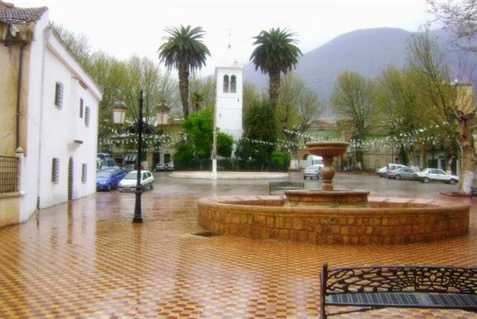
El-Batha minaret

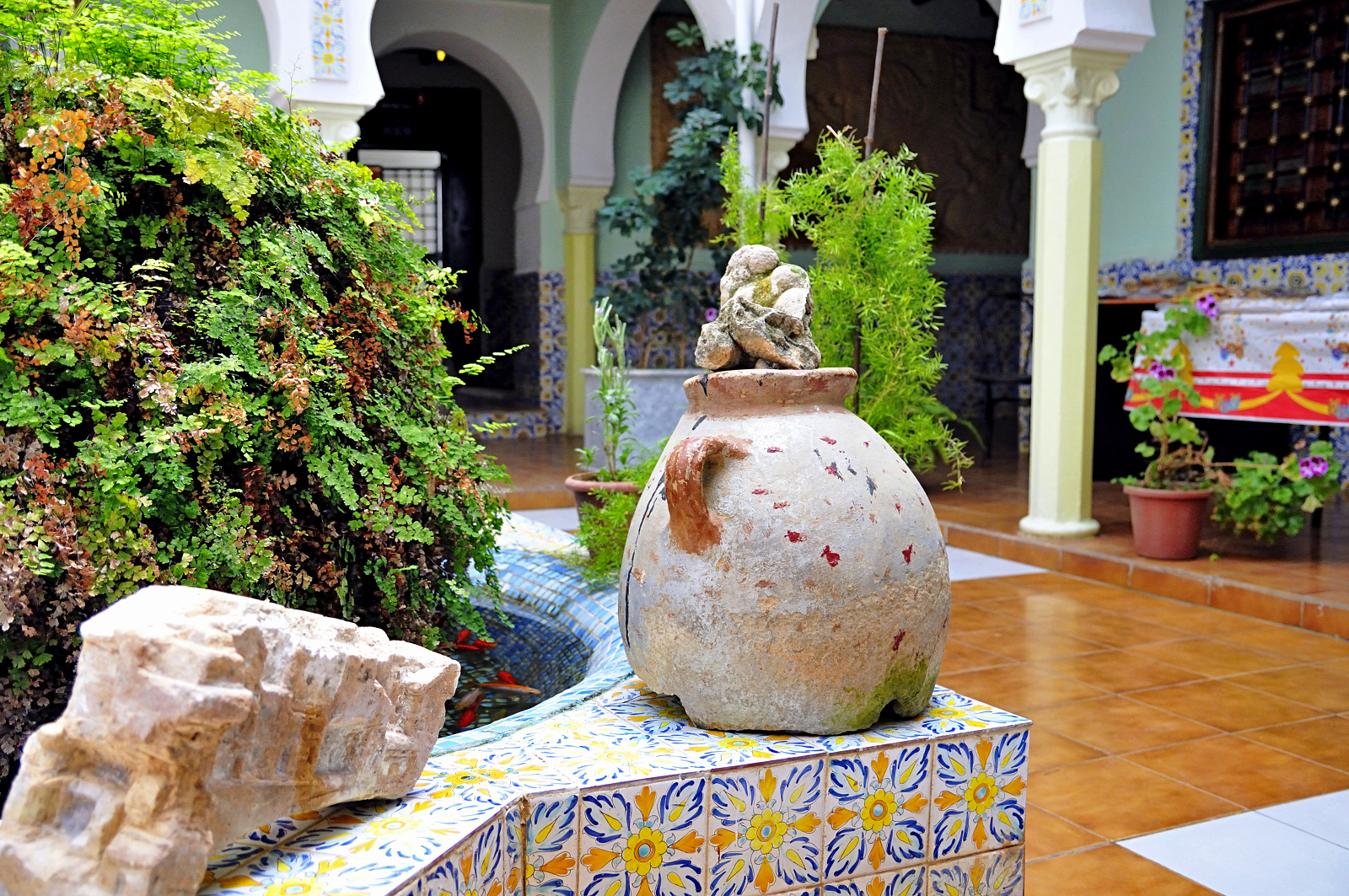
Museum of Miliana

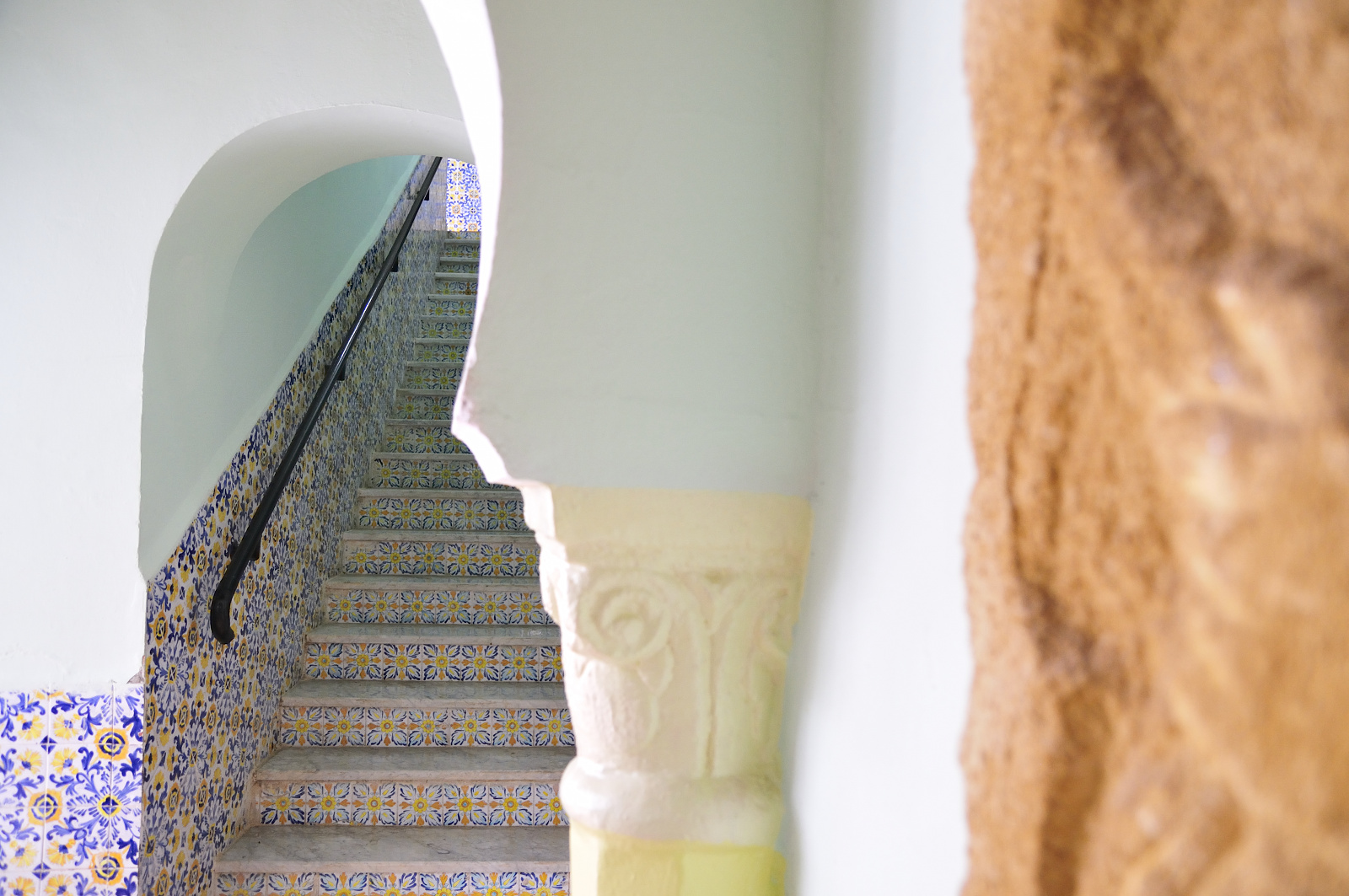
Emir Abdelkader's home

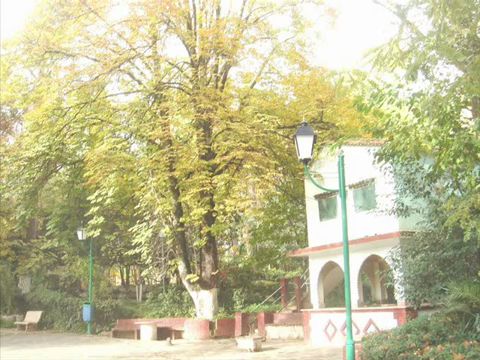
Miliana's public garden

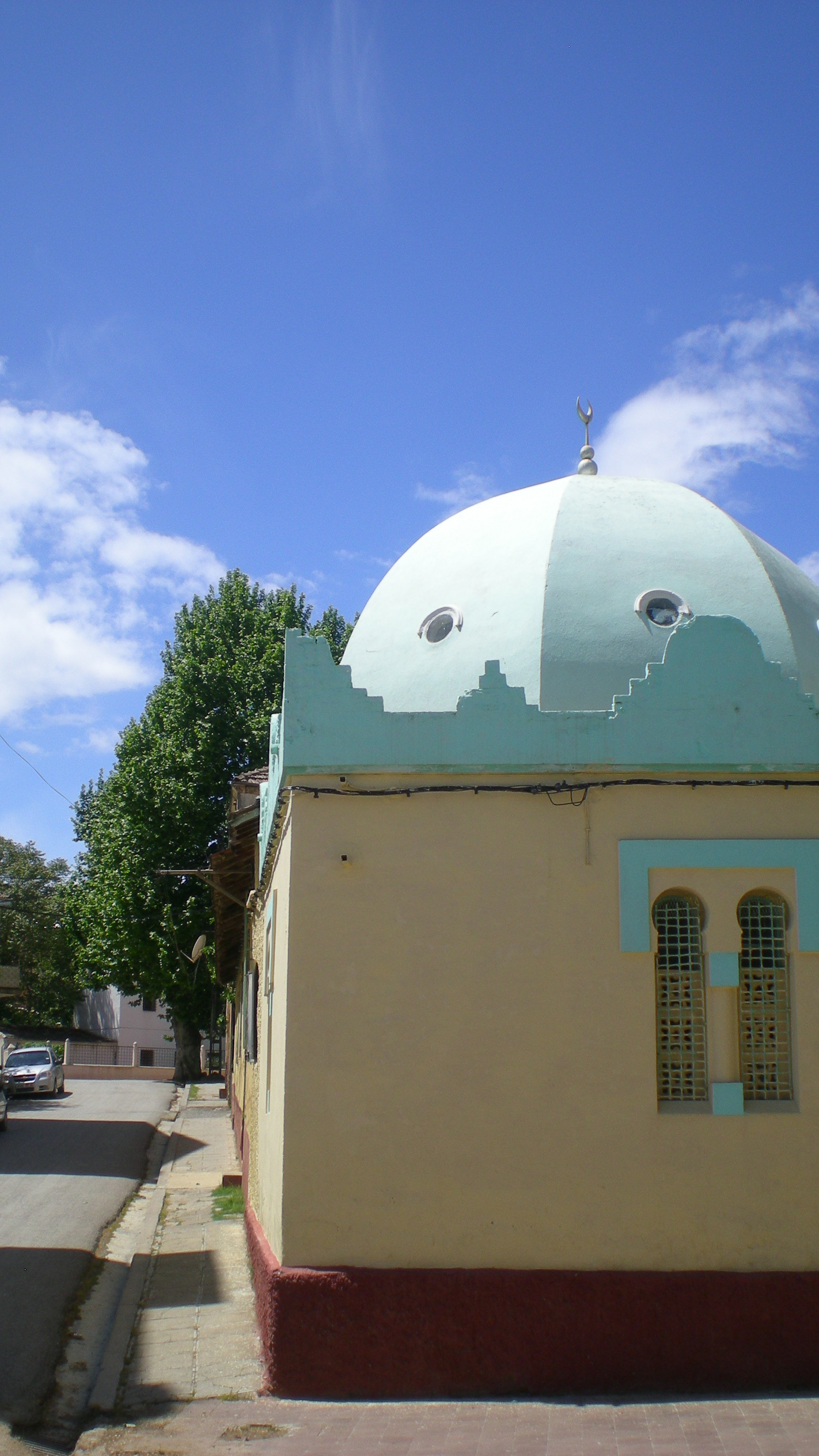
Mausoleum of the Saint

== Notable people associated with Miliana ==
- Sidi Ahmed Benyoucef Errachidi (1435–1524), whose mausoleum was classified a historic monument in 1978.
- Mohamed Charef (1908-2011), theologian and mufti.
- Mohamed Belhocine (born 1951), Algerian medical scientist, professor of internal medicine and epidemiology.
- Mustapha Ferroukhi^{[fr]}, resistance fighter.
- Mohamed Bouras^{[fr]}, founder of the Algerian Muslim Scouts.
- Ali Ammar known as Ali La Pointe (1930-1957), resistance fighter and martyr of the Algerian Revolution. Hero of the Battle of Algiers.
- Augustin Ferrando^{[fr]} (1880–1957), Orientalist painter, director of the School of Fine Arts in Oran.
- Marcello Fabri^{[fr]} (1889–1945), poet and Orientalist painter, essayist, philosopher, art critic, playwright, founder of two journals.
- Mohammed Benchicou (1952-), eminent journalist
- Alphonse Daudet (1840-1897), writer, visited here. In his Letters from My Windmill, there is a short story entitled "À Milianah."
- Lantri Elfoul (1936-2012), professor of translation, author of Miliana la mémoire, 2009 (Casbah éditions) and Traité de traductologie, 2006 (Casbah éditions), born and raised in Zougala, Miliana.
- Walter Amsallem^{[fr]} (1931-), former mayor of Beauvais (1977-2001), born in Miliana
- Pierre Bolotte^{[fr]} (1921-2008), sub-prefect of Miliana
- Jean Kay^{[fr]} (1943-2012), adventurer and writer
- Mahfoud Ferroukhi^{[fr]} (1953-), Algerian archeologist.
- Mustapha Tounsi^{[fr]} (1939-2018), officer in the ALN (National Liberation Army) and writer
- Noureddine Ferroukhi^{[fr]} (1959-2019), plastic artist and teacher.
