= Aït Chafâa =

- Commune and town
- Interactive map of Aït Chafâa
- Coordinates: 36°49′08″N 4°31′56″E
- Country: Algeria
- Province: Tizi Ouzou Province
- Time zone: UTC+1 (CET)

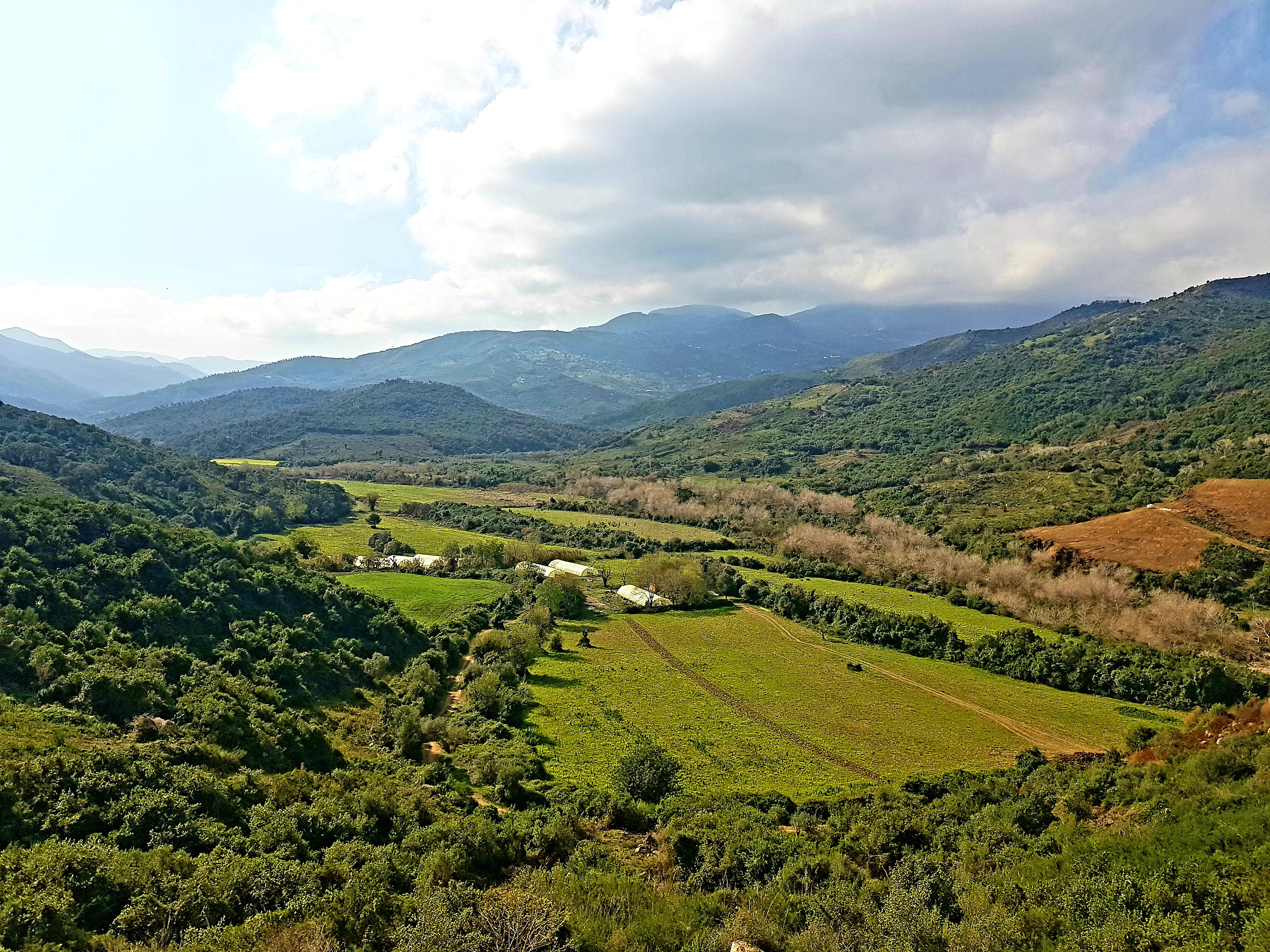
Mountains and river of Ait Chafaa Sidi Khelifa

Aït Chafâa is a town and commune in Tizi Ouzou Province in northern Algeria.
