= Fodil Mezali =

Algerian journalist, editor-in-chief and managing editor

- فضيل مزالي
- Born: 23 April 1959 (age 67); Thénia, Algeria
- Education: Journalism
- Alma mater: University of Algiers
- Occupations: Journalist; Editor-in-chief; Managing editor
- Writing career
- Language: Arabic, Berber, French
- Years active: 1989–2021
- Notable works: Alger républicain; Le Matin; La Cité; Tighremt

Fodil Mezali (Arabic: فضيل مزالي) (born in Thénia on 23 April 1959) is an Algerian journalist, editor-in-chief and managing editor.

== Early life ==
Mezali was born in 1959 in the town of Thénia in the lower Kabylia region of Algeria, east of the Khachna Massif and south-east of the town of Boumerdès.

After primary and intermediate studies in Thénia, Mezali continued his secondary education at a high school in Algiers, where he obtained his baccalaureate in 1979, and then pursued studies in journalism at the University of Algiers.

== Alger républicain ==
Mezali began his professional career as a journalist in the Alger républicain newspaper in July 1989.

Among his colleagues were Saïd Mekbel and Mohamed Benchicou. The newspaper ceased publication in December 1994.

== Le Matin ==
Mezali founded the newspaper Le Matin in 1991 as the editor-in-chief with Saïd Mekbal and Mohamed Benchicou, while remaining a contributor of columns to the Algiers Republican.

Mezali left this daily when he was suspended on 26 July 2004 for non-payment of debts, and after its director, Mohamed Benchicou was imprisoned on 14 June 2004 for having written a pamphlet book on President Abdelaziz Bouteflika which he titled "Bouteflika, an Algerian Sham" (French: Bouteflika, une imposture algérienne).

== Le Quotidien d'Algérie ==
After the bankruptcy and closure of the newspaper Le Matin, Mezali contributed articles to several Algerian press titles from 2005 until 2012, such as Le Quotidien d'Algérie.

== La Cité ==
Mezali waited seven years after the newspaper Le Matin's dissolution before returning to the Algerian journalistic scene by publishing, as a managing editor, a daily newspaper entitled La Cité, which published its first issue on 21 April 2013. It chose as its maxim on the editorial line, "The newspaper of a camp and not of a clan" (French: Le journal d'un camp et non-d'un clan).

== Tighremt ==
Mezali launched another publication with an experimental edition of the Kabyle-language newspaper Tighremt on 22 February 2020.

Having directed the French-language daily La Cité since 2012, he wanted to launch his Berber-speaking corollary Tighremt, whose first number was published on 29 February 2020.

Mezali handpicked for proven language skills in Tighremt's editorial team, made up primarily of Tamazight teachers. He commissioned a pair of seasoned specialists in the field, Djamel Ikhloufi and Yacine Zidane, to lead this press title. This Berber-speaking title comes from a bi-weekly and then weekly notebook inserted in the daily La Cité since 2015 for 550 issues.

== See also ==
- List of Algerians
- List of Algerian writers
- List of newspapers in Algeria
- Alger républicain

== Bibliography ==
- Jeune Afrique l'intelligent, Numéros 1942 à 1954. Paris: Groupe Jeune Afrique. 1998. p. 92.
- Jeune Afrique. Paris: Société africaine de presse. 1998. p. 92.
- M'Hamed Rebah (2002). La presse algérienne: journal d'un défi. Algiers: Éditions Chihab. p. 175;228. ISBN 978-9961634622.
