= Mohammed Benchicou =

Algerian journalist (1952–2026)

- محمد بنشيكو
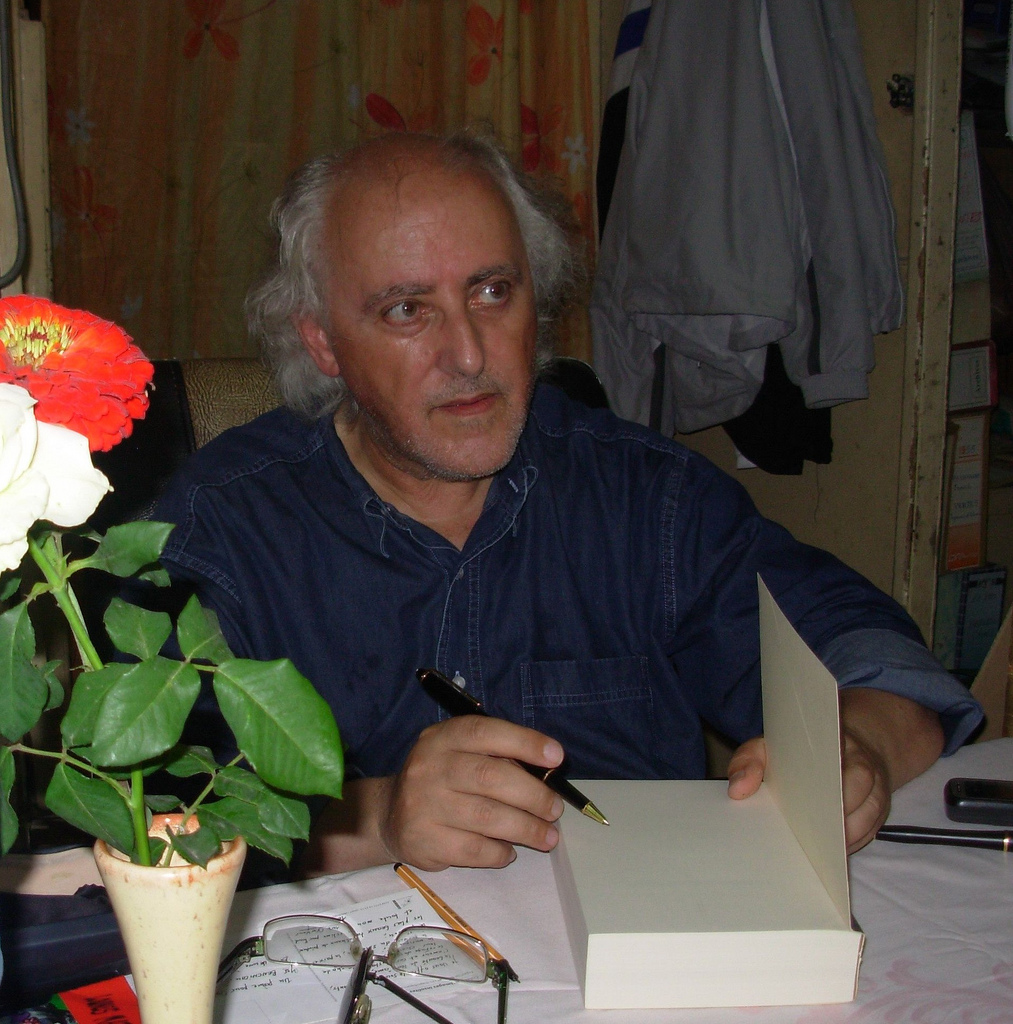
- Mohamed Benchicou signing autographs in 2011
- Born: 1 July 1952; Miliana, Aïn Defla Province, French Algeria
- Died: 24 September 2026 (aged 74); France
- Occupations: Journalist, activist
- Known for: Le Matin newspaper, Bouteflika.. an Algerian Fraud

Mohammed Boualem Benchicou (Arabic: محمد بوعلام بنشيكو; 1 July 1952 – 24 September 2026) was an Algerian journalist who was the director and publisher of Algerian newspaper Le Matin (English: the sunrise), closed in August 2006.

== Career ==
In 1989, he was one of the founders of the movement of Algerian journalists (MJA) a movement born during the opening of the media field. He then led the team which relaunched Alger Républicain, banned from publication in 1965. Benchicou left Alger Républicain in 1991 with Saïd Mekbel and Fodil Mezali and founded the daily newspaper Le Matin of opposition.

In June 2004, he was sentenced to two years in prison for an infraction in money exchange regulation. In July, SIMPRAL, the Algiers-based government publisher, stopped printing Le Matin for its failure to pay a debt of 38 million dinars ($535,200).

PEN (the international association of writers) describes the prison in which Benchicou was in as harsh and infested with lice and cockroaches; with 50 prisoners to a cell. Benchicou's health has reportedly deteriorated since his imprisonment which caused him to develop arthritis; consequently, he lost the ability to use his right hand for writing.

Benchicou also published a book in 2004 called Bouteflika, an Algerian “fraud”, believed to be the source of all his juridic problems.

== Personal life and death ==
Mohamed Benchicou was the eldest of a family of seven children. He was married and father of three children, two girls and a boy. Benchicou died in France on 24 September 2026, at the age of 74.

== Awards and honors ==
- 2006 PEN/Barbara Goldsmith Freedom to Write Award

== Bibliography ==
- Bouteflika, une imposture algérienne (Bouteflika an Algerian "Fake"), Le Matin Editions - Picollec, 2004
- Les geôles d’Alger (Prisons of Algiers), Inas - Riveneuve, 2007
- Je pardonnerai, (I'll Forgive, Poems), Inas, 2008
- Journal d'un homme libre, (A Freeman's Diaries) Auteur-Riveneuve, 2008
- Notre ami Bouteflika, de l'état rêvé à l'état scélérat (Our Friend Bouteflika), Riveneuve, 2010
- Le mensonge de Dieu (God's Lie), Michalon, 2011
- Le dernier soir du dictateur (Last Night of a Dictator), Riveneuve, 2011
